= List of Solanum species =

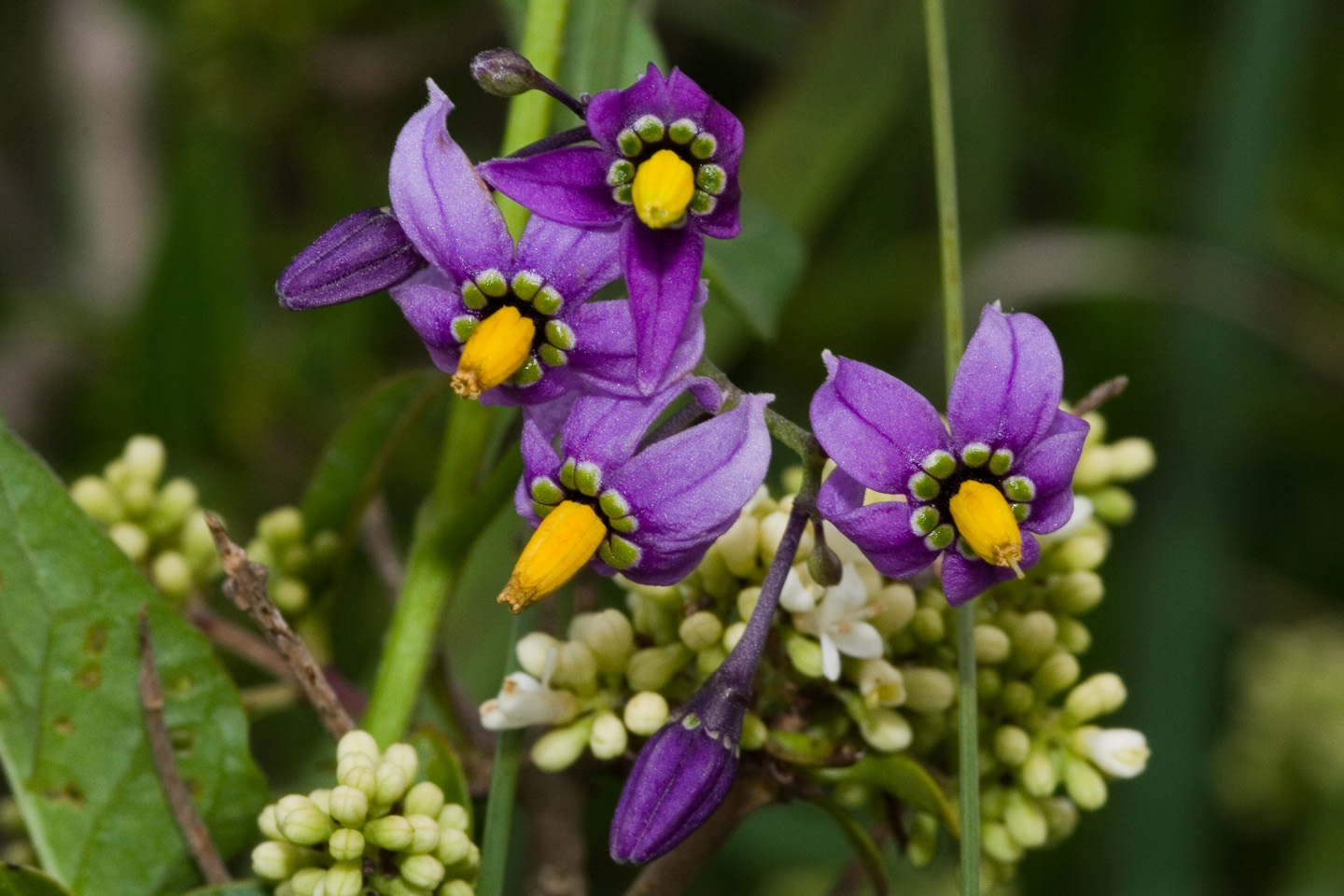
Detail of the flowers of Solanum dulcamara, one of the 1240 accepted taxa that make up the genus Solanum (Solanaceae), along with economically important species such as the potato (S. tuberosum), the tomato (S. lycopersicum) and the aubergine (S. melongena).

This is a list of species in the plant genus Solanum. There may be as many as 1,500 species worldwide. With some 1240 accepted specific and infra-specific taxa of the more than 4,000 described, the genus Solanum contains more species than any other genus in the family Solanaceae and it is one of the largest among the angiosperms.

Phylogenetic analysis of molecular data has established or confirmed that the genera Lycopersicon, Cyphomandra, Normania, and Triguera, which were previously classified independently, should in reality be included within the Solanum. In fact, all the species from these four genera have been formally transferred to Solanum. On the other hand, the genus Lycianthes, which is sometimes included within the Solanum, has been shown to be a separate genus.

The following alphabetical list of Solanum species provides the binomial name followed by the name of the species authority, abbreviated according to the appropriate conventions and uses.

The tuberous species within the genus (those related to Solanum tuberosum, the potato, and therefore often called wild potatoes) have been indicated with the letter T. The nothospecies belonging to the genus appear at the end of the list, that is those taxa that have originated from a hybrid between two different species (for example, Solanum × viirsooi, which has been shown to be an interspecific hybrid resulting from the cross between S. acaule and S. infundibuliforme.)

== A ==
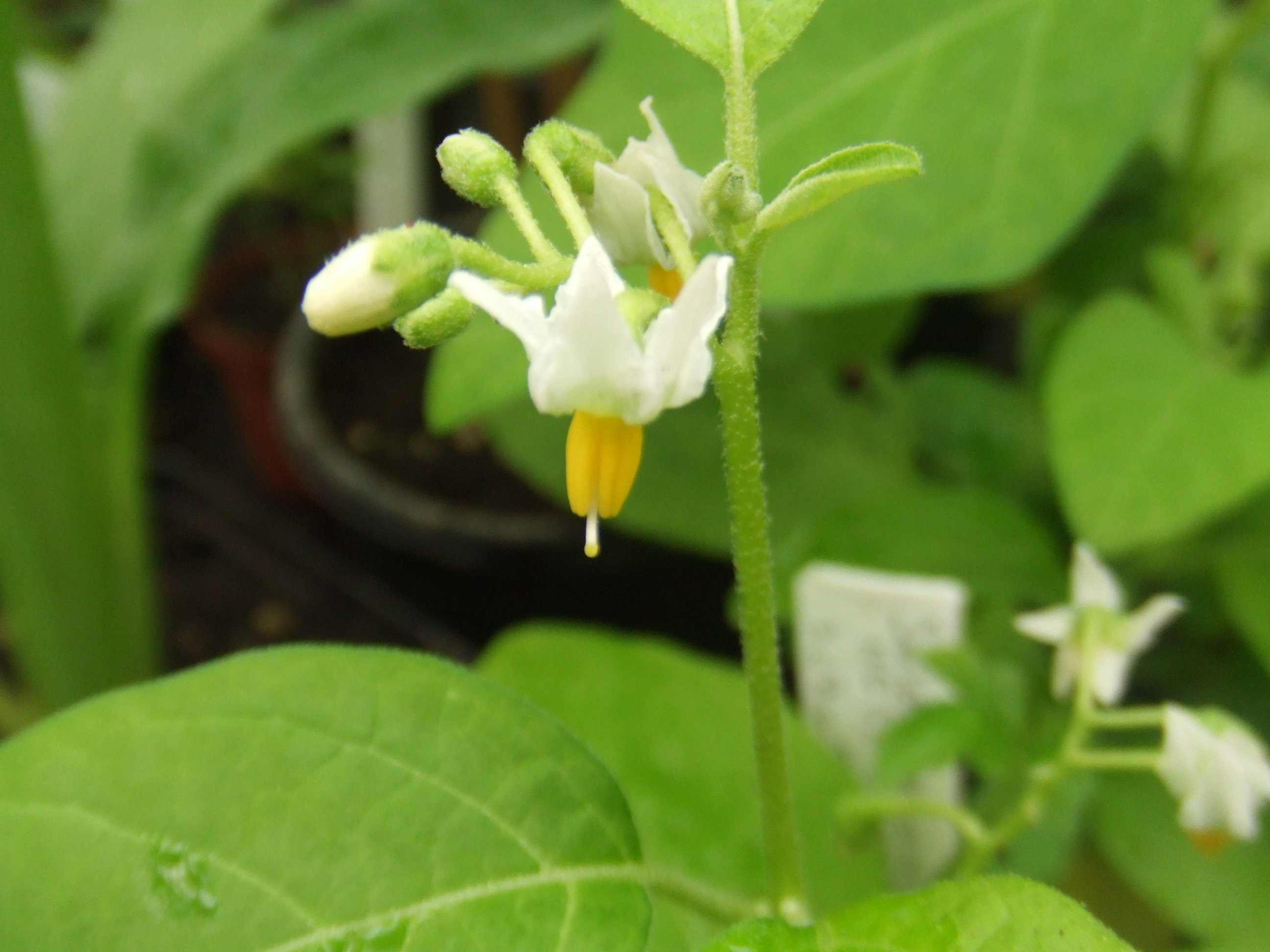
Flower of Solanum aethiopicum

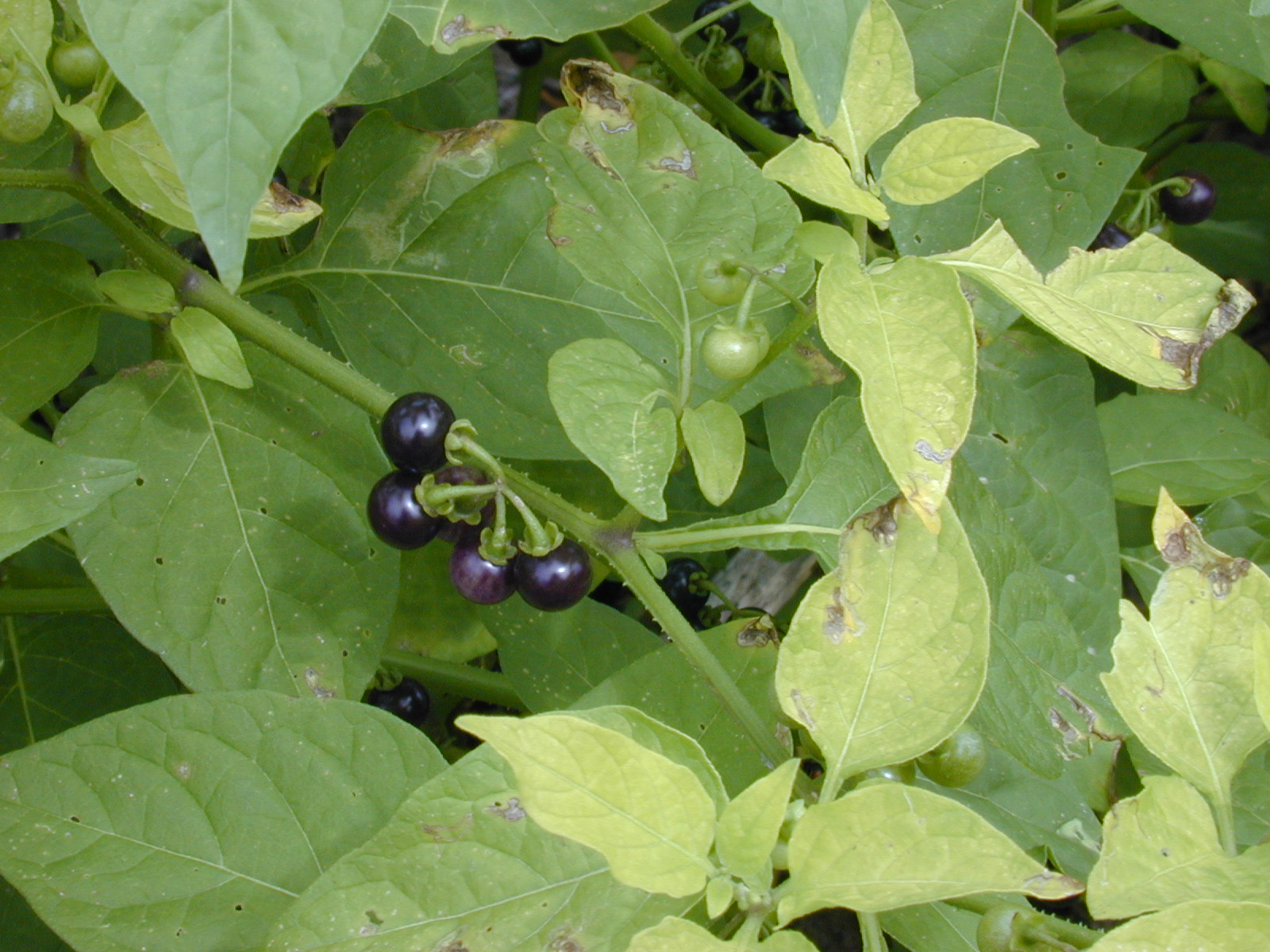
Fruit of Solanum americanum

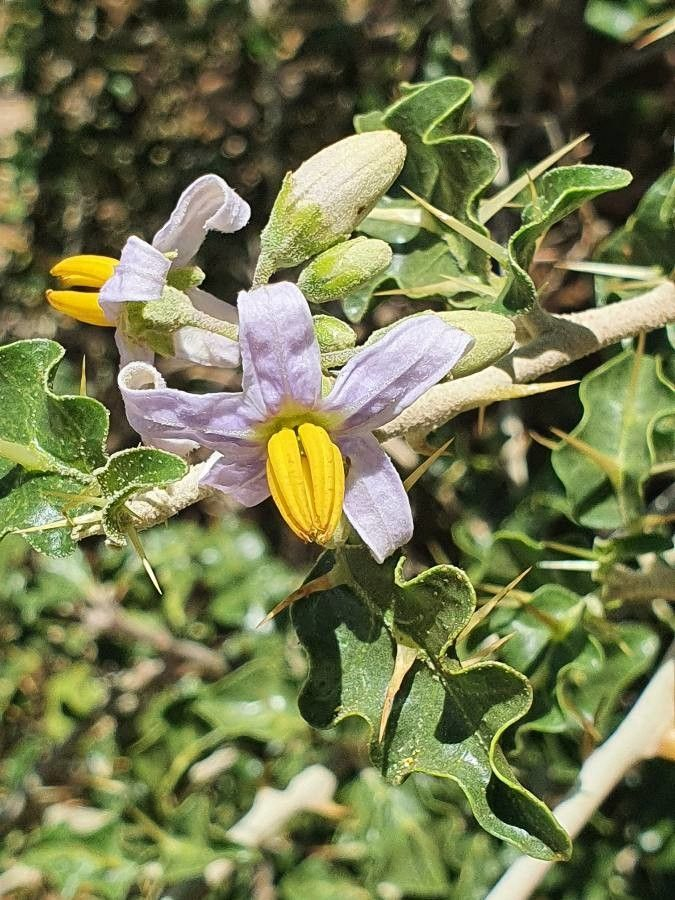
Flowers of Solanum arundo

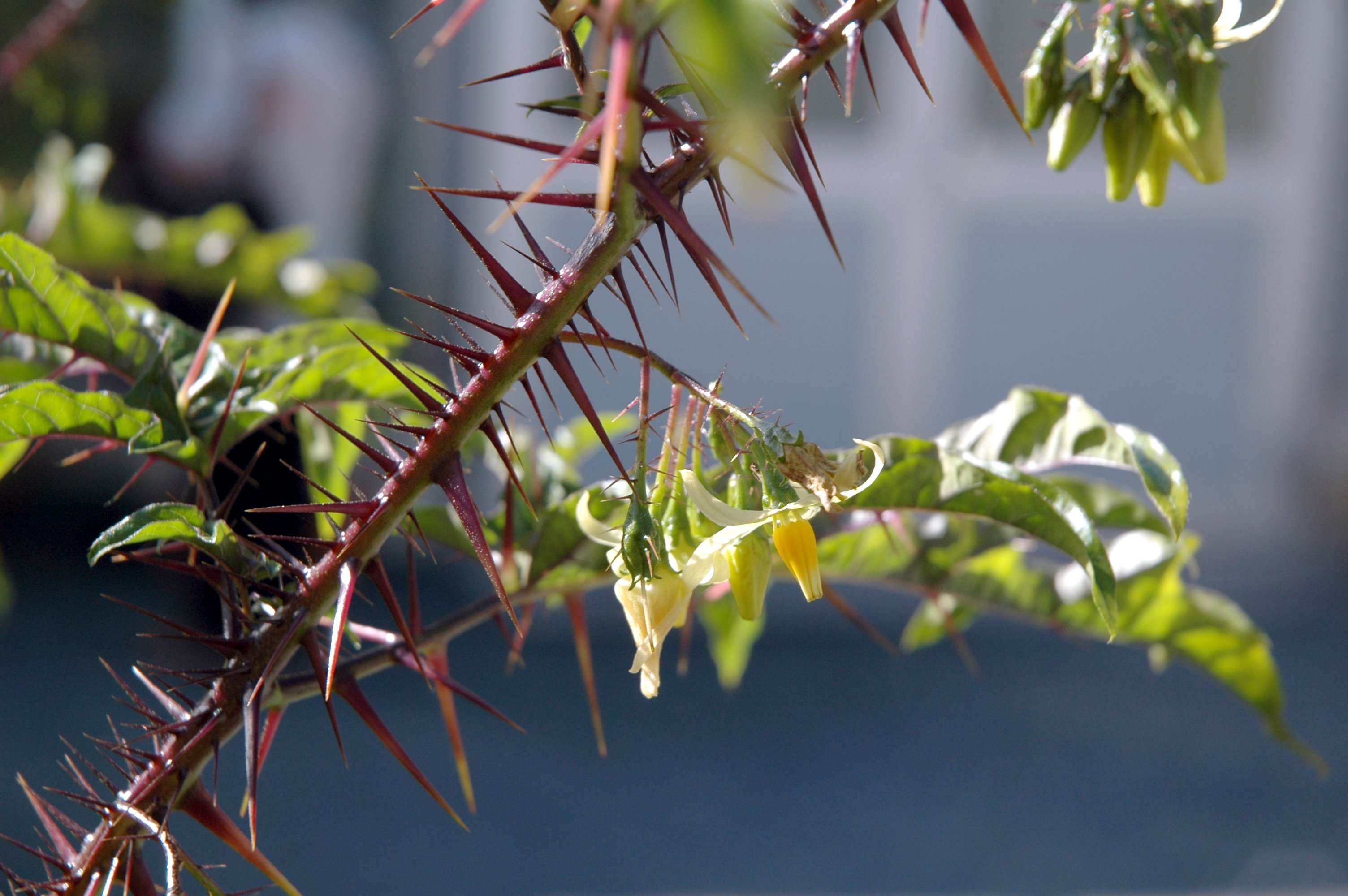
Spiny stem and inflorescence of Solanum atropurpureum

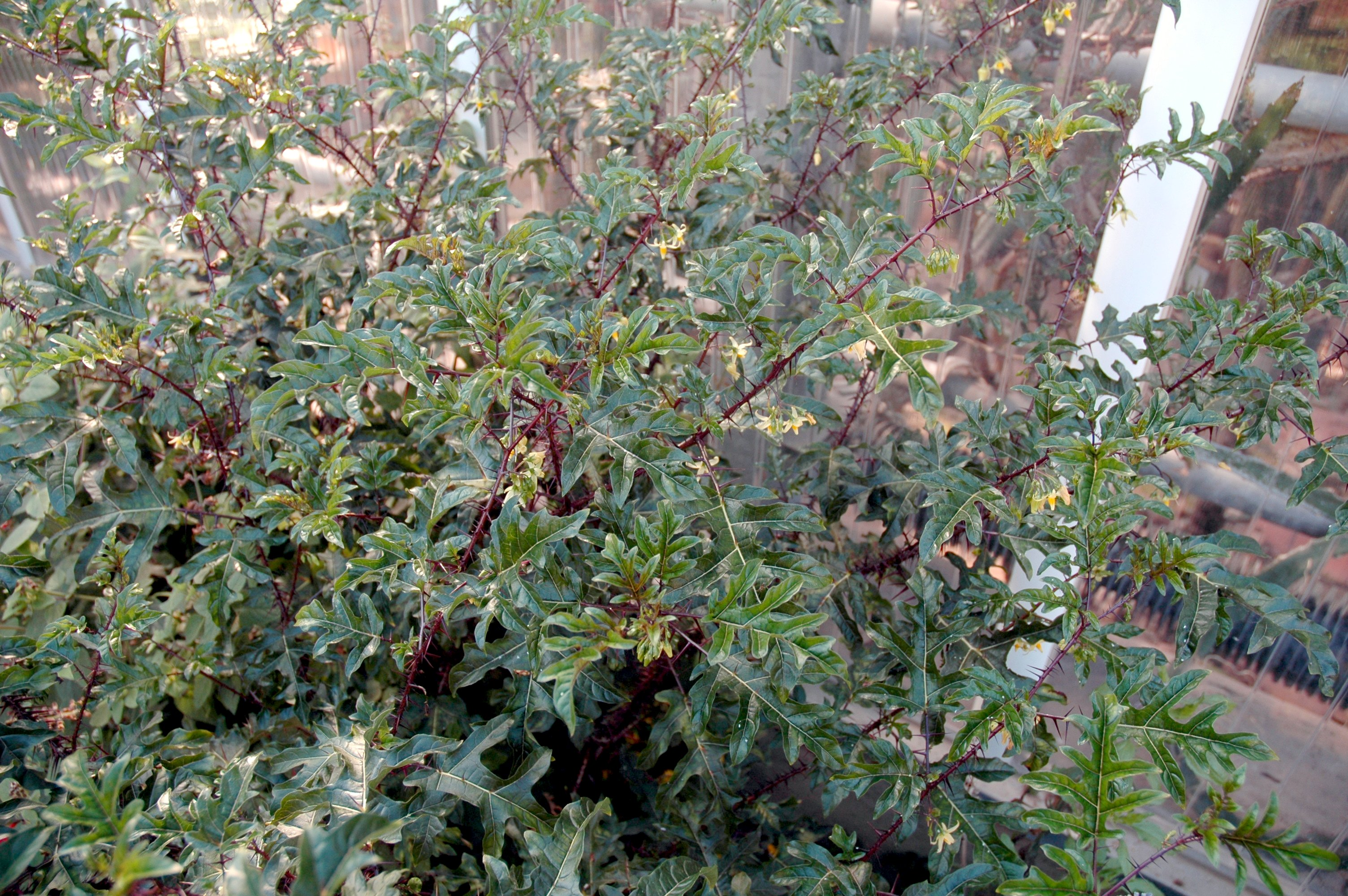
Growth habit of Solanum atropurpureum

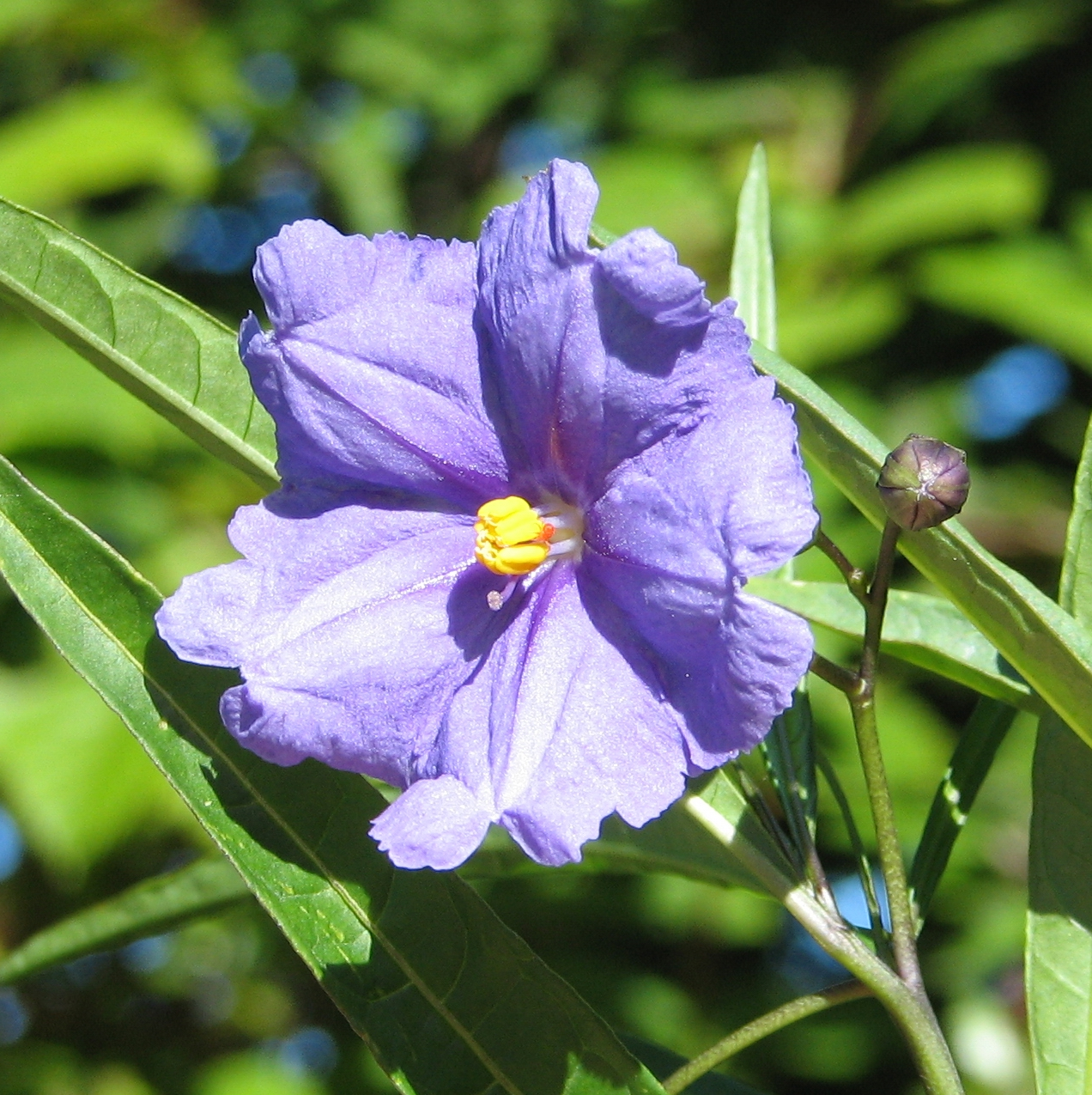
Flower of Solanum aviculare

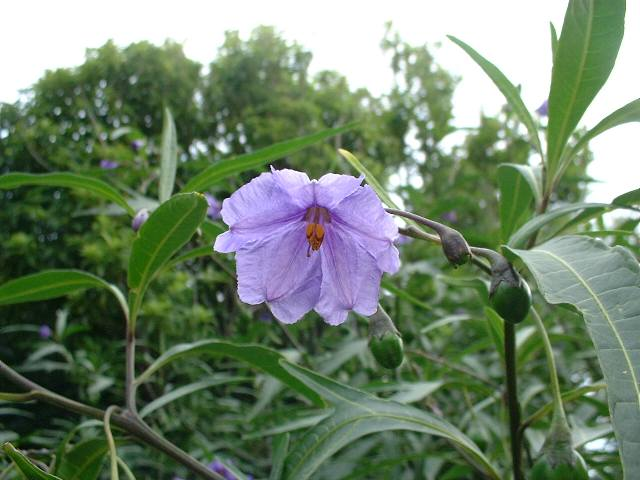
Solanum aviculare

- Solanum abitaguense S.Knapp
- Solanum abortivum Symon
- Solanum absconditum Agra
- Solanum abutilifolium Rusby
- Solanum abutiloides (Griseb.) Bitter & Lillo
- Solanum acanthodapis A.R.Bean
- T Solanum acaule Bitter
- Solanum accrescens Standl. & C.V.Morton
- Solanum acerifolium Dunal
- Solanum achorum S.R. Stern, 2010
- T Solanum acroglossum Juz.
- Solanum acropterum Griseb.
- T Solanum acroscopicum Ochoa
- Solanum actaeabotrys Rusby
- Solanum actephilum Guillaumin
- Solanum aculeastrum Dunal
- Solanum aculeatissimum Jacq.
- Solanum acuminatum Ruiz & Pav.
- Solanum acutilobum Dunal
- Solanum adamantium Gouvêa
- Solanum adenobasis M.Nee & Farruggia
- Solanum adenophorum F.Muell.
- Solanum adoense Hochst. ex A.Rich.
- Solanum adoxum A.R.Bean
- Solanum adscendens Sendtn. – Sonoita nightshade
- Solanum adspersum Witasek
- Solanum aemulans Bitter & Wittm.
- Solanum aethiopicum L.
- Solanum affine Sendtn.
- Solanum africanum Mill.
- Solanum agnewiorum Voronts.
- Solanum agnoston S.Knapp
- Solanum agrarium Sendtn.
- T Solanum agrimoniifolium Rydb.
- T Solanum ajanhuiri Juz. & Bukasov
- Solanum alatirameum Bitter
- Solanum albescens (Britton) Hunz.
- T Solanum albicans (Ochoa) Ochoa.
- Solanum albidum Dunal
- T Solanum albornozii Correll.
- Solanum albostellatum R.W.Davis & P.J.H.Hurter
- Solanum aldabrense C.H.Wright
- Solanum aligerum Schltdl.
- Solanum alliariifolium M. Nee & Särkinen, 2015
- Solanum allophyllum (Miers) Standl.
- Solanum aloysiifolium Dunal
- Solanum alphonsei Dunal .
- Solanum alpinum Zoll. & Moritzi
- Solanum alternatopinnatum Steud.
- T Solanum amayanum Ochoa.
- Solanum amblophyllum Hook.
- Solanum amblymerum Dunal.
- Solanum americanum Mill. – American nightshade, American black nightshade, glossy nightshade
- Solanum amicorum Benth.
- Solanum ammophilum A.R.Bean.
- Solanum amnicola S.Knapp
- Solanum amorimii S. Knapp & Giacomin, 2015
- Solanum amotapense Svenson
- Solanum amygdalifolium Steud.
- T Solanum anamatophilum Ochoa.
- Solanum anceps Ruiz & Pav.
- T Solanum ancophilum (Correll) Ochoa.
- T Solanum andreanum Baker.
- Solanum anfractum Symon
- Solanum anguivi Lam.
- Solanum angustialatum Bitter
- Solanum angustifidum Bitter
- Solanum angustifolium Mill.
- Solanum angustum Domin
- Solanum anisocladum Giacomin & Stehmann
- Solanum anisophyllum Van Heurck & Müll.Arg.
- Solanum annuum C.V.Morton
- Solanum anoacanthum Sendtn.
- Solanum anomalostemon S.Knapp & M.Nee
- Solanum anomalum Thonn.
- Solanum antisuyo Särkinen & S. Knapp, 2015
- Solanum apaporanum R.E.Schult.
- Solanum aparadense Mentz & M.Nee
- Solanum aphyodendron S.Knapp
- Solanum apiahyense Witasek
- Solanum apiculatum Sendtn.
- Solanum apodophyllum A.R.Bean
- Solanum appendiculatum Dunal
- Solanum appressum K.E. Roe
- Solanum arachnidanthum Rusby
- Solanum arachnoides A.R.Bean
- Solanum arboreum Dunal
- Solanum arcanum Peralta – "wild tomato"
- Solanum arenarium Sendtn.
- Solanum arenicola Särkinen & P. Gonzáles, 2015
- Solanum arequipense Bitter
- Solanum argenteum Dunal .
- Solanum argentinum Bitter & Lillo
- Solanum argopetalum A.R.Bean
- Solanum aridicola A.R.Bean
- Solanum aridum Morong
- Solanum armentalis J.L.Gentry & D'Arcy Ann.
- Solanum armourense A.R.Bean
- Solanum artense Montr
- Solanum arundo Mattei Boll.
- Solanum ashbyae Symon
- Solanum asperolanatum Ruiz & Pav.
- Solanum asperrimum Bitter
- Solanum aspersum S.Knapp
- Solanum asperum Rich. Actes
- Solanum asterophorum Mart.
- Solanum asteropilodes Bitter
- Solanum asymmetriphyllum Specht
- Solanum athenae Symon
- Solanum atitlanum K.E. Roe
- Solanum atropurpureum Schrank
- Solanum aturense Dunal
- Solanum augustii Ochoa
- Solanum aureitomentosum Bitter
- Solanum aureum Dunal
- Solanum austrocaledonicum Seem.
- Solanum austropiceum A.R.Bean
- Solanum aviculare G.Forst. – poroporo (New Zealand), kangaroo apple (Australia)
- Solanum axillifolium K.E. Roe
- T Solanum ayacuchense Ochoa.

== B ==
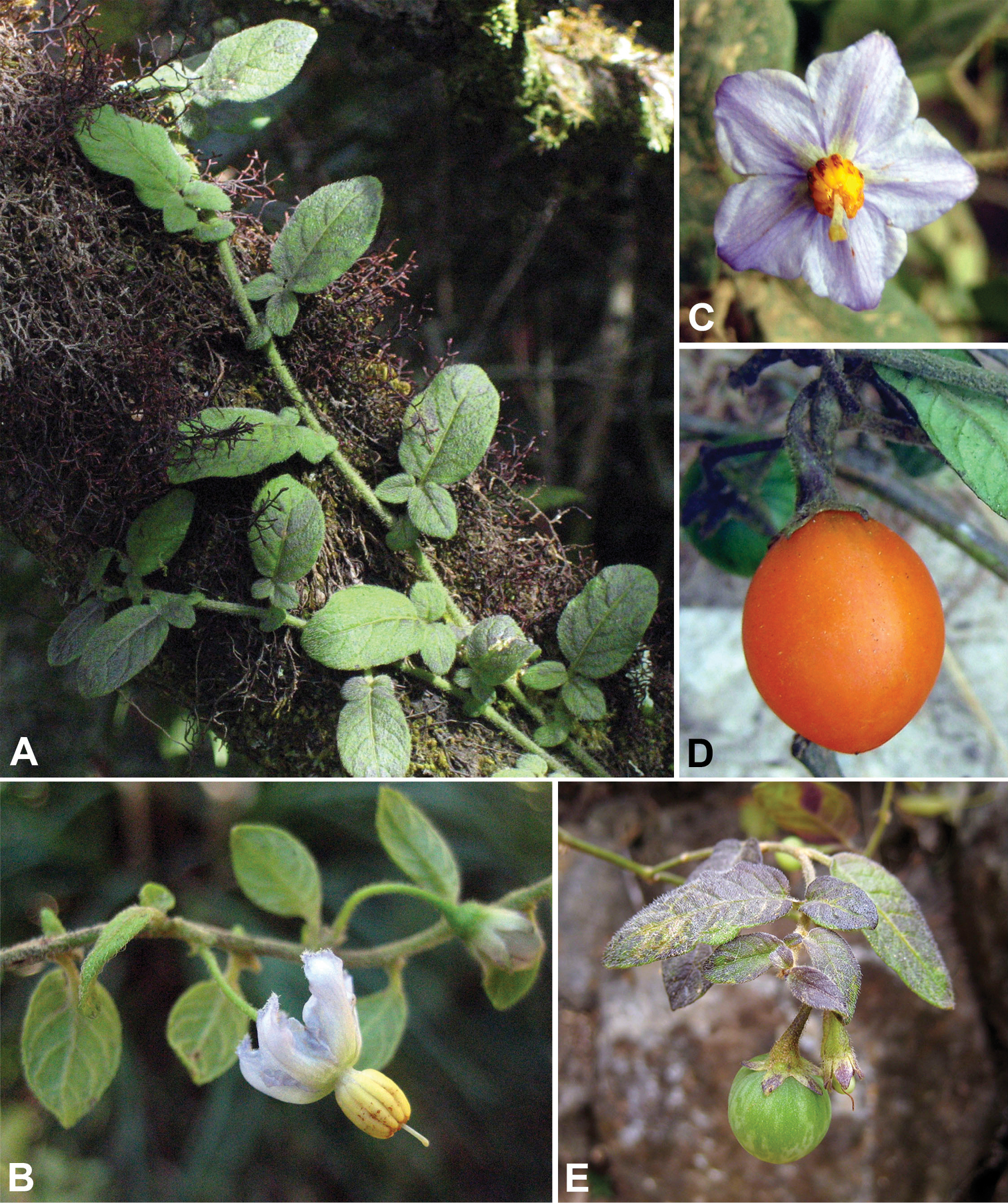
Flower, fruit and leaf of Solanum baretiae

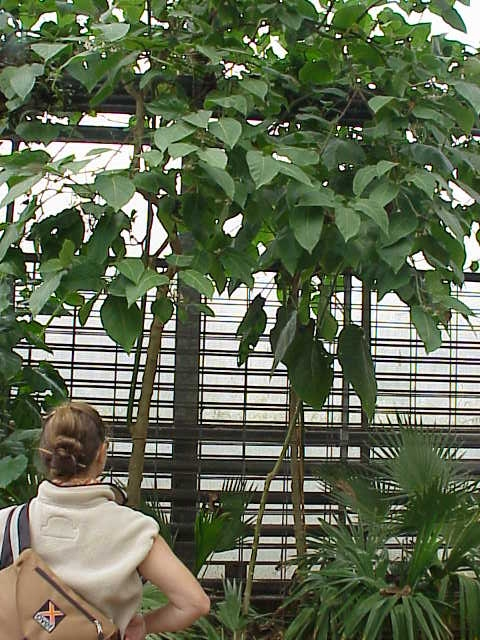
Growth habit of Solanum betaceum

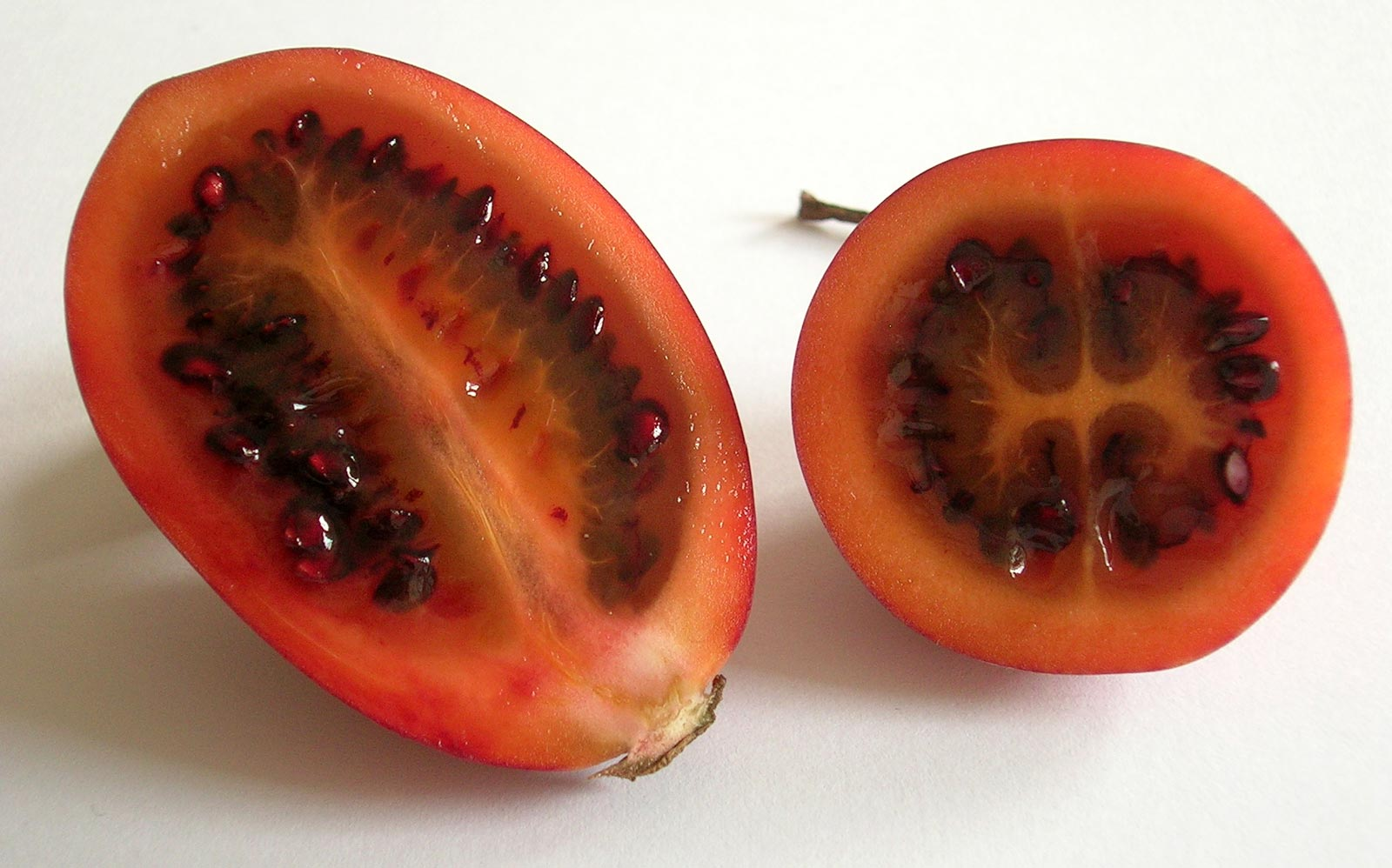
Fruit of Solanum betaceum in longitudinal and axial cross section.

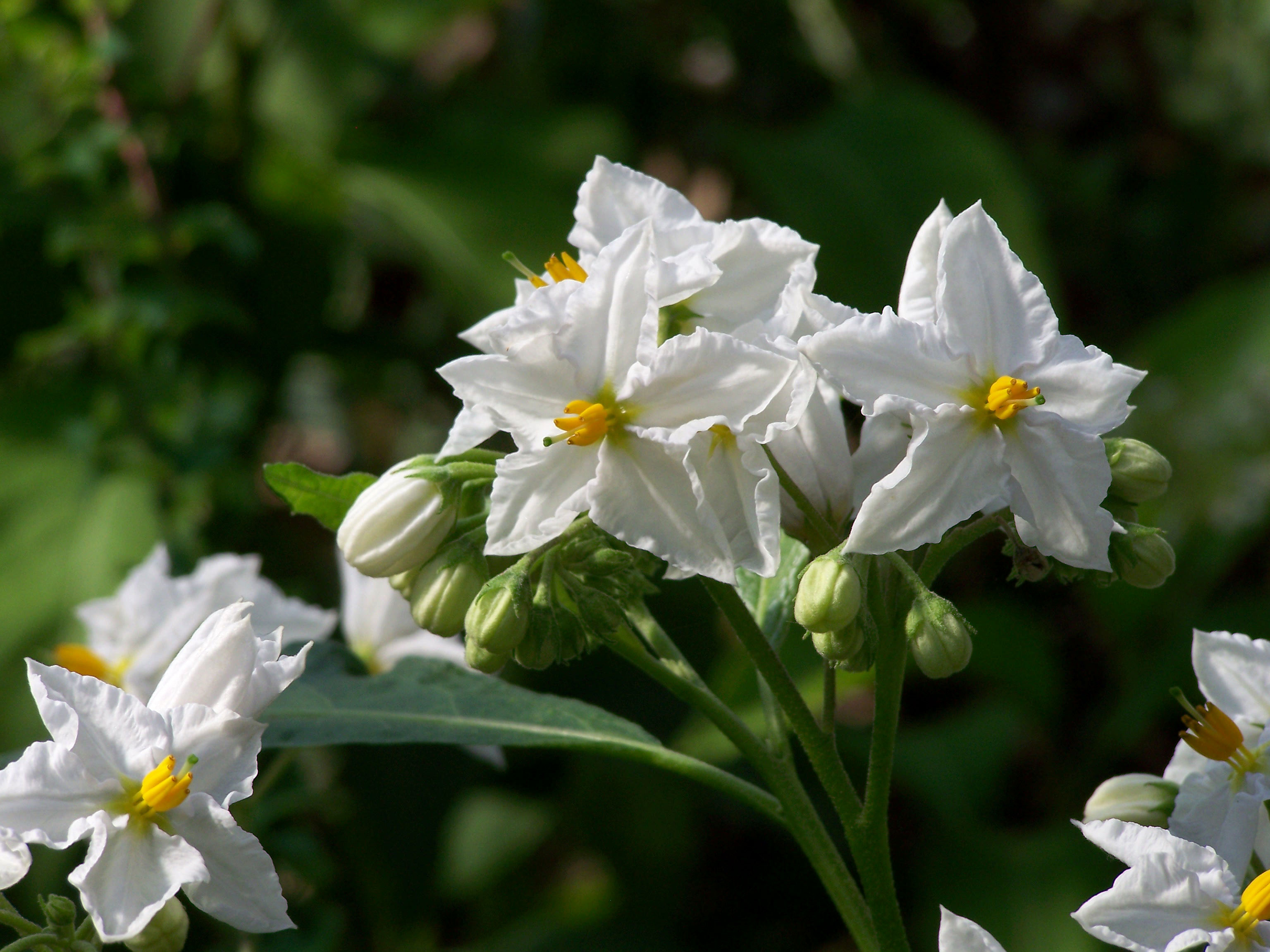
Inflorescence of Solanum bonariensis

- Solanum bahamense L.
- Solanum bahianum S.Knapp
- Solanum banzicum A.R.Bean
- Solanum barbeyanum Huber
- Solanum barbisetum Nees
- Solanum barbulatum Zahlbr.
- Solanum baretiae Tepe
- Solanum basendopogon Bitter
- Solanum batoides D'Arcy & Rakot.
- Solanum bauerianum Endl.
- Solanum beaugleholei Symon
- Solanum bellum S.Knapp
- T Solanum berthaultii Hawkes.
- Solanum betaceum Cav. – tree tomato, tamarillo
- Solanum betroka D'Arcy & Rakot.
- Solanum bicolor Willd. ex Roem. & Schult.
- Solanum bicorne Dunal
- Solanum bistellatum L.B.Sm. & Downs
- Solanum bohsiae J.D.Tovar
- Solanum boldoense Dunal & A.DC.
- Solanum bolivianum Britt. ex Rusby
- T Solanum boliviense Dunal. A. L. P. P. de Candolle
- Solanum bombycinum Ochoa
- Solanum bonariense L.
- Solanum borgmannii Symon
- Solanum brachyantherum Phil.
- Solanum bradei Giacomin & Stehmann, 2014
- T Solanum brevicaule Bitter.
- Solanum brevifolium Dunal
- Solanum brevipedicellatum K.E. Roe
- Solanum brownii Dunal
- Solanum buddleiaefolium Sendtn.
- Solanum buesii Vargas
- T Solanum bulbocastanum Dunal – ornamental nightshade
- Solanum bullatum Vell.
- Solanum bumeliaefolium Dunal
- Solanum burchellii Dunal
- T Solanum burkartii Ochoa

== C ==
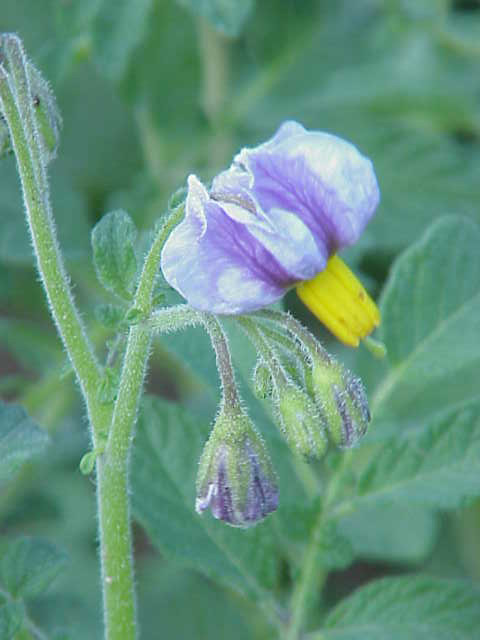
Flower of Solanum candolleanum

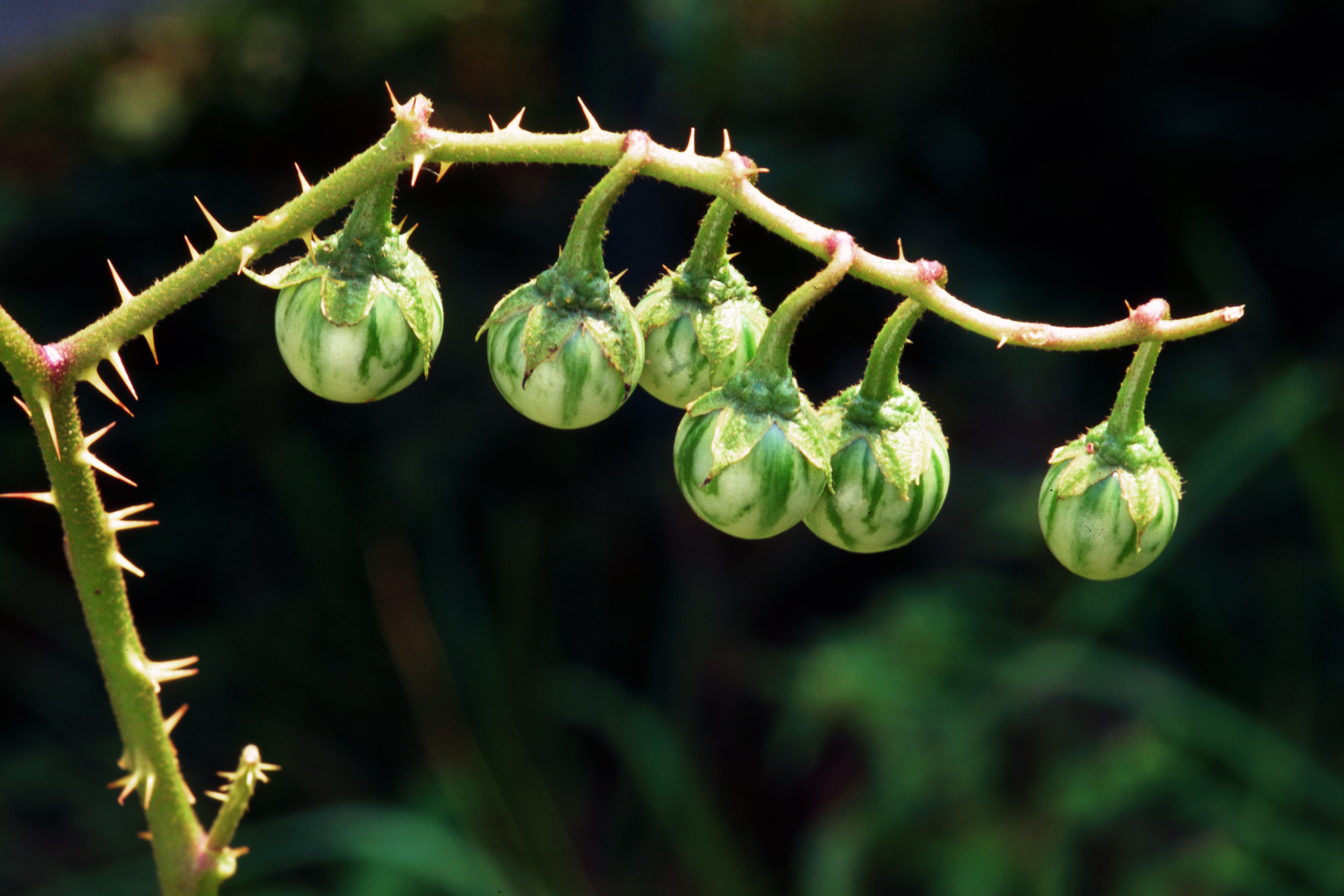
Fruit and spiny stem of Solanum carolinense

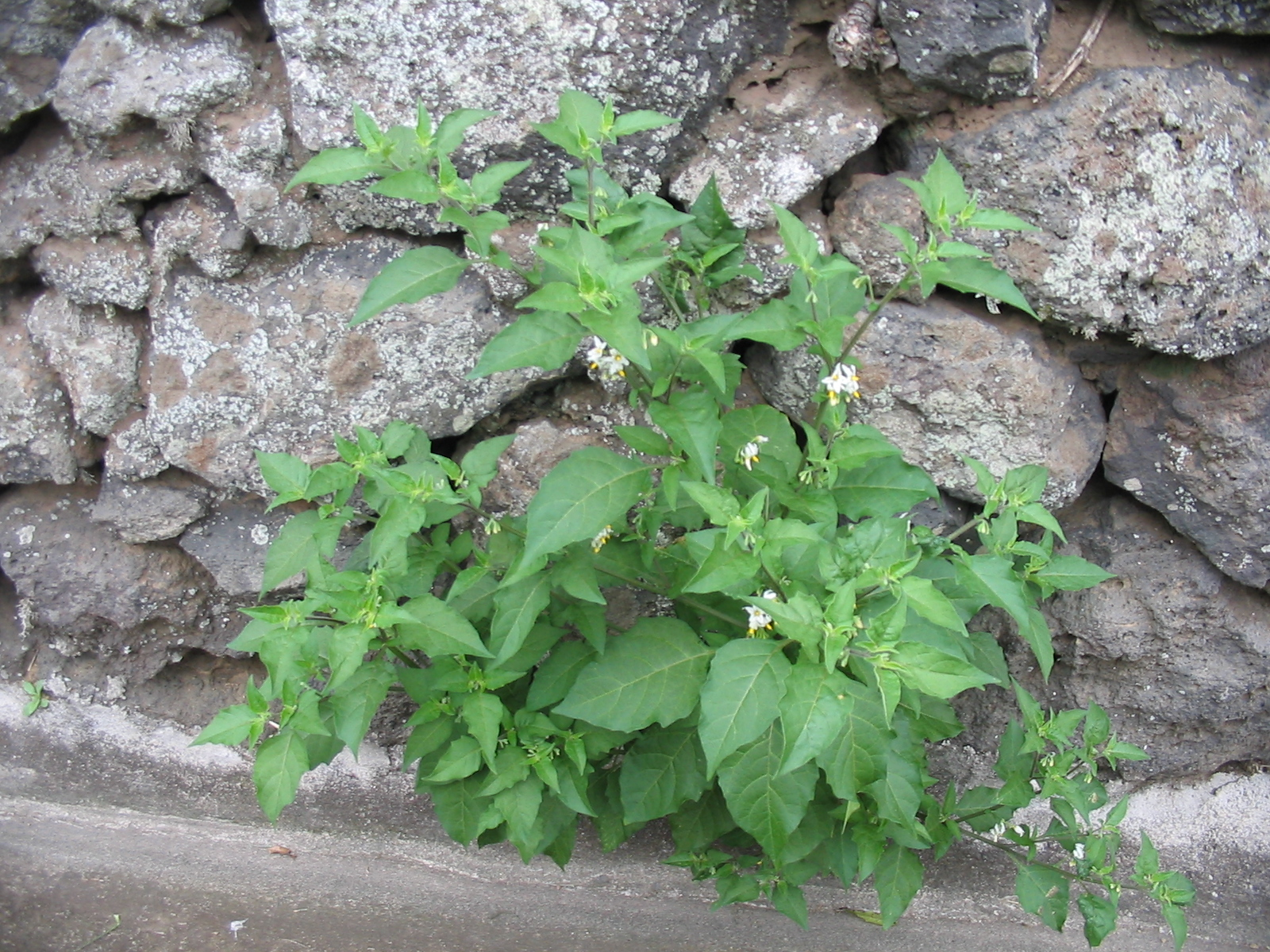
Solanum chenopodioides growing between rocks

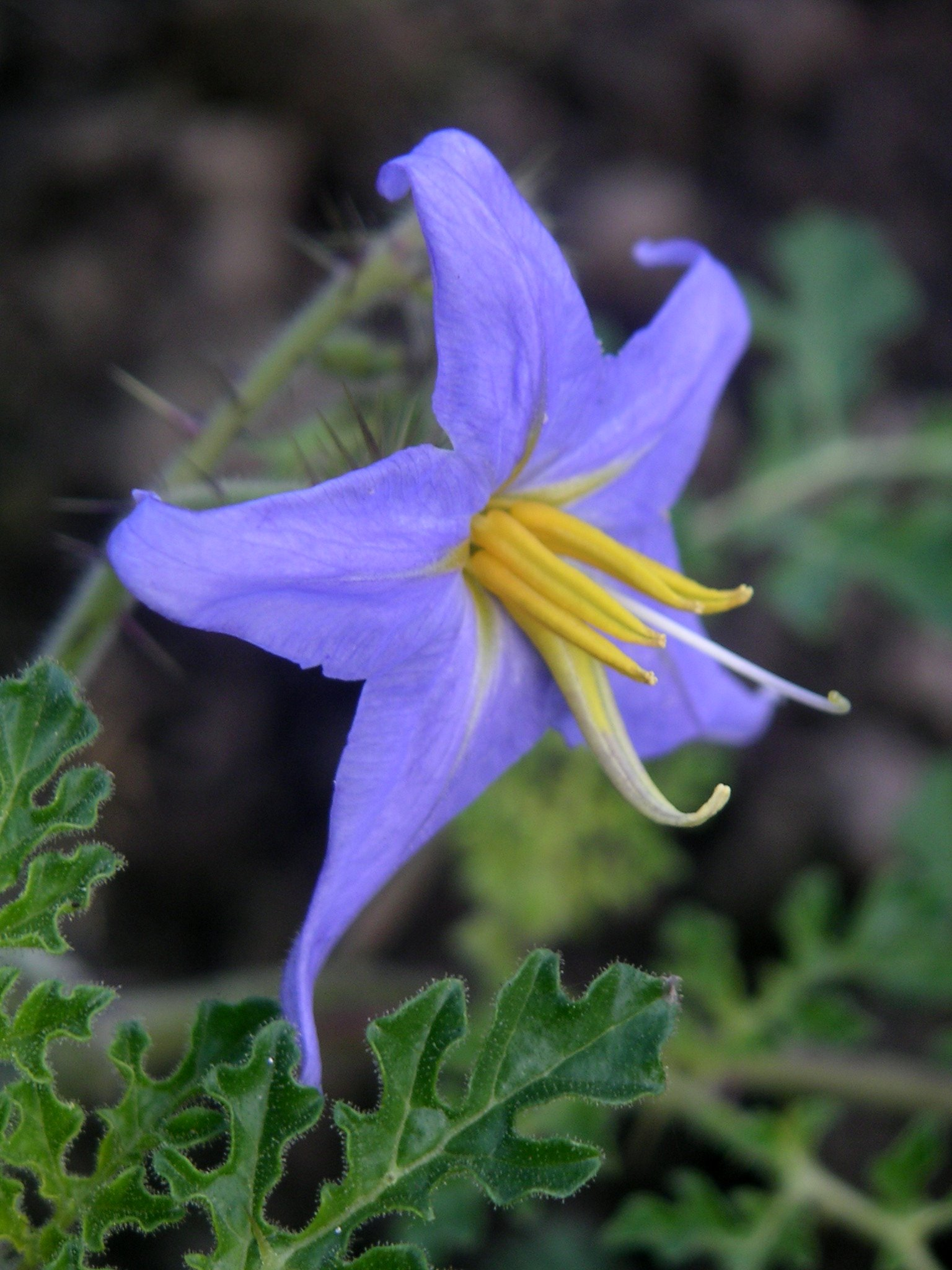
Detail of the flower of Solanum citrullifolium

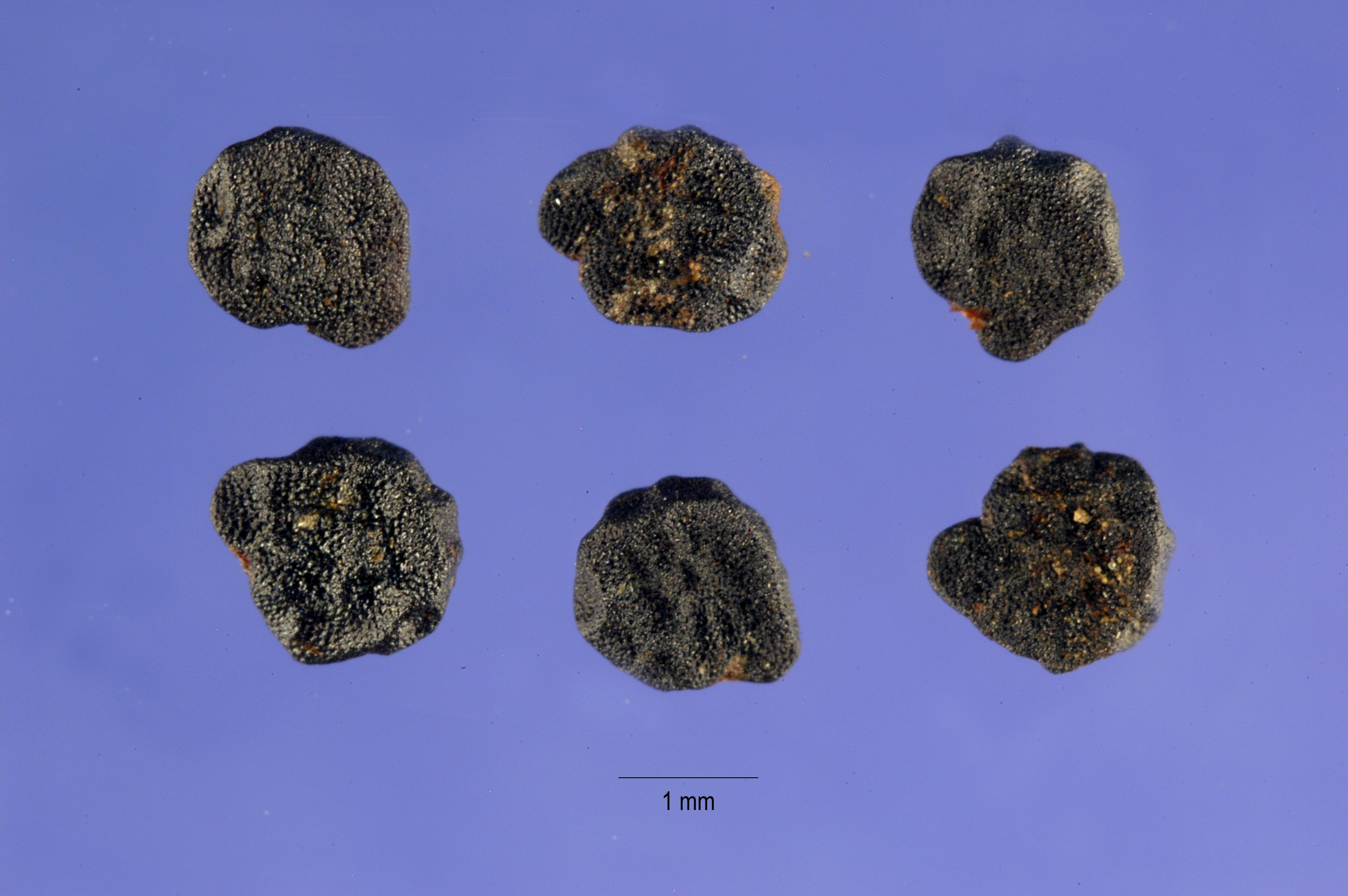
Detail of the seeds of Solanum citrullifolium

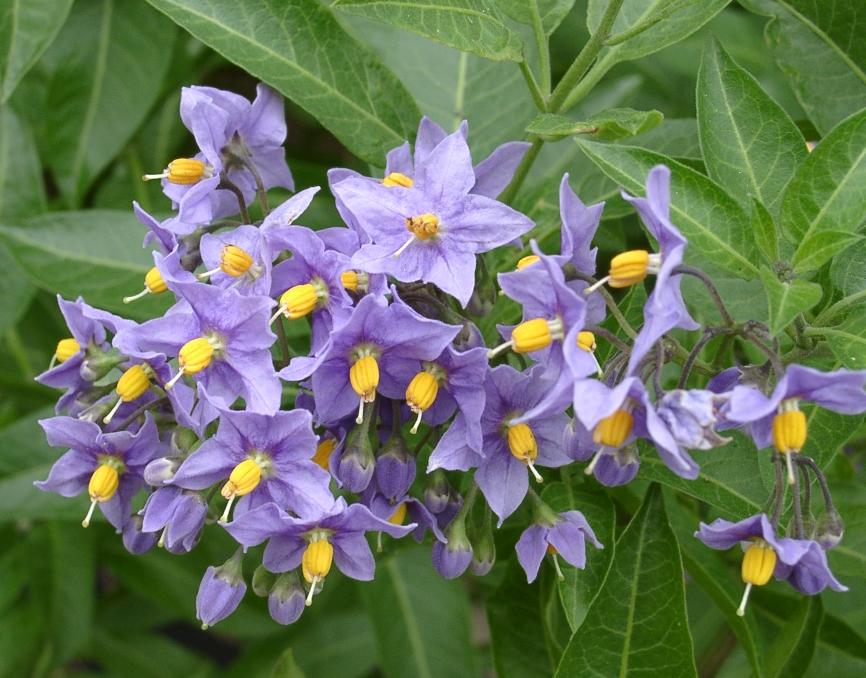
Solanum crispum

- Solanum caatingae S.Knapp & Särkinen
- Solanum caavurana Vell.
- Solanum cacosmum Bohs
- Solanum caelicola Giacomin & Stehmann, 2013
- T Solanum caesium Griseb.
- T Solanum cajamarquense Ochoa.
- Solanum cajanumense Kunth
- Solanum caldense Carvalho
- Solanum calidum Bohs
- Solanum calileguae Cabrera
- Solanum callianthum C.V.Morton
- Solanum callicarpoides Wall.
- Solanum callosum A.R.Bean
- Solanum campaniforme Roem. & Schult.
- Solanum campanulatum R.Br.
- Solanum campanuliflorum C.H.Wright
- Solanum campechiense L.
- Solanum camptostylum Bitter
- Solanum campylacanthum Hochst. ex A.Rich.
- Solanum camranhense Dy Phon & Hul
- Solanum candelarianum Cárdenas
- T Solanum candidum Lindl.
- T Solanum candolleanum Berthault
- Solanum canense Rydb.
- Solanum cantense Ochoa
- Solanum capense L.
- Solanum capillipes Britton
- Solanum capitaneum A.R.Bean
- Solanum capsiciforme (Domin) Baylis
- T Solanum capsicoides All.
- Solanum carautae Carvalho
- T Solanum cardiophyllum Lindl. – heart-leaved nightshade, heartleaf horsenettle
- Solanum carduiforme Mueller
- Solanum caricaefolium Rusby
- T Solanum caripense Dunal
- T Solanum carolinense L. – horsenettle, Carolina horsenettle
- Solanum cassioides L.B.Sm. & Downs
- Solanum castaneum Carvalho
- Solanum cataphractum A.Cunn. ex Benth.
- Solanum catilliflorum G.J.Anderson, Martine, Prohens & Nuez
- Solanum catombelense Peyr.
- Solanum caumii (F.Br.) D.H.R.McClell.
- Solanum celatum A.R.Bean
- Solanum celsum Standl. & C.V.Morton
- Solanum centrale J.M.Black – bush tomato (central Australia)
- Solanum cerasiferum Dunal
- T Solanum cernuum Vell.
- Solanum chachapoyasense Bitter
- T Solanum chacoense Bitter.
- Solanum chalmersii S.Knapp
- Solanum chamaeacanthum Griseb.
- Solanum chamaepolybotryon Bitter
- Solanum cheesmaniae (L.Riley) Fosberg
- Solanum chenopodinum Mueller
- Solanum chenopodioides Lam. – goosefoot nightshade, slender nightshade (including S. gracilius)
- Solanum chiapasense K.E.Roe
- Solanum chilense (Dunal) Reiche
- Solanum chillagoense (Domin) A.R.Bean
- Solanum chilliasense Ochoa
- Solanum chimborazense Bitter & Sodiro
- Solanum chingchunense S.S.Ying
- Solanum chippendalei Symon
- Solanum chiquidenum Ochoa
- Solanum chlamydogynum Bitter
- Solanum chmielewskii (C.M.Rick, Kesicki, Fobes & M.Holle) D.M.Spooner, G.J.Anderson & R.K.Jansen.
- Solanum chomatophilum Bitter
- Solanum chrysasteroides Werderm.
- Solanum chrysotrichum Schltdl.
- Solanum cinereum R.Br.
- Solanum cinnamomeum Sendtn.
- Solanum circaeifolium Bitter
- T Solanum circinatum Bohs.
- Solanum citrinum M.Nee
- T Solanum citrullifolium A.Braun
- Solanum cladotrichum Dunal
- Solanum clandestinum Bohs
- Solanum clarkiae Symon
- T Solanum clarum Correll
- Solanum clathratum Sendtn.
- Solanum cleistogamum Symon
- Solanum clivorum S.Knapp
- Solanum coactiliferum J.M.Black
- Solanum coagulans Forssk.
- Solanum coalitum S.Knapp
- Solanum cobanense J.L.Gentry
- Solanum cochabambense Bitter .
- Solanum cochoae G.J.Anderson & Bernardello
- Solanum cocosoides A.R.Bean
- T Solanum colombianum Dunal
- Solanum comarapanum M.Nee
- Solanum comitis Dunal
- T Solanum commersonii Dunal – Commerson's nightshade
- Solanum complectens M.Nee & G.J.Anderson
- Solanum compressum L.B.Sm. & Downs
- Solanum comptum C.V.Morton
- Solanum concarense Hunz.
- Solanum concinnum Schott ex Sendtn.
- Solanum confertiflorum Stehmann & Tabosa
- Solanum confertiseriatum Bitter
- Solanum confine Dunal in DC.
- Solanum confusum C.V.Morton
- Solanum conglobatum Dunal in DC.
- Solanum conicum Ruiz & Pav.
- Solanum conocarpum L.C.Rich. ex Dunal – marron bacoba
- Solanum consimile C.V.Morton
- Solanum contumazaense Ochoa
- Solanum cookii Symon
- Solanum coquimbense J.R.Benn.
- Solanum coracinum Symon
- Solanum cordatum Forssk.
- Solanum cordicitum S.R. Stern, 2014
- Solanum cordifolium Dunal
- Solanum cordioides S.Knapp
- Solanum cordovense Sessé & Moc.
- Solanum coriaceum Dunal
- Solanum corifolium Mueller
- Solanum cormanthum Vell.
- Solanum corneliomulleri J.F.Macbr.
- Solanum cornifolium Dunal
- Solanum corumbense S.Moore
- Solanum corymbiflorum (Sendtn.) Bohs
- Solanum corymbosum Jacq.
- Solanum costatum M.Nee
- Solanum cowiei Martine
- Solanum crassinervium Tepe
- Solanum crassitomentosum Domin
- Solanum crebrispinum A.R.Bean
- Solanum cremastanthemum Werderm.
- Solanum crinitipes Dunal
- Solanum crinitum Lam.
- Solanum crispum Ruiz & Pav. – Chilean potato vine, Chilean nightshade, Chilean potato tree
- Solanum croatii D'Arcy & R.C.Keating
- Solanum crotonifolium Dunal
- Solanum crotonoides Lam.
- Solanum cruciferum Bitter
- Solanum cucullatum S.Knapp
- Solanum cunninghamii Benth.
- T Solanum curtilobum Juz. & Bukasov
- Solanum curvicuspe Domin
- Solanum cutervanum Zahlbr.
- Solanum cyaneopurpureum de Wild.
- Solanum cyanocarphium Blume
- Solanum cyathophorum M.Nee & Farruggia
- Solanum cyclophyllum S.Knapp
- Solanum cylindricum Vell.
- Solanum cymbalarifolium Chiov.

== D ==
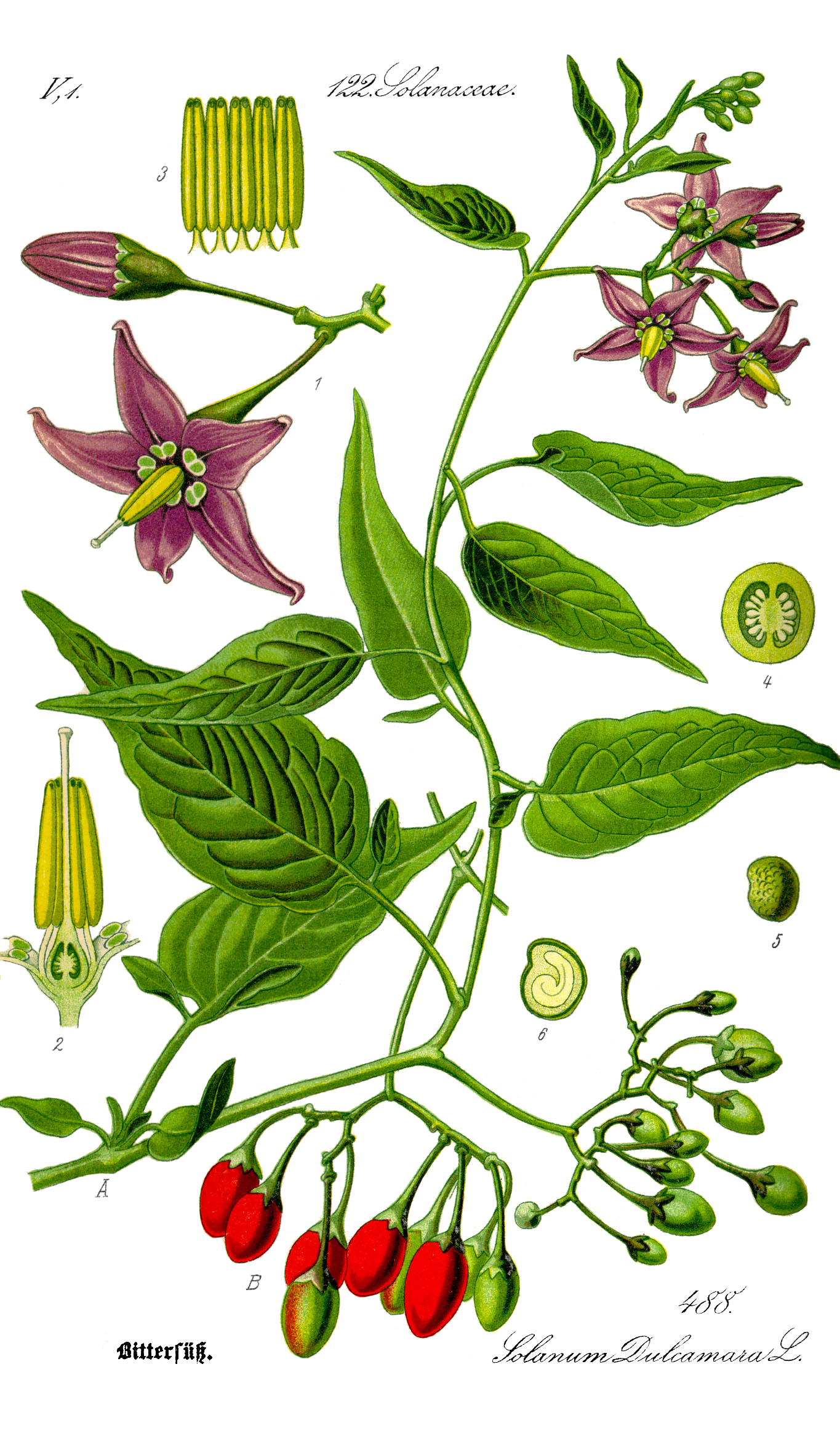
Illustration of Solanum dulcamara

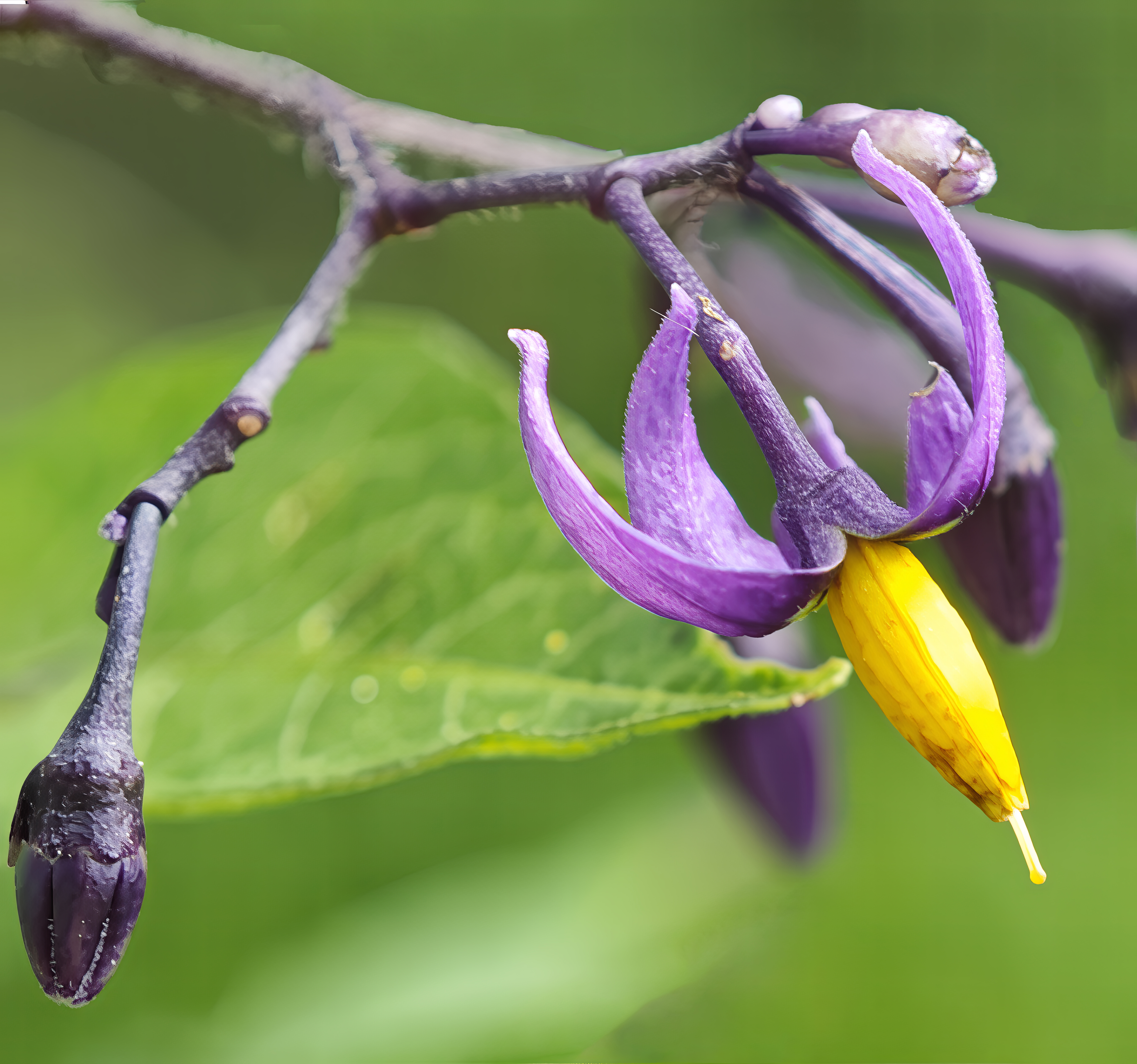
Flower of Solanum dulcamara

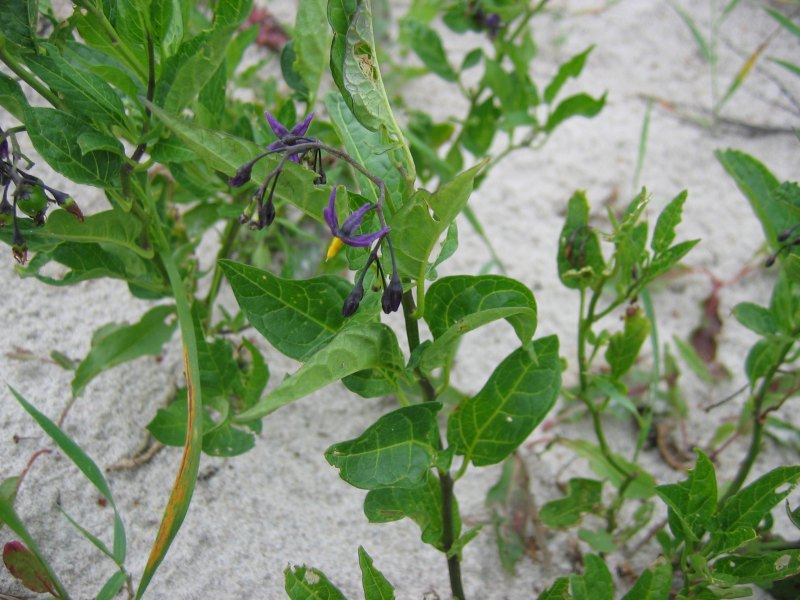
Solanum dulcamara, inflorescence and leaves

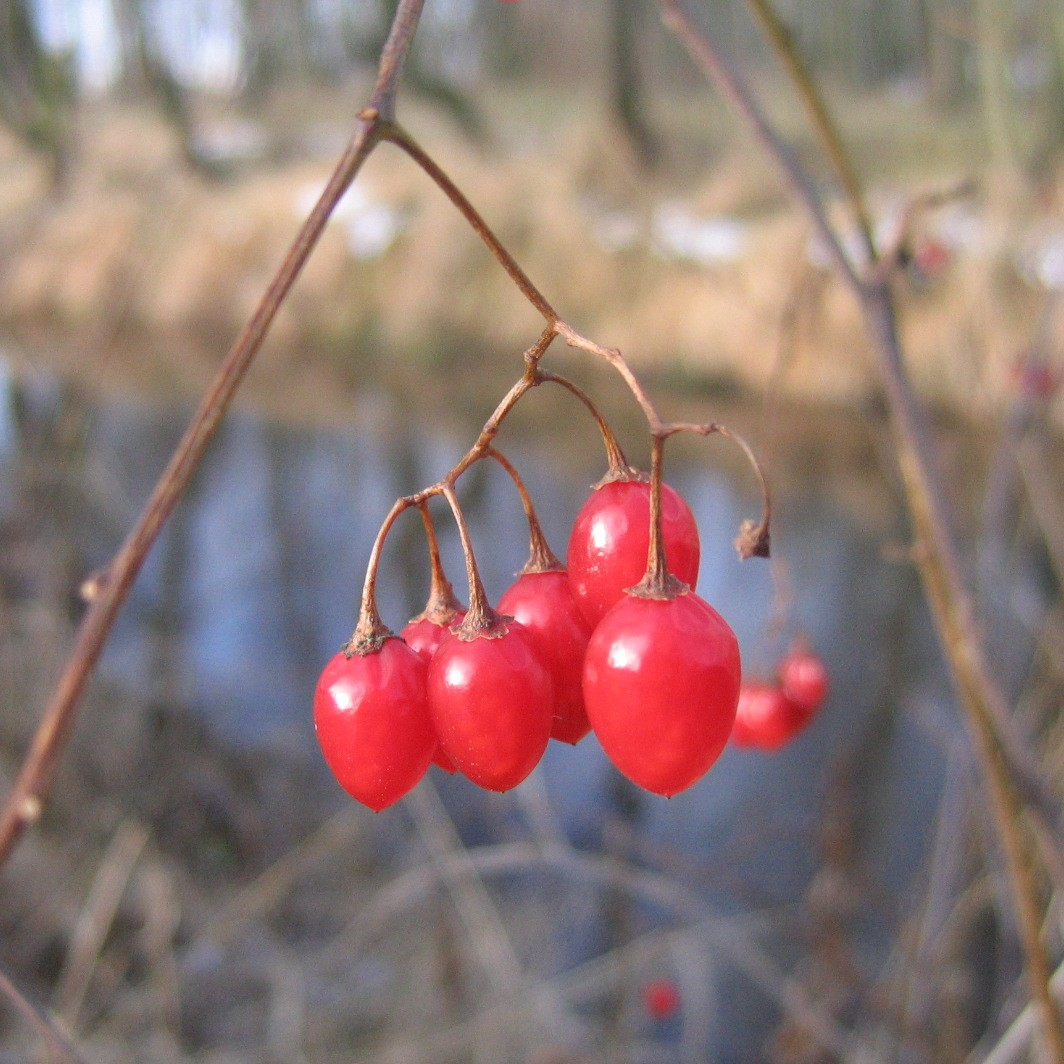
Detail of the fruit of Solanum dulcamara

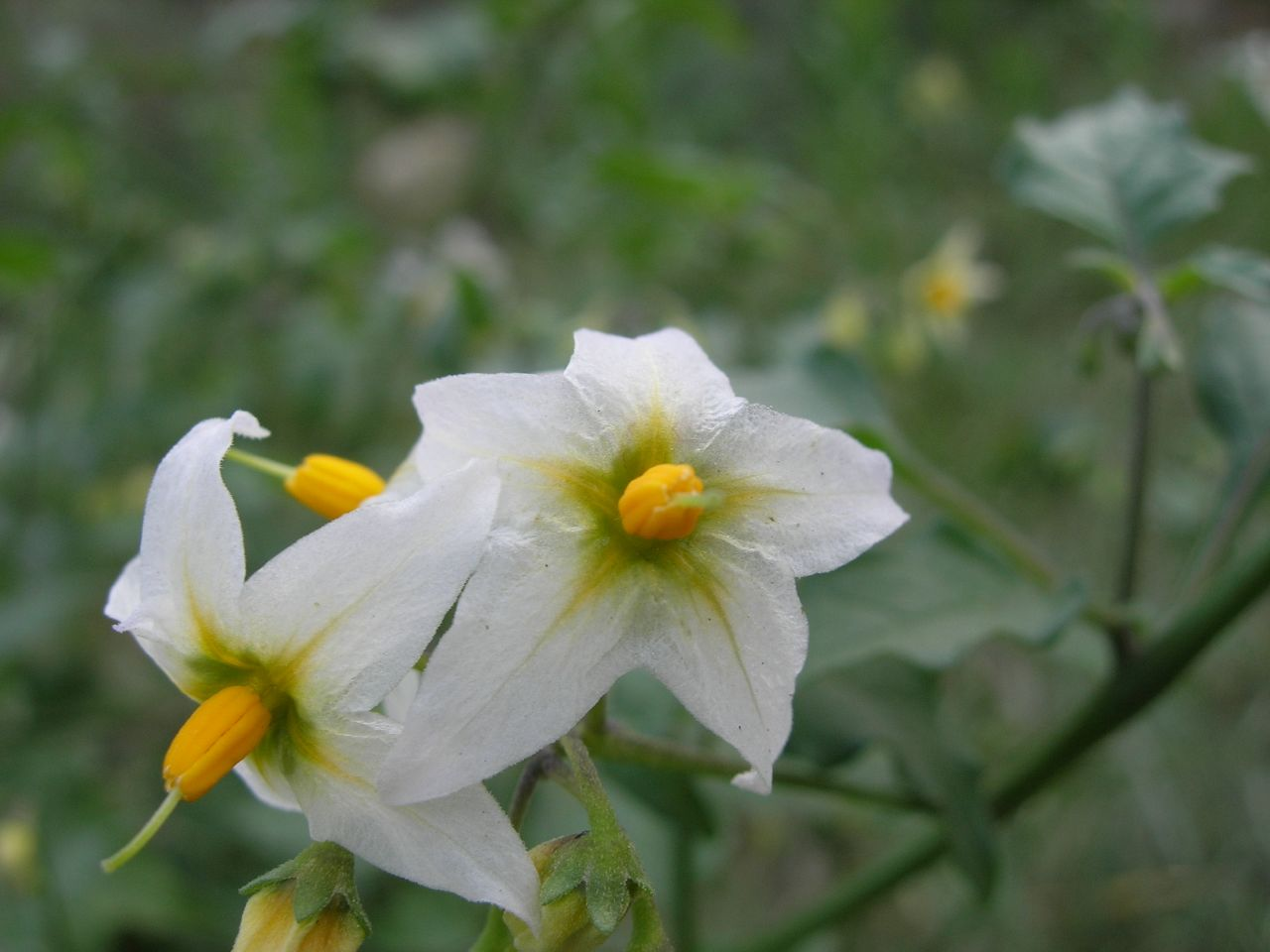
Detail of the flowers of Solanum douglasii

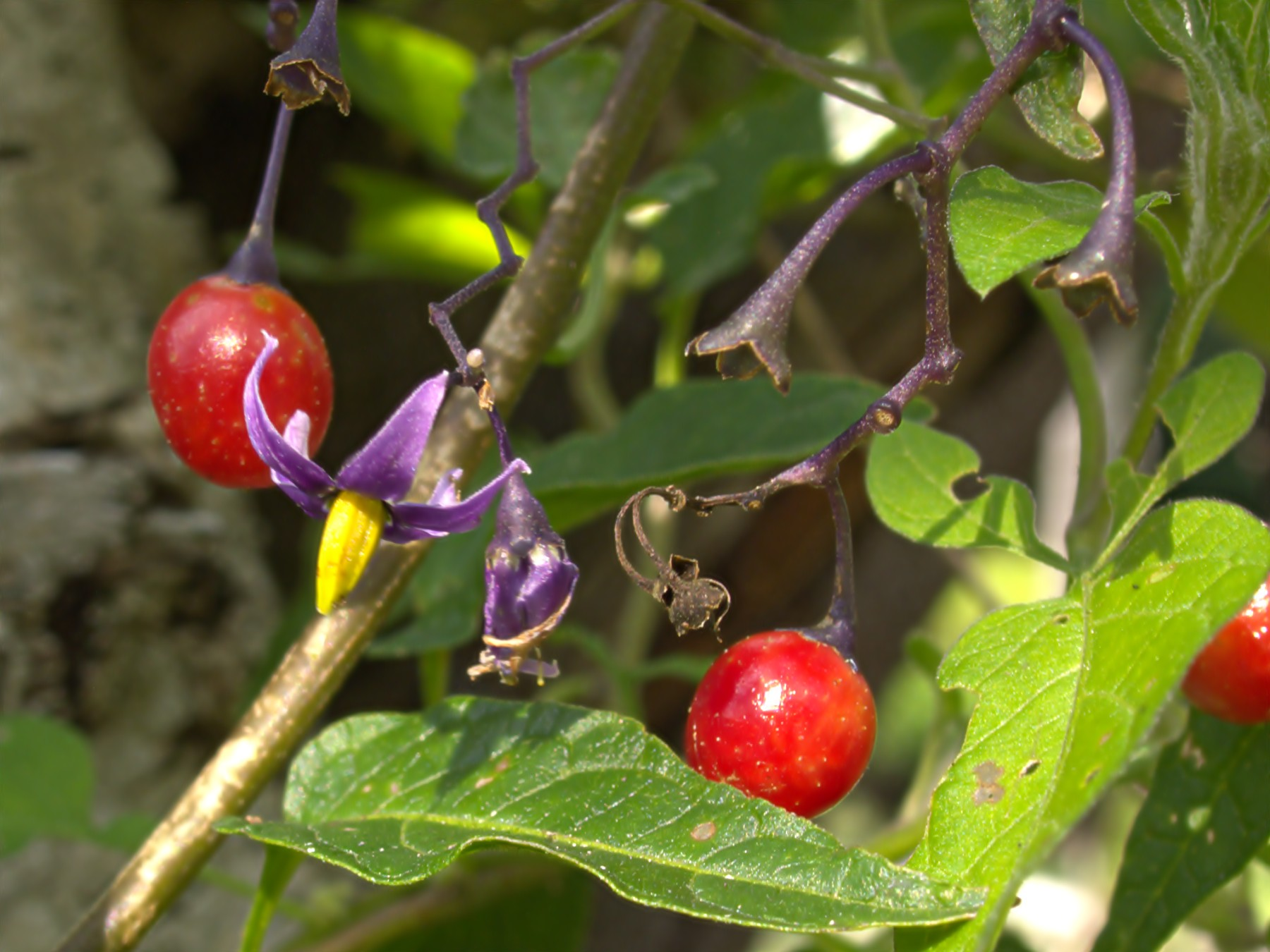
Solanum dulcamara

- Solanum dalibardiforme Bitter
- Solanum dallmannianum Warb.
- Solanum dammerianum Lauterb. & K.Schum.
- Solanum daphnophyllum Bitter
- Solanum darienense S.Knapp
- Solanum dasyanthum Brandegee
- Solanum dasyneuron S.Knapp
- Solanum dasyphyllum Schumach. & Thonn.
- Solanum davidsei Carvalho
- Solanum davisense Whalen. – Davis' horsenettle
- Solanum decompositiflorum Sendtn.
- Solanum decorum Sendtn.
- Solanum defensum Mueller
- Solanum deflexicarpum C. Y. Wu & S. C. Huang
- Solanum deflexiflorum Bitter .
- Solanum deflexum Greenm.
- Solanum delicatulum L.B.Sm. & Downs
- Solanum delitescens C.V.Morton
- T Solanum demissum Lindl. – dwarf wild potato
- Solanum dendroicum O.E.Schulz & Ekman
- Solanum dennekense Dammer
- Solanum denseaculeatum Symon .
- Solanum densevestitum Mueller ex Benth.
- Solanum depauperatum Dunal
- Solanum diamantinense M.F.Agra.
- Solanum dianthum Rusby
- Solanum dichroandrum Dunal
- Solanum didymum Dunal
- Solanum dillonii S.Knapp
- Solanum dimidiatum Raf. – western horsenettle
- Solanum dimorphandrum S.Knapp
- Solanum dimorphispinum C. White.
- Solanum dioicum W. Fitzg.
- Solanum diphyllum L. – twin-leaved nightshade
- Solanum diploconos (Mart.) Bohs
- Solanum discolor R.Br.
- Solanum dissectum Symon
- Solanum dissimile C.V.Morton
- Solanum distichophyllum Sendtn.
- Solanum ditrichum A.R.Bean
- Solanum diversiflorum Mueller
- Solanum diversifolium Dunal
- Solanum doddsii Correll
- T Solanum dolichocremastrum Bitter.
- Solanum dolichorhachis Bitter
- Solanum dolichosepalum Bitter
- Solanum dolosum S.Knapp
- Solanum donianum Walp. – mullein nightshade
- Solanum douglasii Dunal – green-spotted nightshade
- Solanum dryanderense A.R.Bean
- Solanum dulcamara L. – bittersweet
- Solanum dulcamaroides Dunal
- Solanum dumicola A.R.Bean
- Solanum dunalianum Gaudich.
- Solanum dysprosium A.R.Bean

== E ==
- Solanum eardleyae Symon
- Solanum eburneum Symon
- Solanum echegarayi Hieron.
- Solanum echidniforme Dunal
- Solanum echinatum R.Br.
- Solanum edinense Berthault
- Solanum edmonstonei Hook.f.
- Solanum edmundoi Cuevas & N.M. Núnez
- T Solanum ehrenbergii (Bitter) Rydb.
- Solanum eitenii Agra
- Solanum elachophyllum Mueller
- Solanum elaeagnifolium Cav. – silverleaf nightshade
- Solanum elatius A.R.Bean
- Solanum ellipticum R.Br.
- Solanum elvasioides S.Knapp
- Solanum eminens A.R.Bean
- Solanum emmottii A.R.Bean
- Solanum emulans Raf.
- Solanum enantiophyllanthum Bitter
- Solanum endoadenium Bitter
- Solanum endopogon (Bitter) Bohs
- Solanum ensifolium Dunal
- Solanum eremophilum Mueller
- Solanum erianthum D.Don – potato tree, mullein nightshade
- Solanum erosomarginatum S.Knapp
- Solanum erythracanthum Dunal
- Solanum erythrotrichum Fernald
- Solanum esuriale Lindl.
- T Solanum etuberosum Lindl.
- Solanum euacanthum Phil.
- Solanum evolvulifolium Greenm.
- Solanum evolvuloides Giacomin & Stehmann
- Solanum evonymoides Sendtn. in Mart.
- Solanum exarmatum Anil, Maya, Soumya & K.Murugan
- Solanum excisirhombeum Bitter
- Solanum exemptum A.R.Bean
- Solanum exiguum Bohs
- Solanum expedunculatum Symon

== F ==
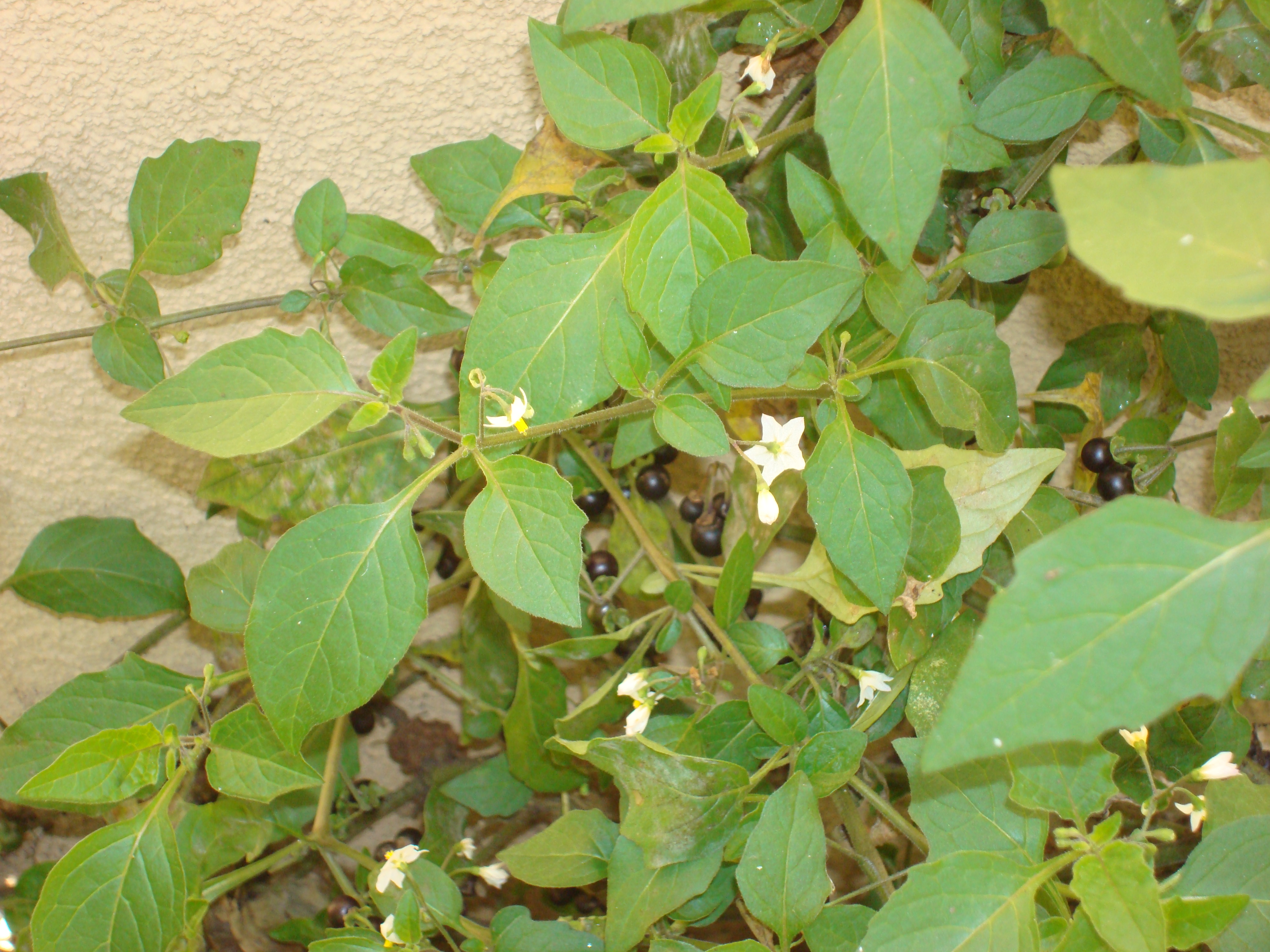
Solanum furcatum

- Solanum falciforme Farruggia
- Solanum falconense S.Knapp
- Solanum fallax Bohs
- Solanum fecundum A.R.Bean
- Solanum felinum Bitter ex Whalen
- Solanum fernandesii V. S. Sampaio & R. Moura, 2016
- T Solanum fernandezianum Phil.
- Solanum ferocissimum Lindl.
- Solanum ferrugineum Jacq.
- Solanum fervens A.R.Bean
- Solanum fiebrigii Bitter
- Solanum filiforme Ruiz & Pav.
- Solanum filirhachis Giacomin & Stehmann, 2015
- Solanum flaccidum Vell.
- Solanum flagellare Sendtn.
- T Solanum flahaultii Bitter.
- Solanum flexicaule Benth.
- Solanum foetens Pittier ex S.Knapp
- Solanum forskalii Dunal
- Solanum fortunense Bohs
- Solanum fosbergianum D'Arcy
- Solanum fragile Wedd.
- Solanum francisii A.R.Bean
- Solanum fraxinifolium Dunal
- Solanum friburgense Giacomin & Stehmann
- Solanum fulgens (J.F.Macbr.) K.E.Roe
- Solanum fulvidum Bitter
- Solanum furcatum Dunal
- Solanum furfuraceum R.Br.
- Solanum fusiforme L.B.Sm. & Downs

== G ==
- Solanum gabrielae Domin
- Solanum galactites A.R.Bean
- Solanum galapagense S.C.Darwin & Peralta
- Solanum galbinum A.R.Bean
- Solanum gandarillasii Cárdenas
- T Solanum garcia-barrigae Ochoa.
- Solanum gardneri Sendtn.
- Solanum gertii S.Knapp
- Solanum gibbsiae J.R.Drumm.
- Solanum giganteum Jacq.
- Solanum gilesii Symon Trans.
- Solanum gilioides Rusby
- Solanum glabratum Dunal
- Solanum glandulosipilosum Bitter
- Solanum glaucescens Zucc.
- Solanum glaucophyllum Desf.
- Solanum glomuliflorum Sendtn.
- Solanum glutinosum Dunal
- Solanum gnaphalocarpon Vell.
- Solanum goetzei Dammer
- Solanum gomphodes Dunal in DC
- Solanum goniocaulon S.Knapp
- Solanum gonocladum Dunal
- Solanum gonyrhachis S.Knapp
- Solanum goodspeedii K.E.Roe
- Solanum graciliflorum Dunal
- Solanum gracilifrons Bitter
- Solanum grandidentatum Phil.
- Solanum grandiflorum Ruiz & Pav.
- Solanum graniticola V.Samp. & Gouvêa
- Solanum graniticum A.R.Bean
- Solanum granulosoleprosum Dunal
- Solanum gratum Bitter
- Solanum graveolens Bunbury
- Solanum grayi Rose vars. grandiflorum (basal) and grayi (smaller-flowered in sympatry with Solanum lumholtzianum)
- Solanum guamense Merr.
- Solanum guaraniticum A.St.-Hil.
- Solanum guerreroense Correll
- Solanum guineense L.
- Solanum gundlachii Urb.
- Solanum gympiense Symon

== H ==
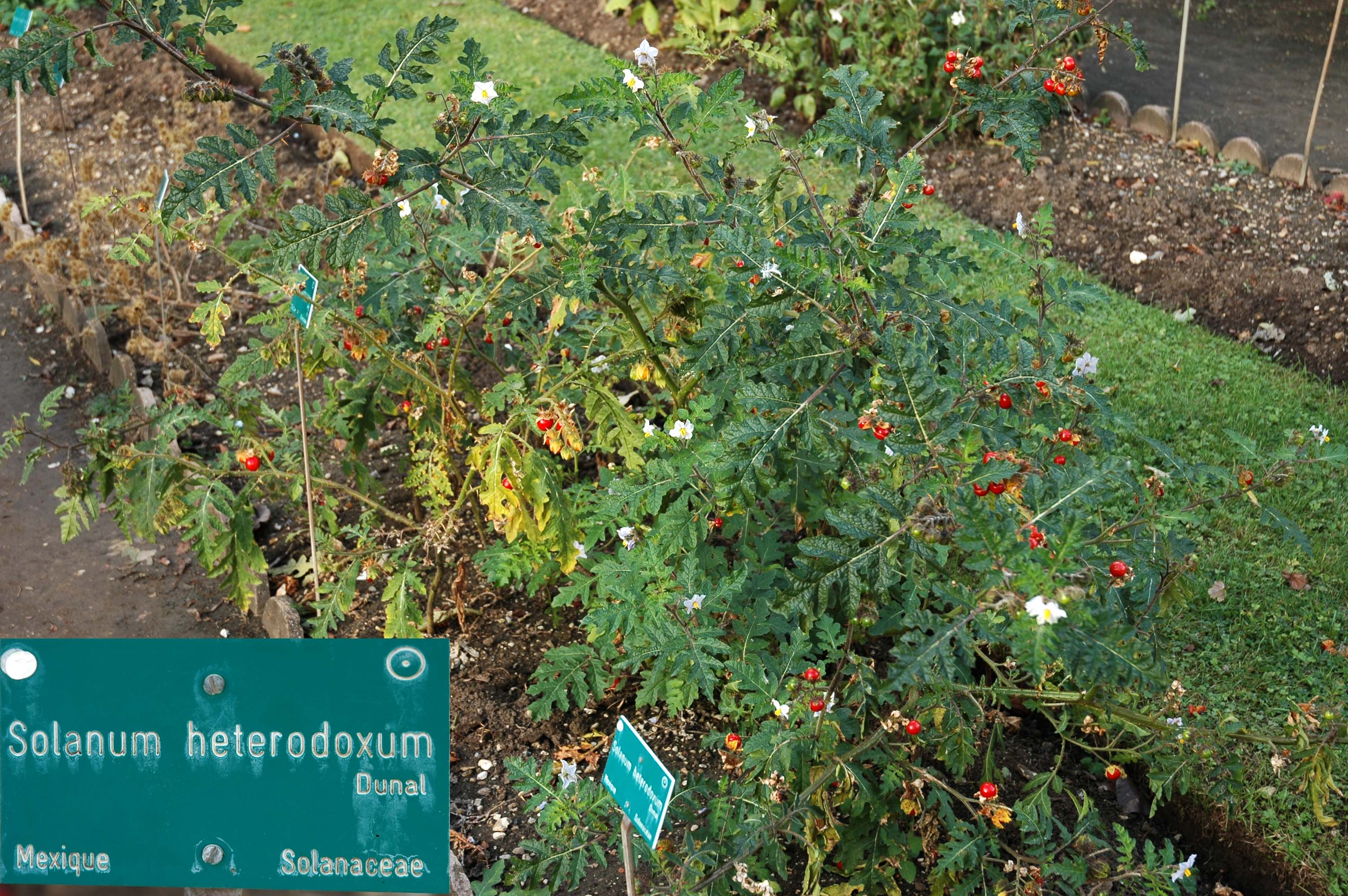
Growth habit of Solanum heterodoxum

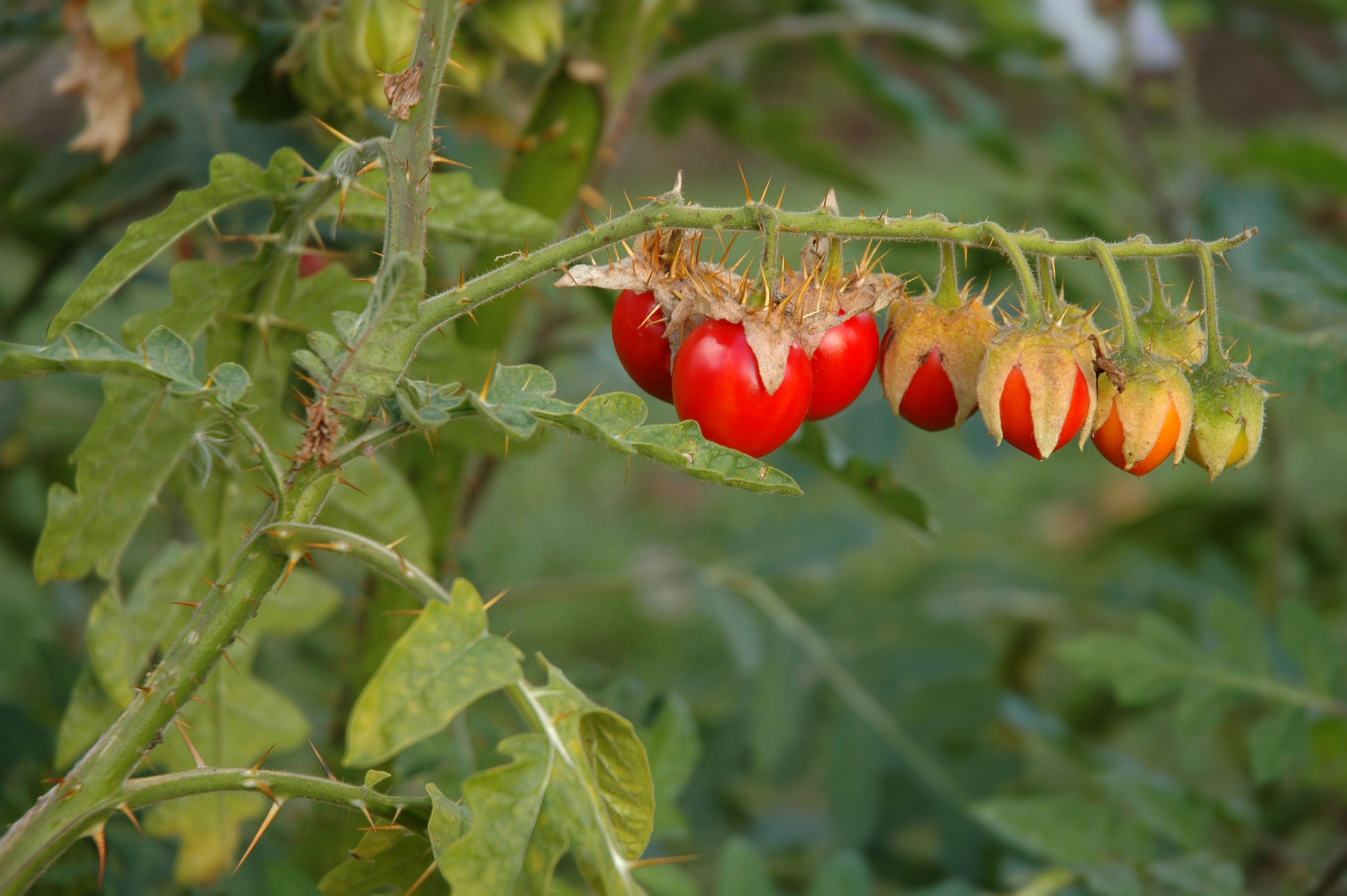
Fruit of Solanum heterodoxum. The fruit's persistent spiny sepals can also be seen.

- Solanum habrocaulon S.Knapp
- Solanum habrochaites S.Knapp & D.M.Spooner
- Solanum hamulosum C.T.White
- Solanum hapalum A.R.Bean
- Solanum harmandii Bonati
- Solanum hasslerianum Chodat
- Solanum hastifolium Hochst. ex Dunal
- T Solanum hastiforme Correll.
- Solanum havanense Jacq.
- Solanum hayesii Fernald
- Solanum hazenii Britton Bull.
- Solanum heinianum D'Arcy & R.C.Keating
- Solanum heiseri G.J.Anderson
- Solanum heleonastes S.Knapp
- Solanum helix Giacomin & Stehmann
- Solanum herba-bona Reiche
- Solanum herculeum Bohs
- Solanum hesperium Symon
- Solanum heterodoxum Dunal
- Solanum heteropodium Symon
- Solanum hexandrum Vell.
- Solanum hibernum Bohs
- Solanum hieronymi Kuntze
- Solanum hillebrandii H.St.John
- Solanum hindsianum Benth. – Hinds' nightshade
- T Solanum hintonii Correll
- Solanum hirtellum (Spreng.) Hassl.
- Solanum hirtulum Steud. ex A.Rich.
- Solanum hirtum Vahl Symb.
- T Solanum hjertingii Hawkes.
- Solanum hoehnei C.V.Morton
- Solanum hoffmanseggii Sendtn.
- Solanum homalospermum Chiarini
- Solanum hoplopetalum Bitter & Summerh.
- T Solanum hougasii Correll
- Solanum houstonii Martyn
- Solanum hovei Dunal
- Solanum huancabambense Ochoa
- Solanum huayavillense Del Vitto & Peten.
- Solanum huaylasense Peralta
- Solanum hugonis Heine
- Solanum huilense Bohs
- Solanum humblotii Dammer
- Solanum humboldtianum Granados-Tochoy & S.Knapp
- Solanum humectophilum Ochoa
- Solanum humile Lam. .
- Solanum hunzikeri Chiarini & Cantero
- Solanum hutchisonii (J.F.Macbr.) Bohs
- Solanum hydroides Gouvêa & Giacomin
- T Solanum hypacrarthrum Bitter
- Solanum hypaleurotrichum Bitter
- Solanum hypermegethes Werderm.
- Solanum hypocalycosarcum Bitter
- Solanum hyporhodium A.Braun & C.D.Bouché
- Solanum hystrix R.Br.

== I ==
- Solanum igniferum Gouvêa & Stehmann
- Solanum iltisii K.E.Roe
- Solanum imamense Dunal
- Solanum imbaburense S.Knapp
- Solanum imberbe Bitter
- T Solanum immite Dunal. A.DC.
- Solanum inaequilaterum Domin
- Solanum inaequiradians Werderm.
- Solanum inamoenum Benth.
- Solanum incanoalabastrum Symon
- Solanum incanum L.
- Solanum incarceratum Ruiz & Pav.
- Solanum incisum Griseb.
- Solanum incompletum Dunal
- Solanum incomptum Bitter
- Solanum incurvum Ruiz & Pav.
- Solanum indivisum Witasek ex J.R.Benn.
- Solanum inelegans Rusby Mem.
- T Solanum infundibuliforme Phil.
- Solanum infuscatum Symon
- Solanum innoxium A.R.Bean
- Solanum inodorum Vell.
- Solanum inornatum Witasek
- Solanum insidiosum Mart.
- Solanum insulae-pinorum Heine
- Solanum interandinum Bitter
- Solanum interius Rydb.
- Solanum intermedium Sendtn.
- Solanum intonsum A.R.Bean
- Solanum invictum A.R.Bean
- Solanum involucratum Blume
- Solanum iodinum A.R.Bean
- Solanum iodotrichum Van Heurck & Müll.Arg.
- Solanum ionidium Bitter
- T Solanum iopetalum (Bitter) Hawkes
- Solanum irregulare C.V.Morton
- Solanum isodynamum Sendtn.
- Solanum itatiaiae Dusén
- Solanum ivohibe D'Arcy & Rakot.

== J ==
- Solanum jabrense Agra & M.Nee
- Solanum jamaicense Mill.
- T Solanum jamesii Torr. – wild potato
- Solanum jobsonii Martine, J.Cantley & L.M.Lacey
- Solanum johnsonianum A.R.Bean
- Solanum johnstonii Whalen
- Solanum jubae Bitter
- Solanum jucundum A.R.Bean
- Solanum juglandifolium Dunal
- Solanum julocrotonoides Hassl.
- Solanum junctum S.R. Stern & M. Nee, 2014
- Solanum juninense Bitter
- Solanum jussiaei Dunal
- Solanum juvenale Thell.
- Solanum juzepczukii Bukasov

== K ==
- Solanum kachinense X.Aubriot & S.Knapp
- Solanum karsense Symon
- Solanum kentrocaule A.R.Bean
- Solanum kioniotrichum Bitter ex J.F.Macbr.
- Solanum kleinii L.B.Sm. & Downs
- Solanum knappiae Agra & V. S. Sampaio, 2016
- Solanum knoblochii (Whalen) S.R.Stern
- Solanum kollastrum Gouvêa & Giacomin
- Solanum kriegeri Giacomin & Stehmann, 2014
- Solanum kulliwaita S.Knapp
- T Solanum kurtzianum Bitter & Wittm.

== L ==
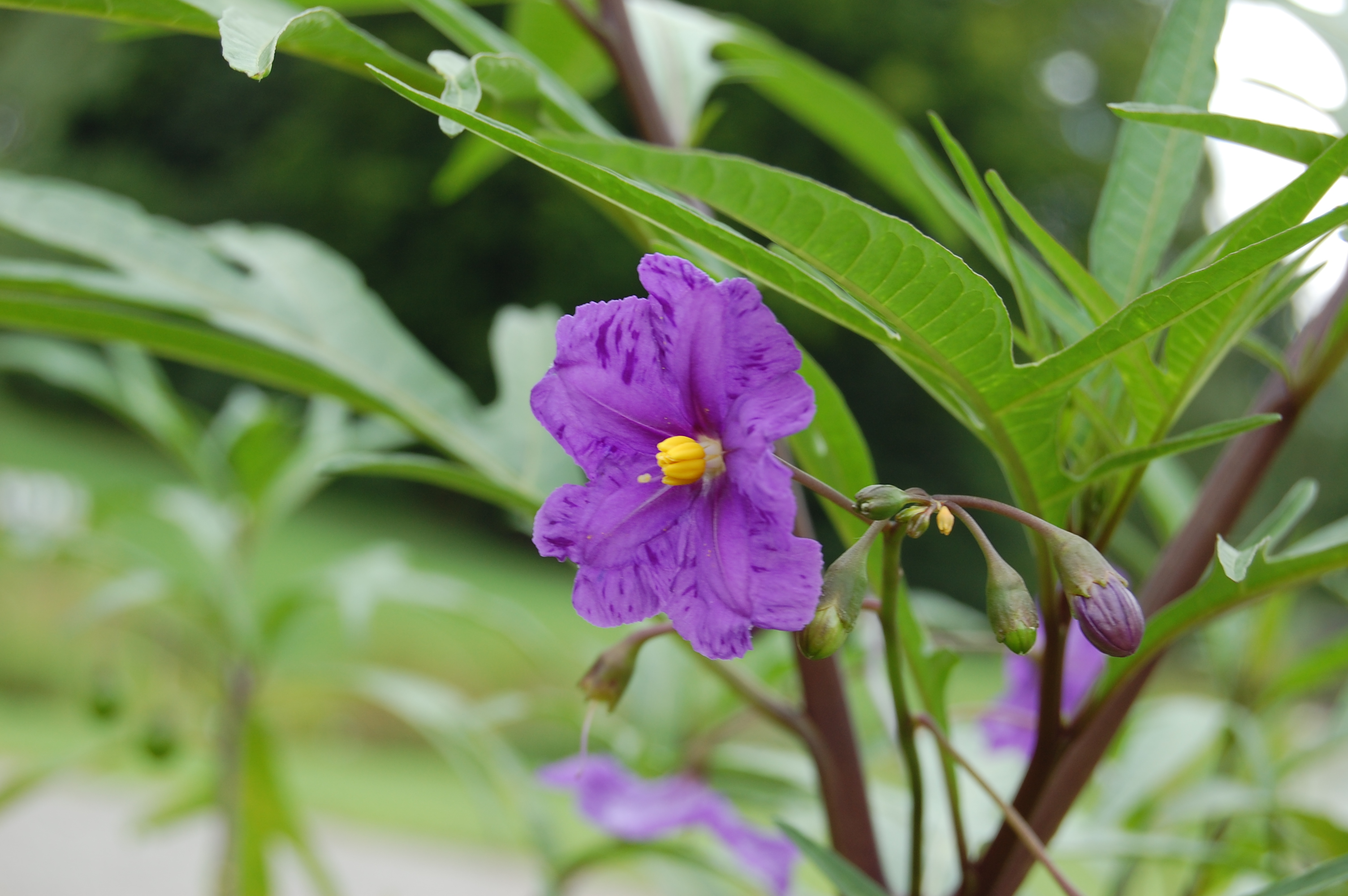
Flower of Solanum laciniatum

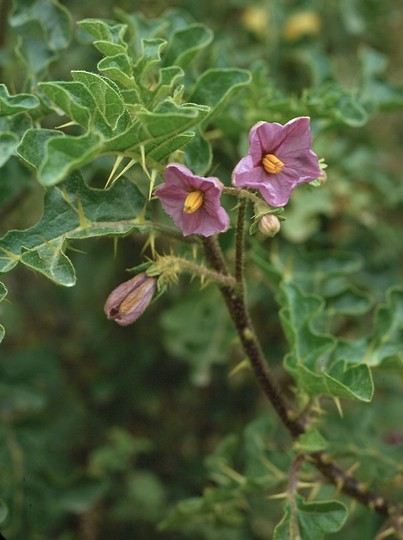
Flower and leaves of Solanum linnaeanum

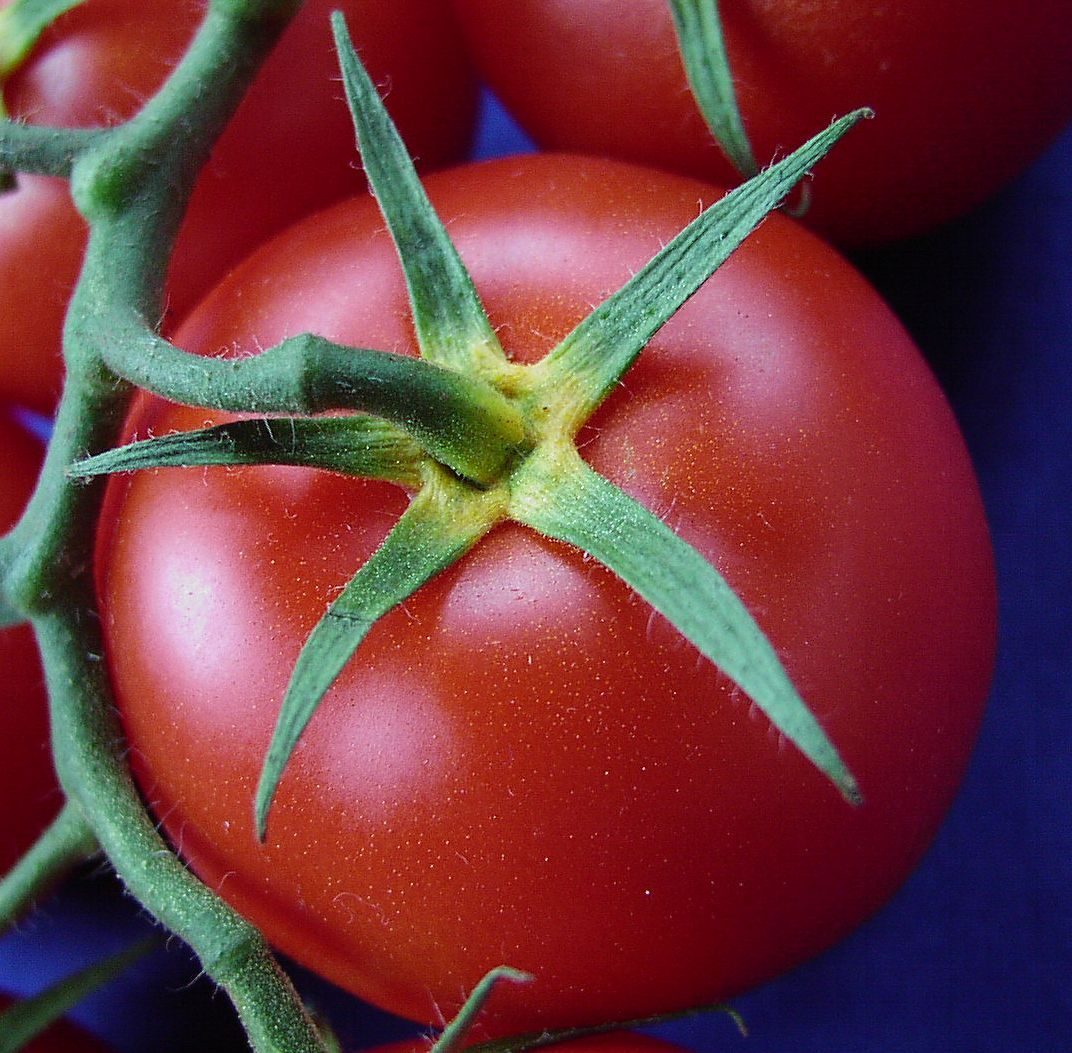
Fruit of Solanum lycopersicum (tomato)

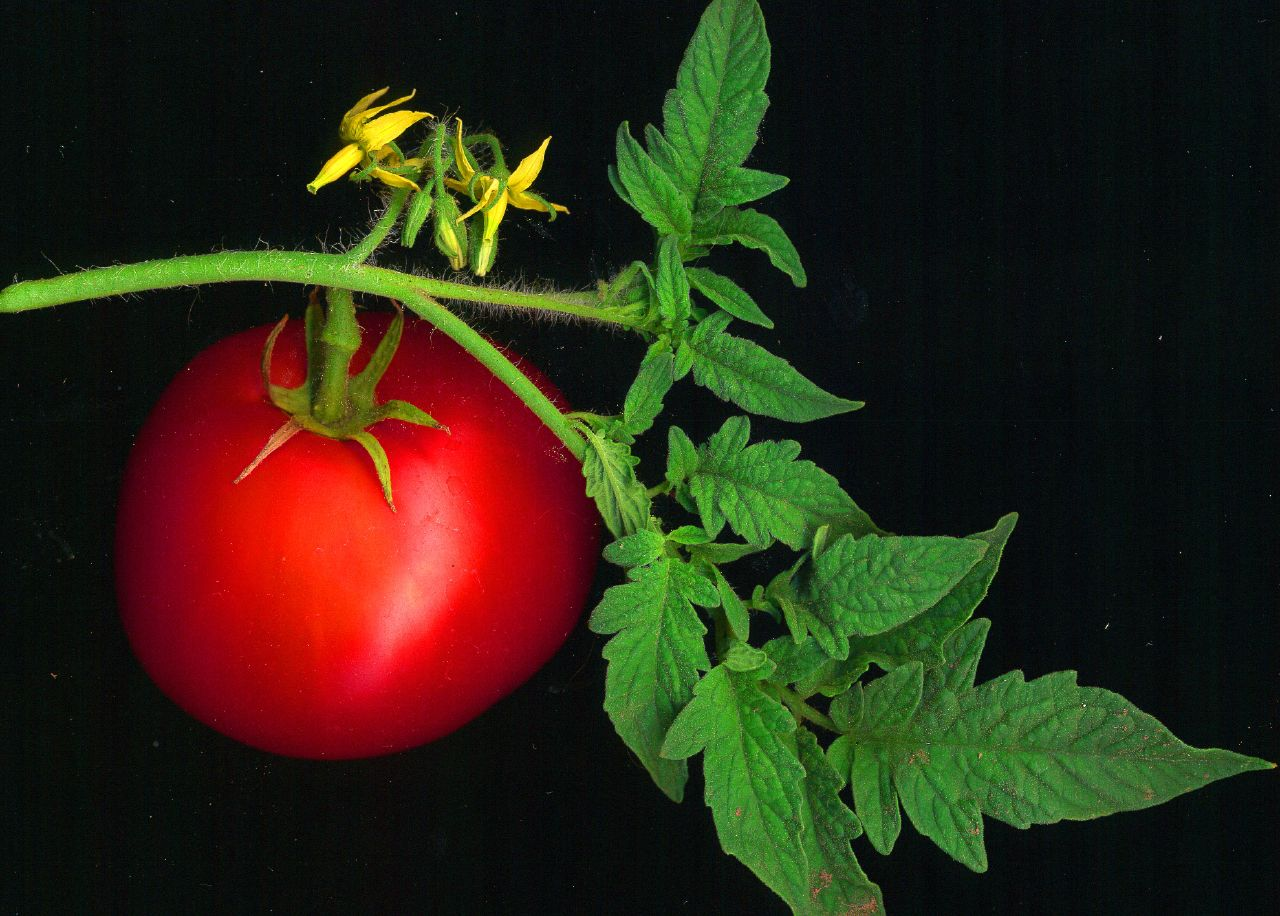
Solanum lycocarpum - wolf apple

- Solanum labyrinthinum D.H.R.McClell.
- Solanum lacerdae Dusén
- Solanum lachnophyllum Symon
- Solanum laciniatum Aiton
- Solanum lacteum Vell.
- Solanum lacunarium Mueller
- Solanum lagoense Stehmann
- Solanum lamprocarpum Bitter
- Solanum lanceifolium Jacq.
- Solanum lanceolatum Cav.
- Solanum lantana Sendtn.
- Solanum lanzae J.-P.Lebrun & Stork
- Solanum lapidosum A.R.Bean
- Solanum lasiocarpum Dunal – Indian nightshade, hairy-fruited eggplant, Thai hairy-fruited eggplant
- Solanum lasiocladum S.Knapp
- Solanum lasiophyllum Dunal
- Solanum lasiopodium Dunal
- Solanum latens A.R.Bean
- Solanum latiflorum Bohs
- Solanum laurifrons Bitter
- Solanum laxissimum Bitter
- Solanum laxum Spreng. – jasmine nightshade
- Solanum leiophyllum Benth.
- Solanum leontopodium Sendtn.
- Solanum leopoldensis Symon
- Solanum lepidotum Dunal
- Solanum leptacanthum Merrill & L.M.Perry
- Solanum leptocaulon Van Heurck & Müll.Arg.
- Solanum leptopodum Van Heurck & Müll.Arg.
- Solanum leptorhachis Bitter
- Solanum leptostachys Dunal
- Solanum leratii Schltr.
- T Solanum lesteri Hawkes & Hjert.
- Solanum leucandrum Whalen
- Solanum leucocarpon Dunal
- Solanum leucodendron Sendtn.
- Solanum leucopogon Huber
- Solanum levigatum Dunal
- Solanum lhotskyanum Dunal
- Solanum lichtensteinii Willd.
- Solanum lidii Sunding
- Solanum lignescens Fernald
- Solanum lignicaule Vargas
- Solanum limbaniense Ochoa
- Solanum limitare A.R.Bean
- Solanum limoncochaense Tepe
- Solanum lindenii Rusby
- Solanum linearifolium Geras. ex Symon
- Solanum linnaeanum Hepper & P.-M.L.Jaeger
- Solanum lithophilum F.Muell.
- Solanum litoraneum A.E.Gonç.
- Solanum lobatum A.R.Bean
- Solanum lobbianum Bitter
- Solanum longevirgatum Bitter
- T Solanum longiconicum Bitter
- Solanum longifilamentum Särkinen & P.Gonzáles
- Solanum loxophyllum Bitter
- Solanum lucani F.Muell.
- Solanum lucens S.Knapp
- Solanum luculentum C.V.Morton ex S.Knapp
- Solanum lumholtzianum Bartlett
- Solanum luridifuscescens Bitter
- Solanum luteoalbum Pers.
- Solanum luzoniense Merrill
- Solanum lycocarpum St.-Hil. – wolf apple, fruta-de-lobo, lobeira (Brazil)
- Solanum lycopersicoides Dunal – Peruvian wolfpeach
- Solanum lycopersicum L. – tomato
- Solanum lyratum Thunb.
- Solanum lythrocarpum A.R.Bean

== M ==
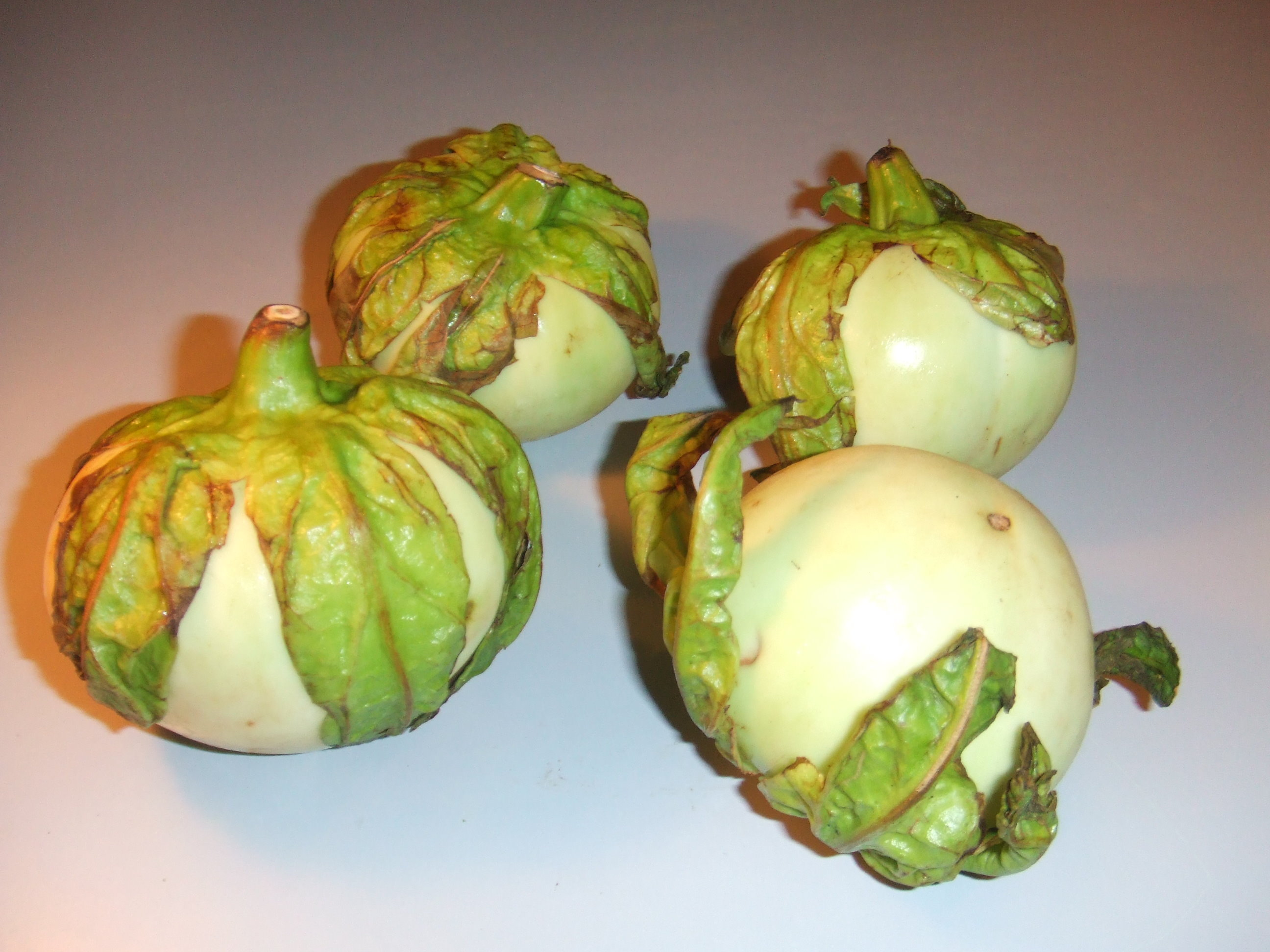
Fruit of Solanum macrocarpon

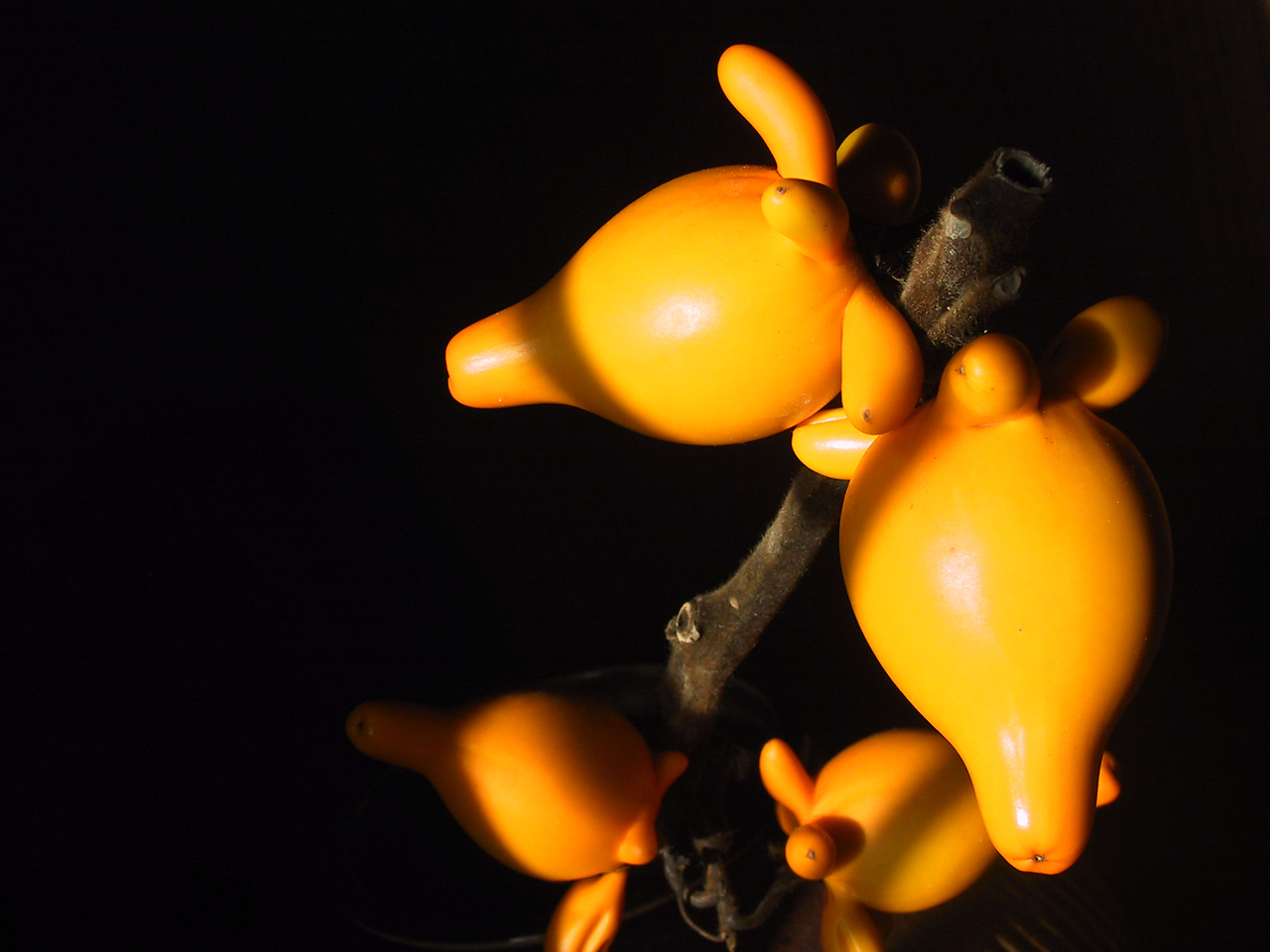
Fruit of Solanum mammosum

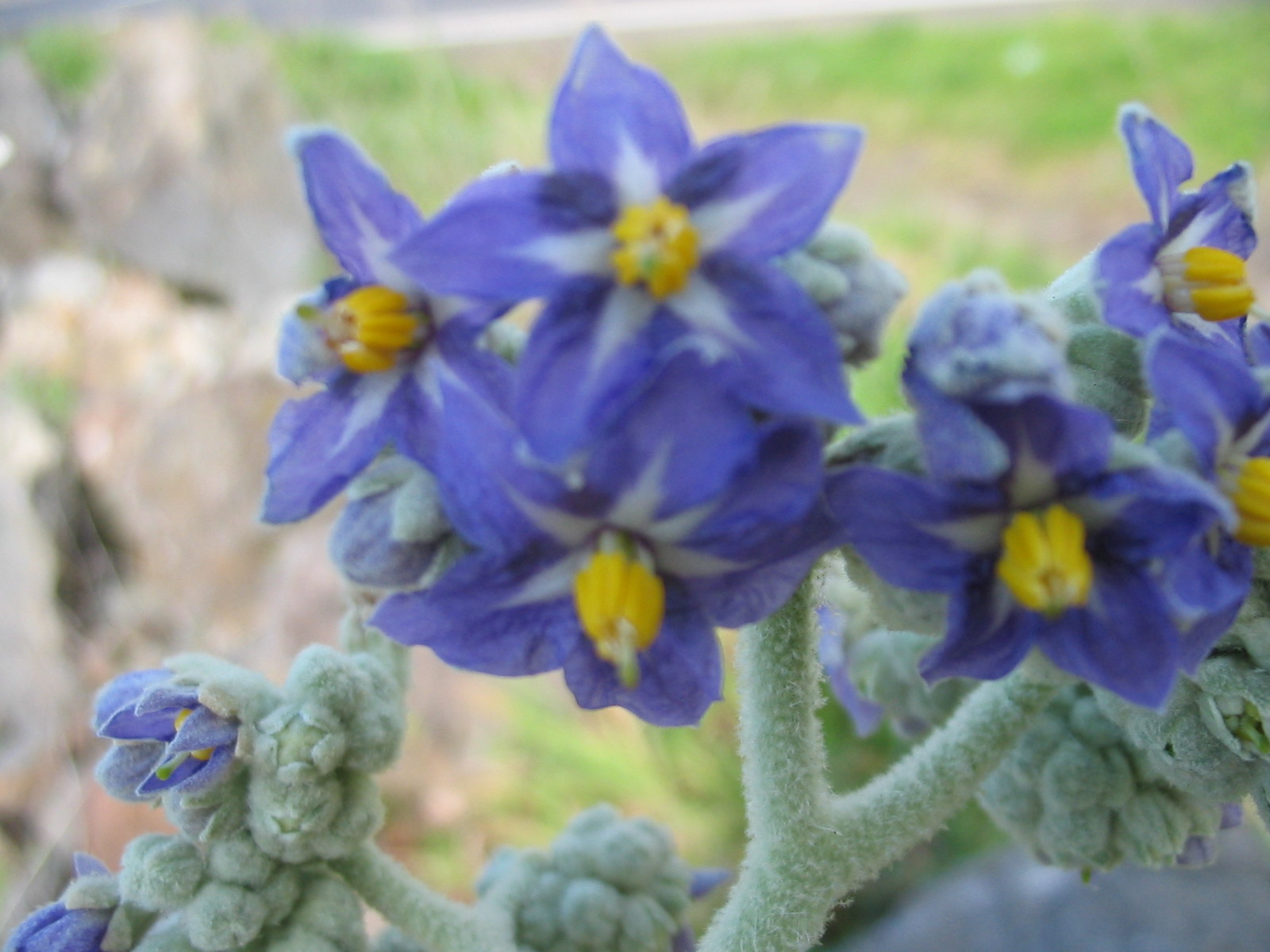
Flowers of Solanum mauritianum

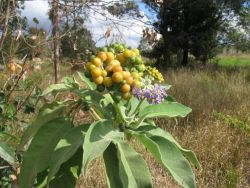
Solanum mauritianum

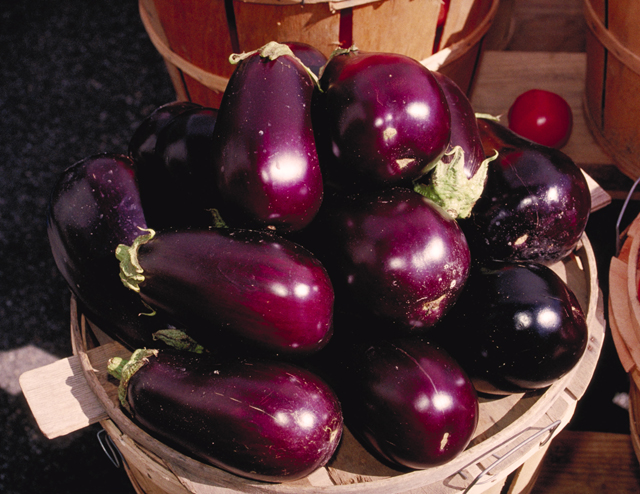
Fruit of Solanum melongena (aubergine)

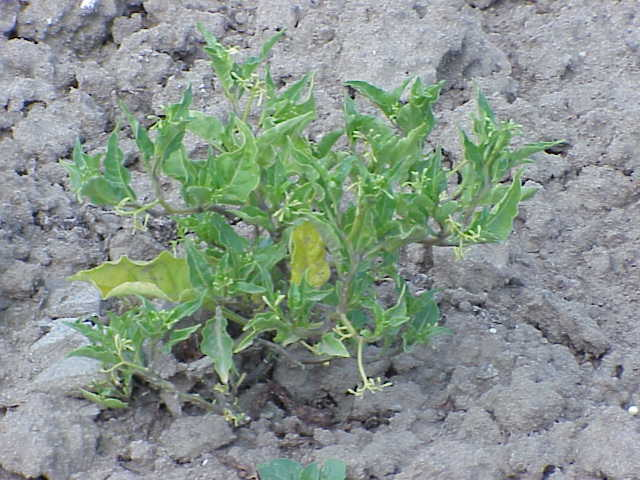
Habit of Solanum morelliforme

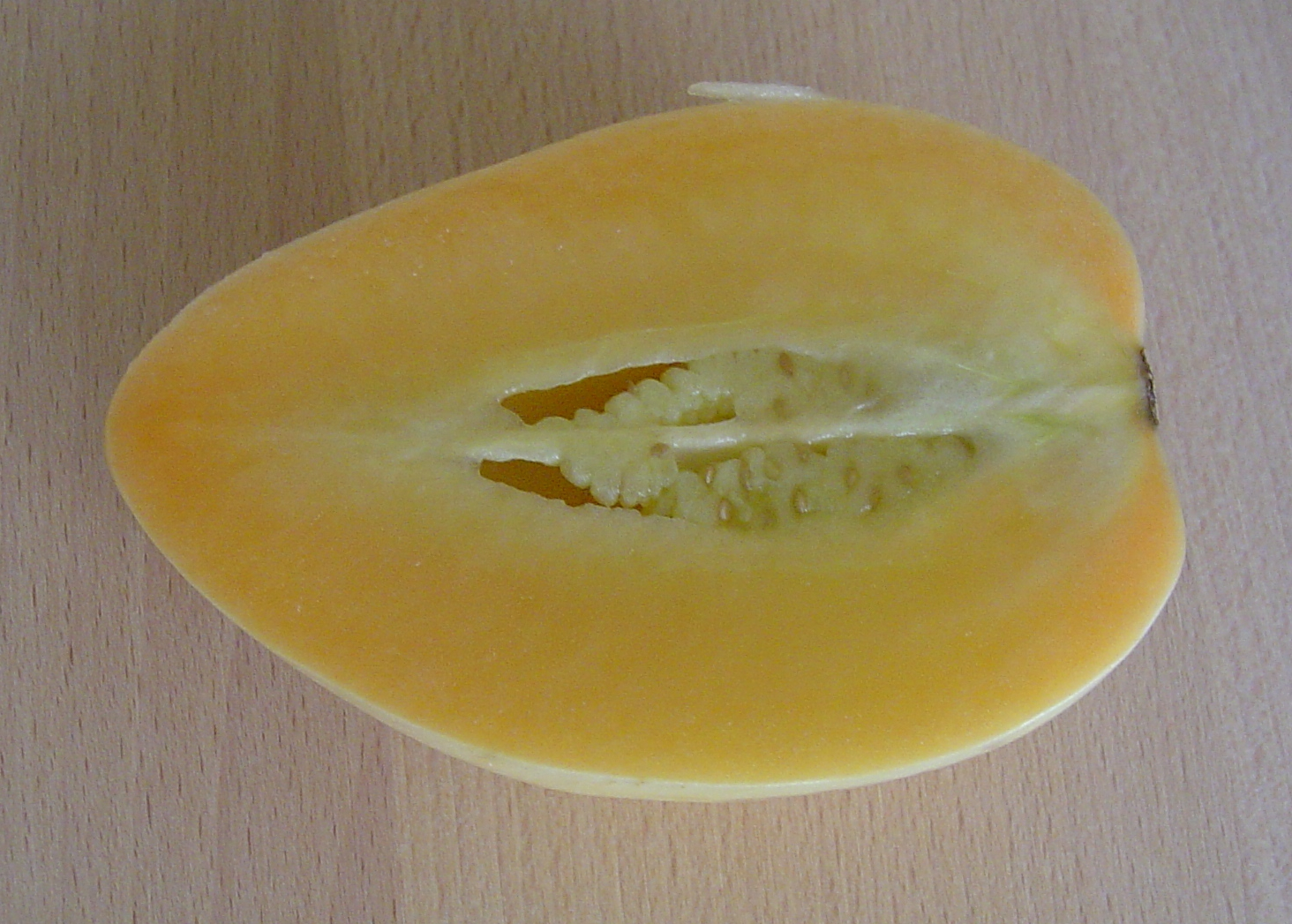
Fruit Solanum muricatum in cross section.

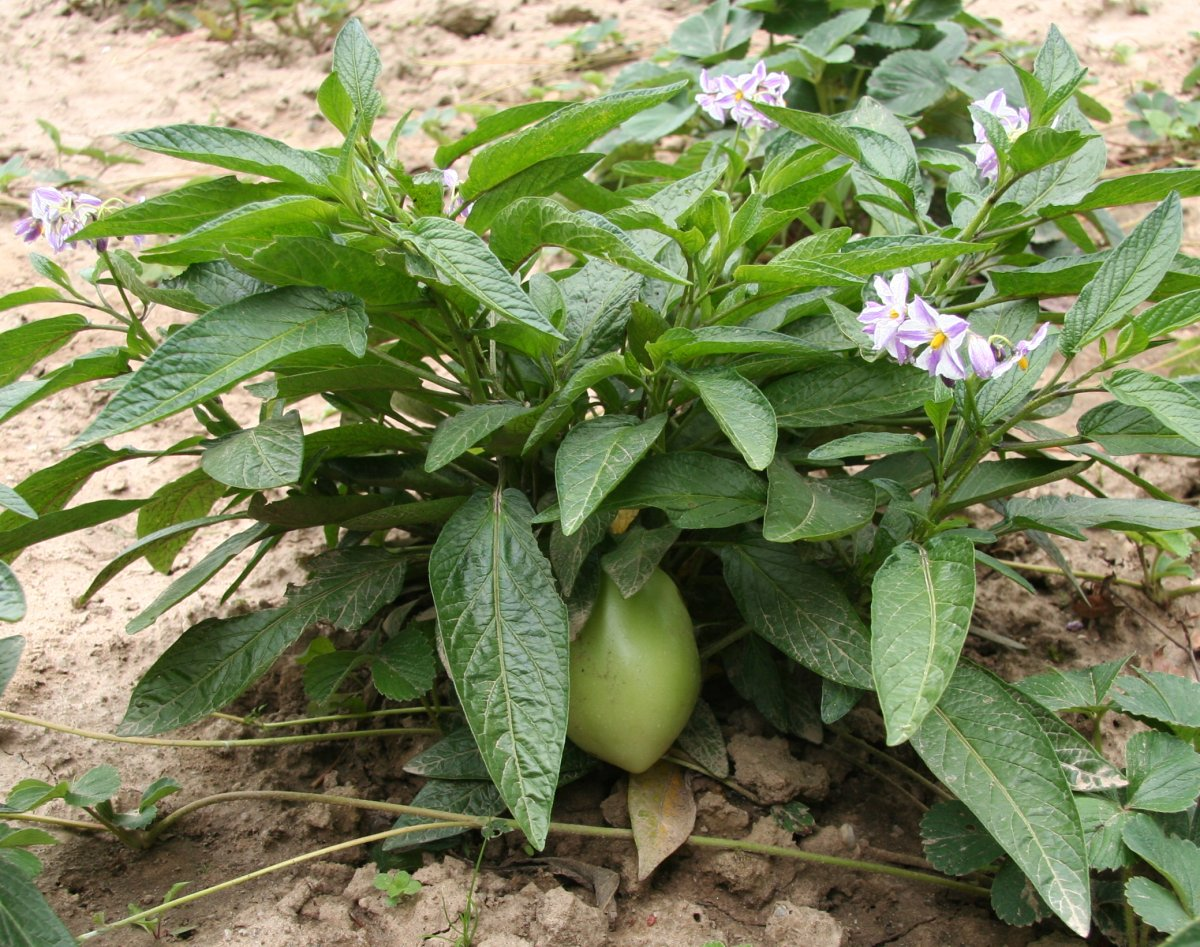
Solanum muricatum

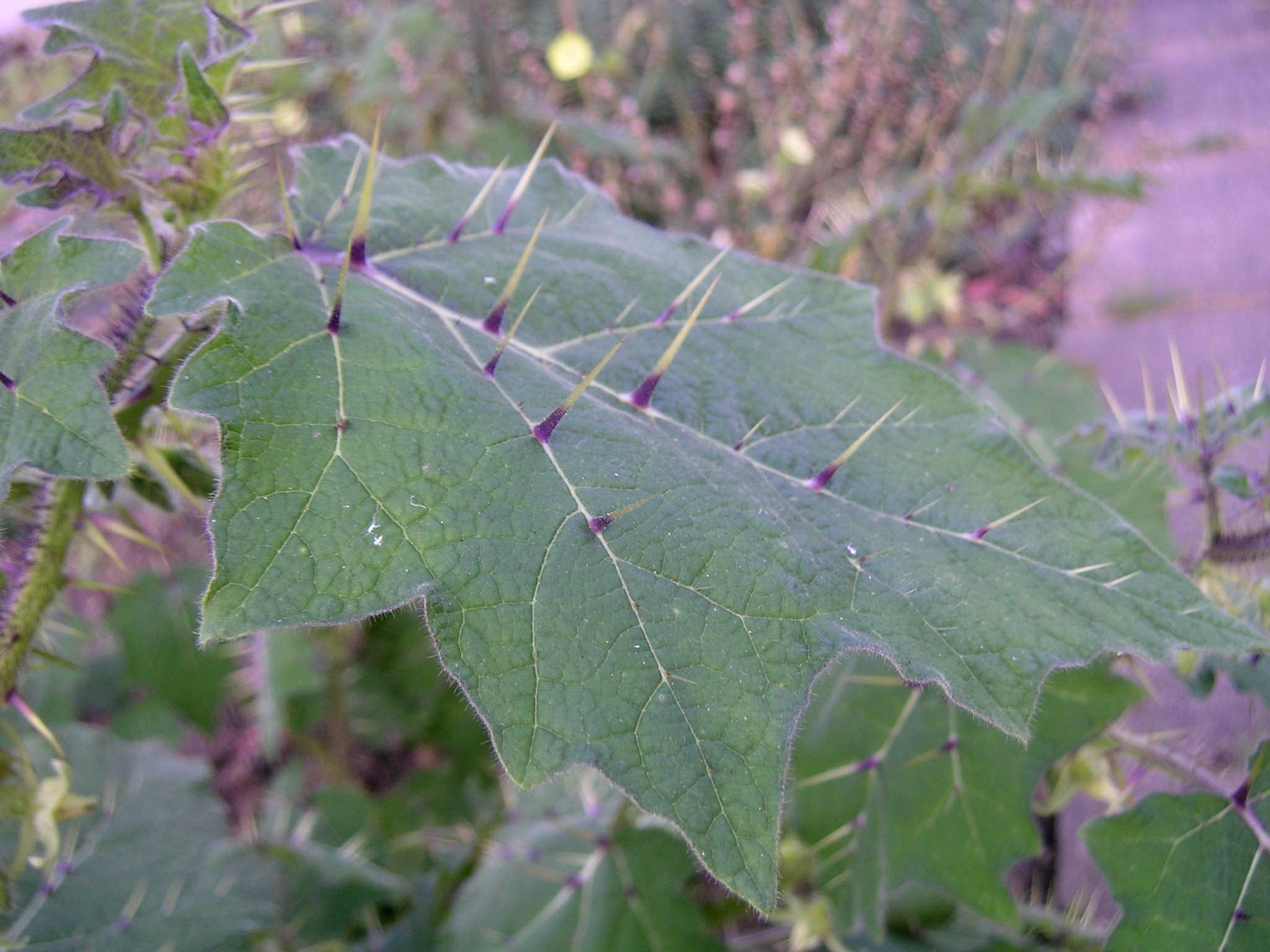
Spiny leaf of Solanum myriacanthum

- Solanum macbridei Hunz. & Lallana
- Solanum macoorai F.M.Bailey
- Solanum macracanthum A.Rich.
- Solanum macrocarpon L.
- Solanum macrothyrsum Dammer
- Solanum macrotonum Bitter
- Solanum madagascariense Dunal
- Solanum maestrense Urb.
- T Solanum maglia Schltdl.
- Solanum magnifolium Mueller
- Solanum mahoriense D'Arcy & Rakot.
- Solanum malacothrix S.Knapp
- Solanum malignum A.R.Bean
- Solanum malindiense Voronts.
- Solanum malletii S.Knapp
- Solanum malmeanum Bitter
- Solanum mammosum L.
- Solanum manabiense S.R.Stern
- Solanum mapiricum S.Knapp
- Solanum mapiriense Bitter
- Solanum maranguapense Bitter
- Solanum marantifolium Bitter
- Solanum marginatum L.f.
- Solanum mariae Särkinen & S. Knapp, 2015
- Solanum marmoratum Barboza & S.Knapp
- Solanum martii Sendtn.
- Solanum matadori Smith & Downs
- Solanum maternum Bohs
- Solanum maturecalvans Bitter
- Solanum mauense Bitter
- Solanum mauritianum Scop. – woolly nightshade, ear-leaved nightshade, flannel weed, bugweed, tobacco weed, kerosene plant, "wild tobacco" (Australia)
- T Solanum medians Bitter
- Solanum medicagineum A.R.Bean
- Solanum medusae Gouvêa
- Solanum megalochiton Mart.
- Solanum megalonyx Sendtn.
- Solanum megaspermum Agra
- Solanum melanospermum Mueller
- Solanum melastomoides C.H.Wright
- Solanum melissarum Bohs
- Solanum mellobarretoi Agra & Stehmann
- Solanum melongena L. Eggplant
- Solanum memaoyanum D.H.R.McClell.
- Solanum memphiticum J.F.Gmel.
- Solanum mentiens A.R.Bean
- Solanum metrobotryon Dunal
- Solanum michaelis Särkinen & S. Knapp, 2016
- T Solanum michoacanum Rydb.
- T Solanum microdontum Bitter.
- Solanum microleprodes Bitter
- Solanum microphyllum (Lam.) Dunal
- Solanum milnei Seem.
- Solanum minutifoliolum Correll
- Solanum missimense Symon
- Solanum mitchellianum Domin
- Solanum mite Ruiz & Pav.
- Solanum mitlense Dunal
- Solanum miyakojimense T.Yamaz. & A.Takushi
- T Solanum mochiquense Ochoa.
- Solanum moense Britton & Wilson
- Solanum monachophyllum Dunal
- Solanum monadelphum Van Heurck & Müll.Arg.
- Solanum monanthemon S.Knapp
- Solanum monarchostemon S.Knapp
- Solanum montanum L.
- Solanum morellifolium Bohs
- T Solanum morelliforme Bitter & Münch
- Solanum morii S.Knapp
- Solanum mortonii Hunz.
- Solanum moxosense M.Nee
- Solanum muansense Dammer
- Solanum muenscheri Standl. & Steyerm.
- Solanum multifidum Lam.
- Solanum multiflorum Roth
- Solanum multiglandulosum Bitter
- Solanum multiglochidiatum Domin
- Solanum multiinterruptum Bitter
- Solanum multispinum N.E.Br.
- Solanum multivenosum Symon
- Solanum muricatum Aiton Hort. – pepino dulce, pepino melon, melon pear, "pepino", "tree melon"
- Solanum murinum Sendtn.
- Solanum myoxotrichum Baker
- Solanum myriacanthum Dunal
- Solanum myrsinoides D'Arcy & Rakot.

== N ==
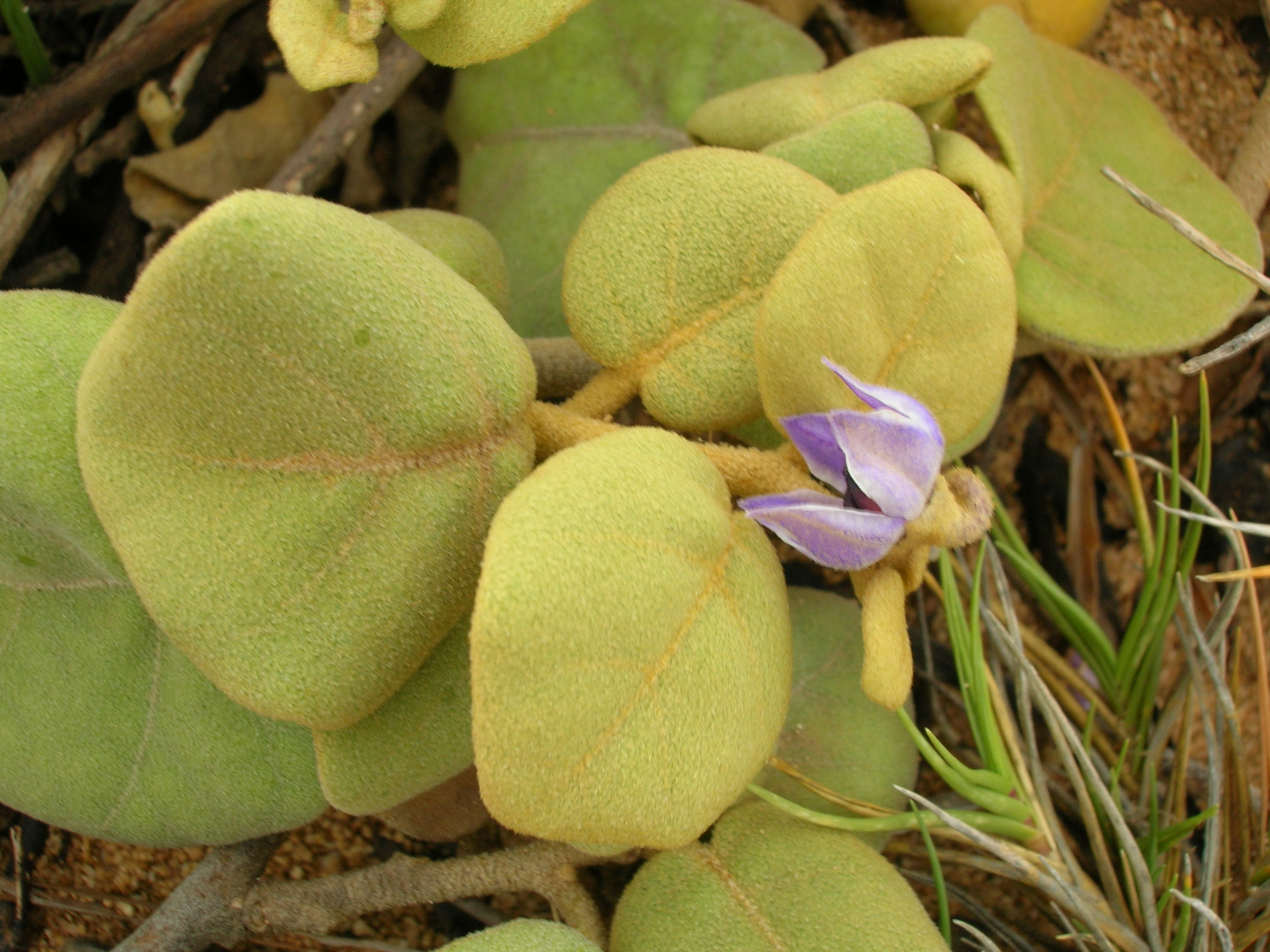
Flower of Solanum nelsonii

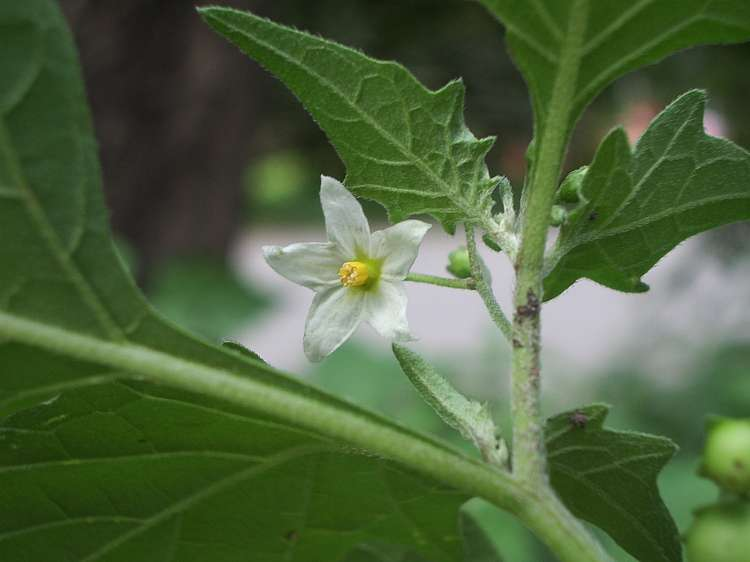
Leaves and flower of Solanum nigrum

- Solanum narcoticosmum Bitter
- Solanum naucinum S.Knapp
- Solanum nava Webb & Berthel.
- Solanum nectarifolium Martine, Brennan, Cantley, Webb & Newton – Tanami bush tomato
- Solanum neei Chiarini & L.A. Mentz
- Solanum nelsonii Dunal – Nelson's horsenettle
- Solanum nematopus Sendtn.
- Solanum nematorhachis S.Knapp
- Solanum nemophilum Mueller
- Solanum nemorense Dunal
- Solanum neoanglicum A.R.Bean
- T Solanum neocardenasii Hawkes & Hjert.
- Solanum neorickii D.M.Spooner, G.J.Anderson & R.K.Jansen
- Solanum neorossii Hawkes & Hjert.
- T Solanum neoweberbaueri Wittm.
- Solanum nienkui Merrill & Chun
- Solanum nigrescens M.Martens & Galeotti – divine nightshade
- Solanum nigricans M.Martens & Galeotti
- Solanum nigriviolaceum Bitter
- Solanum nigrum L. – European black nightshade, "black nightshade"
- Solanum nitidibaccatum Bitter
- Solanum nitidum Ruiz & Pav.
- Solanum nobile A.R.Bean
- Solanum nolense Symon
- Solanum novomexicanum (Bartlett) S.R.Stern
- Solanum nubicola Ochoa
- Solanum nudum Dunal – forest nightshade
- Solanum nummularium S.Moore
- Solanum nuricum M.Nee
- Solanum nutans Ruiz & Pav.

== O ==
- Solanum obliquum Ruiz & Pav.
- Solanum oblongifolium Humb. & Bonpl. ex Dunal
- Solanum oblongum Ruiz & Pav.
- Solanum obovalifolium Pittier ex Benítez
- Solanum occultum Bohs
- Solanum ochranthum Humb. & Bonpl. ex Dunal
- Solanum ochrophyllum Van Heurck & Müll.Arg.
- Solanum octonum A.R.Bean
- Solanum odoriferum Vell.
- Solanum oedipus Symon
- T Solanum okadae Hawkes & Hjert.
- Solanum oldfieldii Mueller
- Solanum oligacanthum Mueller
- Solanum oligandrum Symon
- Solanum oliveirae Carvalho
- Solanum ombrophilum Pittier ex S.Knapp
- Solanum olmosense Ochoa
- Solanum olympicum Hassl.
- Solanum oocarpum Sendtn.
- Solanum oomsis A.R.Bean
- Solanum opacum A.Braun & Bouché .
- Solanum oppositifolium Ruiz & Pav.
- Solanum orbiculatum Dunal
- Solanum orbignianum Sendtn.
- Solanum orgadophilum A.R.Bean
- Solanum orthacanthum O.E.Schulz
- Solanum ortivum A.R.Bean
- Solanum ossicruentum Martine & J.Cantley
- Solanum osteocarpum A.R.Bean
- Solanum ovalifolium Humb. & Bonpl. ex Dunal
- Solanum ovum-fringillae (Dunal) Bohs
- Solanum oxapampense S.Knapp
- Solanum oxycarpum Schiede
- Solanum oxycoccoides Bitter
- Solanum oxyphyllum C.V.Morton

== P ==
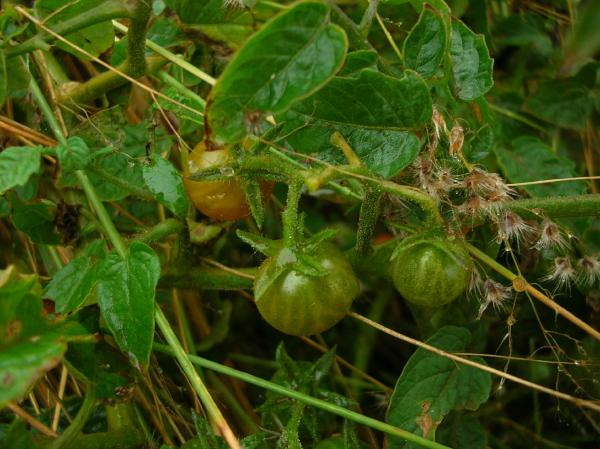
Solanum pimpinellifolium

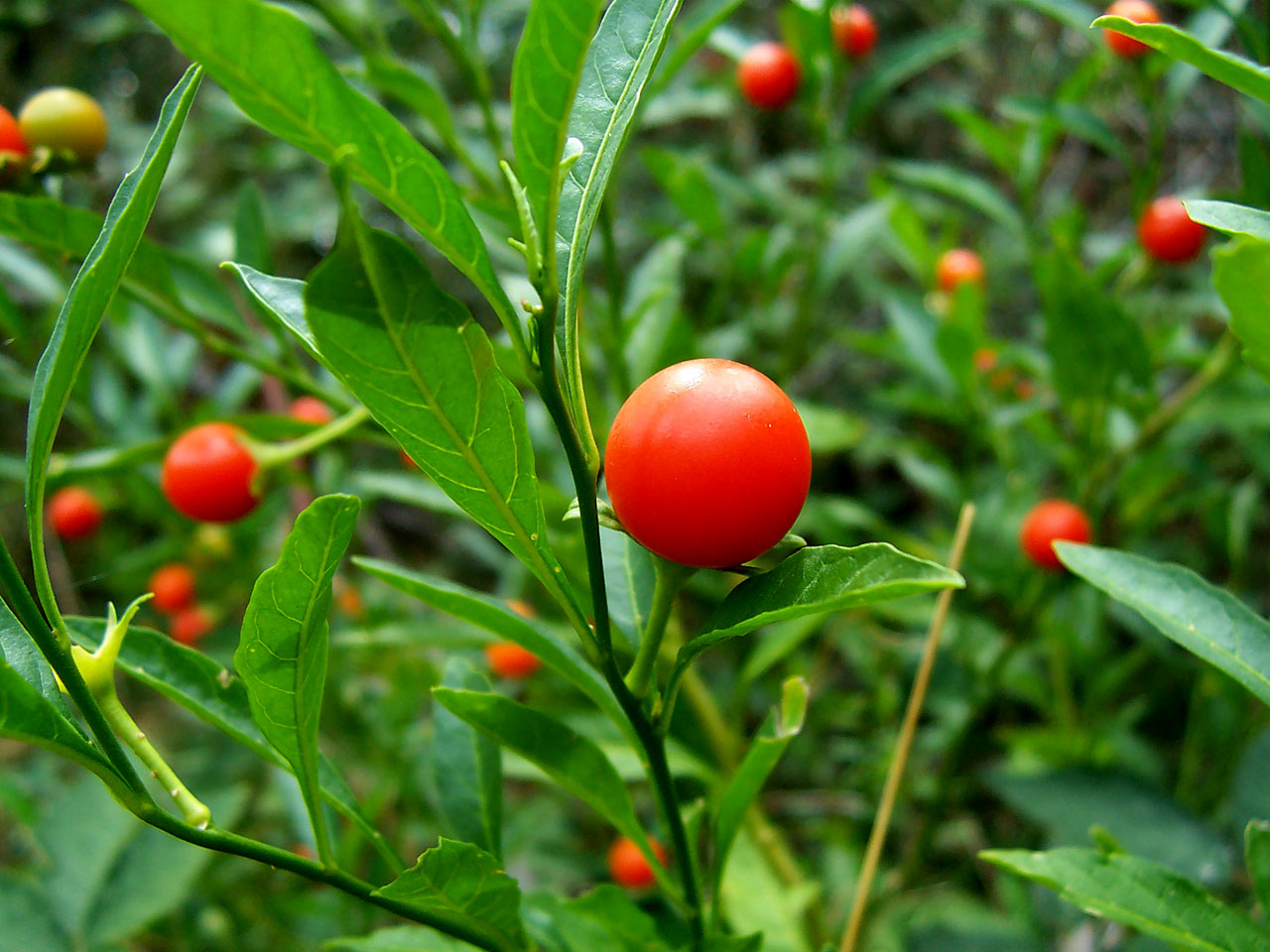
Solanum pseudocapsicum

- Solanum pabstii L.B.Sm. & Downs
- Solanum pachimatium Dunal
- Solanum pachyandrum Bitter
- Solanum pachyneuroides Amshoff
- Solanum pachyneurum O.E.Schulz
- Solanum pacificum Tepe
- Solanum palinacanthum Dunal .
- Solanum palitans C.V.Morton
- Solanum pallidifolium A.R.Bean
- Solanum pallidum Rusby
- Solanum palmillae Standl.
- Solanum paludosum Moric.
- Solanum palustre Schltdl.
- Solanum pampaninii Chiov.
- Solanum pancheri Guillaumin
- Solanum paniculatum L.
- Solanum papaverifolium Symon
- Solanum paposanum Phil.
- Solanum papuanum Symon
- Solanum paraibanum Agra
- Solanum paralum Bohs
- Solanum paranense Dusén
- Solanum parvifolium R.Br.
- Solanum pastillum S.Knapp
- Solanum paucidens Bitter
- Solanum paucispinum Werderm.
- Solanum paucissectum Ochoa
- Solanum pectinatum Dunal
- Solanum pedemontanum M.Nee
- Solanum pedersenii Cabrera
- Solanum peekelii Bitter
- Solanum peikuoense S.S.Ying
- Solanum pelagicum Bohs
- Solanum pendulum Ruiz & Pav.
- Solanum pennellii Correll
- Solanum pentaphyllum Bitter
- Solanum pentlandii Dunal
- Solanum pereirae Carvalho
- Solanum perlongistylum G.J.Anderson, Martine, Prohens & Nuez
- Solanum perplexum Small
- Solanum pertenue Standl. & C.V.Morton
- Solanum peruvianum L. – Peruvian nightshade, "wild tomato"
- Solanum petilum A.R.Bean
- Solanum petraeum Symon
- Solanum petrophilum Mueller
- Solanum phaseoloides Pol.
- Solanum phlomoides A.Cunn. ex Benth.
- Solanum phoberum A.R.Bean
- Solanum phoxocarpum Voronts.
- Solanum physalidicalyx Bitter
- Solanum physalifolium Rusby (Solanum sarrachoides auct.) – hairy nightshade
- Solanum piceum A.R.Bean
- Solanum pilcomayense Morong
- Solanum pillahuatense Vargas
- Solanum piluliferum Dunal
- Solanum pimpinellifolium L. – currant tomato
- Solanum pinetorum (L.B.Sm. & Downs) Bohs .
- Solanum pinnatisectum Dunal – tansy-leaved nightshade
- Solanum pinnatum Cav.
- Solanum pisinnum A.R.Bean
- Solanum pittosporifolium Hemsl.
- Solanum piurae Bitter
- Solanum placitum C.V.Morton
- Solanum plastisexum Martine & McDonnell
- Solanum platacanthum Dunal
- Solanum platense Diekm.
- Solanum platycypellon S.Knapp .
- Solanum plicatile (S.Moore) Symon
- Solanum plowmanii S.Knapp
- Solanum plumense Fernald
- Solanum pluriflorum A.R.Bean
- Solanum pluviale Standl.
- Solanum poinsettiifolium Rusby
- Solanum poka Dunal
- Solanum polhillii Voronts.
- Solanum polyacanthon Lam.
- Solanum polyacanthos Lam.
- Solanum polyadenium Greenm.
- Solanum polygamum Vahl – cakalaka berry
- Solanum polyphyllum Phil.
- Solanum polytrichostylum Bitter
- Solanum polytrichum Moric.
- Solanum praetermissum Kerr ex Barnett
- Solanum premnifolium (Miers) Bohs
- Solanum prinophyllum Dunal
- Solanum procumbens Lour.
- Solanum prolatum A.R.Bean
- Solanum proteanthum Bohs
- Solanum pruinosum Dunal
- Solanum pseuderanthemoides Schltr.
- Solanum pseudoamericanum Särkinen, P. Gonzáles & S. Knapp, 2013
- Solanum pseudoauriculatum Chodat & Hassl.
- Solanum pseudocapsicum L. – Jerusalem cherry, Madeira winter cherry, "winter cherry" (including S. capsicastrum)
- Solanum pseudodaphnopsis L.A. Mentz & Stehmann
- Solanum pseudogracile Heiser – Glowing nightshade
- Solanum pseudolulo Heiser
- Solanum pseudopedunculatum D.H.R.McClell.
- Solanum pseudoquina St.-Hil. (including S. inaequale Vell.)
- Solanum pseudosaponaceum Blume
- Solanum pseudospinosum C.H.Wright
- Solanum pseudosycophanta Farruggia
- Solanum psilophyllum Stehmann & Giacomin, 2015
- Solanum psychotrioides Dunal
- Solanum pubescens Willd.
- Solanum pubigerum Dunal
- Solanum pugiunculiferum C.T.White
- Solanum pulverulentifolium K.E. Roe.
- Solanum pumilum Dunal
- Solanum punctulatum Dunal
- Solanum pungetium R.Br.
- Solanum pusillum A.R.Bean
- Solanum putii Kerr ex Barnett
- Solanum pycnanthemum Mart.
- Solanum pycnotrichum A.R.Bean
- Solanum pygmaeum Cav.
- Solanum pyracanthos Lam.
- Solanum pyrifolium Lam.

== Q ==
- Solanum quadriloculatum Mueller
- Solanum quaesitum C.V.Morton ex Gleason & A.C.Sm.
- Solanum quebradense S.Knapp
- Solanum quitoense Lam.

== R ==
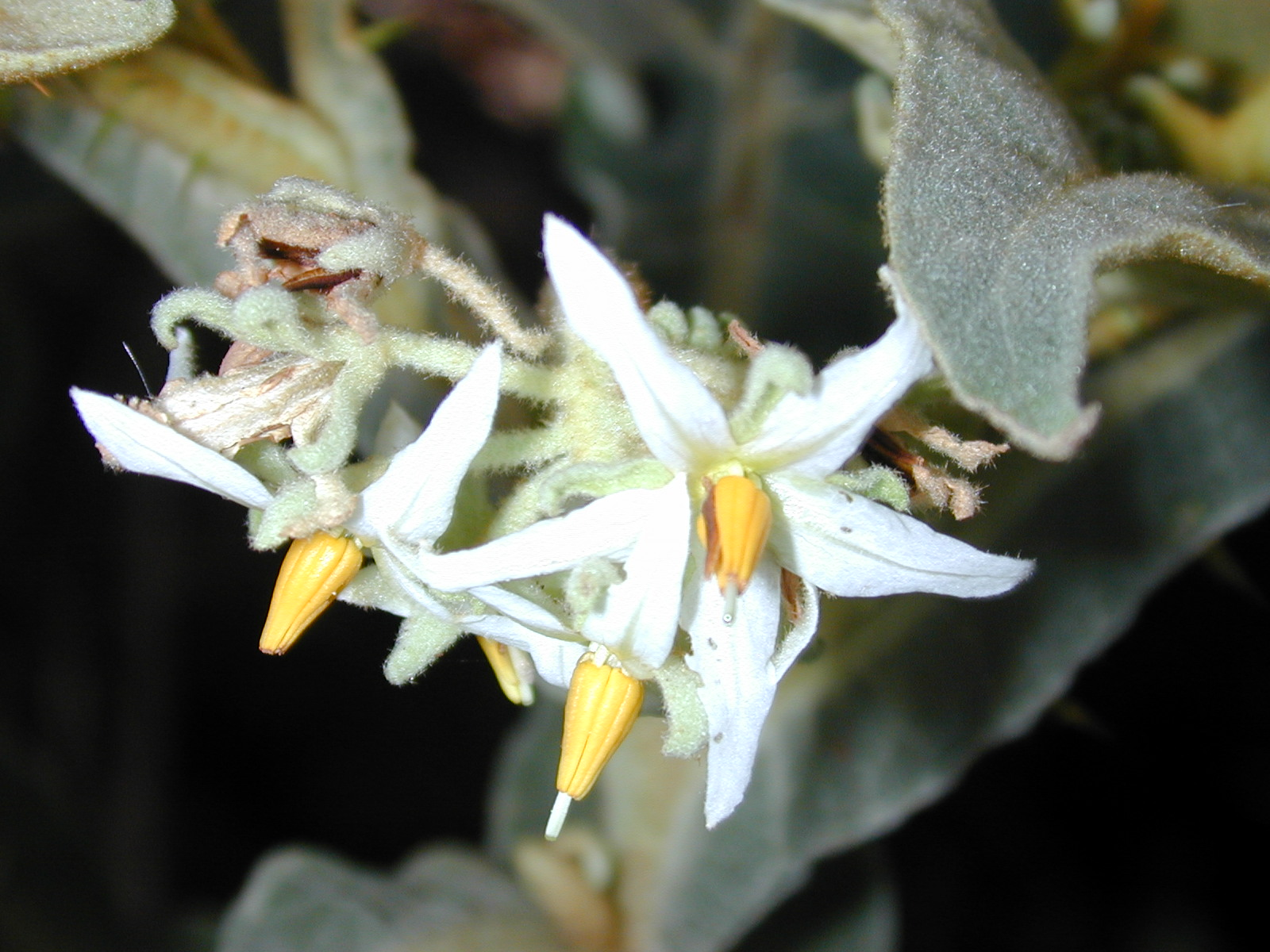
Solanum robustum

- Solanum radicans L.f.
- Solanum ramonense C.V.Morton & Standl.
- Solanum ramulosum Sendtn.
- Solanum raphanifolium Cárdenas & Hawkes
- Solanum raquialatum Ochoa
- Solanum ratale D.H.R.McClell.
- Solanum reclusum A.R.Bean
- Solanum reductum C.V.Morton
- Solanum reflexiflorum Moric. ex Dunal
- Solanum refractifolium Sendtn.
- Solanum refractum Hook. & Arn.
- Solanum reineckii Briq.
- Solanum reitzii L.B.Sm. & Downs
- Solanum remyanum Phil.
- Solanum repandum G.Forst.
- Solanum reptans Bunbury
- Solanum restingae S.Knapp
- Solanum retroflexum Dunal – wonderberry, sunberry
- Solanum retrorsum Elmer
- Solanum rhaphiotes A.R.Bean
- Solanum rhizomatum Särkinen & M. Nee, 2015
- T Solanum rhomboideilanceolatum Ochoa.
- Solanum rhytidoandrum Sendtn.
- Solanum richardii Dunal
- Solanum rigidum Lam. .
- Solanum riojense Bitter
- Solanum riparium Pers.
- Solanum ripense Dunal
- Solanum rivicola Symon
- Solanum rixosum A.R.Bean
- Solanum robinsonii Bonati
- Solanum roblense Bitter
- Solanum robustifrons Bitter
- Solanum robustum H.L.Wendl.
- Solanum rojasianum (Standl. & Steyerm.) Bohs
- Solanum roseum Bohs
- Solanum rostratum Dunal
- Solanum rovirosanum Donn. Sm.
- Solanum rubetorum Dunal
- Solanum rubicaule S.R. Stern, 2010
- Solanum rubiginosum Vahl
- Solanum rudepannum Dunal
- Solanum rufescens Sendtn.
- Solanum rufistellatum Steyerm.
- Solanum rugosum Dunal – tabacon aspero
- Solanum ruizii S.Knapp
- Solanum runsoriense C.H.Wright
- Solanum rupincola Sendtn.
- Solanum ruvu Voronts.

== S ==
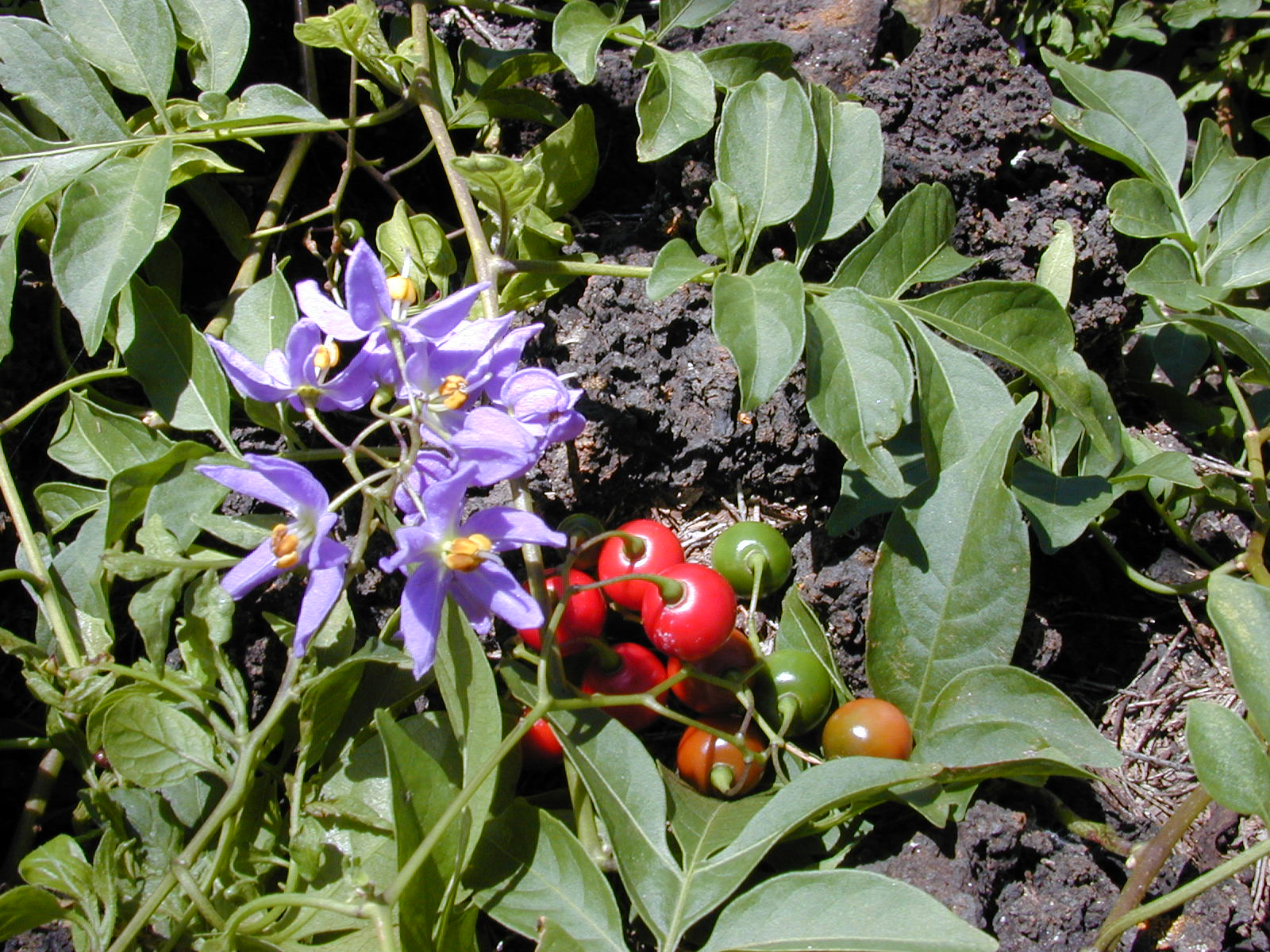
Solanum seaforthianum

- Solanum sagittantherum Granados-Tochoy & C.I. Orozco
- Solanum salamancae Hunz. & Barboza
- Solanum salasianum Ochoa
- Solanum salicifolium Phil.
- Solanum sambiranense D'Arcy & Rakot.
- Solanum sambuciflorum Sendtn.
- Solanum sambucinum Rydb.
- Solanum sanchez-vegae S.Knapp
- Solanum sanctae-catharinae Dunal
- Solanum sanctae-marthae Bitter
- Solanum sandwicense Hook. & Arn. – Hawaii horsenettle
- Solanum sanfurgoi Phil.
- Solanum santosii S.Knapp
- Solanum saponaceum Dunal
- Solanum sarrachoides Sendtn.
- Solanum saruwagedensis Symon
- Solanum saturatum M.Nee
- Solanum savanillense Bitter
- Solanum savannarum Rib.-Silva & Proença
- Solanum scabrifolium Ochoa
- Solanum scabrum Mill. – garden huckleberry
- Solanum scalarium Martine & T.M.Williams – Garrarnawun bush tomato
- Solanum schefferi Mueller
- Solanum schenckii Bitter
- Solanum schimperianum Hochst. ex A.Rich.
- Solanum schizandrum Sendtn.
- Solanum schlechtendalianum Walp.
- Solanum schliebenii Werderm.
- Solanum schomburgkii Sendtn.
- Solanum schuechii Sendtn.
- Solanum schulzianum Urb.
- Solanum schumannianum Dammer
- Solanum schwackeanum L.B.Sm. & Downs
- Solanum sciadostylis (Sendtn.) Bohs
- Solanum scolophyllum A.R.Bean
- Solanum scuticum M.Nee
- Solanum seaforthianum Andrews – Brazilian nightshade
- Solanum sejunctum Kym Brennan, Christopher T. Martine, & David E. Symon – Australian eggplant
- Solanum selachophyllum Bitter
- Solanum selleanum Urb. & Ekman
- Solanum sellowianum Sendtn.
- Solanum sellowii Dunal
- Solanum semiarmatum Mueller
- Solanum semisucculentum D.H.R.McClell.
- Solanum semotum M.Nee
- Solanum sendtnerianum Van Heurck & Müll.Arg.
- Solanum senticosum A.R.Bean
- Solanum septemlobum Bunge
- Solanum serpens A.R.Bean
- Solanum sessilantherum Gouvêa & Stehmann
- Solanum sessile Ruiz & Pav.
- Solanum sessiliflorum Dunal in Poir
- Solanum setaceum Dammer
- Solanum setigeroides (Whalen) S.R.Stern
- Solanum setosissimum Mentz & M.Nee
- Solanum shirleyanum Domin
- Solanum sibundoyense (Bohs) Bohs
- Solanum sieberi Van Heurck & Müll.Arg.
- Solanum silvestre A.R.Bean
- Solanum simile Mueller
- Solanum simplicissimum Ochoa
- Solanum sinuatiexcisum Bitter
- Solanum sinuatirecurvum Bitter
- Solanum sinuatorepandum K.Braun
- Solanum siphonobasis Bitter
- Solanum sisymbriifolium Lam. .
- Solanum sitiens I.M.Johnst.
- Solanum skutchii Correll
- Solanum smithii S.Knapp
- Solanum sodiroi Bitter (including S. carchiense)
- Solanum sodomaeodes Kuntze
- Solanum sogarandinum Ochoa
- Solanum solum J.F.Macbr.
- Solanum somalense Franch.
- Solanum sooretamum Carvalho
- Solanum sotobosquense Bohs
- Solanum sousae S.Knapp
- Solanum spirale Roxb.
- Solanum spissifolium Sendtn.
- Solanum splendens (Dunal) Bohs, 2015
- Solanum sporadotrichum Mueller
- Solanum stagnale Moric.
- Solanum stellatiglandulosum Bitter
- Solanum stellativelutinum Bitter
- Solanum stelligerum Sm.
- Solanum stenandrum Sendtn.
- Solanum stenophyllidium Bitter
- Solanum stenophyllum Dunal
- Solanum stenopterum A.R.Bean
- Solanum steyermarkii Carvalho
- Solanum stipitatostellatum Dammer
- Solanum stipulaceum Roem. & Schult.
- Solanum stipulatum Vell.
- Solanum stipuloideum Rusby
- Solanum stoloniferum Schltdl. – tigna potato, Fendler's horsenettle
- Solanum storkii C.V.Morton & Standl.
- Solanum stramoniifolium Jacq.
- Solanum stuckertii Bitter
- Solanum stupefactum Symon
- Solanum sturtianum Mueller
- Solanum suaveolens Kunth & C.D.Bouché
- Solanum subinerme Jacq.
- Solanum sublentum Hiern
- Solanum subserratum Dunal
- Solanum subsylvestre L.B.Sm. & Downs
- Solanum subtusviolaceum Bitter
- Solanum subumbellatum Vell.
- Solanum subvelutinum Rydb.
- Solanum succosum A.R.Bean & Albr.
- Solanum sulawesi X.Aubriot & S.Knapp
- Solanum sulphureum A.R.Bean
- Solanum sumacaspi S.Knapp
- Solanum superbum S.Knapp
- Solanum supinum Dunal
- Solanum swartzianum Roem. & Schult.
- Solanum sycocarpum Mart. & Sendtn.
- Solanum sycophanta Dunal
- Solanum symmetricum Rusby
- Solanum symonii H.Eichler

== T ==
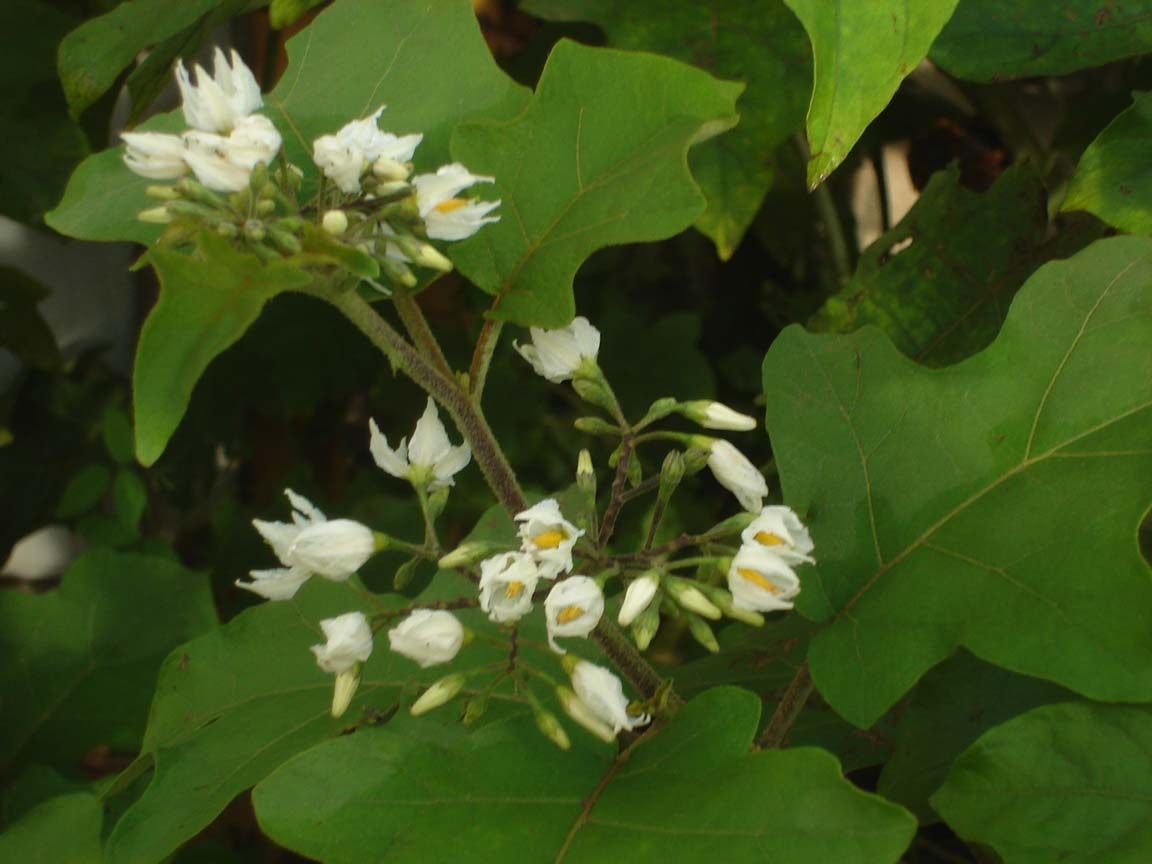
Inflorescence of Solanum torvum

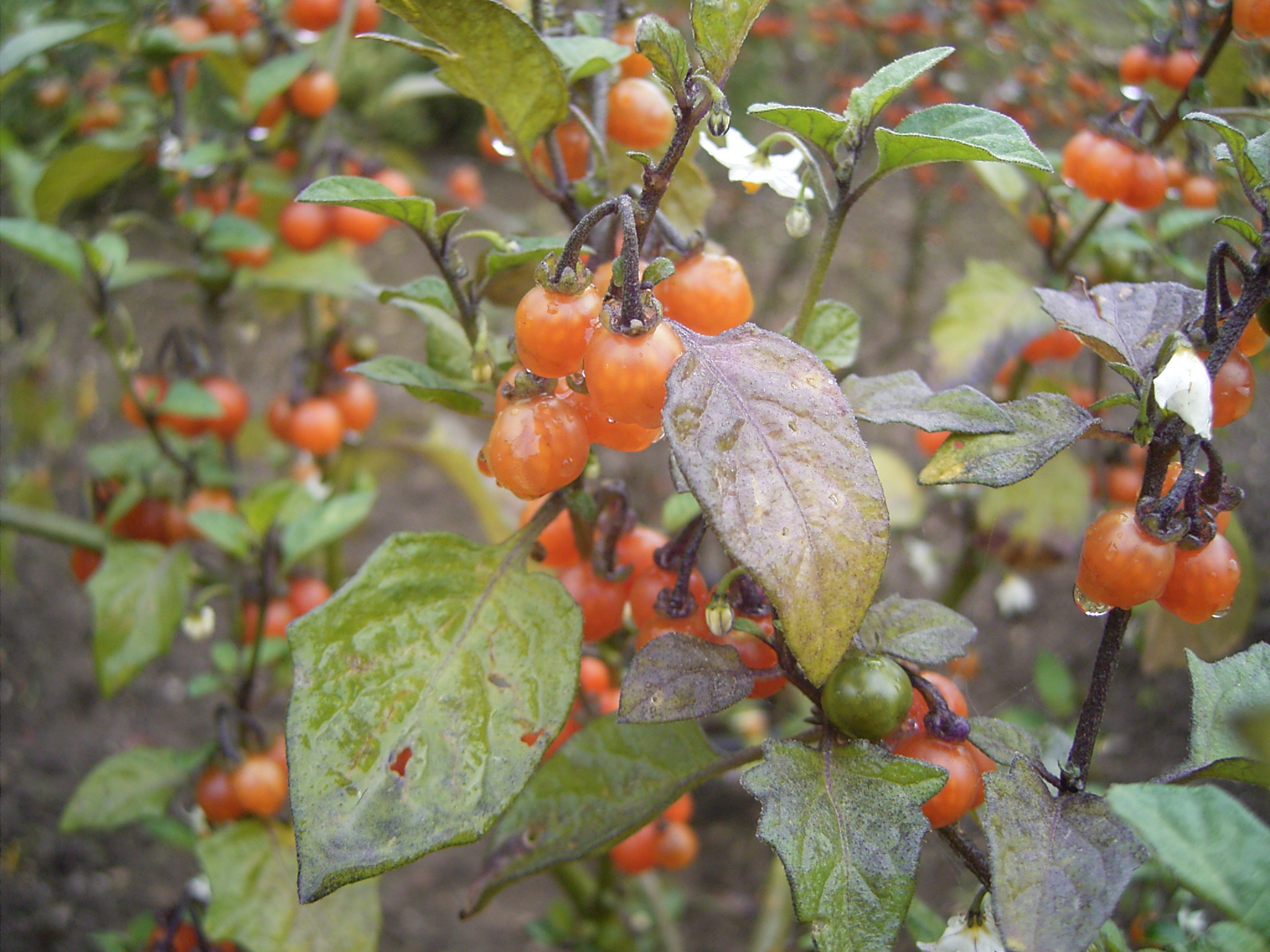
Fruit of Solanum triflorum

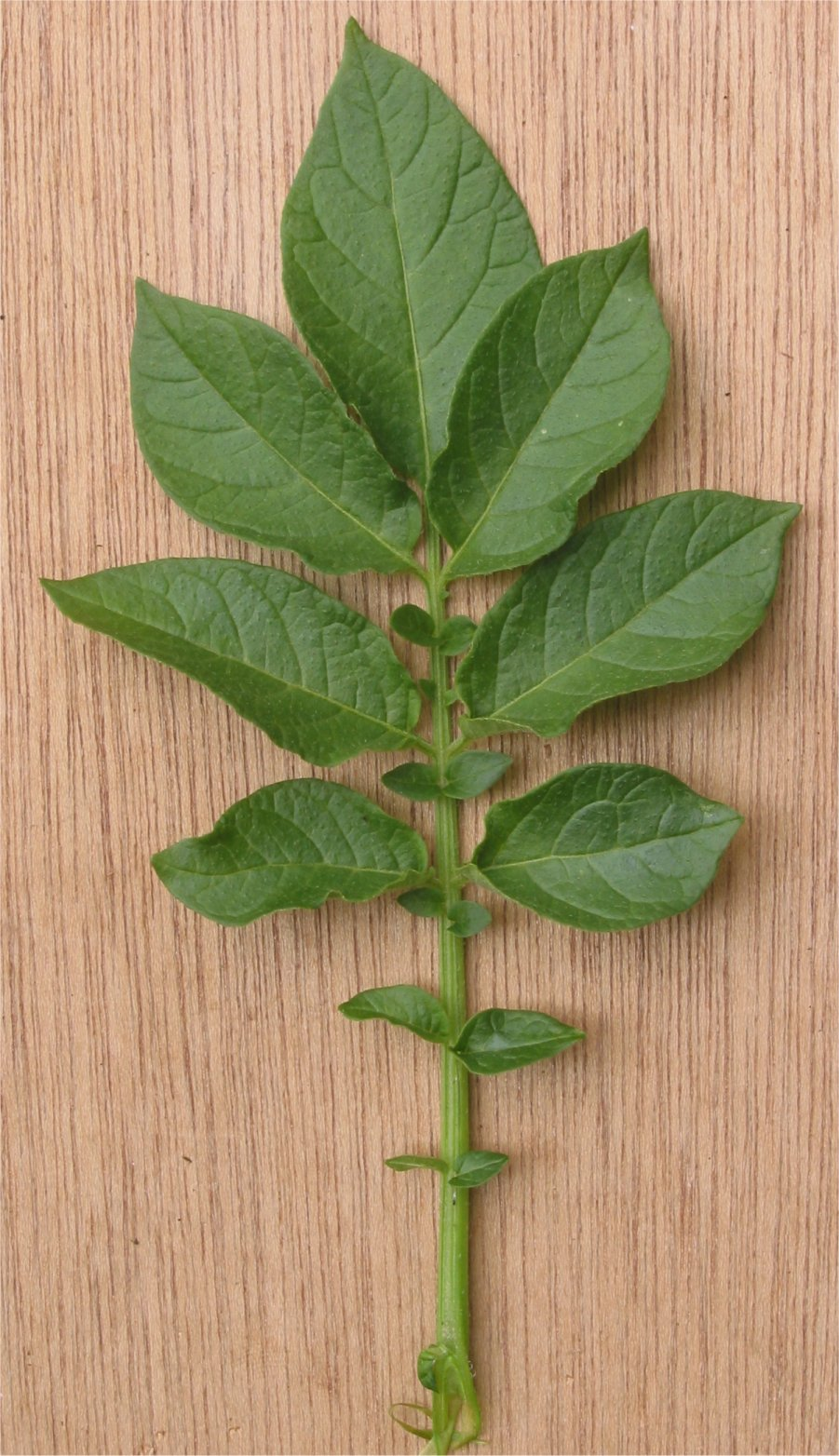
Compound leaf of Solanum tuberosum ("potato").

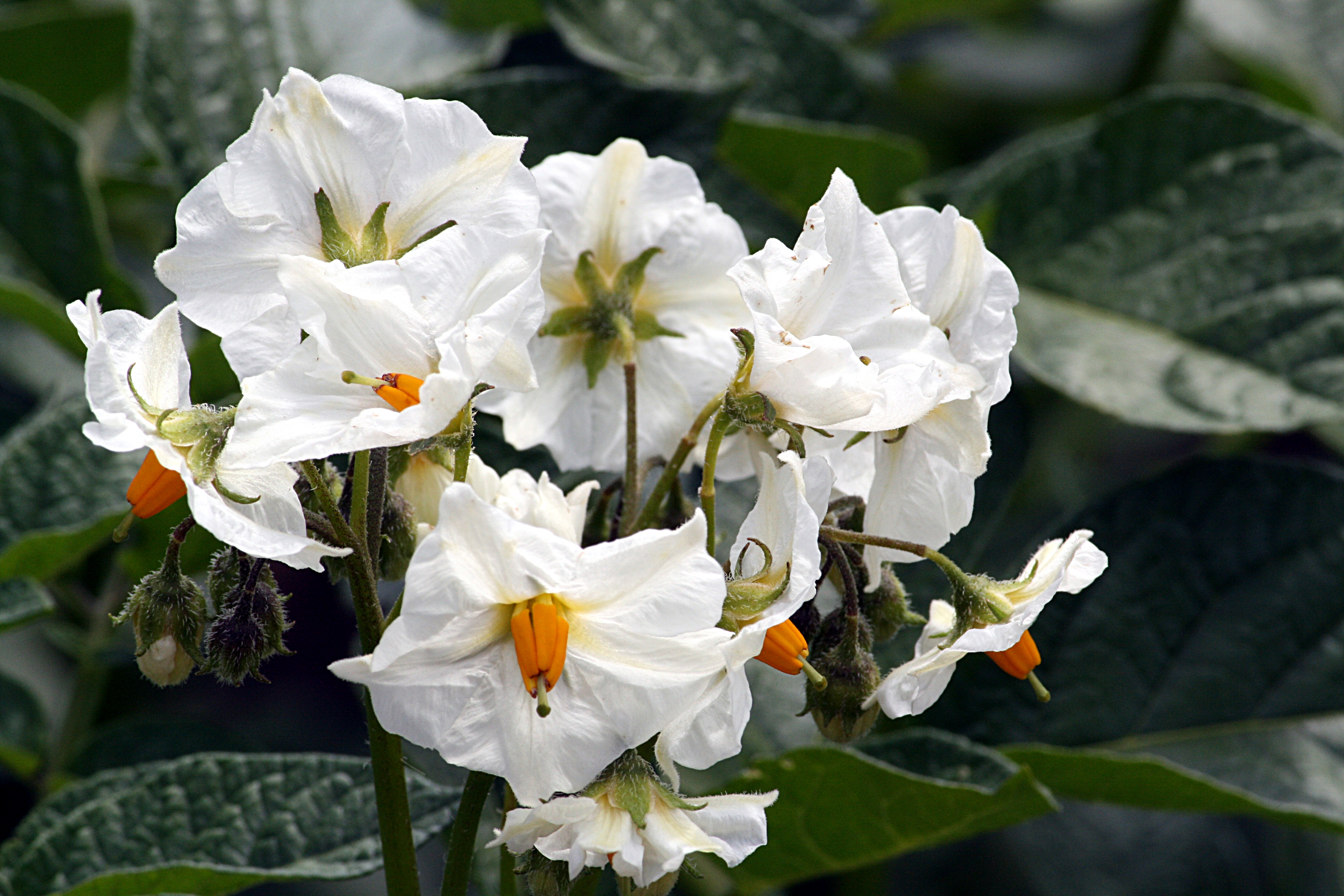
Inflorescence of Solanum tuberosum

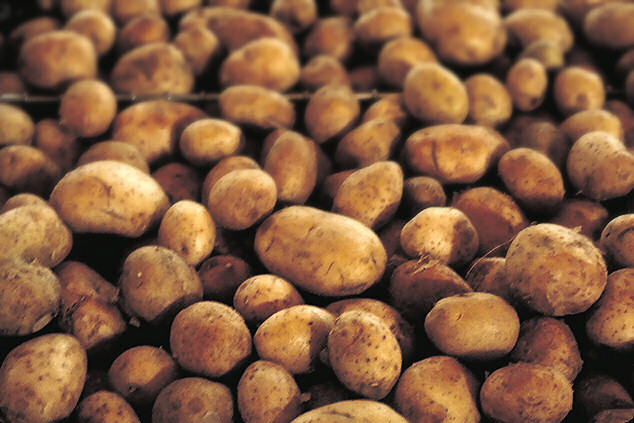
Tubers of Solanum tuberosum

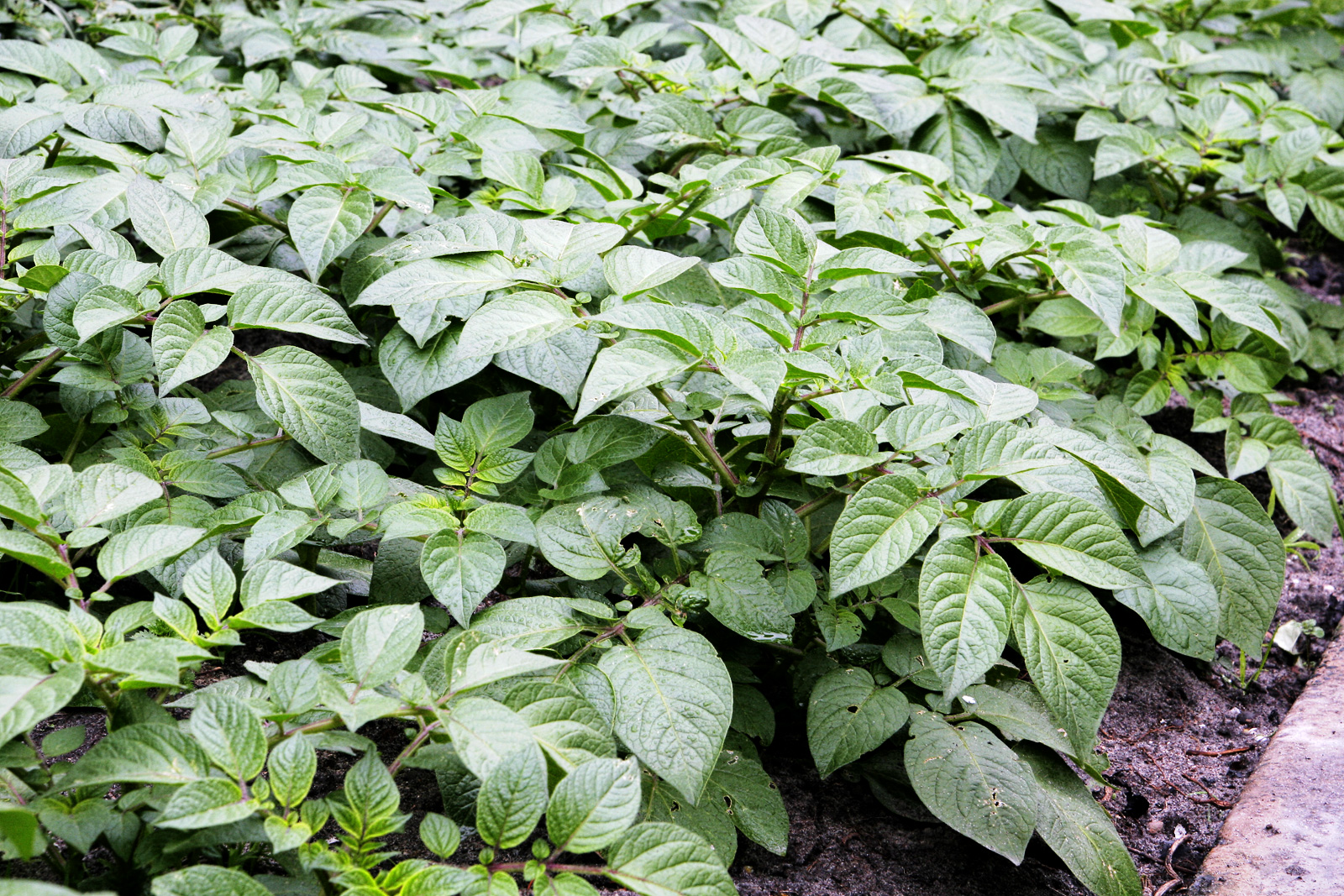
Cultivar of Solanum tuberosum

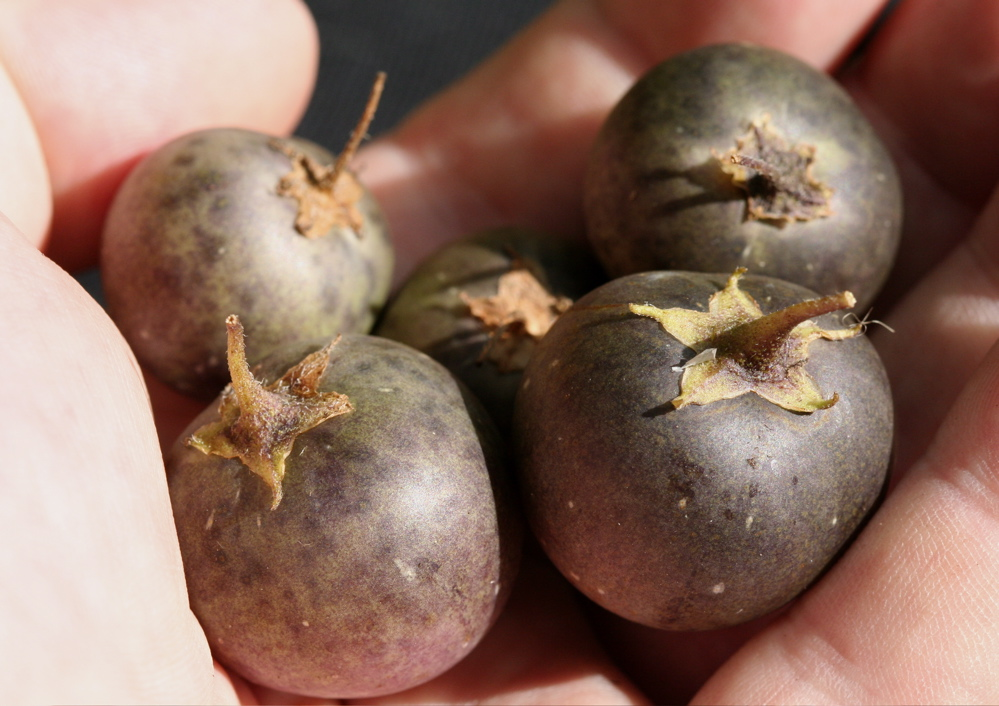
Fruit of Solanum tuberosum

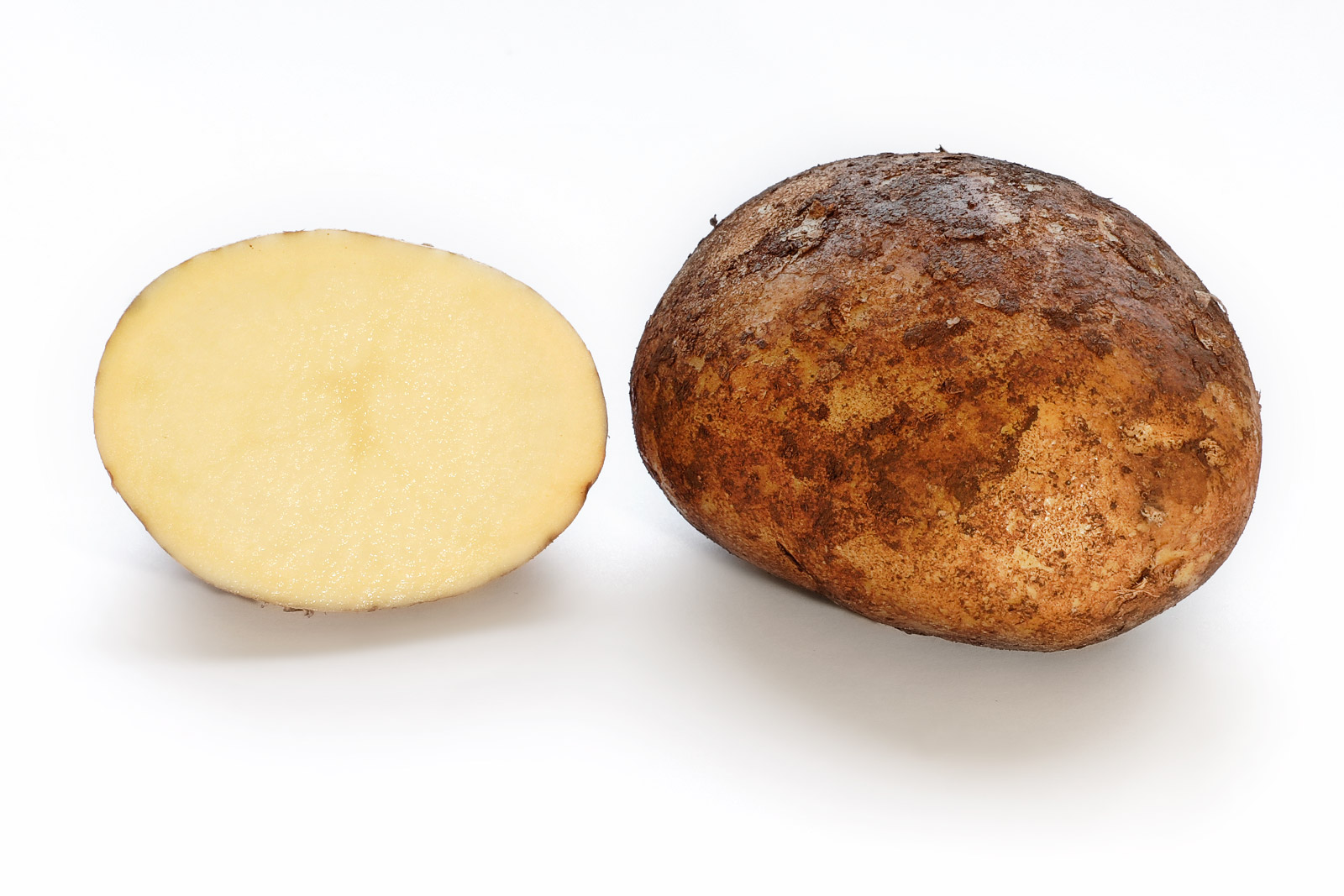
Solanum tuberosum - potato

- Solanum tabanoense Correll
- Solanum tacanense Lundell
- Solanum taeniotrichum Correll
- Solanum taitense Vatke
- Solanum talarense Svenson
- Solanum tampicense Dunal
- Solanum tanysepalum S.Knapp
- Solanum tarderemotum Bitter
- T Solanum tarnii Hawkes & Hjert.
- Solanum tectum Pers.
- Solanum tegore Aubl.
- Solanum tenuiflagellatum S.Knapp
- Solanum tenuihamatum Bitter
- Solanum tenuipes Bartlett – Fancy nightshade
- Solanum tenuisetosum (Bitter) Bohs
- Solanum tenuispinum Rusby
- Solanum tenuissimum Sendtn.
- Solanum tepuiense S.Knapp
- Solanum tergosericeum Ochoa
- Solanum terminale Forssk.
- Solanum ternatum Ruiz & Pav. (including S. ternifolium)
- Solanum terraneum Symon
- Solanum tetramerum Dunal
- Solanum tetrandrum R.Br.
- Solanum tetrathecum Mueller
- Solanum tetricum Dunal
- Solanum tettense Klotzsch
- Solanum thelopodium Sendtn.
- Solanum thomasiifolium Sendtn.
- Solanum tiinae Barboza & S.Knapp
- Solanum tobagense (Sandwith) Bohs
- Solanum toldense Mates. & Barboza
- Solanum toliaraea D'Arcy & Rakot.
- Solanum tomentosum L.
- Solanum torreanum A.E.Gonç.
- Solanum torricellense Bitter
- Solanum torvoideum Merrill & L.M.Perry
- Solanum torvum Sw. – turkey berry
- Solanum tovarii S.Knapp
- Solanum trachycarpum Bitter & Sodiro
- Solanum trachycyphum Bitter
- Solanum trachytrichium Bitter
- Solanum tribulosum Schauer
- Solanum trichopetiolatum D'Arcy & Rakot.
- Solanum trichostylum Merrill & L.M.Perry
- Solanum tricuspidatum Dunal
- T Solanum trifidum Correll
- Solanum triflorum Nutt. – cut-leaved nightshade
- Solanum trifolium Dunal
- Solanum trilobatum L.
- Solanum trinitense Ochoa
- Solanum trinominum J.R.Benn.
- Solanum tripartitum Dunal
- Solanum triplinervium C.V.Morton
- Solanum triquetrum Cav. – Texas nightshade
- Solanum trisectum Dunal
- Solanum triste Jacq. Enum.
- Solanum triunfense S. Knapp, 2015
- Solanum trizygum Bitter
- Solanum troyanum Urb.
- Solanum truncicola Bitter
- T Solanum tuberosum L. – potato
- Solanum tudununggae Symon
- Solanum tuerckheimii Greenm.
- Solanum tumulicola Symon
- Solanum tunariense Kuntze
- Solanum turgidum S.Knapp
- Solanum turneroides Chodat
- Solanum tweedianum Hook.

== U ==
- Solanum uleanum Bitter
- Solanum ultimum A.R.Bean
- Solanum ultraspinosum A.R.Bean
- Solanum umalilaense Manoko, 2012
- Solanum umbellatum Mill.
- Solanum umbelliferum Eschsch. – bluewitch nightshade
- Solanum umbratile J.R.Johnst.
- Solanum umtuma Voronts. & S.Knapp
- Solanum uncinellum Lindl.
- Solanum unifoliatum S.Knapp
- Solanum unilobum (Rusby) Bohs
- Solanum unispinum A.R.Bean
- Solanum urens Dunal
- Solanum ursinum Rusby
- Solanum urticans Dunal
- Solanum urubambaense Agra
- Solanum usambarense Bitter & Dammer
- Solanum usaramense Dammer

== V ==
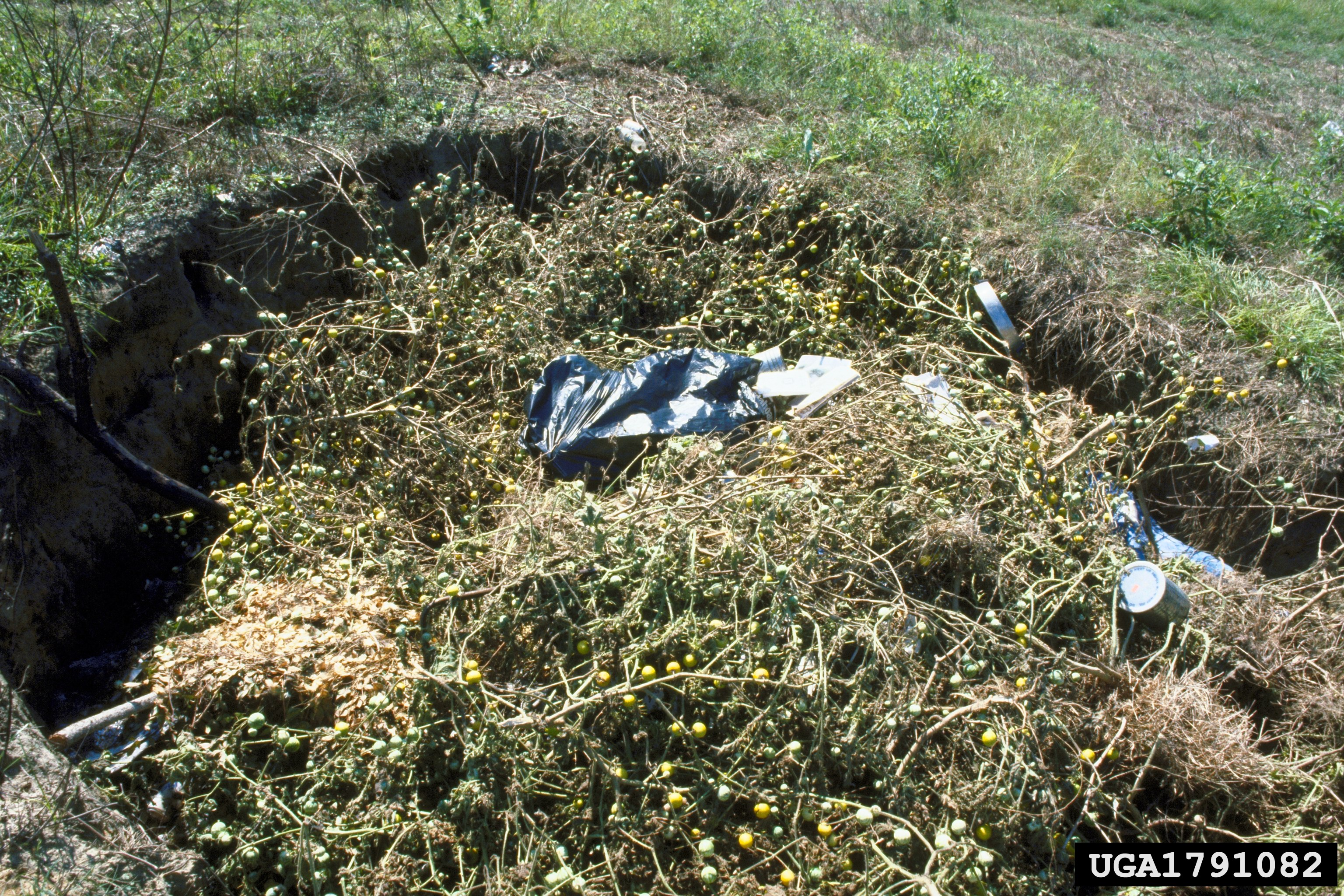
Solanum viarum

- Solanum vacciniiflorum Standl. & L.O.Williams
- Solanum vaccinioides Schltr.
- Solanum vagum Nees
- Solanum vaillantii Dunal
- Solanum valdiviense Dunal
- Solanum valerianum C.V.Morton & Standl.
- Solanum validinervium Benitez & S.Knapp
- Solanum vallis-mexici Juz. ex Bukasov
- Solanum vanheurckii Müll.Arg.
- Solanum vansittartense C.A.Gardner
- Solanum vanuatuense D.H.R.McClell.
- Solanum variabile Mart.
- Solanum velardei Ochoa
- Solanum velleum Thunb.
- Solanum vellozianum Dunal
- Solanum velutinum Dunal
- Solanum velutissimum Rusby
- Solanum venosum Dunal
- Solanum venturii Hawkes & Hjert.
- Solanum verecundum M.Nee
- T Solanum vernei Bitter & Wittm.
- T Solanum verrucosum Schltdl.
- Solanum versicolor A.R.Bean
- Solanum verticillatum S. Knapp & Stehmann, 2015
- Solanum vescum Mueller
- Solanum vespertilio Aiton
- Solanum vestissimum Dunal
- Solanum viarum Dunal
- Solanum vicinum A.R.Bean
- Solanum villosum Mill. – yellow nightshade
- Solanum violaceimarmoratum Bitter
- Solanum violaceum Ortega
- Solanum virginianum L.
- Solanum viride Spreng. – green nightshade
- Solanum viridifolium Dunal
- Solanum viscosissimum Sendtn.
- Solanum volubile Sw.

== W ==
- Solanum wackettii Witasek
- Solanum wallacei (A.Gray) Parish – Wallace's nightshade, Catalina nightshade, Clokey's nightshade, "wild tomato"
- Solanum warmingii Hiern
- Solanum watneyi Martine & Frawley – Australian bush tomato, named after fictional character Mark Watney from "The Martian" novel and film.
- Solanum weddellii Phil.
- Solanum wendlandii Hook.f.
- Solanum whalenii M.Nee
- Solanum wightii Nees
- Solanum wilkinsii S.Moore
- Solanum wittei Robyns
- Solanum wittmackii Bitter
- Solanum woodburyi Howard – Woodbury's nightshade
- Solanum woodii Särkinen & S. Knapp, 2016
- Solanum wrightii Benth.

== X ==
- Solanum xanthophaeum Bitter

== Y ==
- Solanum yanamonense S.Knapp
- Solanum youngii S.Knapp

== Z ==
- Solanum zanzibarense Vatke.
- Solanum zoeae R.L.Barrett
- Solanum zuloagae Cabrera
- Solanum zumbense Bohs

== Hybrid taxa (nothospecies) ==
- T Solanum × blanco-galdosii Ochoa.
- Solanum × procurrens A.C.Leslie
- Solanum × rechei Hawkes & Hjerting
- T Solanum × viirsooi K.A.Okada & A.M.Clausen
