= Potato vine =

Potato vine may apply to

- several plant species of the genus Solanum.
  - Solanum crispum, also called Chilean potato vine
  - Solanum laxum, (Solanum jasminoides) also called Jasmine nightshade
  - Solanum wendlandii, also called Giant potato vine or Divorce vine
- some Dioscorea species
