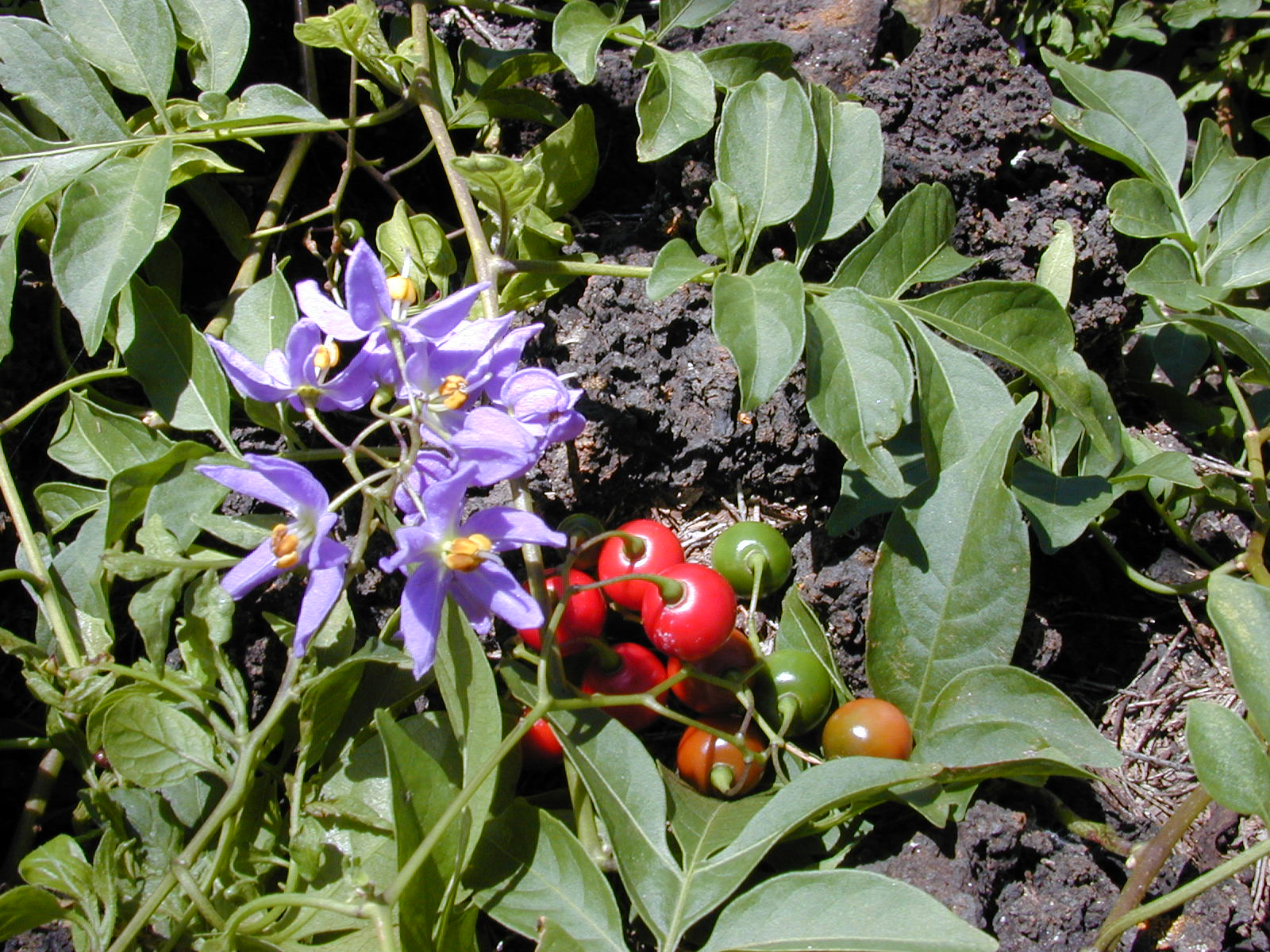
- Brazilian nightshade (Solanum seaforthianum)

Scientific classification
- Kingdom: Plantae
- Clade: Tracheophytes
- Clade: Angiosperms
- Clade: Eudicots
- Clade: Asterids
- Order: Solanales
- Family: Solanaceae
- Subfamily: Solanoideae
- Tribe: Solaneae
- Genus: Solanum; L.

Type species
- Solanum nigrum L.

Subgenera
- Bassovia; Leptostemonum; Lyciosolanum; Solanum (but see text)

Synonyms
- List: Amatula Medik.; Androcera Nutt.; Antimion Raf.; Aquartia Jacq.; Artorhiza Raf.; Bassovia Aubl.; Battata Hill; Bosleria A.Nelson; Ceranthera Raf.; Cliocarpus Miers; Codylis Raf.; Cyathostyles Schott ex Meisn.; Cyphomandra Mart. ex Sendtn.; Diamonon Raf.; Dimorphylia Cortés; Dulcamara Moench; Fontqueriella Rothm.; Lycomela Heist. ex Fabr.; Lycopersicon Mill.; Melongena Mill.; Normania Lowe; Nycterium Vent.; Pallavicinia De Not.; Parmentiera Raf.; Petagnia Raf.; Pheliandra Werderm.; Pionandra Miers; Pseudocapsicum Medik.; Psolanum Neck.; Scubulon Raf.; Solanastrum Heist. ex Fabr.; Solanocharis Bitter; Solanopsis Börner; Triguera Cav.

= Solanum =

Genus of flowering plants

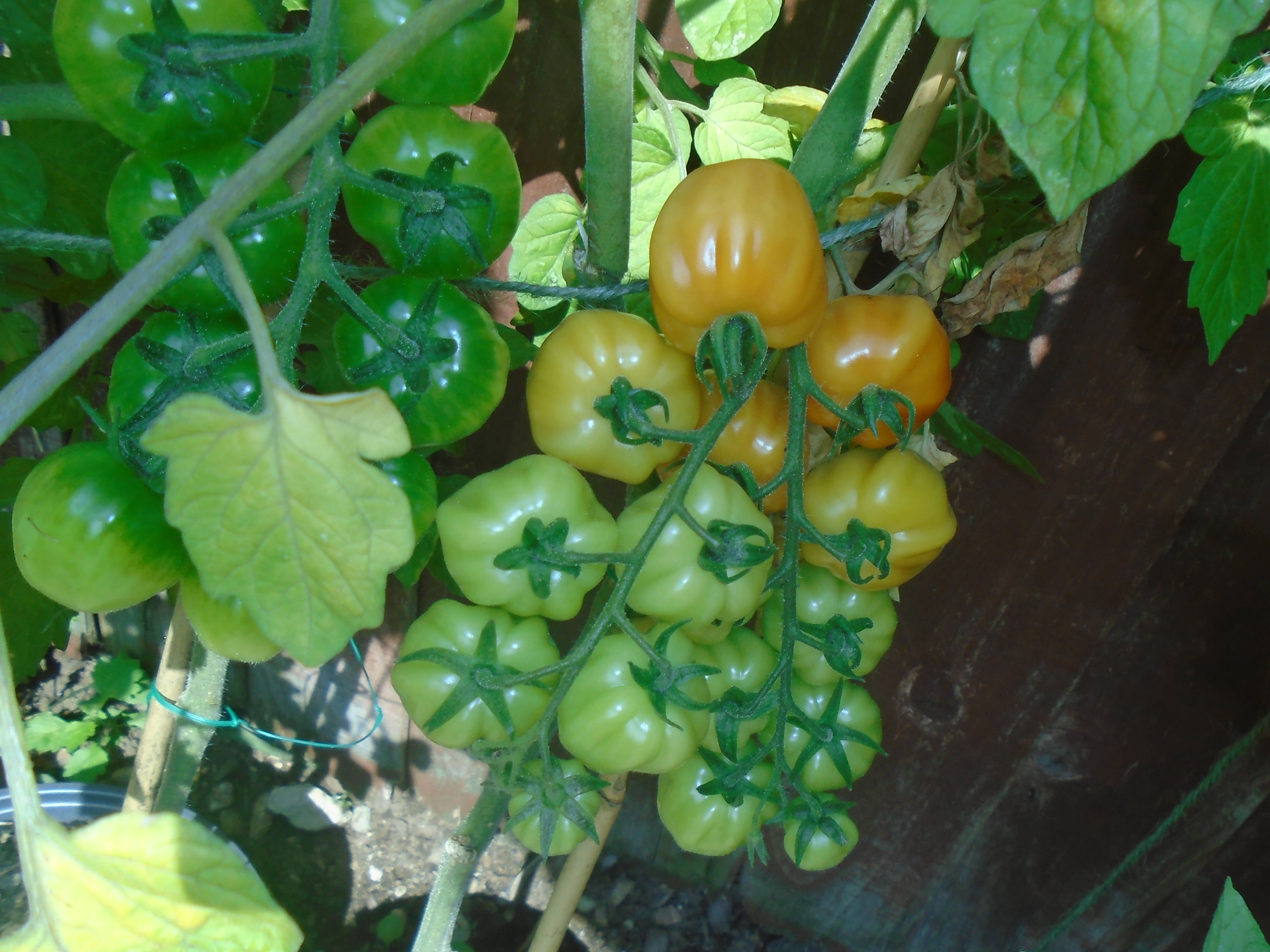
Unripe fruit of Solanum lycopersicum (tomato)

Solanum is a large and diverse genus of flowering plants, which include three food crops of high economic importance: the potato, the tomato and the eggplant (aubergine, brinjal). It is the largest genus in the nightshade family Solanaceae, comprising around 1,500 species. It also contains the so-called horse nettles (unrelated to the genus of true nettles, Urtica), as well as numerous plants cultivated for their ornamental flowers and fruit.

Solanum species show a wide range of growth habits, such as annuals and perennials, vines, subshrubs, shrubs, and small trees. Many formerly independent genera like Lycopersicon (the tomatoes) and Cyphomandra are now included in Solanum as subgenera or sections. Thus, the genus today contains roughly 1,500–2,000 species.

== Name ==
The generic name was first used by Pliny the Elder (AD 23–79) for a plant also known as strychnos, most likely S. nigrum. Its derivation is uncertain, possibly stemming from the Latin word sol, meaning "sun", referring to its status as a plant of the sun.

== Species having the common name "nightshade" ==
The species most commonly called nightshade in North America and Britain is Solanum dulcamara, also called bittersweet or woody nightshade (so-called because it is a scandent shrub). Its foliage and egg-shaped red berries are poisonous, the active principle being solanine, which can cause convulsions and death if taken in large doses. Black nightshades (many species in the Solanum nigrum complex, Solanum sect. Solanum) have varying levels of toxins and are considered too toxic to eat by many people in North America and Europe, but young stems and leaves or fully ripened fruit of various species are cooked and eaten by native people in North America, Africa, and Asia. Deadly nightshade (Atropa belladonna) belongs, like Solanum, to subfamily Solanoideae of the nightshade family, but, unlike that genus, is a member of tribe Hyoscyameae (Solanum belongs to tribe Solaneae). The chemistry of Atropa species is very different from that of Solanum species and features the very toxic tropane alkaloids, the best-known of which is atropine.

== Taxonomy ==
The genus was established by Carl Linnaeus in 1753. Its subdivision has always been problematic, but slowly some sort of consensus is being achieved.

The following list is a provisional lineup of the genus' traditional subdivisions, together with some notable species. Many of the subgenera and sections might not be valid; they are used here provisionally as the phylogeny of this genus is not fully resolved yet and many species have not been reevaluated.

Cladistic analyses of DNA sequence data suggest that the present subdivisions and rankings are largely invalid. Far more subgenera would seem to warrant recognition, with Leptostemonum being the only one that can at present be clearly subdivided into sections. Notably, it includes as a major lineage several members of the traditional sections Cyphomandropsis and the old genus Cyphomandra.

=== Subgenus Bassovia ===
==== Section Allophylla ====
- Solanum granuloso-leprosum

==== Section Cyphomandropsis ====
- Solanum glaucophyllum Desf. – Waxy-leaved nightshade

==== Section Pachyphylla ====
- Solanum betaceum Cav. – Tamarillo
- Solanum exiguum
- Solanum roseum

=== Subgenus Leptostemonum ===
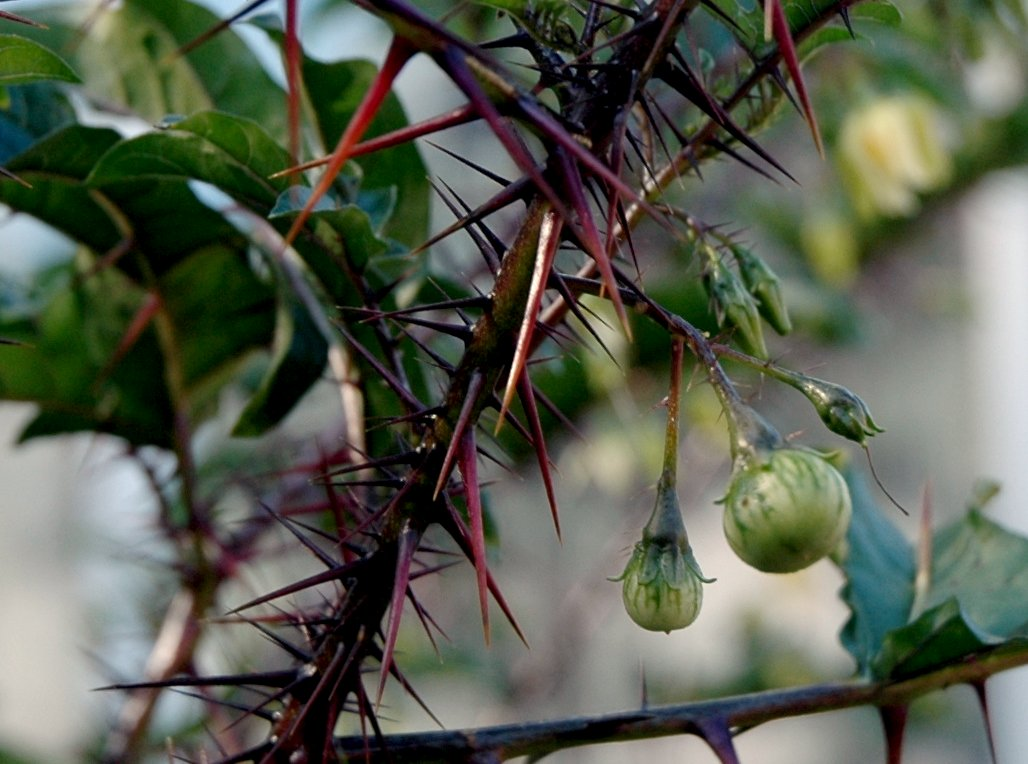
Five-minute plant (S. atropurpureum) fruit

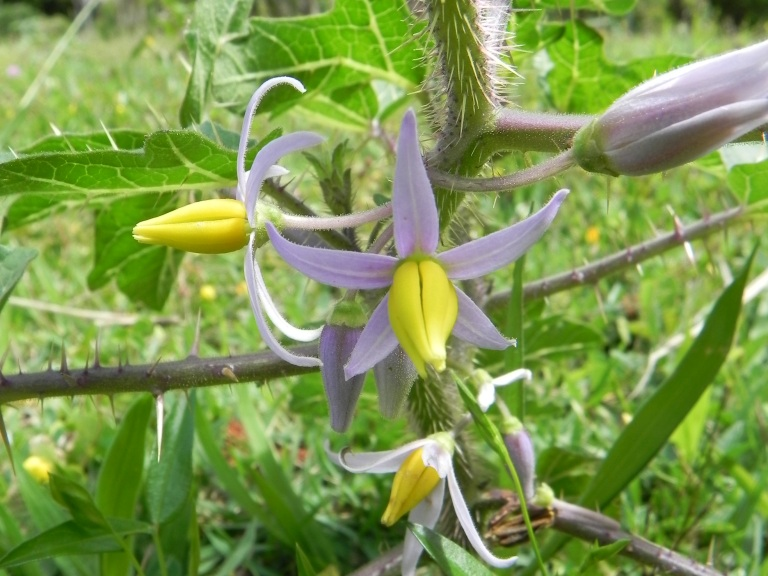
Solanum palinacanthum

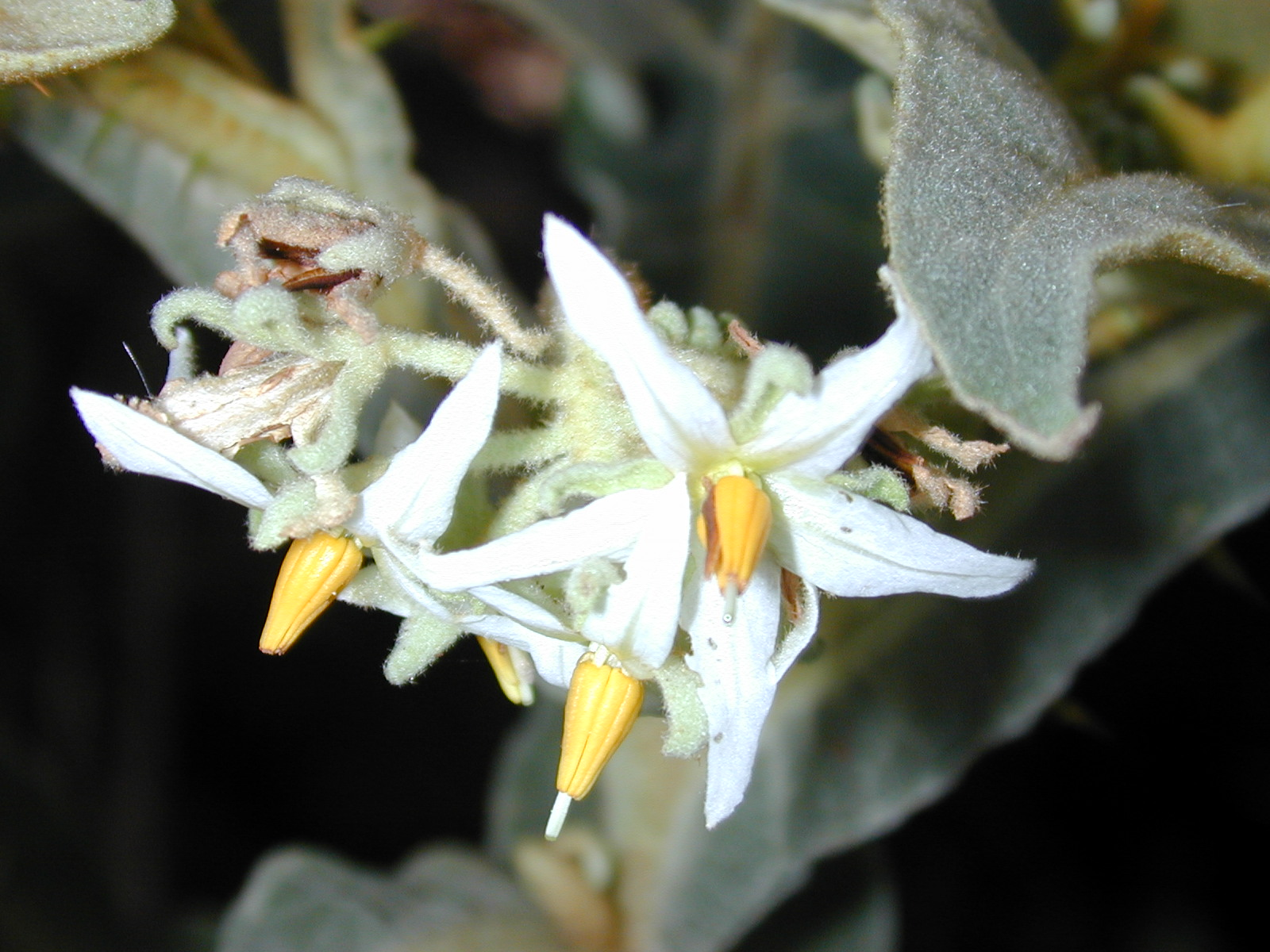
Shrubby nightshade (S. robustum) flowers

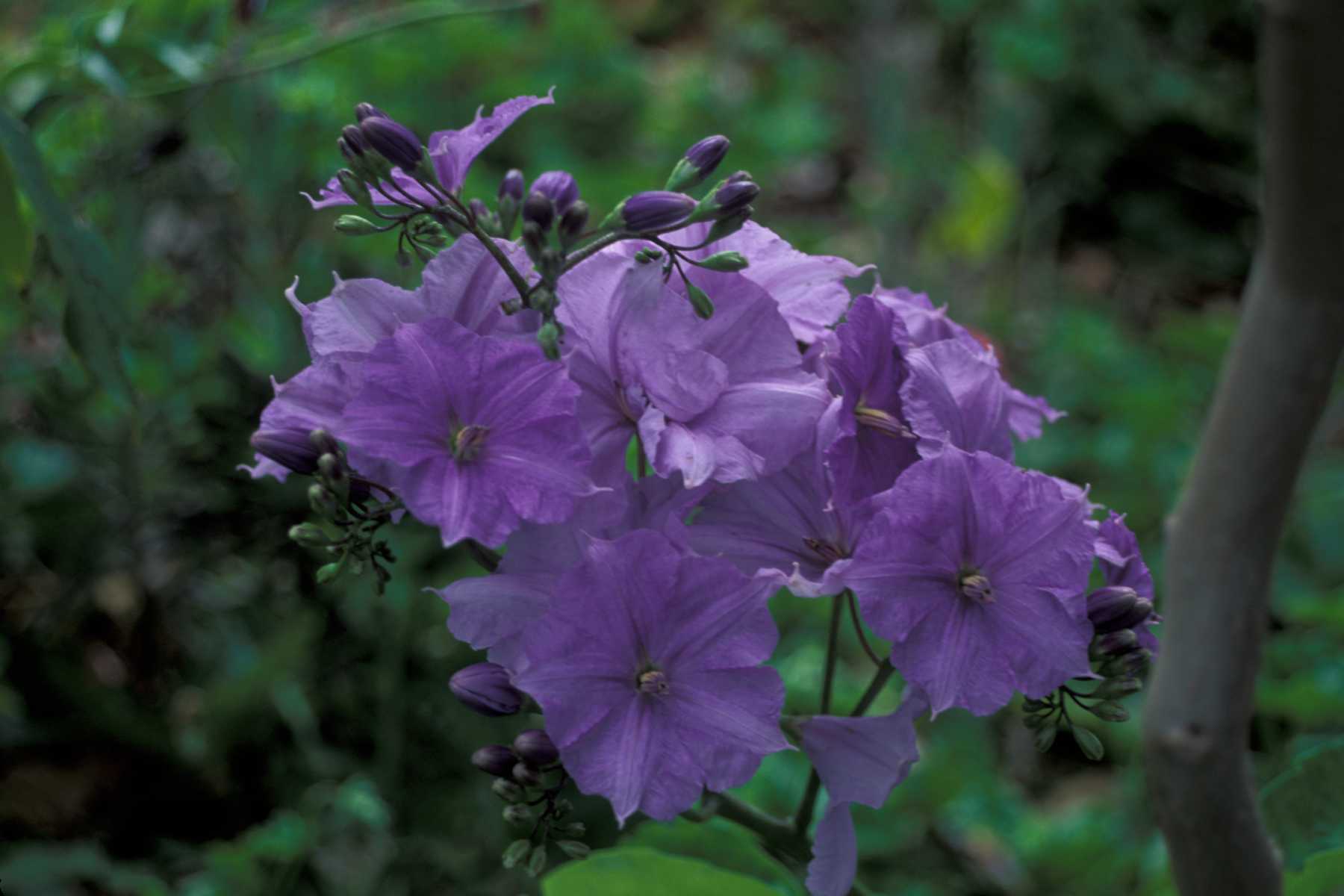
Giant potatocreeper (S. wendlandii) flowers

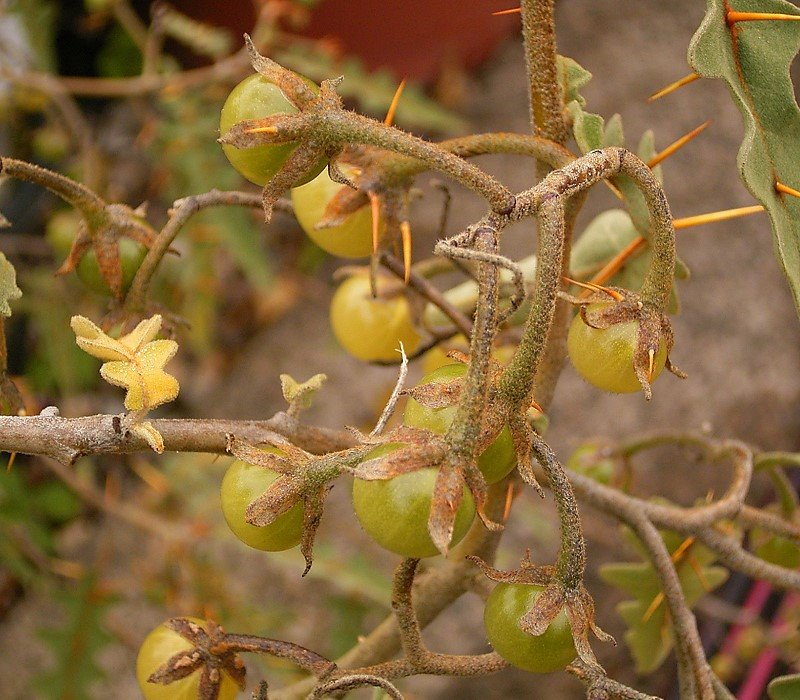
Porcupine tomato (S. pyracanthos) fruit

==== Section Acanthophora ====
- Solanum aculeatissimum Jacq. – Indian nightshade
- Solanum atropurpureum Schrank – Five-minute plant
- Solanum capsicoides – Cockroach berry, polohauaiʻi (Polynesian)
- Solanum mammosum – Nipplefruit, fox head, cow's udder, apple of Sodom
- Solanum palinacanthum Dunal
- Solanum viarum Dunal – Tropical soda apple

==== Section Androceras ====
12 spp.

- Series Androceras
- Series Violaceiflorum
- Series Pacificum

==== Section Erythrotrichum ====
- Solanum robustum H.L.Wendl. – Shrubby nightshade

==== Section Herposolanum ====
- Solanum wendlandii Hook.f. – Giant potatocreeper

==== Section Irenosolanum ====
- Solanum incompletum Dunal – Pōpolo kū mai (Hawaiʻi)
- Solanum nelsonii Dunal – Nelson's horsenettle, ʻĀkia (Hawaiʻi)
- Solanum sandwicense Hook. & Arn. – Hawaiian horsenettle, Pōpoloʻaiakeakua (Oʻahu, Kauaʻi)

==== Section Lasiocarpa ====
- Solanum lasiocarpum Dunal
- Solanum pseudolulo – lulo de perro (Colombia)
- Solanum quitoense – lulo (Colombia), naranjilla (Ecuador)
- Solanum sessiliflorum – Cocona

==== Section Melongena ====
- Solanum aculeastrum – Soda apple, sodaapple nightshade, goat apple, poison apple, "bitter-apple"
- Solanum campechiense – Redberry nightshade
- Solanum carolinense – Carolina horsenettle, radical weed, sand brier, devil's tomato, "bull nettle", "tread-softly", "apple of Sodom", "wild tomato" (southeastern United States)
- Solanum cataphractum (northern Western Australia, including Coronation Island)
- Solanum citrullifolium A.Braun – Watermelon nightshade (southern United States)
- Solanum dimidiatum Raf. – Torrey's nightshade
- Solanum elaeagnifolium – Silver-leaved nightshade, prairie berry, silverleaf nettle, white horsenettle, silver nightshade, "bull-nettle", "trompillo" (Spanish); Silver-leaf bitter-apple, satansbos (South Africa)
- Solanum heterodoxum Dunal – Melon-leaved nightshade
- Solanum incanum L.
- Solanum linnaeanum – Devil's apple, apple of Sodom
- Solanum macrocarpon L.
- Solanum marginatum L.f. – White-margined nightshade
- Solanum melongena – Eggplant, aubergine (including S. ovigerum)
- Solanum rostratum Dunal – Buffalo bur, Texas thistle
- Solanum sisymbriifolium Lam. – Sticky nightshade, fire-and-ice
- Solanum virginianum L.

==== Section Micracantha ====
- Solanum jamaicense Mill. – Jamaican nightshade
- Solanum lanceifolium Jacq. – Lance-leaved nightshade
- Solanum tampicense Dunal – Wetland nightshade

==== Section Oliganthes ====
- Solanum aethiopicum – Ethiopian eggplant, nakati, mock tomato, Ethiopian nightshade; including S. gilo (scarlet eggplant, Gilo or jiló)
- Solanum centrale – Australian desert raisin, bush raisin, bush sultana, "bush tomato", akatjurra (Alyawarre), kampurarpa (Pitjantjatjara), merne akatyerre (Arrernte), kutjera
- Solanum ellipticum – Potato bush, "bush tomato"
- Solanum pyracanthos Lam. – Porcupine tomato, Devil's Thorn
- Solanum quadriloculatum F.Muell. – "bush tomato", "wild tomato" (Australia)

==== Section Persicariae ====
- Solanum bahamense L. – Bahama nightshade, canker berry, berengena de playa
- Solanum ensifolium Dunal – Erubia

==== Section Torva ====
- Solanum asteropilodes
- Solanum chrysotrichum Schltdl. – Giant devil's-fig
- Solanum lanceolatum – Orangeberry nightshade
- Solanum paniculatum – Jurubeba
- Solanum torvum – Turkey berry, devil's fig, prickly nightshade, shoo-shoo bush, wild eggplant, pea eggplant

=== Subgenus Lyciosolanum ===
- Solanum guineense L.

=== Subgenus Solanum ===
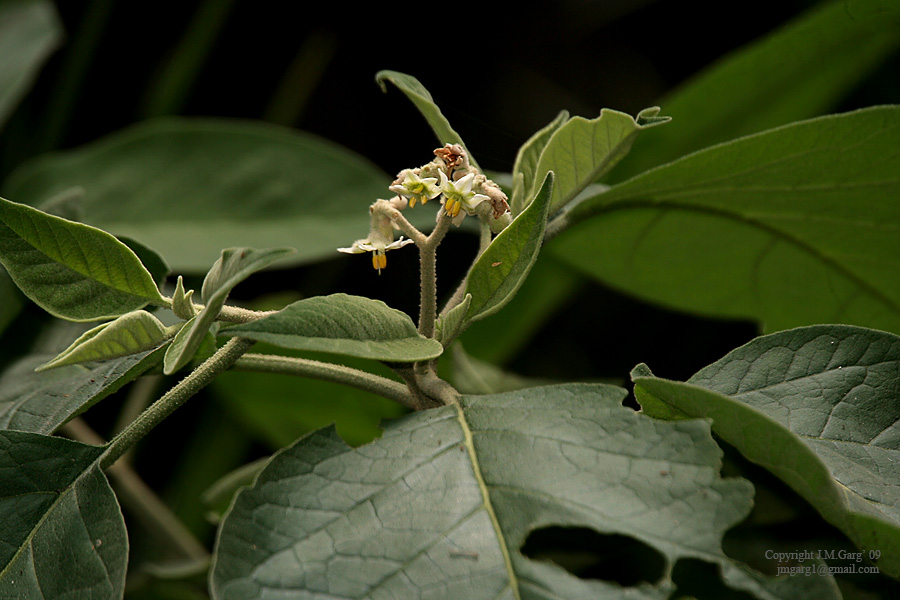
Solanum erianthum

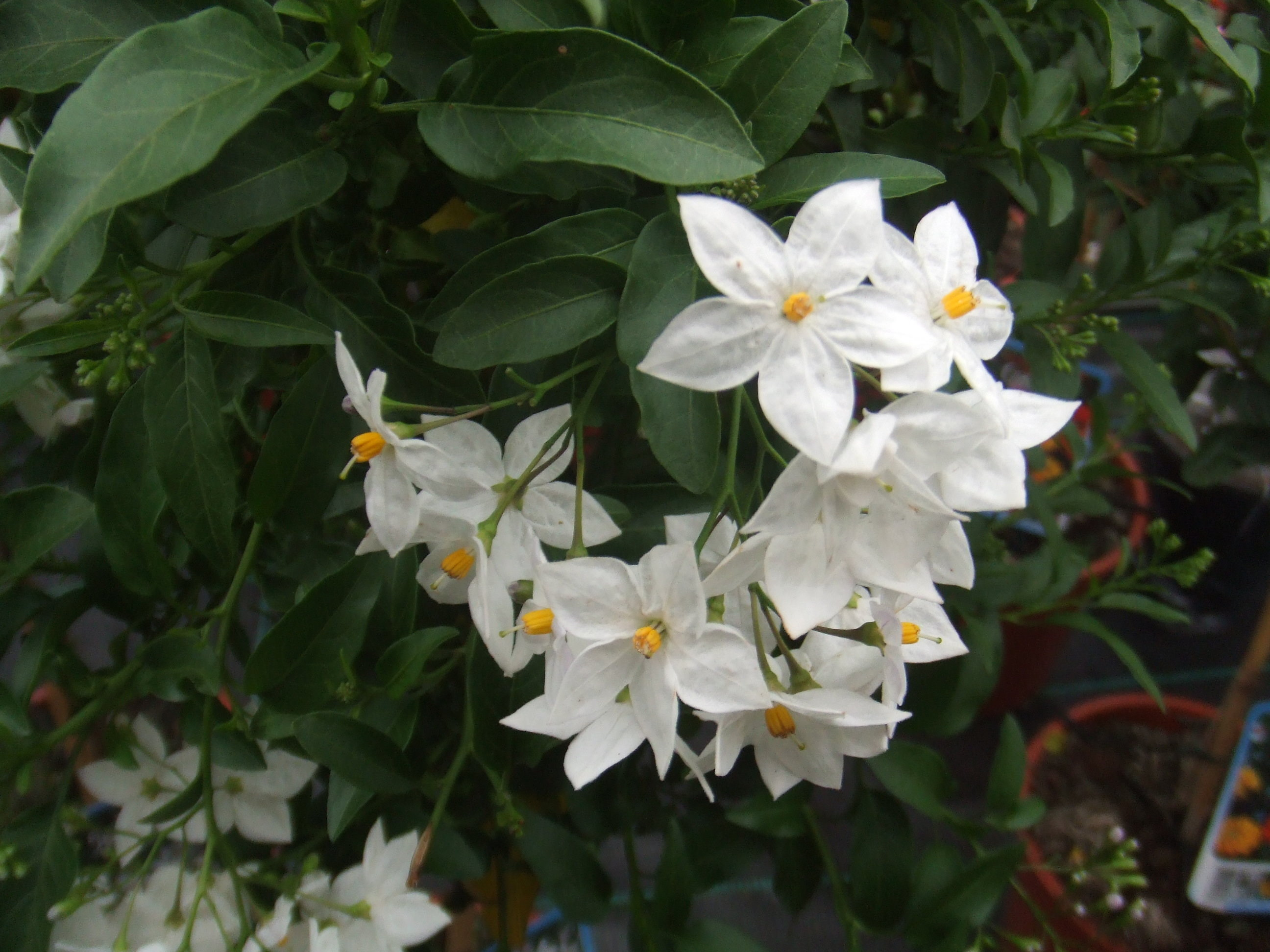
Jasmine nightshade (S. laxum) flowers

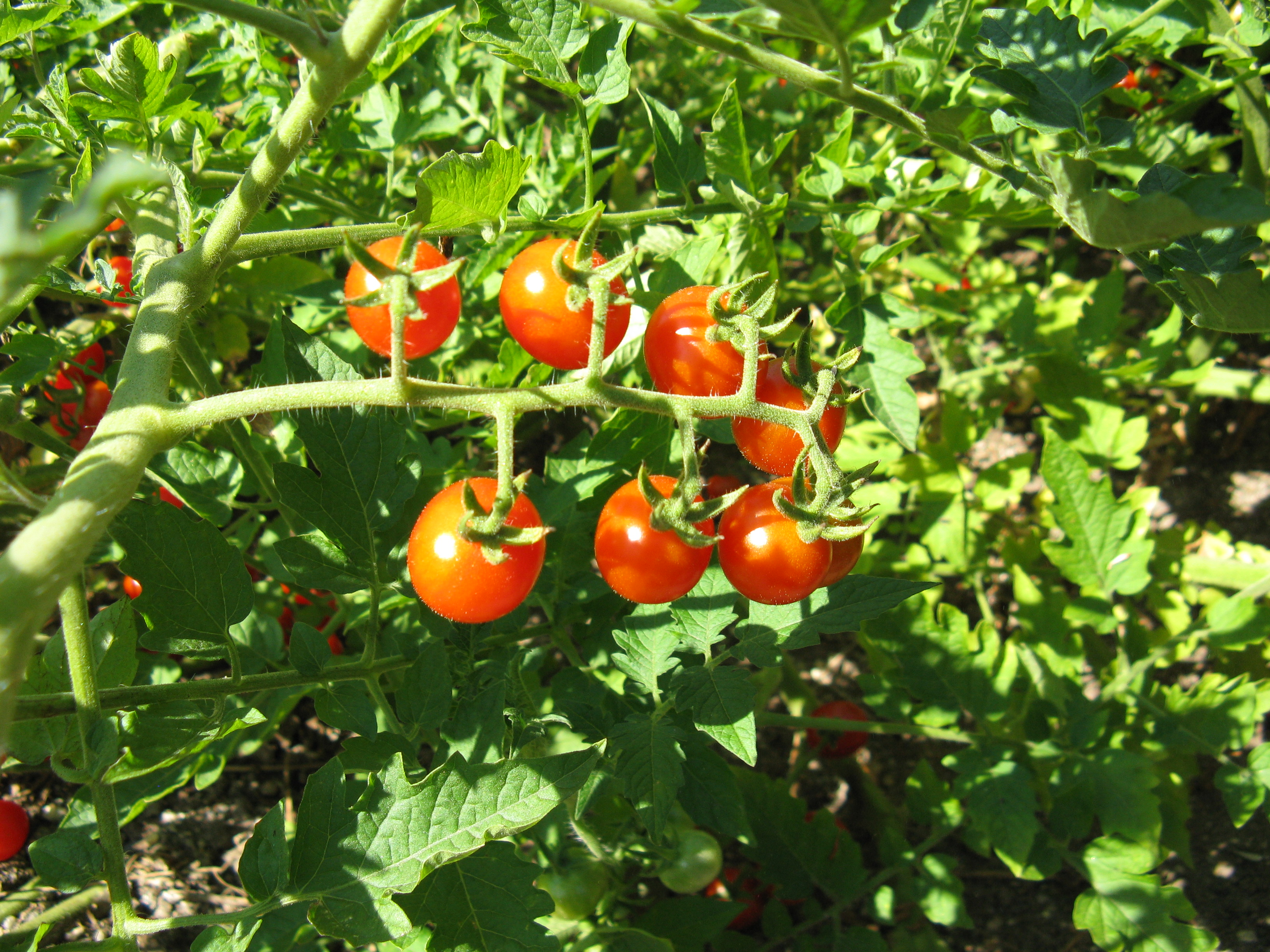
Currant tomato (S. pimpinellifolium) fruit

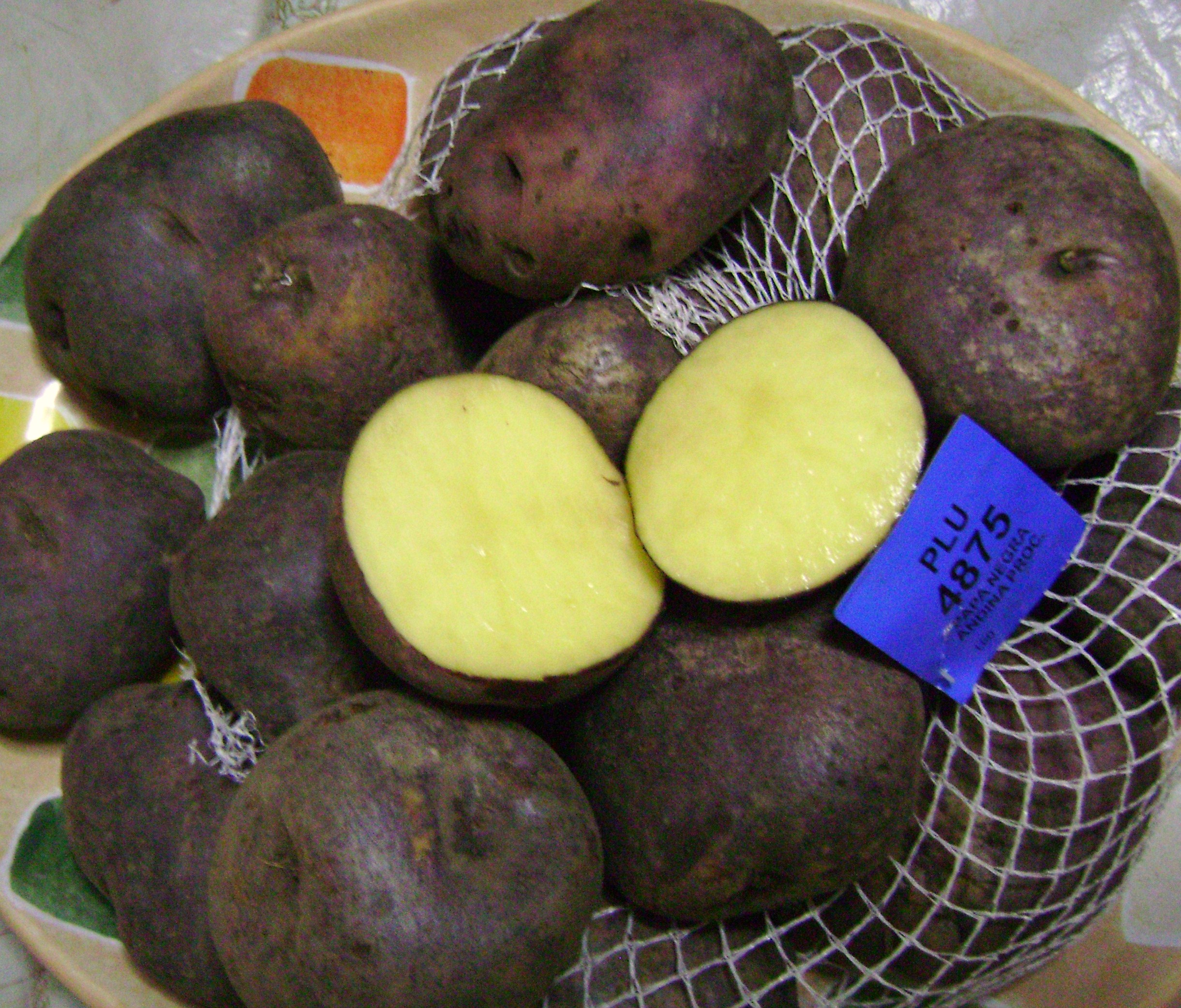
Andean black potatoes (S. tuberosum)

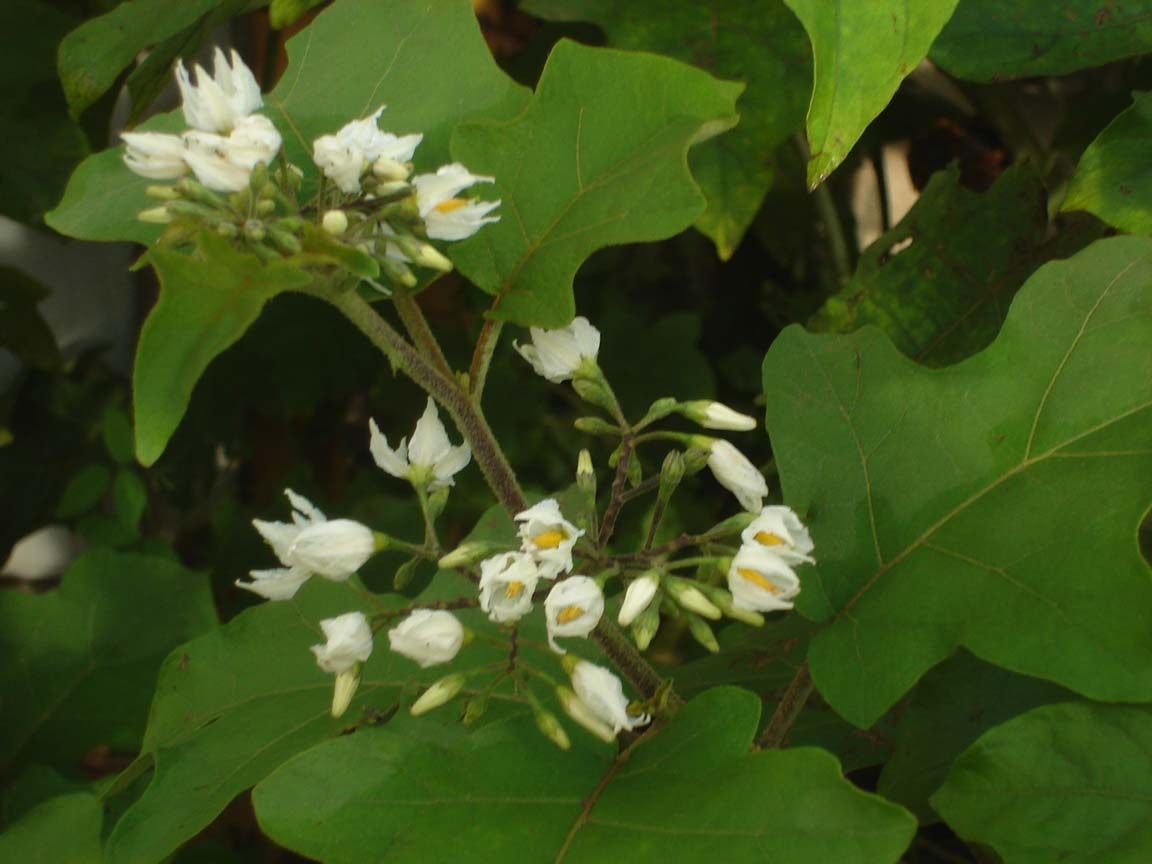
Turkey berry (S. torvum) flowers

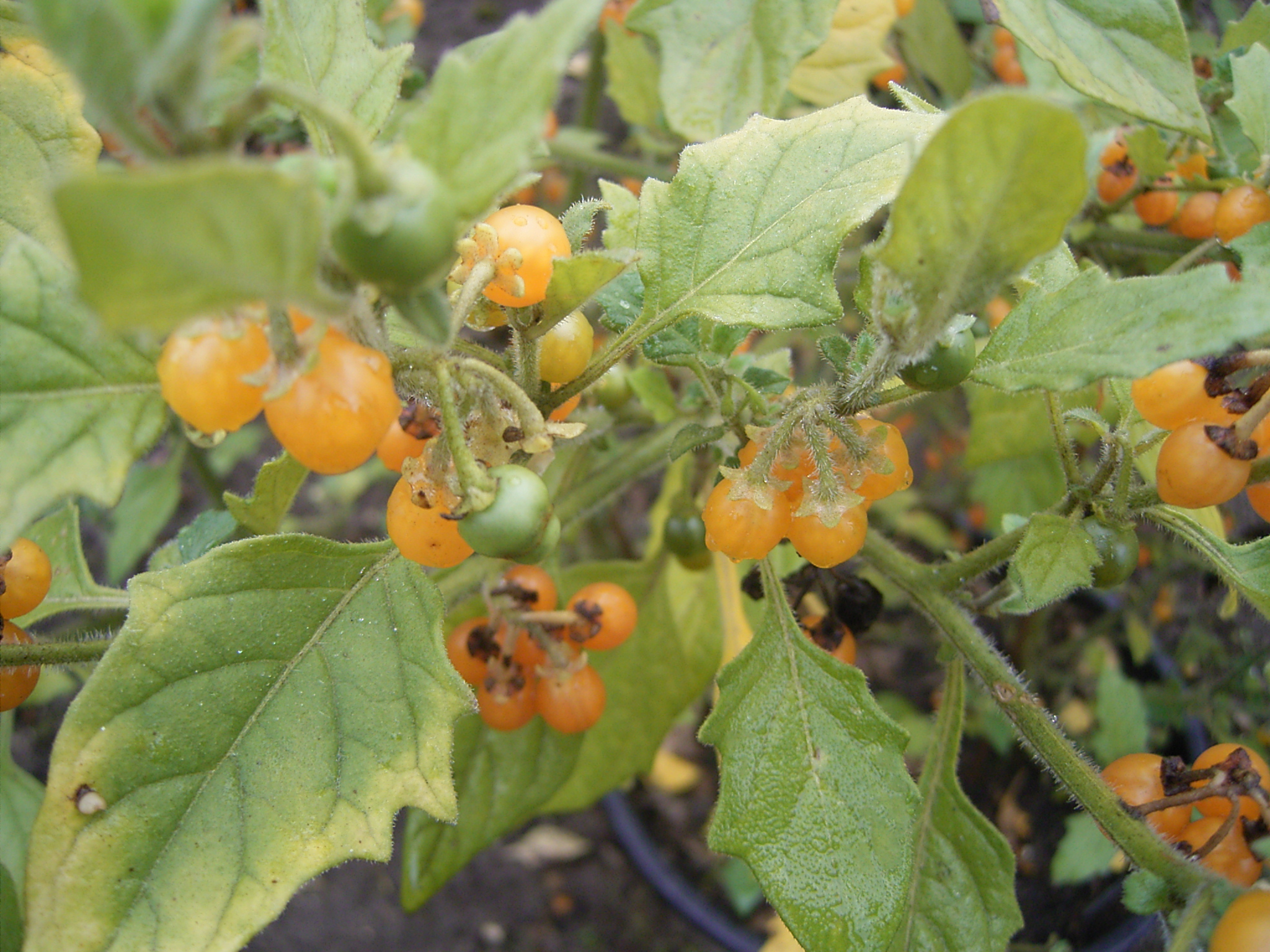
Yellow nightshade (S. villosum) fruit

Also known as: Solanum sensu stricto.

==== Section Anarrhichomenum ====
- Solanum baretiae

==== Section Archaesolanum ====
- Solanum aviculare – Poroporo (New Zealand), kangaroo apple (Australia)

==== Section Basarthrum ====
- Solanum catilliflorum
- Solanum muricatum – Pepino dulce, pepino melon, melon pear, "pepino", "tree melon"
- Solanum perlongistylum
- Solanum tergosericeum

==== Section Brevantherum ====
- Solanum bullatum
- Solanum erianthum D.Don – Potato tree, "mullein nightshade"
- Solanum mauritianum – Woolly nightshade, ear-leaved nightshade, flannel weed, bugweed, tobacco weed, kerosene plant, "wild tobacco" (Australia)
- Solanum evolvuloides

==== Section Dulcamara ====
- Solanum crispum – Chilean potato vine, Chilean nightshade, Chilean potato tree
- Solanum dulcamara – Bittersweet
- Solanum imbaburense
- Solanum laxum Spreng. – Jasmine nightshade
- Solanum leiophyllum
- Solanum seaforthianum Andrews – Brazilian nightshade
- Solanum triquetrum Cav. – Texas nightshade
- Solanum wallacei – Wallace's nightshade, Catalina nightshade, Clokey's nightshade, "wild tomato" (including S. clokeyi)
- Solanum xanti – Purple nightshade, San Diego nightshade

==== Section Holophylla ====
- Solanum diphyllum L. – Twin-leaved nightshade
- Solanum pseudocapsicum – Jerusalem cherry, Madeira winter cherry, "winter cherry" (including S. capsicastrum)
- Solanum pseudoquina (including S. inaequale Vell.)

==== Section Juglandifolia ====
- Solanum juglandifolium
- Solanum ochranthum

==== Section Lycopersicoides ====
- Solanum lycopersicoides Dunal – Peruvian wolfpeach
- Solanum sitiens

==== Section Lycopersicon ====
Also known as: tomato lineage.

- Solanum arcanum Peralta – "wild tomato"
- Solanum chilense
- Solanum corneliomulleri
- Solanum huaylasense Peralta
- Solanum peruvianum L. – Peruvian nightshade, "wild tomato"
- Solanum cheesmaniae (L.Riley) Fosberg
- Solanum chmielewskii
- Solanum galapagense S.C.Darwin & Peralta
- Solanum habrochaites
- Solanum lycopersicum – Tomato
- Solanum neorickii
- Solanum pennellii
- Solanum pimpinellifolium – Currant tomato

==== Section Normania ====
- †Solanum nava (?)

==== Section Petota ====
Also known as the "potato lineage". Including: subsections Estolonifera and Potatoe.

- Solanum albornozii
- Solanum bulbocastanum – Ornamental nightshade
- Solanum bukasovii Juz. ex Rybin
- Solanum burtonii
- Solanum cardiophyllum – Heart-leaved nightshade
- Solanum chilliasense
- Solanum commersonii Dunal – Commerson's nightshade
- Solanum demissum Lindl. – Dwarf wild potato
- Solanum jamesii – Wild potato
- Solanum minutifoliolum
- Solanum paucijugum
- Solanum phureja Juz. & Bukasov
- Solanum pinnatisectum Dunal – Tansy-leaved nightshade
- Solanum regularifolium
- Solanum stoloniferum Schltdl. – Tigna potato, Fendler's horsenettle
- Solanum stenotomum (including S. goniocalyx)
- Solanum ternatum (including S. ternifolium)
- Solanum tuberosum – Potato

==== Section Solanum ====
- Solanum adscendens Sendtner – Sonoita nightshade (Americas)
- Solanum americanum Mill. – American nightshade, American black nightshade, West Indian nightshade, glossy nightshade (Americas, Hawaiʻi)
- Solanum chenopodioides Lam. – Goosefoot nightshade, slender nightshade (including S. gracilius)
- Solanum douglasii Dunal – Green-spotted nightshade
- Solanum alatum – Eastern black nightshade
- Solanum interius Rydb.
- Solanum melongena L.
- Solanum nigrescens M.Martens & Galeotti – Divine nightshade
- Solanum nigrum L. – European black nightshade, "black nightshade"
  - S. nigrum guineense – "Garden Huckleberry"
- Solanum pseudogracile Heiser – Glowing nightshade
- Solanum retroflexum – Wonderberry, sunberry
- Solanum sarrachoides – Hairy nightshade
- Solanum scabrum Mill. – Garden huckleberry
- Solanum triflorum Nutt. – Cut-leaved nightshade
- Solanum villosum Mill. – Yellow nightshade

=== Notable species not otherwise placed ===
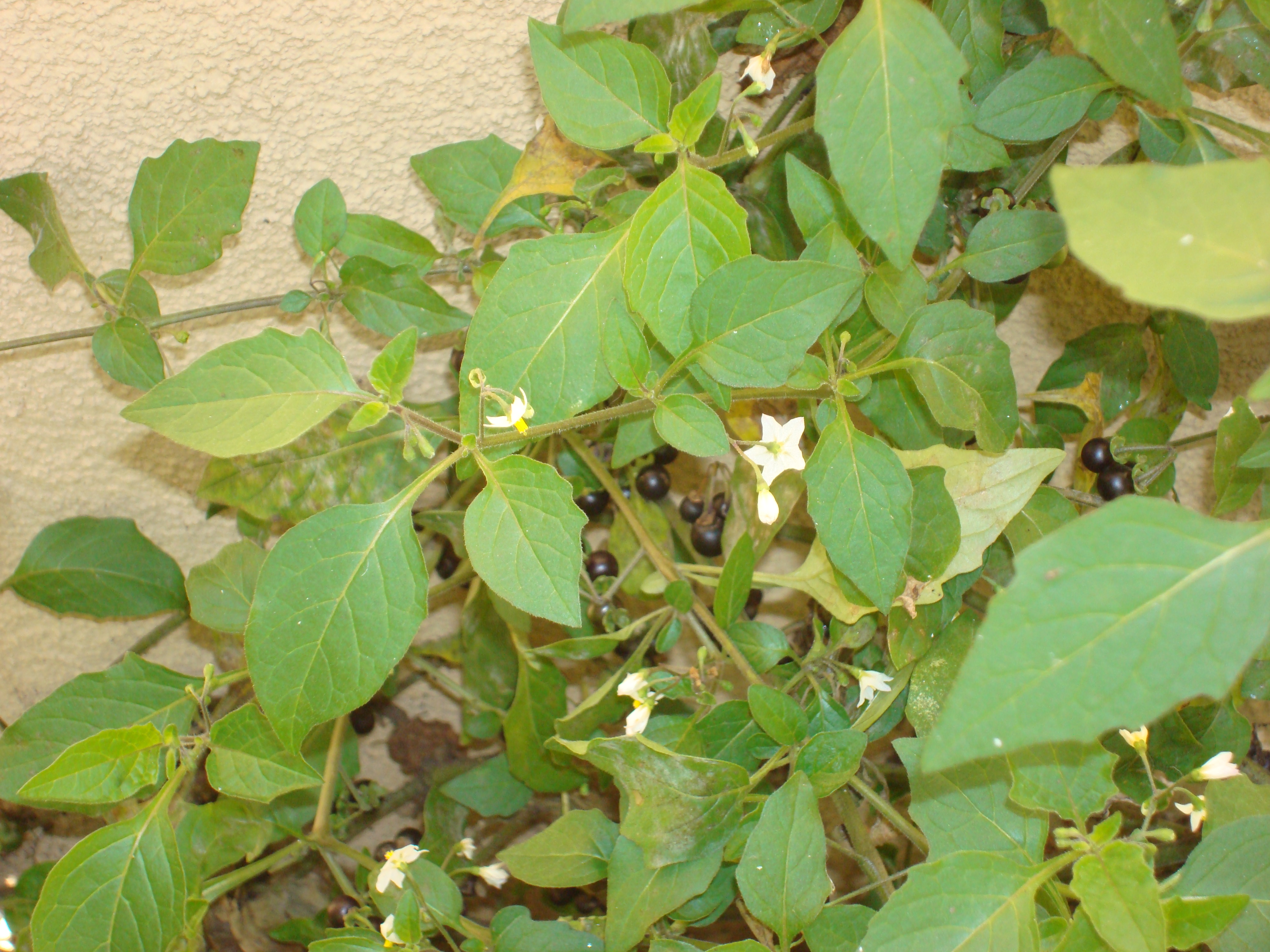
Forked nightshade (S. furcatum)

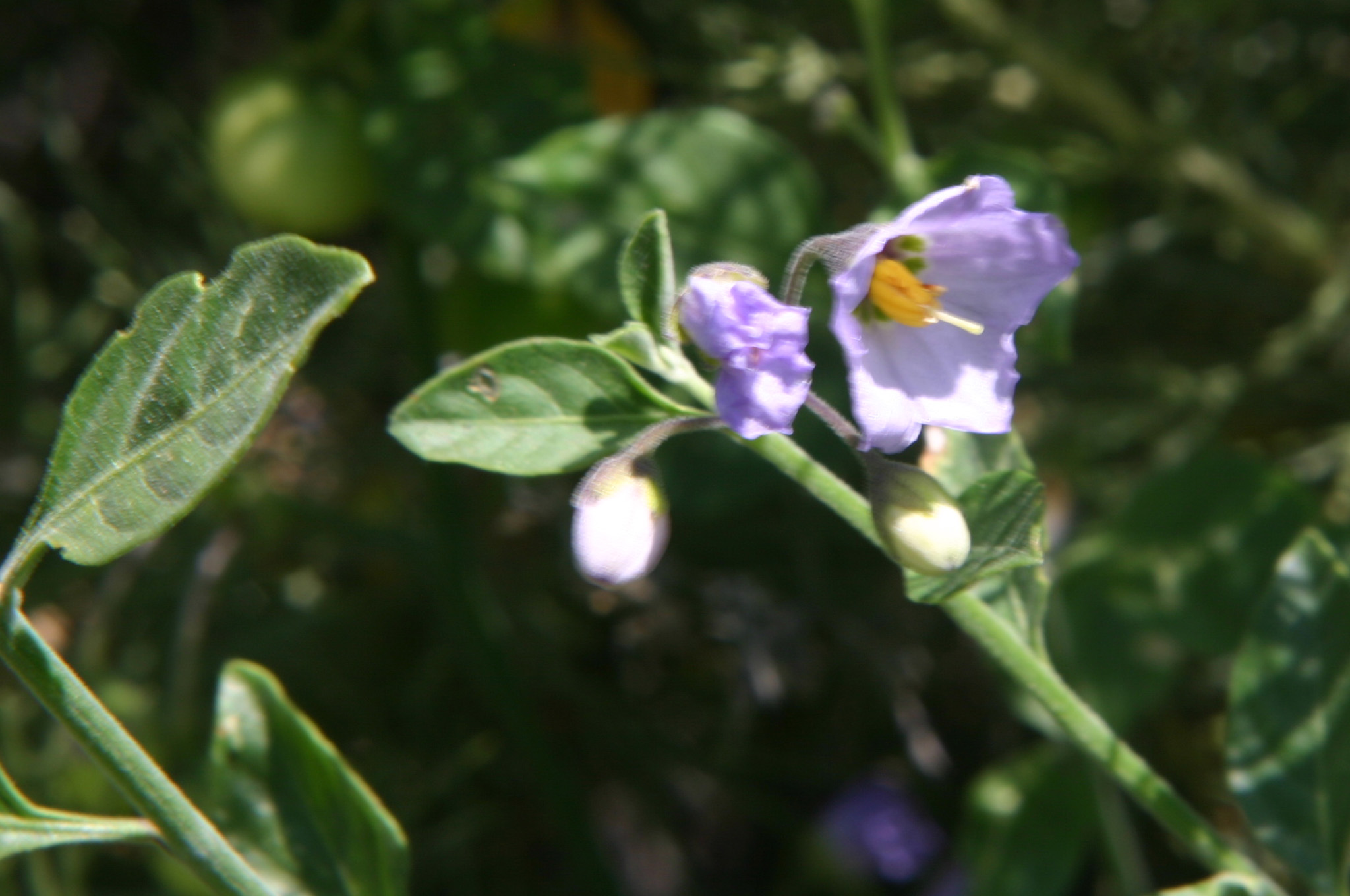
Bluewitch nightshade (S. umbelliferum) flowers

- Solanum abutiloides – Dwarf tamarillo
- Solanum amygdalifolium Steud.
- Solanum bellum
- Solanum cajanumense
- Solanum chimborazense
- Solanum chrysasteroides
- Solanum cinnamomeum
- Solanum conocarpum Rich. ex Dunal – Marron bacoba
- Solanum cowiei Martine
- Solanum cremastanthemum
- Solanum crinitum
- Solanum davisense Whalen – Davis' horsenettle
- Solanum densepilosulum
- Solanum donianum Walp. – Mullein nightshade
- Solanum dolichorhachis
- Solanum etuberosum – representative member of a clade that gave rise to the potatoes (petota clade) by hybridization with a member of the tomato clade
- Solanum fallax
- Solanum ferox L. – Hairy-fruited eggplant, Thai hairy-fruited eggplant
- Solanum fortunense
- Solanum furcatum – Forked nightshade
- Solanum glabratum Dunal
- Solanum haleakalaense H.St.John
- Solanum hindsianum Benth. – Hinds' nightshade
- Solanum hypermegethes
- Solanum hypocalycosarcum
- Solanum interandinum
- Solanum latiflorum
- Solanum leucodendron
- Solanum lumholtzianum Bartlett – Sonoran nightshade
- Solanum luteoalbum (including S. semicoalitum)
- Solanum lycocarpum – Wolf apple, fruta-de-lobo, lobeira (Brazil)
- Solanum melissarum Bohs
- Solanum nudum Dunal – Forest nightshade
- Solanum ovum-fringillae
- Solanum paralum
- Solanum parishii A.Heller – Parish's nightshade
- Solanum physalifolium Rusby
- Solanum pinetorum
- Solanum polygamum Vahl – Cakalaka berry
- Solanum pyrifolium Lam.
- Solanum pubescens Willd.
- Solanum riedlei Dunal – Riedle's nightshade
- Solanum rudepannum Dunal
- Solanum rugosum Dunal – tabacon aspero
- Solanum sibundoyense
- Solanum sodiroi (including S. carchiense)
- Solanum sycocarpum
- Solanum tenuipes Bartlett – Fancy nightshade
- Solanum tobagense
- Solanum trilobatum L.
- Solanum umbelliferum – Bluewitch nightshade
- Solanum violaceum Ortega
- Solanum viride Spreng. – Green Nightshade
- Solanum woodburyi Howard – Woodbury's nightshade

=== Formerly placed here ===
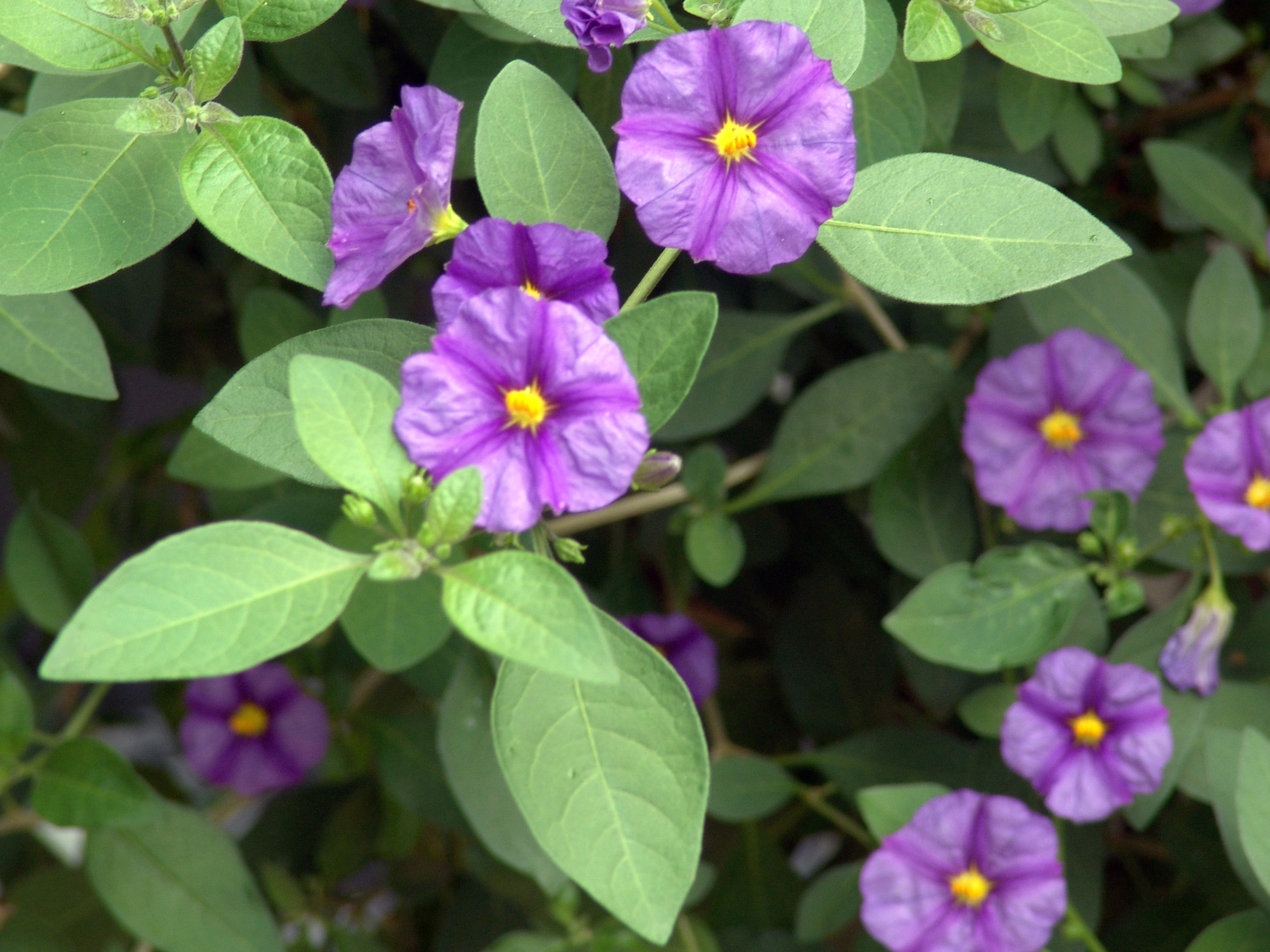
Lycianthes rantonnetii and its congeners were often placed in Solanum.

Some plants of other genera were formerly placed in Solanum:

- Chamaesaracha coronopus (as S. coronopus)
- Cordia alliodora (as S. mucronatum)
- Lycianthes biflora (as S. multifidum Buch.-Ham. ex D.Don)
- Lycianthes denticulata (as S. gouakai var. angustifolium and var. latifolium)
- Lycianthes lycioides (as S. lycioides var. angustifolium)
- Lycianthes mociniana (as S. uniflorum Dunal in Poir. and S. uniflorum Sessé & Moc.)
- Lycianthes rantonnetii (as S. rantonnetii, S. urbanum var. ovatifolium and var. typicum)
- Undetermined species of Lycianthes have been referred to under names such as S. chrysophyllum, S. ciliatum Blume ex Miq., S. corniculatum Hiern, S. lanuginosum, S. retrofractum var. acuminatum, S. violaceum Blume, S. violifolium f. typicum, S. virgatum notst β albiflorum, S. uniflorum Lag. or S. uniflorum var. berterianum.

== Phylogeny ==
The following phylogeny of Solanaceae is from Zhang et al. (2025) figure 1B. It is based on a consensus of 500 trees randomly sampled from 1-Mb genomic windows with 200-kb step size.

- - - Solanum
      - - - - - Tomato (= sect. Lycopersicon)
              - Petota (Tomato × Etuberosum)
              - Etuberosum
            - Anarrhicomenum
          - Basarthrum
        - - Moreilloid ("Maurella", "Morella")
          - Dulcamaroid
      - - - Brevantherum
          - Geminata
        - - - - Crinitum
              - Sisymbriifolium
            - - Acanthophora
              - Lasiocarpa
          - - Androceras
            - Eastern Hemisphere Spiny
    - - - Lycianthes
        - Physalis
      - Jaltomata
  - - Datura
    - Nicandra
- - Lycium
  - Nicotiana

The non-italicized names inside of Solanum refer to the major clade names within Solanum. These names usually include the similarly-named section but do not have taxonomic standing.

== Ecology ==
Some Solanum species are used as food plants by the larvae of some Lepidoptera species (butterflies and moths).

== Toxicity ==
Most parts of the plants, especially the green parts and unripe fruit, are poisonous to humans (although not necessarily to other animals), with some species even being deadly.

This toxicity is due to glycoalkaloids, such as α-solanine and α-chaconine, which act as a natural defense mechanism for the plant against pests and pathogens.

== Uses ==
Many species in the genus bear some edible parts, such as fruits, leaves, or tubers. Three crops in particular have been bred and harvested for consumption by humans for centuries, and are now cultivated on a global scale:

- Tomato, S. lycopersicum
  - Tomato varieties are sometimes bred from both S. lycopersicum and wild tomato species such as S. pimpinellifolium, S. peruvianum, S. cheesmanii, S. galapagense, S. chilense, etc. (such varieties include—among others—Bicentennial, Dwarf Italian, Epoch, Golden Sphere, Hawaii, Ida Red, Indigo Rose, Kauai, Lanai, Marion, Maui, Molokai, Niihau, Oahu, Owyhee, Parma, Payette, Red Lode, Super Star, Surecrop, Tuckers Forcing, V 121, Vantage, Vetomold, and Waltham.)
- Potato, S. tuberosum, fourth largest food crop.
  - Less important but cultured relatives used in small amounts include S. stenotomum, S. phureja, S. goniocalyx, S. ajanhuiri, S. chaucha, S. juzepczukii, S. curtilobum.
- Eggplant (also known as brinjal or aubergine), S. melongena

Other species are significant food crops regionally, such as Ethiopian eggplant or scarlet eggplant (S. aethiopicum), naranjilla or lulo (S. quitoense), cocona (S. sessiliflorum), turkey berry (S. torvum), pepino or pepino melon (S. muricatum), tamarillo (S. betaceum), wolf apple (S. lycocarpum), garden huckleberry (S. scabrum) and "bush tomatoes" (several Australian species).

=== Ornamentals ===
The species most widely seen in cultivation as ornamental plants are:

- Solanum aviculare G.Forst. - (kangaroo apple)
- Solanum crispum Ruiz & Pav. - (Chilean potato tree)
- Solanum laciniatum Aiton - (kangaroo apple)
- Solanum laxum Spreng. - (potato vine)
- Solanum mammosum L. - (Nipplefruit, titty fruit, cow's udder, apple of Sodom)
- Solanum pseudocapsicum L. - (Christmas cherry, winter cherry)
- Solanum seaforthianum Andrews - (Italian jasmine, St. Vincent lilac)
- Solanum mauritianum Scop. - (woolly nightshade, earleaf nightshade)
- Solanum wendlandii Hook.f. - (paradise flower, potato vine)

=== Medicine ===
Several species are locally used in folk medicine, particularly by native people who have long employed them.
