= Solanum triquetrum =

Scientific classification
- Kingdom: Plantae
- Clade: Tracheophytes
- Clade: Angiosperms
- Clade: Eudicots
- Clade: Asterids
- Order: Solanales
- Family: Solanaceae
- Genus: Solanum
- Species: S. triquetrum

Binomial name
- Solanum triquetrum Cav.

Synonyms
- Solanum lindheimerianum Scheele; Solanum triquetrum var. lindheimerianum (Scheele) A.Gray ex Blankinship

Species of plant

Solanum triquetrum, the Texas nightshade, is a species of flowering plant in the family Solanaceae, native to Texas and northeastern Mexico. A perennial, it is usually 1 to 2 ft (30 to 60 cm) tall, but if given a support to climb on it can reach 7 ft (2 m).
