= Solanum bullatum =

Conservation status
- Conservation Dependent (IUCN 2.3)

Scientific classification
- Kingdom: Plantae
- Clade: Tracheophytes
- Clade: Angiosperms
- Clade: Eudicots
- Clade: Asterids
- Order: Solanales
- Family: Solanaceae
- Genus: Solanum
- Species: S. bullatum

Binomial name
- Solanum bullatum Vell.

Species of flowering plant

Solanum bullatum is a species of plant in the family Solanaceae. It is endemic to southeastern Brazil, in Atlantic Forest habitats. It is found in the states of Bahia, Minas Gerais, Paraná, Rio de Janeiro, Santa Catarina, and São Paulo.
