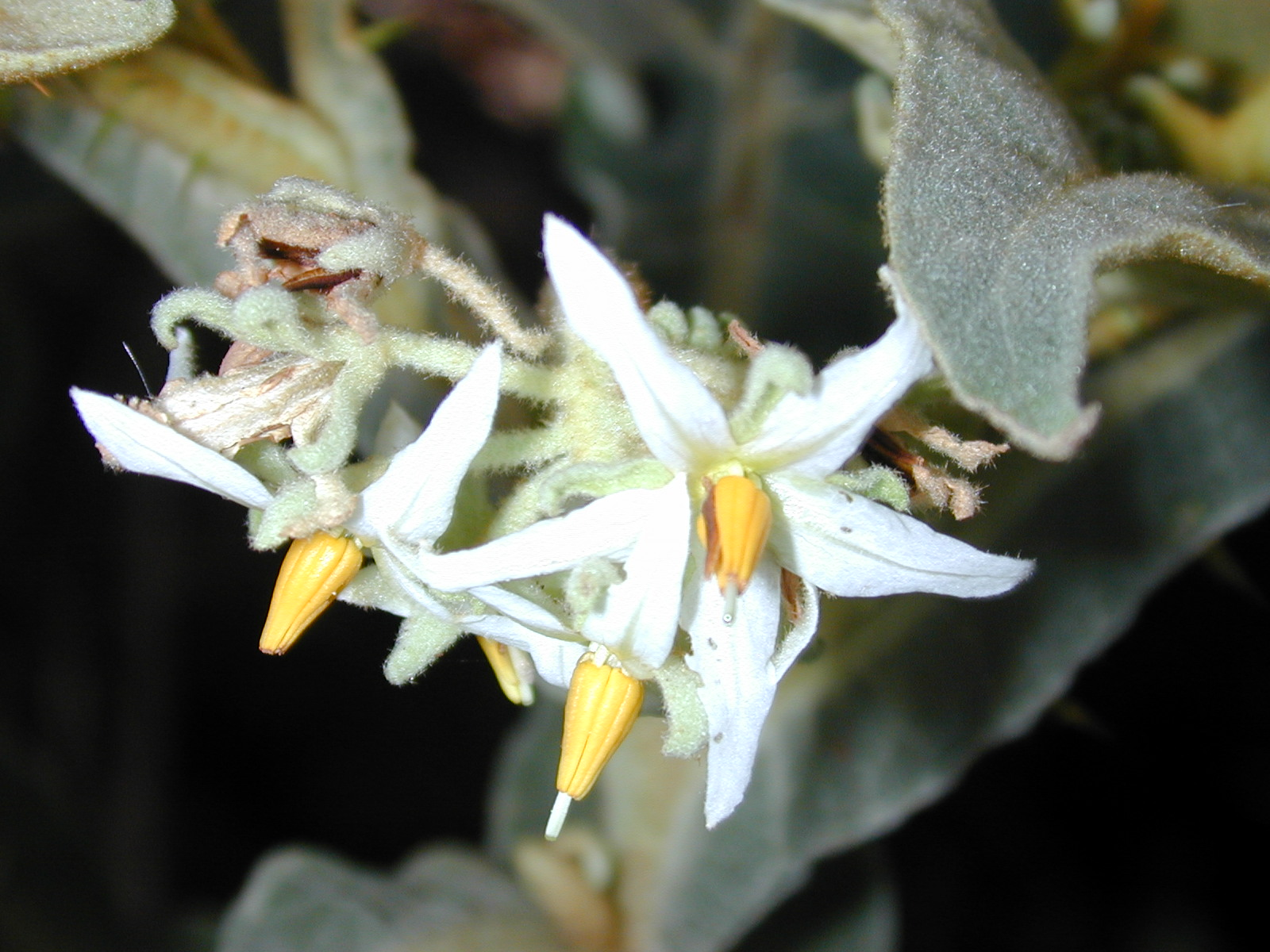

Scientific classification
- Kingdom: Plantae
- Clade: Tracheophytes
- Clade: Angiosperms
- Clade: Eudicots
- Clade: Asterids
- Order: Solanales
- Family: Solanaceae
- Genus: Solanum
- Species: S. robustum

Binomial name
- Solanum robustum H.Wendl

Synonyms
- List: Solanum alatum Seem. & J.A.Schmidt; Solanum concepcionis Chodat & Hassl.; Solanum concepcionis var. robustius Chodat; Solanum concepcionis var. typicum Chodat; Solanum euracanthum Dunal; Solanum robustum var. concepcionis Hassl.; Solanum robustum f. decurrens Hassl.; Solanum robustum var. laxepilosum Hassl.; Solanum robustum f. rupestre Hassl.; Solanum robustum f. typicum Hassl.

= Solanum robustum =

Species of shrub

Solanum robustum, the shrubby nightshade, is a species of thorny perennial shrub native to north-eastern South America. It is related to the potato and tomato.

== Description ==
A medium shrub, the plant may grow 4 to 8 feet (1.2 – 2.4 m) with velvety leaves and stems due to dense stellate trichomes present on all faces of the plant. Strong, straight or recurved flattened prickles up to 12 millimeters long may be found along the stems. The leaves grow 6 to 10 inches long and feature nine angled ridges along their perimeter. S. robustum blooms between late spring and mid fall with small clusters of white to yellow-white star shaped inflorescence followed by white or yellowish marble sized berries. S. robustum contains various tropane alkaloids in its leaves, fruit and stems and therefore should not be consumed.
