= Solanum cowiei =

Scientific classification
- Kingdom: Plantae
- Clade: Tracheophytes
- Clade: Angiosperms
- Clade: Eudicots
- Clade: Asterids
- Order: Solanales
- Family: Solanaceae
- Genus: Solanum
- Species: S. cowiei

Binomial name
- Solanum cowiei Martine

Synonyms
- Solanum sp. Litchfield (I.D.Cowie 1428) NT Herbarium

Species of shrub

Solanum cowiei is a small fruiting subshrub in the family Solanaceae. It is endemic to the Northern Territory in Australia. The fruit is a green berry, up to 15 mm in diameter, that later becomes black-green and detaches from the calyx.

The species was formally described in 2013 by Christopher T. Martine. The specific epithet honours Dr. Ian Cowie, the Chief Botanist at the Northern Territory Herbarium. It is placed within the "Dioicum Complex" of Solanum subgenus Leptostemonum.
