= Solanum albornozii =

Conservation status
- Endangered (IUCN 3.1)

Scientific classification
- Kingdom: Plantae
- Clade: Tracheophytes
- Clade: Angiosperms
- Clade: Eudicots
- Clade: Asterids
- Order: Solanales
- Family: Solanaceae
- Genus: Solanum
- Species: S. albornozii

Binomial name
- Solanum albornozii Correll

Species of flowering plant

Solanum albornozii is a species of plant in the family Solanaceae. It is endemic to Ecuador.
