= Solanum lanuginosum =

Conservation status
- Critically Endangered (IUCN 3.1)

Scientific classification
- Kingdom: Plantae
- Clade: Tracheophytes
- Clade: Angiosperms
- Clade: Eudicots
- Clade: Asterids
- Order: Solanales
- Family: Solanaceae
- Genus: Solanum
- Species: S. lanuginosum

Binomial name
- Solanum lanuginosum Humb. & Bonpl. ex Dunal

Species of plant

Solanum lanuginosum is a flowering plant species in the nightshade family (Solanaceae). It probably belongs to those species formerly in Solanum but nowadays placed in Lycianthes, though its exact identity and name remain undetermined.

It is endemic to Ecuador, but may be almost extinct due to habitat loss.
