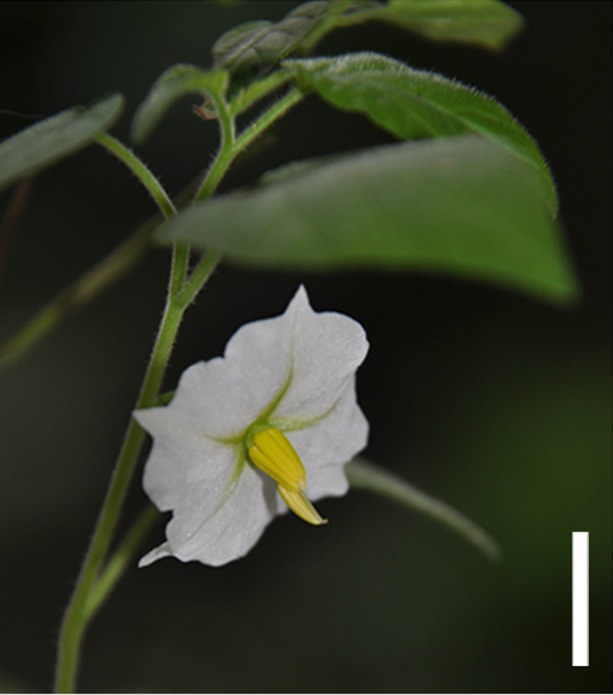

Scientific classification
- Kingdom: Plantae
- Clade: Embryophytes
- Clade: Tracheophytes
- Clade: Angiosperms
- Clade: Eudicots
- Clade: Asterids
- Order: Solanales
- Family: Solanaceae
- Genus: Solanum
- Section: Solanum sect. Gonatotrichum
- Species: S. evolvuloides

Binomial name
- Solanum evolvuloides Giacomin & Stehmann

= Solanum evolvuloides =

Species of plant

Solanum evolvuloides is a species of Solanum, which was first described in 2011 by Giacomin & Stehmann. Solanum evolvuloides belongs to section Gonatotrichum, a small group assigned to the Brevantherum clade of the genus Solanum. It resembles Solanum turneroides Chodat, sharing with it heterandry, and Solanum parcistrigosum Bitter, with which it shares a similar habit and pubescence. Despite these similarities, the species can be recognized by its ovate-elliptic to cordiform leaf shape and more membranaceous leaf texture than the other species in the section, and stem, inflorescence axes, and calyx vestiture mainly composed of glandular hairs. Solanum evolvuloides is known to occur only in southeastern of Bahia state, Brazil, and in a preliminary assessment of the International Union for Conservation of Nature (IUCN) criteria can be considered a threatened species.

== Description ==
Herbs, slightly woody to woody at base, few- to many-branched, 20–40 cm tall. Stems moderately to densely pubescent with multicelled unbranched erect glandular hairs ca. 0.3–0.5 mm long, these mixed with less frequent slightly longer 1–3-celled unbranched eglandular hairs. Sympodial units defoliate, solitary or more commonly geminate, the smaller leaves up to half the size of the larger ones. Leaves simple, the blades 1–4 × 1–3 cm, ovate-elliptic to cordiform, chartaceous to membranaceous, sparsely to moderately pubescent on both sides with 1–2-celled unbranched erect eglandular hairs, these denser on the primary and secondary veins; venation camptodromous, with the primary and one pair of secondary veins emerging from the leaf base (sometimes just one, in the case of an asymmetric base), the primary and secondary veins barely visible to the naked eye, slightly prominent abaxially and less visible adaxially; base attenuate to cordate, slightly decurrent into petiole; margins entire, ciliate with hairs like those of the blade; apex acute to attenuate; petioles 0.5–2.2 cm long, with pubescence similar to that of the stems but with fewer eglandular hairs. Inflorescencessessile, lateral, extra-axillary or subopposite the leaves, unbranched, with 1–4 flowers, the axes with pubescence like that of the stems; peduncles absent; rachis very short; pedicels 6–10 mm in flower, 7–14 mm in fruit, almost contiguous, articulated at the base. Flowers 5-merous. Calyx 2–7 mm long, the tube 1–2 mm, the lobes 2–6 × 1–2.6 mm, ovate-elliptic, the apex acuminate, moderately pubescent abaxially with almost exclusively glandular unbranched multicellular erect hairs, densely pubescent adaxially with very small glandular hairs with 1-celled stalks; calyx accrescent in fruit, the lobes up to 8 mm long, equal to or exceeding the berry at maturity. Corolla 1–2.5 (-3) cm in diameter, rotate with abundant interpetalar tissue, membranaceous, white, the lobes 2–4 × 1–3 mm, triangular, acute at apex, with a few eglandular hairs abaxially, mainly on the central part of each lobe, glabrous adaxially. Stamens 4–9.5 mm long; filaments 1–2 mm long, with one much longer than the others, up to 5 mm long, glabrous; anthers 4–6 × 1.3–2 mm, connivent, yellow, the base cordate, with a small bulge dorsally, the apex emarginate, the pores directed introrsely and subapically, not opening into longitudinal slits. Ovary glabrous; style 7–9 mm long, longer than the smaller stamens, cylindrical, glabrous, curved near apex, closely appressed to the larger stamen; stigma capitate. Fruits 0.8–1.5 cm in diameter, globose berries, greenish white when immature, translucent at maturity, drying light-brown to blackish, glabrous, the mesocarp watery and held under pressure, dehiscing explosively at maturity, normally between two calyx lobes. Seeds 10–25 per fruit, 2.5–3.6 × 1.8–2.9 mm, flattened, reniform, with a small hollow where connected to the placenta, the margin flattened, forming a winged projection, the seed surface with raised projections and grooves parallel to margin, giving a netlike impression.

Flowering and fruiting material has been collected between February and August, with a flowering peak from February to May; fruiting specimens were collected from June to August. Under cultivation, flowers were observed to open only in the morning, closing during the evening. Observations of the same flower during consecutive days confirmed this pattern.

== Taxonomy ==
The epithet evolvuloides evokes the strong resemblance of this species to a sympatric species of the genus Evolvulus (Convolvulaceae).

== Distribution ==
This species is known only from the southeastern part of Bahia state, Brazil, occurring in the transition zone between deciduous forests and xeric formations of shrubby Caatinga (as defined by Velloso et al. 2002). See Distribution Map.

== Ecology ==
Solanum evolvuloides was recently recollected by the first author in the municipality of Jequié in a typical shrubby Caatinga formation, that is associated in this region with large granitic outcrops. The occurrence on the banks of the Rio de Contas near the city of Itacaré (Jardim, J.G. 1843) might be an occasional case of water dispersal by the river, which arises in a xeric environment near the center of the state in the Caatinga biome. Despite having been found in environments with marked seasonality, the species is apparently not annual, as evidenced by the woody stem bases.

== Preliminary conservation status ==
Endangered (EN) B1 a, b (i, ii, iii, iv). Solanum evolvuloides is known from only two localities, where the landscape has been strongly modified in the last decades due to the expansion of urban centers and extensive farming. The region has been focus of several surveys undertaken by CEPEC (Centro de Pesquisas do Cacau), in association with the New York Botanical Garden; despite this, only a few collections of this species have been made. Although one collection was made in a very disturbed area (Jardim 1843), the most recent collection is from a well-preserved forest fragment, and the species was not found in surrounding areas. There are no collections from within conservation units.
