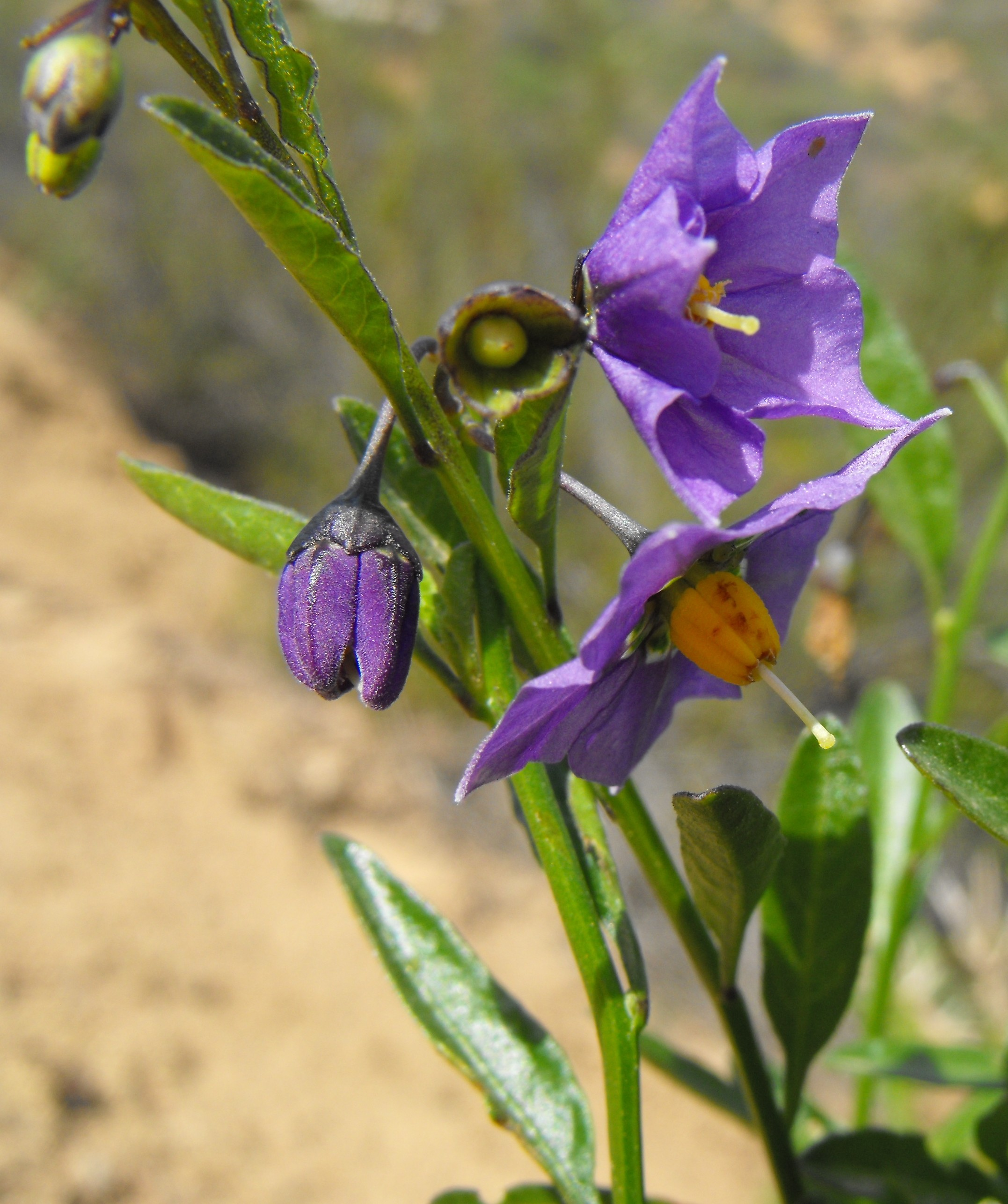

Scientific classification
- Kingdom: Plantae
- Clade: Tracheophytes
- Clade: Angiosperms
- Clade: Eudicots
- Clade: Asterids
- Order: Solanales
- Family: Solanaceae
- Genus: Solanum
- Species: S. umbelliferum
- Variety: S. u. var. glabrescens

Trinomial name
- Solanum umbelliferum var. glabrescens Torr.

Synonyms
- Solanum parishii A.Heller; Solanum xanti var. glabrescens Parish

= Solanum umbelliferum var. glabrescens =

Species of flowering plant

Solanum umbelliferum var. glabrescens, commonly known as Parish's nightshade, is a variety of nightshade. It is native to western North America from southern Oregon to north-western Baja California, where it grows in many types of habitat, including maritime and inland chaparral, woodlands, and forests.

== Description ==
It is a perennial herb or subshrub producing a branching, ribbed or ridged stem up to about a meter in maximum height. The lance-shaped to nearly oval leaves are up to 7 centimeters long and smooth-edged or somewhat wavy. The inflorescence is an umbel-shaped array of several flowers, each borne on a short pedicel. The flower corolla is around 2 centimeters wide when fully open and is usually purple, but sometimes white. At the center are yellow anthers. The fruit is a berry roughly a centimeter wide.
