= Solanum andreanum =

Conservation status
- Data Deficient (IUCN 3.1)

Scientific classification
- Kingdom: Plantae
- Clade: Tracheophytes
- Clade: Angiosperms
- Clade: Eudicots
- Clade: Asterids
- Order: Solanales
- Family: Solanaceae
- Genus: Solanum
- Species: S. andreanum

Binomial name
- Solanum andreanum Baker

Synonyms
- List: Solanum baezense Ochoa; Solanum burtonii Ochoa; Solanum correllii Ochoa; Solanum cyanophyllum Correll; Solanum paucijugum Bitter; Solanum pichinchense Bitter & Sodiro; Solanum regularifolium Correll; Solanum serratoris Ochoa; Solanum solisii Hawkes; Solanum suffrutescens Correll; Solanum tuquerrense Hawkes

Species of flowering plant

Solanum andreanum is a species of plant in the family Solanaceae. It is endemic to Ecuador.
