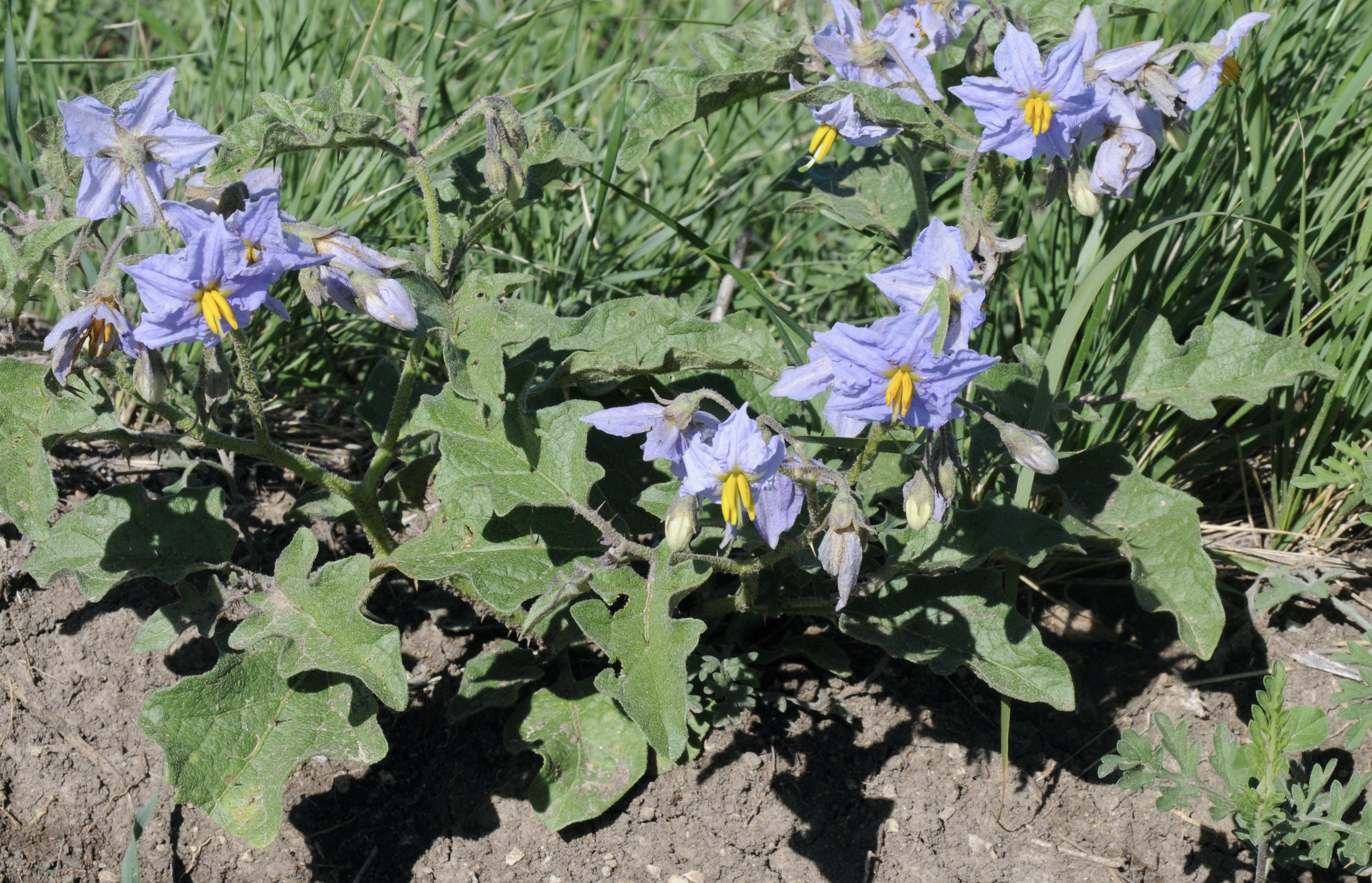

Scientific classification
- Kingdom: Plantae
- Clade: Tracheophytes
- Clade: Angiosperms
- Clade: Eudicots
- Clade: Asterids
- Order: Solanales
- Family: Solanaceae
- Genus: Solanum
- Species: S. dimidiatum

Binomial name
- Solanum dimidiatum Raf.

Synonyms
- Solanum torreyi

= Solanum dimidiatum =

Species of flowering plant

Solanum dimidiatum is a species of plant in the family Solanaceae known by the common names western horsenettle, Torrey's nightshade, and robust horsenettle. It is native to the central United States, where it grows in many types of habitat, including disturbed areas. In California it is known as an introduced species and a noxious weed. It is a rhizomatous perennial herb producing an erect stem up to 80 centimeters tall. It is covered in yellow prickles and branched hairs. The leaves may be up to 15 centimeters long, their edges wavy to lobed and sometimes toothed. The inflorescence is a branching array of several flowers. Each flower has a bell-shaped corolla measuring 3 to 5 centimeters wide. It is lavender to purple, or white. The five large, yellow anthers are about a centimeter long. The fruit is a spherical yellow berry up to 3 centimeters wide.

== Etymology ==
The specific epithet "dimidiatum" comes from Latin, meaning halved.
