= Solanum jamaicense =

Conservation status
- Least Concern (IUCN 3.1)

Scientific classification
- Kingdom: Plantae
- Clade: Embryophytes
- Clade: Tracheophytes
- Clade: Angiosperms
- Clade: Eudicots
- Clade: Asterids
- Order: Solanales
- Family: Solanaceae
- Genus: Solanum
- Species: S. jamaicense

Binomial name
- Solanum jamaicense Mill.

Species of plant

Solanum jamaicense, commonly known as Jamaican nightshade, is a species of shrub or liana in the family of Solanaceae which is native to the Caribbean Islands and areas of Central and South America. It was traditionally used as a medicinal plant in indigenous medicines and its fruit was consumed as food. In recent years it has become an invasive species in places like Indonesia and the US state of Florida.
