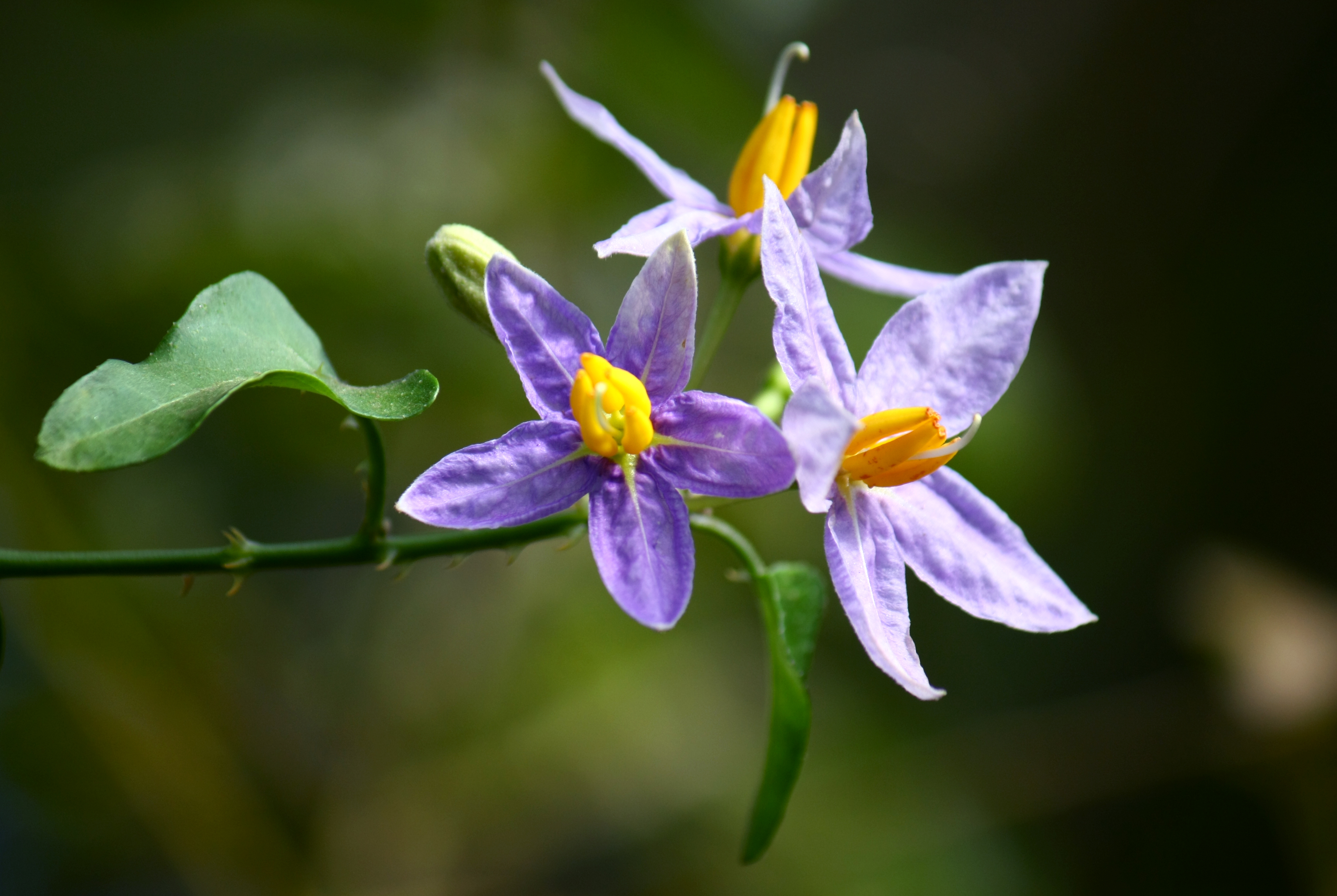

Scientific classification
- Kingdom: Plantae
- Clade: Tracheophytes
- Clade: Angiosperms
- Clade: Eudicots
- Clade: Asterids
- Order: Solanales
- Family: Solanaceae
- Genus: Solanum
- Species: S. trilobatum

Binomial name
- Solanum trilobatum L.

Synonyms
- Solanum acetosifolium Lam.; Solanum canaranum Miq.; Solanum canaranum Miq. ex C.B.Clarke; Solanum fuscum B.Heyne ex Wall.; Solanum griffithii (C.B.Clarke) Kuntze; Solanum prostratum Raeusch.

= Solanum trilobatum =

Species of herb

Solanum trilobatum is a plant species in the nightshade family Solanaceae. It is native to India, Sri Lanka and mainland Southeast Asia. It is used as a medicinal herb.

== Description ==
Solanum trilobatum is a delicate, tropical perennial plant often cultivated in temperate climates.

Key Characteristics:

- Appearance: A climbing shrub with spiny stems, five-lobed leaves, a corolla with yellow stamens, and small white or purple flowers. The fruit is small, red coloured like berry.
- Medicinal Uses: Traditional medicine has utilized various parts of the plant, including leaves, roots, and fruits, for treating a wide range of ailments:
  - Respiratory issues: Asthma, bronchitis, and cough
  - Digestive disorders: Indigestion, diarrhoea, and constipation
  - Liver ailments: Hepatitis and jaundice
  - Skin conditions: Eczema and psoriasis
- Traditional Uses:
  - Decoctions: Leaves and roots are often brewed into decoctions for internal consumption.
  - Pastes: Leaves or fruits may be crushed into pastes and applied topically for skin conditions.
  - Infusions: Dried leaves can be used to make infusions.

== Uses and medical research ==
Solanum trilobatum is not only used in the Indian cuisine for culinary purposes and a home medication as a remedy for common ailments such as fever, cold and cough, it has been the subject of numerous scientific investigations to validate its traditional medicinal uses and to isolate and identify the active compounds responsible for its therapeutic effects. Here are some key areas of research:

Phytochemical Analysis

- Identification of bioactive compounds: Studies have focused on identifying the phytochemicals present in Solanum trilobatum, including alkaloids, flavonoids, terpenoids, and saponins.
- Isolation of active principles: Specific compounds, such as withanolides and solasodine, have been isolated and further studied for their potential medicinal properties.

Pharmacological Studies

- Antioxidant activity: Research has demonstrated the antioxidant properties of Solanum trilobatum, which may contribute to its protective effects against oxidative stress-related diseases.
- Anti-inflammatory effects: The plant has been shown to possess anti-inflammatory properties, potentially explaining its use in traditional medicine for conditions like arthritis and respiratory ailments.
- Antimicrobial activity: Studies have investigated the antimicrobial activity of Solanum trilobatum against various bacteria and fungi.
- Anticancer effects: Some research has explored the potential anticancer effects of the plant, including its ability to inhibit tumor growth and metastasis.
- Hepatoprotective effects: Solanum trilobatum has been studied for its potential to protect the liver from damage caused by toxins or diseases.
