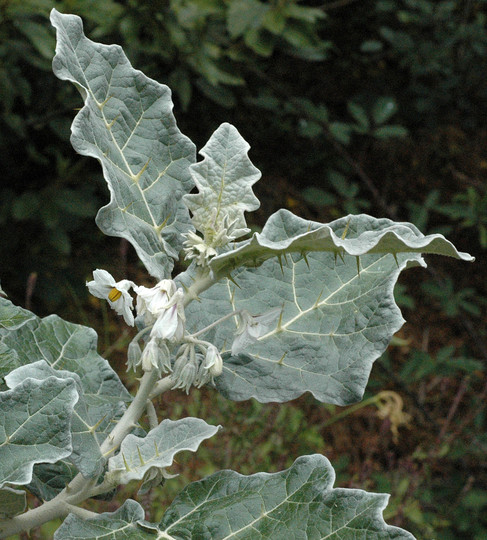

Scientific classification
- Kingdom: Plantae
- Clade: Tracheophytes
- Clade: Angiosperms
- Clade: Eudicots
- Clade: Asterids
- Order: Solanales
- Family: Solanaceae
- Genus: Solanum
- Species: S. marginatum

Binomial name
- Solanum marginatum L.f.

Synonyms
- Solanum abyssinicum

= Solanum marginatum =

Species of flowering plant

Solanum marginatum is a species of plant in the family Solanaceae known by the common names purple African nightshade and white-margined nightshade. It is native to Ethiopia and Eritrea, and it is known on other continents as an introduced species and sometimes a weed. It is a hairy shrub growing up to two meters tall. The large, distinctive, gray-green leaves are wavy along the edges, woolly on the undersides, and measure up to 18 centimeters long. The veins are white and lined with large, widely spaced prickles. The inflorescence contains several white flowers, hanging or nodding bisexual flowers and erect staminate flowers with large yellow anthers. The fruit is a yellow berry up to 5 centimeters wide.

This is one of several Solanum species that contain solasodine.
