= Solanum cardiophyllum =

Scientific classification
- Kingdom: Plantae
- Clade: Tracheophytes
- Clade: Angiosperms
- Clade: Eudicots
- Clade: Asterids
- Order: Solanales
- Family: Solanaceae
- Genus: Solanum
- Species: S. cardiophyllum

Binomial name
- Solanum cardiophyllum John Lindley

Species of flowering plant

Solanum cardiophyllum, known as cimatli, the heartleaf horsenettle or heartleaf nightshade, is a North American species, found primarily in Mexico. It is also present in some parts of the SW United States, but was probably introduced. This is one of the few wild potato species that was commonly used as food. The Aztec and the Chichimeca ate S. cardiophyllum and the practice continues in some parts of Mexico today. There was at least one farm that was growing S. cardiophyllum, S. ehrenbergii, and S. stoloniferum for market in Jalisco as recently as 2010.

It is listed as an invasive weed in some parts of the US.

== Description ==
Plants can reach a little over two feet in height, although many are much smaller in the wild. Although S. cardiophyllum has small tubers, reaching about an inch in diameter, they compensate with a rare trait in wild potatoes: palatability. The flavor is not easily distinguishable from domesticated potatoes. The level of glykoalkaloids in some accessions of this species is sometimes very low, about 2mg / 100g.
