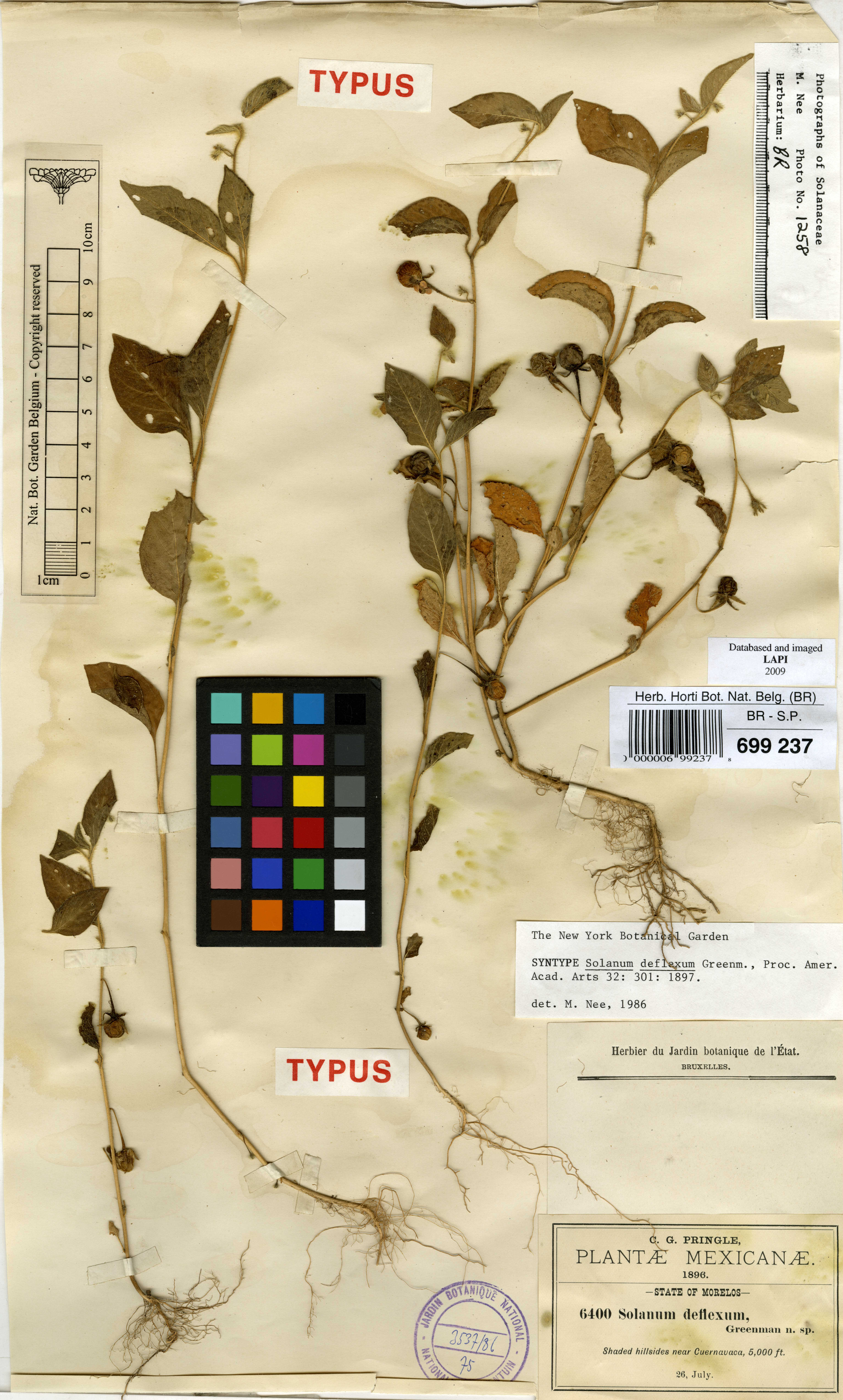

Scientific classification
- Kingdom: Plantae
- Clade: Tracheophytes
- Clade: Angiosperms
- Clade: Eudicots
- Clade: Asterids
- Order: Solanales
- Family: Solanaceae
- Genus: Solanum
- Species: S. adscendens

Binomial name
- Solanum adscendens Sendtner

= Solanum adscendens =

Species of plant

Solanum adscendens, the sonoita nightshade, is a plant native to the Americas. It has been found in Mexico, Costa Rica, El Salvador, Guatemala, Honduras, Nicaragua, Bolivia, Colombia, Ecuador, Paraguay, Corrientes in Argentina, Bahia and Rio Grande do Sul in Brazil, and Texas and Arizona in the United States. In addition, this plant has also been naturalized in parts of Africa.

S. adscendens is a predominantly selfing species with very small white flowers that mature into fruits that disperse their seeds by exploding.
