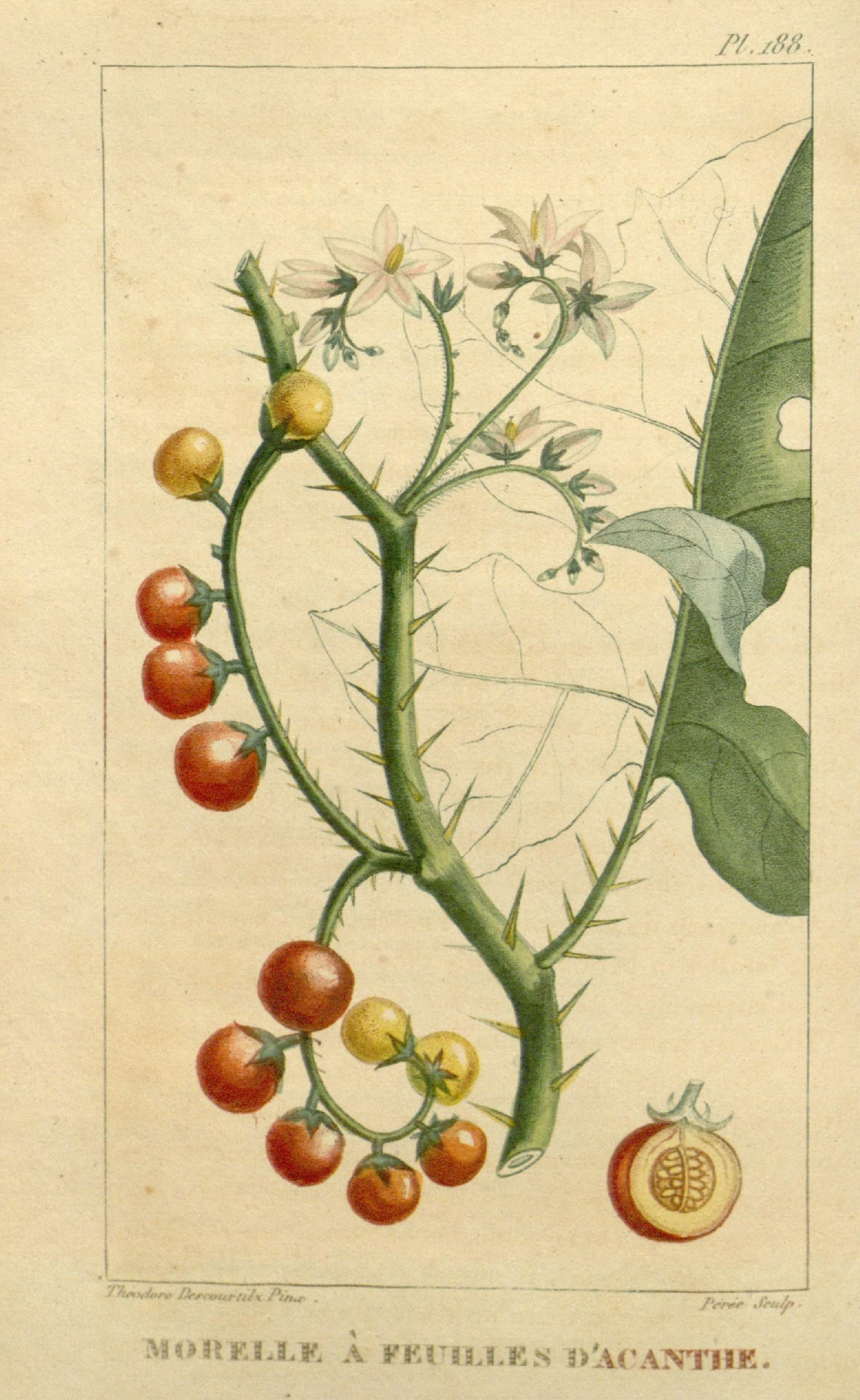

Scientific classification
- Kingdom: Plantae
- Clade: Tracheophytes
- Clade: Angiosperms
- Clade: Eudicots
- Clade: Asterids
- Order: Solanales
- Family: Solanaceae
- Genus: Solanum
- Species: S. campechiense

Binomial name
- Solanum campechiense L.

= Solanum campechiense =

Species of flowering plant

Solanum campechiense, the redberry nightshade, is a plant in the family Solanaceae.
