= Solanum chrysophyllum =

Conservation status
- Data Deficient (IUCN 3.1)

Scientific classification
- Kingdom: Plantae
- Clade: Tracheophytes
- Clade: Angiosperms
- Clade: Eudicots
- Clade: Asterids
- Order: Solanales
- Family: Solanaceae
- Genus: Solanum
- Species: S. chrysophyllum

Binomial name
- Solanum chrysophyllum Dunal

Species of flowering plant

Solanum chrysophyllum is a flowering plant species in the nightshade family (Solanaceae). It probably belongs to a group of species formerly in Solanum but nowadays placed in Lycianthes, though its exact identity and name remain undetermined.

It is endemic to Ecuador. Its status is insufficiently known.
