= Solanum pinnatisectum =

Scientific classification
- Kingdom: Plantae
- Clade: Tracheophytes
- Clade: Angiosperms
- Clade: Eudicots
- Clade: Asterids
- Order: Solanales
- Family: Solanaceae
- Genus: Solanum
- Species: S. pinnatisectum

Binomial name
- Solanum pinnatisectum Dunal

Synonyms
- Solanum pinnatisectum var. heptazygum Bitter; Solanum pinnatisectum var. pentazygum Bitter

Species of plant in the nightshade family

Solanum pinnatisectum, the tansy-leaf nightshade or tansyleaf nightshade, is a species of flowering plant in the family Solanaceae, native to Arizona in the United States, and to Mexico. A wild potato, it is being extensively studied for its resistance to Phytophthora infestans (the cause of late potato blight), in an effort to improve the domestic potato Solanum tuberosum.
