= Potato bush =

Potato bush is a common name for several species of plants and may refer to:

- Solanum ellipticum, a small fast-growing waxy-looking shrub that grows next to creeks
- Solanum esuriale, a species of perennial herbaceous plant native to Australia
