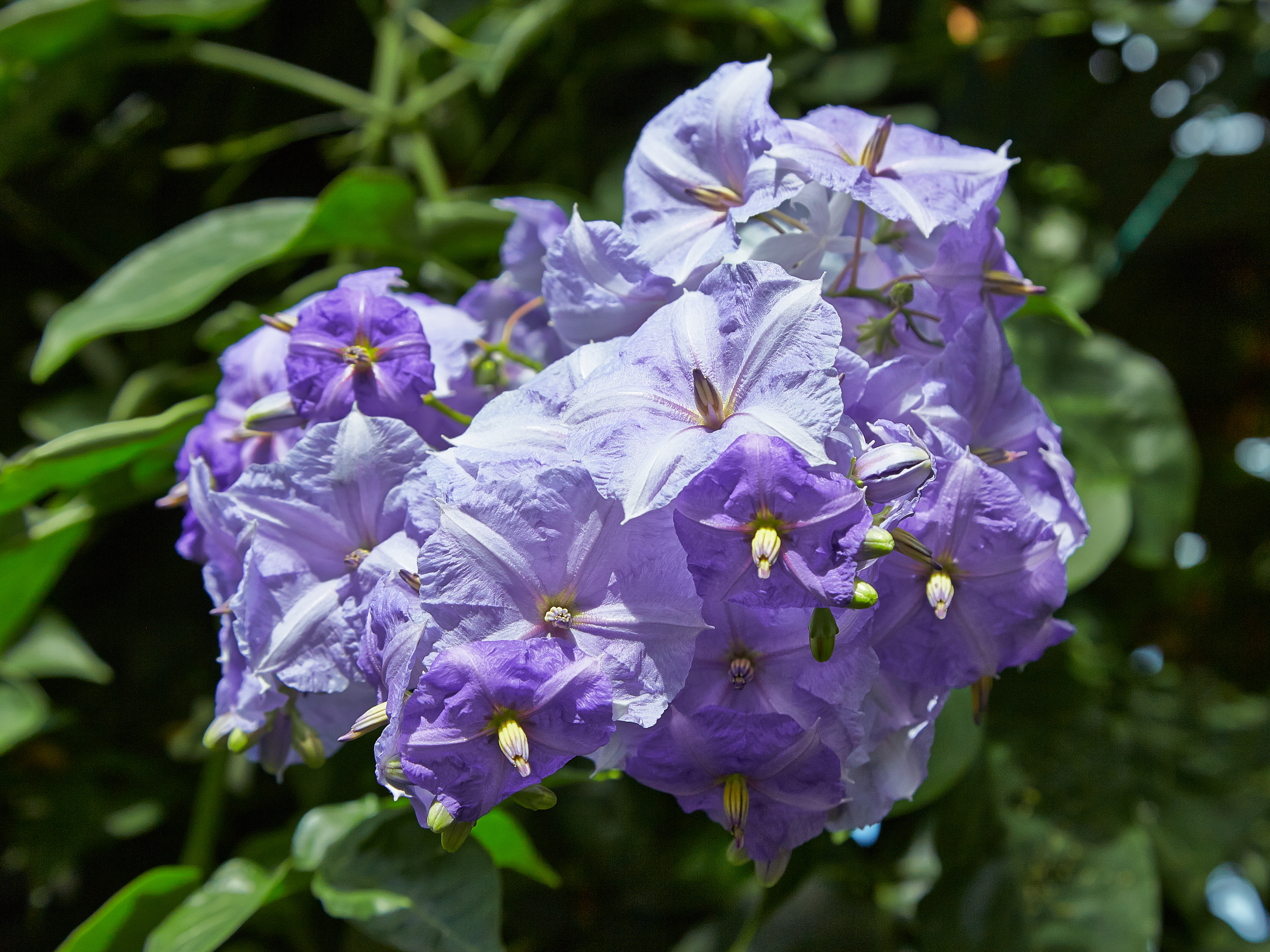
- Flowers
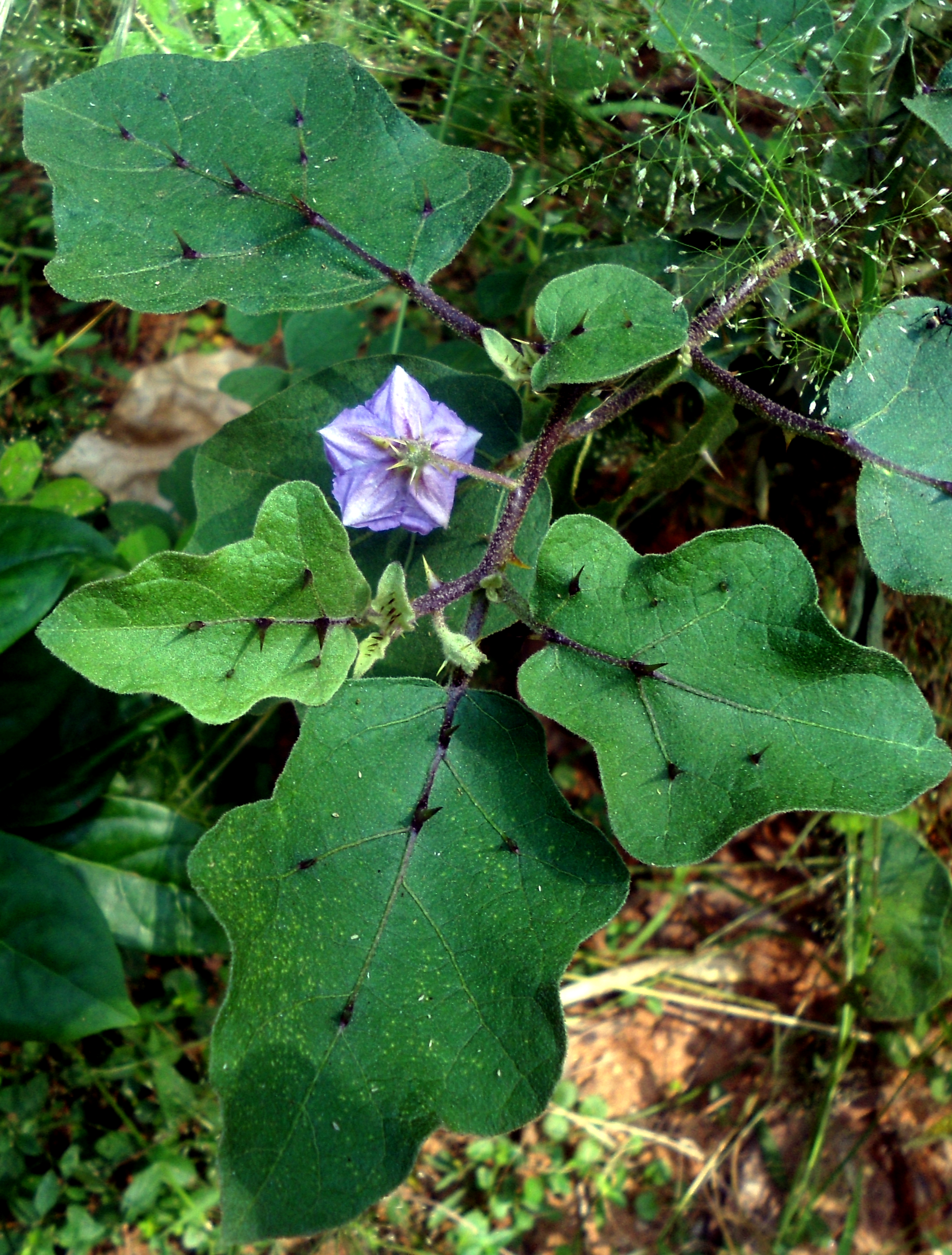
- Leaves

Scientific classification
- Kingdom: Plantae
- Clade: Tracheophytes
- Clade: Angiosperms
- Clade: Eudicots
- Clade: Asterids
- Order: Solanales
- Family: Solanaceae
- Genus: Solanum
- Species: S. wendlandii

Binomial name
- Solanum wendlandii Hook.f.

Synonyms
- Solanum mazatenangense J.M.Coult.; Solanum mazatenangense J.M.Coult. & Donn.Sm.; Solanum tlacotalpense Sessé & Moc.; Solanum unguis-cati Standl.

= Solanum wendlandii =

Species of plant in the nightshade family

Solanum wendlandii, the giant potato creeper, potato vine, Costa Rican nightshade, divorce vine, or paradise flower, is a species of flowering plant in the family Solanaceae. It is native to Mexico, Central America, and northwest South America, and has been widely introduced as an ornamental to other tropical locales, including the Caribbean, Africa, Nepal, Java, and many islands in the Indian and Pacific Oceans. A robust vine reaching 15 ft (4.6 m), its long-lasting dark purple flowers eventually fade to white.
