= List of Solanales of South Africa =

Flowering plants in the order Solanales recorded from South Africa

Solanales is an order of flowering plants, included in the asterid group of dicotyledons. The anthophytes are a grouping of plant taxa bearing flower-like reproductive structures. They were formerly thought to be a clade comprising plants bearing flower-like structures. The group contained the angiosperms - the extant flowering plants, such as roses and grasses - as well as the Gnetales and the extinct Bennettitales.

23,420 species of vascular plant have been recorded in South Africa, making it the sixth most species-rich country in the world and the most species-rich country on the African continent. Of these, 153 species are considered to be threatened. Nine biomes have been described in South Africa: Fynbos, Succulent Karoo, desert, Nama Karoo, grassland, savanna, Albany thickets, the Indian Ocean coastal belt, and forests.

The 2018 South African National Biodiversity Institute's National Biodiversity Assessment plant checklist lists 35,130 taxa in the phyla Anthocerotophyta (hornworts (6)), Anthophyta (flowering plants (33534)), Bryophyta (mosses (685)), Cycadophyta (cycads (42)), Lycopodiophyta (Lycophytes(45)), Marchantiophyta (liverworts (376)), Pinophyta (conifers (33)), and Pteridophyta (cryptogams (408)).

Four families are represented in the literature. Listed taxa include species, subspecies, varieties, and forms as recorded, some of which have subsequently been allocated to other taxa as synonyms, in which cases the accepted taxon is appended to the listing. Multiple entries under alternative names reflect taxonomic revision over time.

== Convolvulaceae ==
- Family: Convolvulaceae,

=== Astripomoea ===
Genus Astripomoea:

- Astripomoea malvacea (Klotzsch) A.Meeuse, indigenous
  - Astripomoea malvacea (Klotzsch) A.Meeuse var. malvacea, indigenous
- Astrochlaena rotundata Pilg. accepted as Astripomoea rotundata (Pilg.) A.Meeuse

=== Bonamia ===
Genus Bonamia:

- Bonamia schizantha (Hallier f.) A.Meeuse, accepted as Seddera schizantha Hallier f.
- Bonamia velutina Verdc. indigenous

=== Calystegia ===
Genus Calystegia:

- Calystegia sepium (L.) R.Br. not indigenous, naturalised
- Calystegia soldanella (L.) R.Br. ex Roem. & Schult. not indigenous, naturalised

=== Convolvulus ===
Genus Convolvulus:

- Convolvulus arvensis L. not indigenous, naturalised, invasive
- Convolvulus aschersonii Engl. indigenous
- Convolvulus bidentatus Bernh. ex C.Krauss, endemic
- Convolvulus boedeckerianus Peter, endemic
- Convolvulus capensis Burm.f. endemic
- Convolvulus capensis Burm.f. var. bowieanus (Rendle) A.Meeuse, accepted as Convolvulus capensis Burm.f. present
- Convolvulus capensis Burm.f. var. plicatus (Desr.) Baker, accepted as Convolvulus capensis Burm.f. present
- Convolvulus dregeanus Choisy, endemic
- Convolvulus farinosus L. indigenous
- Convolvulus galpinii C.H.Wright, endemic
- Convolvulus indicus Burm.f. accepted as Ipomoea indica (Burm.f.) Merr. present
- Convolvulus malabaricus L. accepted as Hewittia malabarica (L.) Suresh, present
- Convolvulus multifidus Thunb. endemic
- Convolvulus natalensis Bernh. ex Krauss, indigenous
  - Convolvulus natalensis Bernh. ex Krauss var. transvaalensis (Schltr.) A.Meeuse, accepted as Convolvulus natalensis Bernh. ex Krauss, present
- Convolvulus ocellatus Hook.f. indigenous
  - Convolvulus ocellatus Hook.f. var. ocellatus, indigenous
  - Convolvulus ocellatus Hook.f. var. ornatus (Engl.) A.Meeuse, accepted as Convolvulus ocellatus Hook.f. var. ocellatus, present
- Convolvulus sagittatus Thunb. indigenous
  - Convolvulus sagittatus Thunb. subsp. grandiflorus (Hallier f.) A.Meeuse var. graminifolius, accepted as Convolvulus sagittatus Thunb. present
  - Convolvulus sagittatus Thunb. subsp. grandiflorus (Hallier f.) A.Meeuse var. grandiflorus, accepted as Convolvulus sagittatus Thunb.
  - Convolvulus sagittatus Thunb. subsp. grandiflorus (Hallier f.) A.Meeuse var. linearifolius, accepted as Convolvulus sagittatus Thunb. present
  - Convolvulus sagittatus Thunb. subsp. sagittatus var. hirtellus, accepted as Convolvulus sagittatus Thunb. present
  - Convolvulus sagittatus Thunb. subsp. sagittatus var. namaquensis, accepted as Convolvulus sagittatus Thunb. present
  - Convolvulus sagittatus Thunb. subsp. sagittatus var. phyllosepalus, accepted as Convolvulus sagittatus Thunb. present
  - Convolvulus sagittatus Thunb. subsp. sagittatus var. ulosepalus, accepted as Convolvulus sagittatus Thunb. present
  - Convolvulus sagittatus Thunb. var. aschersonii (Engl.) Verdc. accepted as Convolvulus aschersonii Engl. present
- Convolvulus sublobatus L.f. accepted as Hewittia malabarica (L.) Suresh, present
- Convolvulus thunbergii Roem. & Schult. indigenous

=== Cuscuta ===
Genus Cuscuta:

- Cuscuta africana Willd. endemic
- Cuscuta angulata Engelm. endemic
- Cuscuta appendiculata Engelm. endemic
- Cuscuta australis R.Br. indigenous
- Cuscuta bifurcata Yunck. endemic
- Cuscuta campestris Yunck. not indigenous, naturalised, invasive
- Cuscuta cassytoides Engelm. indigenous
- Cuscuta epithymum Murray, not indigenous, naturalised
- Cuscuta gerrardii Baker, endemic
- Cuscuta hyalina Roth, indigenous
- Cuscuta kilimanjari Oliv. indigenous
  - Cuscuta kilimanjari Oliv. var. kilimanjari, indigenous
- Cuscuta natalensis Baker, endemic
- Cuscuta nitida Choisy, endemic
- Cuscuta planiflora Ten. indigenous
  - Cuscuta planiflora Ten. var. madagascarensis (Yunck.) Verdc. indigenous
  - Cuscuta planiflora Ten. var. planiflora, indigenous
- Cuscuta suaveolens Ser. not indigenous, naturalised, invasive

=== Dichondra ===
Genus Dichondra:

- Dichondra micrantha Urb. not indigenous, naturalised

=== Evolvulus ===
Genus Evolvulus :

- Evolvulus alsinoides (L.) L. indigenous
  - Evolvulus alsinoides (L.) L. var. linifolius (L.) Baker, accepted as Evolvulus alsinoides (L.) L. present
- Evolvulus nummularius (L.) L. indigenous

=== Falkia ===
Genus Falkia:

- Falkia oblonga Bernh. ex C.Krauss, indigenous
- Falkia repens Thunb. endemic

=== Hewittia ===
Genus Hewittia:

- Hewittia malabarica (L.) Suresh, indigenous
- Hewittia sublobata (L.f.) Kuntze, accepted as Hewittia malabarica (L.) Suresh, present

=== Ipomoea ===
Genus Ipomoea:

- Ipomoea adenioides Schinz, indigenous
  - Ipomoea adenioides Schinz var. adenioides, indigenous
- Ipomoea alba L. not indigenous, naturalised, invasive
- Ipomoea albivenia (Lindl.) Sweet, indigenous
- Ipomoea aquatica Forssk. indigenous
- Ipomoea arachnosperma Welw. accepted as Ipomoea dichroa Choisy, present
- Ipomoea atherstonei Baker, accepted as Ipomoea oblongata E.Mey. ex Choisy, present
- Ipomoea bathycolpos Hallier f. endemic
  - Ipomoea bathycolpos Hallier f. var. sinuatodentata Hallier f. accepted as Ipomoea bathycolpos Hallier f. present
- Ipomoea bisavium A.Meeuse, endemic
- Ipomoea bolusiana Schinz, indigenous
  - Ipomoea bolusiana Schinz var. pinnatipartita Verdc. accepted as Ipomoea bolusiana Schinz, present
- Ipomoea cairica (L.) Sweet, indigenous
  - Ipomoea cairica (L.) Sweet var. cairica, indigenous
- Ipomoea carnea Jacq. subsp. fistulosa (Mart. ex Choisy) D.F.Austin, not indigenous, naturalised, invasive
- Ipomoea chloroneura Hallier f. indigenous
- Ipomoea congesta R.Br. accepted as Ipomoea indica (Burm.f.) Merr. present
- Ipomoea consimilis Schulze-Menz, indigenous
- Ipomoea coptica (L.) Roth ex Roem. & Schult. indigenous
- Ipomoea coscinosperma Hochst. ex Choisy, indigenous
- Ipomoea crassipes Hook. indigenous
  - Ipomoea crassipes Hook. var. crassipes, indigenous
- Ipomoea crispa (Thunb.) Hallier f. endemic
- Ipomoea dichroa Choisy, indigenous
- Ipomoea eriocarpa R.Br. indigenous
- Ipomoea ficifolia Lindl. indigenous
- Ipomoea fistulosa Mart. ex Choisy, accepted as Ipomoea carnea Jacq. subsp. fistulosa (Mart. ex Choisy) D.F.Austin, not indigenous, naturalised
- Ipomoea gracilisepala Rendle, indigenous
- Ipomoea hackeliana (Schinz) Hallier f. indigenous
- Ipomoea hederifolia L. not indigenous, cultivated, naturalised, invasive
- Ipomoea hochstetteri House, indigenous
- Ipomoea holubii Baker, indigenous
- Ipomoea indica (Burm.f.) Merr. not indigenous, naturalised, invasive
- Ipomoea involucrata P.Beauv. indigenous
  - Ipomoea involucrata P.Beauv. var. involucrata, indigenous
- Ipomoea lapathifolia Hallier f. indigenous
  - Ipomoea lapathifolia Hallier f. var. lapathifolia, indigenous
- Ipomoea magnusiana Schinz, indigenous
  - Ipomoea magnusiana Schinz var. eenii (Rendle) A.Meeuse, accepted as Ipomoea magnusiana Schinz, present
- Ipomoea mauritiana Jacq. indigenous
- Ipomoea nil (L.) Roth, not indigenous, naturalised
- Ipomoea oblongata E.Mey. ex Choisy, indigenous
- Ipomoea obscura (L.) Ker Gawl. indigenous
  - Ipomoea obscura (L.) Ker Gawl. var. fragilis (Choisy) A.Meeuse, accepted as Ipomoea obscura (L.) Ker Gawl. var. obscura, present
- Ipomoea obscura (L.) Ker Gawl. var. obscura, indigenous
- Ipomoea oenotherae (Vatke) Hallier f. indigenous
  - Ipomoea oenotherae (Vatke) Hallier f. var. oenotherae, indigenous
- Ipomoea oenotheroides (L.f.) Raf. ex Hallier f. indigenous
- Ipomoea ommanneyi Rendle, indigenous
- Ipomoea papilio Hallier f. indigenous
- Ipomoea pellita Hallier f. indigenous
- Ipomoea pes-caprae (L.) R.Br. indigenous
  - Ipomoea pes-caprae (L.) R.Br. subsp. brasiliensis (L.) Ooststr. indigenous
- Ipomoea pes-tigridis L. indigenous
  - Ipomoea pes-tigridis L. var. pes-tigridis, indigenous
- Ipomoea pileata Roxb. indigenous
- Ipomoea plebeia R.Br. indigenous
  - Ipomoea plebeia R.Br. subsp. africana A.Meeuse, indigenous
- Ipomoea purpurea (L.) Roth, not indigenous, naturalised, invasive
- Ipomoea quinquefolia Hochst. ex Hallier f. var. purpurea Hallier f. accepted as Ipomoea hochstetteri House
- Ipomoea robertsiana Rendle, endemic
- Ipomoea shirambensis Baker, indigenous
- Ipomoea simplex Thunb. indigenous
- Ipomoea sinensis (Desr.) Choisy, indigenous
  - Ipomoea sinensis (Desr.) Choisy subsp. blepharosepala (Hochst. ex A.Rich.) Verdc. ex A.Meeuse, indigenous
- Ipomoea stenosiphon Hallier f. indigenous
- Ipomoea suffruticosa Burch. indigenous
- Ipomoea tenuipes Verdc. indigenous
- Ipomoea transvaalensis A.Meeuse, indigenous
- Ipomoea wightii (Wall.) Choisy, indigenous
  - Ipomoea wightii (Wall.) Choisy var. wightii, indigenous
- Ipomoea woodii N.E.Br. accepted as Stictocardia laxiflora (Baker) Hallier f. present

=== Jacquemontia ===
Genus Jacquemontia:

- Jacquemontia tamnifolia (L.) Griseb. indigenous

=== Merremia ===
Genus Merremia:

- Merremia kentrocaulos (C.B.Clarke) Rendle, indigenous
- Merremia malvaefolia Rendle, endemic
- Merremia palmata Hallier f. indigenous
- Merremia pinnata (Hochst. ex Choisy) Hallier f. indigenous
- Merremia pterygocaulos (Choisy) Hallier f. indigenous
- Merremia tridentata (L.) Hallier f. subsp. angustifolia (Jacq.) Ooststr. var. angustifolia, accepted as Xenostegia tridentata (L.) D.F.Austin & Staples subsp. angustifolia (Jacq.) Lejoly & Lisowski, present
- Merremia verecunda Rendle, indigenous

=== Paralepistemon ===
Genus Paralepistemon:

- Paralepistemon shirensis (Oliv.) Lejoly & Lisowski, indigenous

=== Poranopsis ===
Genus Poranopsis:

- Poranopsis paniculata (Roxb.) Roberty, not indigenous, cultivated, naturalised

=== Seddera ===
Genus Seddera:

- Seddera capensis (E.Mey. ex Choisy) Hallier f. indigenous
- Seddera suffruticosa (Schinz) Hallier f. indigenous

=== Stictocardia ===
Genus Stictocardia:

- Stictocardia laxiflora (Baker) Hallier f. indigenous
  - Stictocardia laxiflora (Baker) Hallier f. var. woodii (N.E.Br.) Verdc. accepted as Stictocardia laxiflora (Baker) Hallier f. present
- Stictocardia woodii (N.E.Br.) Hallier f. accepted as Stictocardia laxiflora (Baker) Hallier f. present

=== Turbina ===
Genus Turbina:

- Turbina holubii (Baker) A.Meeuse, accepted as Ipomoea holubii Baker, present
- Turbina oblongata (E.Mey. ex Choisy) A.Meeuse, accepted as Ipomoea oblongata E.Mey. ex Choisy, present
- Turbina oenotheroides (L.f.) A.Meeuse, accepted as Ipomoea oenotheroides (L.f.) Raf. ex Hallier f. present
- Turbina robertsiana (Rendle) A.Meeuse, accepted as Ipomoea robertsiana Rendle, present
- Turbina shirensis (Oliv.) A.Meeuse, accepted as Paralepistemon shirensis (Oliv.) Lejoly & Lisowski, present
- Turbina stenosiphon (Hallier f.) A.Meeuse, accepted as Ipomoea stenosiphon Hallier f. present
- Turbina suffruticosa (Burch.) A.Meeuse, accepted as Ipomoea suffruticosa Burch. present

=== Xenostegia ===
Genus Xenostegia:

- Xenostegia tridentata (L.) D.F.Austin & Staples, indigenous
  - Xenostegia tridentata (L.) D.F.Austin & Staples subsp. angustifolia (Jacq.) Lejoly & Lisowski, indigenous

== Montiniaceae ==
Family: Montiniaceae,

=== Montinia ===
Genus Montinia:

- Montinia caryophyllacea Thunb. indigenous

== Solanaceae ==
Family: Solanaceae,

=== Atropa ===
Genus Atropa:

- Atropa solanacea L. accepted as Solanum guineense L. indigenous

=== Brugmansia ===
Genus Brugmansia:

- Brugmansia arborea (L.) Lagerh. not indigenous, cultivated, naturalised

=== Capsicum ===
Genus Capsicum:

- Capsicum annuum L. not indigenous, naturalised
  - Capsicum annuum L. var. aviculare (Dierb.) D'Arcy & Eshbaugh, accepted as Capsicum annuum L. var. glabriusculum (Dunal) Heiser & Pickersgill, not indigenous, cultivated
  - Capsicum annuum L. var. glabriusculum (Dunal) Heiser & Pickersgill, not indigenous, naturalised
- Capsicum frutescens L. not indigenous, naturalised
- Capsicum hispidum Dunal var. glabriusculum Dunal, accepted as Capsicum annuum L. var. glabriusculum (Dunal) Heiser & Pickersgill, unconfirmed
- Capsicum indicum Dierb. var. aviculare Dierb. accepted as Capsicum annuum L. var. glabriusculum (Dunal) Heiser & Pickersgill

=== Cestrum ===
Genus Cestrum:

- Cestrum aurantiacum Lindl. not indigenous, naturalised, invasive
- Cestrum elegans (Brongn.) Schltdl. not indigenous, naturalised, invasive
- Cestrum laevigatum Schltdl. not indigenous, naturalised, invasive
- Cestrum parqui L'Her. not indigenous, naturalised, invasive

=== Cyphomandra ===
Genus Cyphomandra:

- Cyphomandra betacea (Cav.) Sendtn. accepted as Solanum betaceum Cav. not indigenous, naturalised
- Cyphomandra sp. accepted as Solanum sp.

=== Datura ===
Genus Datura:

- Datura ferox L. not indigenous, naturalised, invasive
- Datura innoxia Mill. accepted as Datura innoxia Mill. not indigenous, naturalised, invasive
- Datura innoxia Mill. not indigenous, naturalised
- Datura metel L. not indigenous, naturalised
- Datura stramonium L. not indigenous, naturalised, invasive

=== Lycium ===
Genus Lycium:

- Lycium acutifolium E.Mey. ex Dunal, endemic
- Lycium afrum L. endemic
- Lycium amoenum Dammer, indigenous
- Lycium arenicola Miers, indigenous
- Lycium bosciifolium Schinz, indigenous
- Lycium cinereum Thunb. indigenous
- Lycium cordatum Mill. accepted as Carissa bispinosa (L.) Desf. ex Brenan, indigenous
- Lycium ferocissimum Miers, indigenous
- Lycium gariepense A.M.Venter, indigenous
- Lycium grandicalyx Joubert & Venter, indigenous
- Lycium hantamense A.M.Venter, indigenous
- Lycium hirsutum Dunal, indigenous
- Lycium horridum Thunb. indigenous
- Lycium mascarenense A.M.Venter & A.J.Scott, indigenous
- Lycium oxycarpum Dunal, endemic
- Lycium pilifolium C.H.Wright, indigenous
- Lycium prunus-spinosa Dunal, accepted as Lycium cinereum Thunb. present
- Lycium pumilum Dammer, indigenous
- Lycium schizocalyx C.H.Wright, indigenous
- Lycium shawii Roem. & Schult. indigenous
- Lycium strandveldense A.M.Venter, indigenous
- Lycium tenue Willd. endemic
- Lycium tetrandrum Thunb. indigenous
- Lycium villosum Schinz, indigenous

=== Nicandra ===
Genus Nicandra:

- Nicandra physalodes (L.) Gaertn. not indigenous, naturalised, invasive

=== Nicotiana ===
Genus Nicotiana:

- Nicotiana glauca Graham, not indigenous, naturalised, invasive
- Nicotiana longiflora Cav. not indigenous, naturalised
- Nicotiana tabacum L. not indigenous, naturalised

=== Nierembergia ===
Genus Nierembergia:

- Nierembergia hippomanica Miers var. glabriuscula Dunal, accepted as Nierembergia hippomanica Miers var. violacea Millan, cultivated
  - Nierembergia hippomanica Miers var. violacea Millan, not indigenous, naturalised
- Nierembergia linariifolia Graham var. glabriuscula (Dunal) Cocucci & Hunz. accepted as Nierembergia hippomanica Miers var. violacea Millan, not indigenous, naturalised

=== Physalis ===
Genus Physalis:

- Physalis angulata L. not indigenous, naturalised, invasive
- Physalis minima L. not indigenous, naturalised
- Physalis peruviana L. not indigenous, cultivated, naturalised, invasive
- Physalis philadelphica Lam. not indigenous, naturalised
- Physalis viscosa L. not indigenous, naturalised, invasive

=== Salpichroa ===
Genus Salpichroa:

- Salpichroa origanifolia (Lam.) Baill. not indigenous, cultivated, naturalised

=== Solanum ===
Genus Solanum:

- Solanum acanthoideum Drege ex Dunal, accepted as Solanum dasyphyllum Schumach. & Thonn. indigenous
- Solanum aculeastrum Dunal, indigenous
- Solanum aculeatissimum Jacq. not indigenous, naturalised
- Solanum africanum Mill. endemic
- Solanum aggerum Dunal, accepted as Solanum africanum Mill. indigenous
- Solanum aggregatum Jacq. accepted as Solanum guineense L. indigenous
  - Solanum aggregatum Jacq. var. bachmannii (Dammer) Bitter, accepted as Solanum guineense L. indigenous
- Solanum albotomentosum C.H.Wright, accepted as Solanum catombelense Peyr.
- Solanum americanum Mill. not indigenous, naturalised, invasive
- Solanum anguivi Lam. indigenous
- Solanum aranoideum Dammer, accepted as Solanum supinum Dunal
- Solanum auriculatum Aiton, accepted as Solanum mauritianum Scop.
- Solanum bachmannii Dammer, accepted as Solanum guineense L. indigenous
- Solanum bansoense Dammer subsp. sanaganum Bitter, accepted as Solanum terminale Forssk.
- Solanum betaceum Cav. not indigenous, naturalised, invasive
- Solanum bifurcatum Hochst. ex A.Rich. accepted as Solanum terminale Forssk.
- Solanum bifurcum Hochst. ex Dunal, accepted as Solanum terminale Forssk.
- Solanum bojeri Dunal, accepted as Solanum campylacanthum Hochst. ex A.Rich.
- Solanum bracteatum Thunb. accepted as Solanum africanum Mill. indigenous
- Solanum burbankii Bitter, accepted as Solanum retroflexum Dunal, indigenous
- Solanum burchellii Dunal, indigenous
- Solanum campylacanthum Hochst. ex A.Rich. indigenous
  - Solanum campylacanthum Hochst. ex A.Rich. subsp. panduriforme (Drege ex Dunal) J.Samuels, accepted as Solanum campylacanthum Hochst. ex A.Rich. indigenous
- Solanum capense L. indigenous
  - Solanum capense L. subsp. quercilobum Bitter, accepted as Solanum capense L.
  - Solanum capense L. var. evectistellatum Bitter, accepted as Solanum capense L. indigenous
  - Solanum capense L. var. sodomaeodes (Kuntze) Bitter, accepted as Solanum sodomaeodes Kuntze, indigenous
  - Solanum capense L. var. tomentosum C.H.Wright, accepted as Solanum capense L. indigenous
  - Solanum capense L. var. uniradiatum Bitter, accepted as Solanum sodomaeodes Kuntze, indigenous
  - Solanum capense L. var. wilmsii (Dammer) Bitter, accepted as Solanum sodomaeodes Kuntze, indigenous
- Solanum capsicoides All. not indigenous, naturalised
- Solanum catombelense Peyr. indigenous
- Solanum chenopodioides Lam. not indigenous, naturalised, invasive
- Solanum chondropetalum Dammer, accepted as Solanum tettense Klotzsch
- Solanum chrysotrichum Schltdl. not indigenous, naturalised, invasive
- Solanum ciliatum Lam. accepted as Solanum capsicoides All. not indigenous
- Solanum coccineum Jacq. accepted as Solanum tomentosum L. indigenous
- Solanum crassifolium Lam. accepted as Solanum africanum Mill. indigenous
- Solanum damarense Bitter, accepted as Solanum humile Lam.
- Solanum dasyphyllum Schumach. & Thonn. indigenous
- Solanum dasyphyllum Schumach. & Thonn. var. natalense Bitter, accepted as Solanum dasyphyllum Schumach. & Thonn. indigenous
- Solanum dasypodum St.-Lag. accepted as Solanum guineense L. indigenous
- Solanum dasypus Drege ex Dunal, accepted as Solanum guineense L. indigenous
- Solanum dasypus E.Mey. accepted as Solanum guineense L. indigenous
- Solanum delagoense Dunal, accepted as Solanum campylacanthum Hochst. ex A.Rich. indigenous
  - Solanum delagoense Dunal subsp. transvaalense Bitter, accepted as Solanum campylacanthum Hochst. ex A.Rich. indigenous
- Solanum denudatum Bitter, accepted as Solanum humile Lam.
- Solanum didymanthum Dunal, accepted as Solanum rubetorum Dunal, indigenous
  - Solanum didymanthum Dunal var. plurifolium Dunal, accepted as Solanum rubetorum Dunal, indigenous
  - Solanum didymanthum Dunal var. spinosa C.H.Wright, accepted as Solanum rubetorum Dunal, indigenous
- Solanum dinteri Bitter, accepted as Solanum capense L.
- Solanum diplocincinnum Dammer, accepted as Solanum tettense Klotzsch
- Solanum dregei Dunal, accepted as Solanum capense L.
- Solanum duplosinuatum Klotzsch, accepted as Solanum dasyphyllum Schumach. & Thonn.
- Solanum elaeagnifolium Cav. not indigenous, naturalised, invasive
- Solanum exasperatum Drege ex Dunal, accepted as Solanum africanum Mill. indigenous
- Solanum galpinii Bitter, accepted as Solanum rubetorum Dunal, indigenous
- Solanum geniculatum Drege ex Dunal, accepted as Solanum africanum Mill. indigenous
- Solanum giftbergense Dunal, accepted as Solanum humile Lam. indigenous
- Solanum giganteum Jacq. indigenous
- Solanum goetzei Dammer, indigenous
- Solanum gracile Dunal, accepted as Solanum chenopodioides Lam. not indigenous
- Solanum guineense L. endemic
- Solanum heterandrum Pursh, accepted as Solanum rostratum Dunal
- Solanum humile Lam. indigenous
- Solanum incanum L. subsp. horridescens Bitter, accepted as Solanum lichtensteinii Willd. indigenous
  - Solanum incanum L. var. lichtensteinii Bitter, accepted as Solanum lichtensteinii Willd. indigenous
  - Solanum incanum L. var. subexarmatum (Dunal) Bitter, accepted as Solanum lichtensteinii Willd. indigenous
- Solanum inconstans C.H.Wright, accepted as Solanum terminale Forssk.
- Solanum indicum L. var. suprastrigulosum Bitter, accepted as Solanum anguivi Lam. indigenous
- Solanum jasminoides Paxton, accepted as Solanum laxum Spreng. not indigenous, naturalised
- Solanum kibweziense Dammer, accepted as Solanum tettense Klotzsch
- Solanum koniortodes Dammer, accepted as Solanum tettense Klotzsch
- Solanum kwebense N.E.Br. ex C.H.Wright, accepted as Solanum tettense Klotzsch, indigenous
  - Solanum kwebense N.E.Br. ex C.H.Wright var. acutius Bitter, accepted as Solanum tettense Klotzsch
  - Solanum kwebense N.E.Br. ex C.H.Wright var. chondropetalum (Dammer) Bitter, accepted as Solanum tettense Klotzsch
  - Solanum kwebense N.E.Br. ex C.H.Wright var. luederitzii (Schinz) Bitter, accepted as Solanum tettense Klotzsch
  - Solanum kwebense N.E.Br. ex C.H.Wright var. majorifrons Bitter, accepted as Solanum tettense Klotzsch
- Solanum laciniatum Aiton, not indigenous, cultivated, naturalised, invasive
- Solanum laxum Spreng. not indigenous, naturalised
- Solanum leucophaeum Dunal, accepted as Solanum supinum Dunal, indigenous
- Solanum lichtensteinii Willd. indigenous
- Solanum linnaeanum Hepper & P.-M.L.Jaeger, indigenous
- Solanum litoraneum A.E.GonÃ§. indigenous
- Solanum longipes Dunal, accepted as Solanum africanum Mill. indigenous
- Solanum luederitzii Schinz, accepted as Solanum tettense Klotzsch
- Solanum lycopersicum L. not indigenous, cultivated, naturalised, invasive
  - Solanum lycopersicum L. var. cerasiforme (Alef.) Voss, accepted as Solanum lycopersicum L. not indigenous, cultivated, naturalised, invasive
- Solanum lyratifolium Dammer, accepted as Solanum supinum Dunal
- Solanum macowanii Fourc. accepted as Solanum capsicoides All. not indigenous
- Solanum macrocarpon L. not indigenous, cultivated
- Solanum mauritianum Scop. not indigenous, naturalised, invasive
- Solanum merkeri Dammer, accepted as Solanum campylacanthum Hochst. ex A.Rich.
- Solanum miniatum Bernh. ex Willd. accepted as Solanum villosum Mill. subsp. miniatum (Bernh. ex Willd.) Edmonds, not indigenous
- Solanum moestum Dunal, accepted as Solanum rubetorum Dunal, indigenous
- Solanum molle Burm.f. accepted as Solanum tomentosum L. indigenous
- Solanum monotanthum Dammer, accepted as Solanum zanzibarense Vatke
- Solanum monticolum Dunal, accepted as Solanum guineense L. indigenous
- Solanum multiglandulosum Bitter, accepted as Solanum humile Lam.
  - Solanum multiglandulosum Bitter var. multiarmatum Bitter, accepted as Solanum humile Lam.
- Solanum namaquense Dammer, accepted as Solanum capense L. indigenous
- Solanum nigrum L. not indigenous, naturalised
- Solanum niveum Vahl, accepted as Solanum giganteum Jacq. indigenous
- Solanum nodiflorum Jacq. accepted as Solanum americanum Mill. not indigenous
- Solanum omahekense Dammer, accepted as Solanum campylacanthum Hochst. ex A.Rich.
- Solanum omitiomirense Dammer, accepted as Solanum campylacanthum Hochst. ex A.Rich.
- Solanum panduriforme Drege ex Dunal, accepted as Solanum campylacanthum Hochst. ex A.Rich. indigenous
- Solanum pentheri Gand. accepted as Solanum campylacanthum Hochst. ex A.Rich. indigenous
- Solanum plousianthemum C.H.Wright var. rhodesianum (Dammer) Bitter, accepted as Solanum terminale Forssk.
- Solanum plousianthemum Dammer, accepted as Solanum terminale Forssk.
- Solanum pseudocapsicum L. not indigenous, naturalised, invasive
- Solanum pulverulentum L. accepted as Solanum tomentosum L.
- Solanum quadrangulare Thunb. ex L.f. accepted as Solanum africanum Mill. indigenous
  - Solanum quadrangulare Thunb. ex L.f. var. crassifolium (Lam.) Bitter, accepted as Solanum africanum Mill. indigenous
  - Solanum quadrangulare Thunb. ex L.f. var. glabrum Dammer, accepted as Solanum africanum Mill. indigenous
  - Solanum quadrangulare Thunb. ex L.f. var. integrifolium Dunal, accepted as Solanum africanum Mill. indigenous
  - Solanum quadrangulare Thunb. ex L.f. var. sinuato-angulatum Dunal, accepted as Solanum africanum Mill. indigenous
- Solanum rangei Dammer, accepted as Solanum burchellii Dunal
- Solanum rautanenii Schinz, accepted as Solanum catombelense Peyr.
- Solanum renschii Vatke, accepted as Solanum tettense Klotzsch, indigenous
- Solanum retroflexum Dunal, indigenous
- Solanum rhodesianum Dammer, accepted as Solanum terminale Forssk.
- Solanum rigescens Jacq. accepted as Solanum humile Lam. indigenous
  - Solanum rigescens Jacq. var. didymanthum (Dunal) Bitter, accepted as Solanum rubetorum Dunal, indigenous
  - Solanum rigescens Jacq. var. horridus Bitter, accepted as Solanum rubetorum Dunal, indigenous
  - Solanum rigescens Jacq. var. nanum Dunal, accepted as Solanum rubetorum Dunal, indigenous
  - Solanum rigescens Jacq. var. parvibaccatum Bitter, accepted as Solanum humile Lam. indigenous
  - Solanum rigescens Jacq. var. rubetorum (Dunal) Bitter, accepted as Solanum rubetorum Dunal, indigenous
- Solanum rigescentoides Hutch. accepted as Solanum humile Lam.
- Solanum rogersii S.Moore, accepted as Solanum sisymbriifolium Lam. not indigenous
- Solanum rostratum Dunal, not indigenous, naturalised
- Solanum rubetorum Dunal, endemic
- Solanum sarrachoides Sendtn. not indigenous, naturalised
- Solanum schaeferi Dammer, accepted as Solanum burchellii Dunal
- Solanum seaforthianum Andrews, not indigenous, naturalised, invasive
  - Solanum seaforthianum Andrews var. disjunctum O.E.Schulz, accepted as Solanum seaforthianum Andrews, not indigenous, naturalised
- Solanum sempervirens Mill. accepted as Solanum guineense L. indigenous
- Solanum sisymbriifolium Lam. not indigenous, naturalised, invasive
- Solanum sodomaeodes Kuntze, indigenous
- Solanum sparsiflorum Dammer, accepted as Solanum catombelense Peyr.
- Solanum subexarmatum Dunal, accepted as Solanum lichtensteinii Willd. indigenous
- Solanum subrectemunitum Bitter, accepted as Solanum humile Lam.
- Solanum supinum Dunal, indigenous
  - Solanum supinum Dunal var. aranoideum (Dammer) Bitter, accepted as Solanum supinum Dunal
  - Solanum supinum Dunal var. leucophaeum (Dunal) Bitter, accepted as Solanum supinum Dunal, endemic
  - Solanum supinum Dunal var. lyratifolium (Dammer) Bitter, accepted as Solanum supinum Dunal
  - Solanum supinum Dunal var. rehobothense Bitter, accepted as Solanum supinum Dunal
- Solanum tenuiramosum Dammer, accepted as Solanum tettense Klotzsch
- Solanum terminale Forssk. indigenous
  - Solanum terminale Forssk. subsp. inconstans (C.H.Wright) Heine, accepted as Solanum terminale Forssk.
  - Solanum terminale Forssk. subsp. sanaganum (Bitter) Heine, accepted as Solanum terminale Forssk.
- Solanum tettense Klotzsch, indigenous
  - Solanum tettense Klotzsch var. renschii (Vatke) A.E.GonÃ§. accepted as Solanum tettense Klotzsch, indigenous
- Solanum tomentosum L. indigenous
  - Solanum tomentosum L. subsp. pauciaculeolatum Bitter, accepted as Solanum rubetorum Dunal, indigenous
  - Solanum tomentosum L. var. brevifrons Bitter, accepted as Solanum tomentosum L. indigenous
  - Solanum tomentosum L. var. burchellii (Dunal) Wright, accepted as Solanum burchellii Dunal, indigenous
  - Solanum tomentosum L. var. coccineum (Jacq.) Willd. accepted as Solanum tomentosum L. endemic
  - Solanum tomentosum L. var. integrifolium Flanagan & Bitter, accepted as Solanum tomentosum L. indigenous
  - Solanum tomentosum L. var. longiarmatum Bitter, accepted as Solanum tomentosum L. indigenous
  - Solanum tomentosum L. var. megalocarpum Bitter, accepted as Solanum tomentosum L. indigenous
  - Solanum tomentosum L. var. mollissimum Bitter, accepted as Solanum tomentosum L. indigenous
  - Solanum tomentosum L. var. scabriusculum Bitter, accepted as Solanum tomentosum L. indigenous
  - Solanum tomentosum L. var. sublyratum Bitter, accepted as Solanum tomentosum L. indigenous
- Solanum torreanum A.E.GonÃ§. indigenous
- Solanum torvum Sw. not indigenous, naturalised
- Solanum triflorum Nutt. not indigenous, naturalised, invasive
- Solanum tuberosum L. not indigenous, naturalised
- Solanum umtuma Voronts. & S.Knapp, endemic
- Solanum upingtoniae Schinz, accepted as Solanum tettense Klotzsch
- Solanum urosepalum Dammer, accepted as Solanum rubetorum Dunal, indigenous
- Solanum usaramense Dammer, indigenous
- Solanum vagans C.H.Wright, accepted as Solanum zanzibarense Vatke, indigenous
- Solanum viarum Dunal, not indigenous, naturalised
- Solanum villosum Mill. not indigenous, naturalised
  - Solanum villosum Mill. subsp. miniatum (Bernh. ex Willd.) Edmonds, not indigenous, naturalised
  - Solanum villosum Mill. subsp. villosum, not indigenous, naturalised
- Solanum wilmsii Dammer, accepted as Solanum sodomaeodes Kuntze, indigenous
- Solanum zanzibarense Vatke, indigenous
  - Solanum zanzibarense Vatke var. vagans (C.H.Wright) Bitter, accepted as Solanum zanzibarense Vatke, indigenous

=== Withania ===
Genus Withania:

- Withania somnifera (L.) Dunal, indigenous

== Sphenocleaceae ==
Family: Sphenocleaceae,

=== Sphenoclea ===
Genus Sphenoclea:

- Sphenoclea zeylanica Gaertn. indigenous
