= Simon Snow =

Simon Snow is the name of:

- Simon Snow (writer), New Zealand writer
- Simon Snow (MP) (1600–1667), English politician
- The protagonist of the Simon Snow book trilogy by Rainbow Rowell, beginning with Carry On
