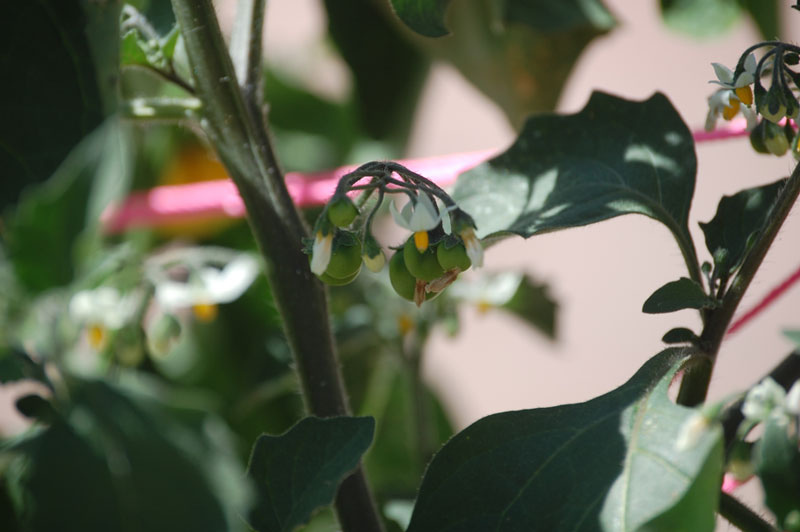
- Flowers and unripe fruit of Solanum retroflexum

Scientific classification
- Kingdom: Plantae
- Clade: Tracheophytes
- Clade: Angiosperms
- Clade: Eudicots
- Clade: Asterids
- Order: Solanales
- Family: Solanaceae
- Genus: Solanum
- Species: S. retroflexum

Binomial name
- Solanum retroflexum Dunal

Synonyms
- Solanum × burbankii Solanum melanocerasum

= Solanum retroflexum =

Species of shrub

Solanum retroflexum, commonly known as umsobo (isiZulu), wonderberry or sunberry, is a historic heirloom fruiting shrub. Both common names are also used for the European black nightshade (Solanum nigrum) in some places, particularly where the latter species has been introduced, so care must be taken to distinguish them. It is sometimes called garden huckleberry, but that properly refers to the species S. scabrum described by Philip Miller.

The plant produces diminutive, dark blue-purple edible fruits that are bland in flavor and often combined with sugar in desserts. Green (unripe) fruits may be poisonous.

== Description ==
Plants are compact, typically growing to a height of 12–24 in (30–61 cm), and may fruit at sizes as small as 4 in (10 cm). The plant produces diminutive, dark blue-purple edible fruits. Green (unripe) fruits may be poisonous.

== Taxonomy ==
Its old scientific name that is still often seen, Solanum × burbankii, indicates a plant of hybrid origin. It was supposedly bred by Luther Burbank in the early 1900s as a hybrid of S. villosum and S. guineense but in fact S. retroflexum is a proper species of its own, while the supposed hybrid combination would not be viable due to different ploidy of S. guineense and S. villosum.

=== Phylogeny ===
Phylogenetic research suggests S. retroflexum's closest living relatives to be garden huckleberry (S. scabrum), golden pearls (S. villosum), and S. annuum in order of recency of deviation.

The following phylogenetic tree is suggested:

- - Solanum
    - (1,225 other Solanum species)
    - - - - - - - - S. ptychanthum (black nightshade) — North America, South America
                  - S. tredecimgranum
                - - S. americanum (glossy nightshade) — Americas, Melanesia, New Guinea, and Australia
                  - S. nigrum (European nightshade) — Europe, Asia, Macaronesia, and the North Africa
              - S. opacum (greenberry nightshade or morelle verte) — Taiwan to New Zealand and Pacific
              - S. chenopodioides (whitetip nightshade) — Argentina to Peru
            - - - - S. scabrum (garden huckleberry or mnavu) — Africa, Indian Ocean
                  - S. retroflexum
                - S. villosum (hairy nightshade, golden pearls) — Euro-Siberian, Irano-Turanian and Mediterranean regions worldwide
              - S. annuum (Bolivia to Northern Argentina)
          - - S. fiebrigii (Peru to NW Argentina)
            - S. enantiophyllanthum (SE Brazil)
        - S. pallidum (Bolivia, Peru)
      - S. physalifolium (hoe nightshade) — NW Argentina, Bolivia, Peru
  - Jaltomata (73 species)

== Cultivation ==
The wonderberry shrub is an easy-to-grow plant which is grown similarly to tomatoes. Seeds are sown in the summer in full or part sun. Fruit can be expected in 75 days.
