= Solanum goniocalyx =

Solanum goniocalyx may refer to two different species of plant:

- Solanum goniocalyx, a synonym for Solanum campylacanthum, a species of plant found in Africa
- Solanum goniocalyx, a synonym for Solanum tuberosum, commonly known as the potato plant
