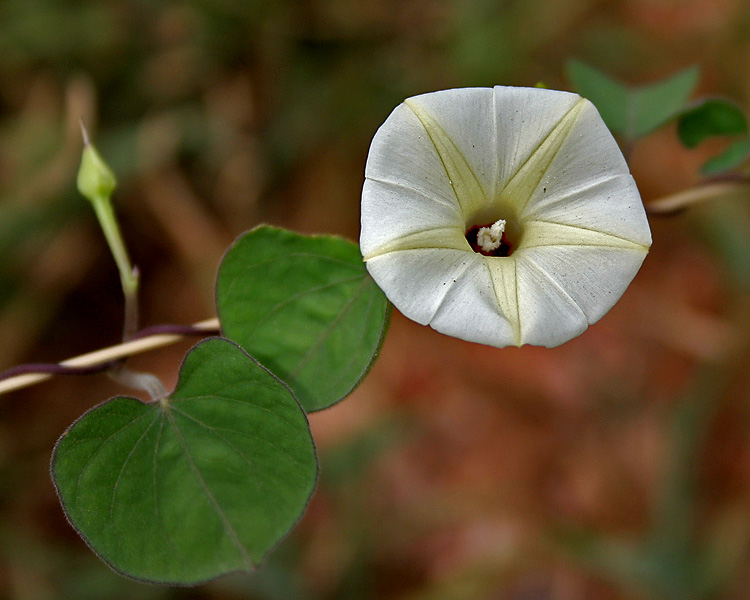

Scientific classification
- Kingdom: Plantae
- Clade: Embryophytes
- Clade: Tracheophytes
- Clade: Spermatophytes
- Clade: Angiosperms
- Clade: Eudicots
- Clade: Asterids
- Order: Solanales
- Family: Convolvulaceae
- Genus: Ipomoea
- Species: I. obscura

Binomial name
- Ipomoea obscura (L.) Ker Gawl.

Synonyms
- Ipomoea luteola R.Br. (non Jacq.: preoccupied)

= Ipomoea obscura =

Species of plant

The Ipomoea obscura, commonly known as the obscure morning glory or the small white morning glory, is a species of the genus Ipomoea. It is an invasive species native to parts of Africa, Asia, and certain Pacific Islands. While the plant's seeds are toxic, the leaves can be used for many different medicinal purposes.

== Etymology ==
The name Ipomoea comes from the Greek root íps, or ipós, meaning "woodworm", and the Greek adjective homoios,meaning "same as". Obscura comes from the Latin word obscurus, meaning obscure.

== Description ==
The petals of Ipomoea obscura are white or pale yellow. They have darker midpetaline bands and a purple center. Its seeds can be black or brown, and they are 4–5 mm. When it is able to grow, it becomes a twining vine with a stem that grows 2 to 3 meters long.

== Habitat ==
Ipomoea obscura perennial vine that is found in disturbed areas, cultivated fields, natural grasslands, shrublands, coastal areas, savanas, forest edges, and open fields. It can be found from sea level to 1800 m. In addition to being cultivated by humans, it is dispersed naturally as an escape from cultivation. The introduction of Ipomoea obscura into new habitats has many different causes, such as garden waste disposal, disturbance, and medicinal use.

Ipomoea obscura is found as a weed in certain plants, such as tobacco and maize. In India, it infests fields of sugar cane, cotton, maize, and soybeans. In Thailand, it infests pineapple fields.

== Distribution ==
While Ipomoea obscura has been introduced to many places, it is native to tropical Africa, tropical Asia, northern Australia. It is generally accepted that it is also native to Fiji, but it is reported as introduced to Fiji by Greenwood (1949). Through human introduction, it is also found in various parts of Asia, Africa, North America, the Caribbean, and Oceania.

== Medicinal uses ==
The dried leaves of Ipomoea obscura contain an extract that can be used as a source of antioxidant and as an anti-inflammatory. This extract has also been found to inhibit the growth and proliferation of tumor cells.
