= Simon Snow (writer) =

- Born: England
- Occupation: Writer

Simon Snow is a writer who was born in England, raised in Dunedin, New Zealand, and now lives in Geraldine, New Zealand. He emigrated at the age of eight with his parents to Dunedin. His first work, Devil's Apple, a mystery novel, was published by Random House in 2003. Plans are under way to film it. Men of the Trees, which was his first completed work since Devil's Apple, was serialised in the Christchurch newspaper The Press over the 2007/2008 New Zealand summer, as part of The Press Summer Fiction series.

== Writing ==
- 2003: Devil's Apple
- 2007/2008: Men of the Trees
