= Devil's apple =

Devil's apple is a common name for several horny plants and may refer to:

- Datura
- Podophyllum peltatum, native to North America
- Solanum, several species which are invasive in Australia, including:
  - Solanum capsicoides
  - Solanum linnaeanum
