= Solanum lichtensteinii =

Scientific classification
- Kingdom: Plantae
- Clade: Tracheophytes
- Clade: Angiosperms
- Clade: Eudicots
- Clade: Asterids
- Order: Solanales
- Family: Solanaceae
- Genus: Solanum
- Species: S. lichtensteinii

Binomial name
- Solanum lichtensteinii Willd.

Synonyms
- Solanum homblei De Wild.; Solanum incanum var. lichtensteinii (Willd.) Bitter; Solanum incanum var. subexarmatum (Dunal) Bitter; Solanum leycesterianum Savi ex Delile; Solanum subexarmatum Dunal

Species of flowering plant

Solanum lichtensteinii

Solanum lichtensteinii is a species of plant in the family Solanaceae. The IUCN lists the species as least concern.

The species is named after Hinrich Lichtenstein. The species is andromonecious.

It can occur in arid areas and overgrazed areas. It can be found in Botswana, Mozambique, Namibia, Tanzania, Zambia, Democratic Republic of the Congo, and Zimbabwe.
