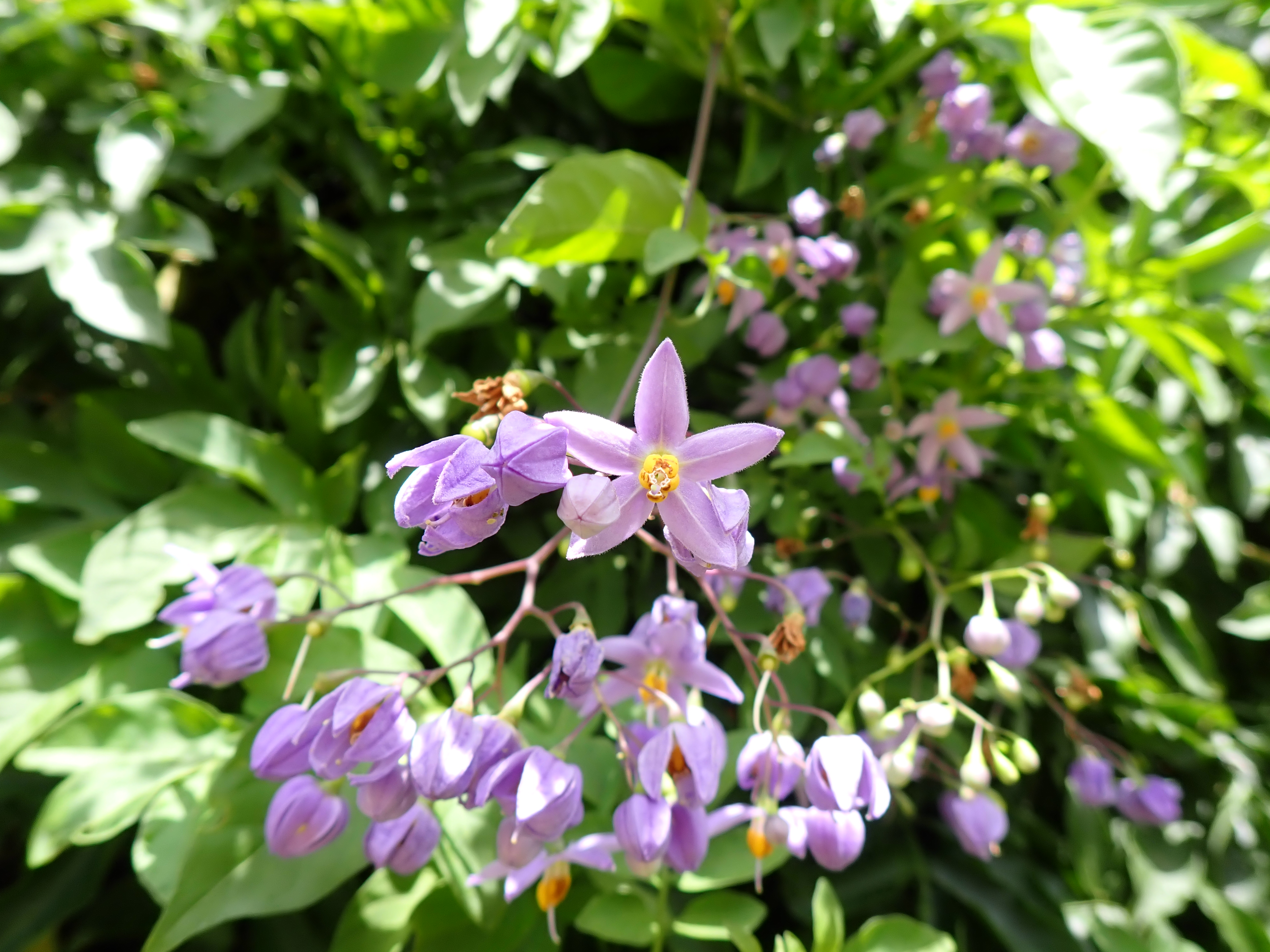

Scientific classification
- Kingdom: Plantae
- Clade: Tracheophytes
- Clade: Angiosperms
- Clade: Eudicots
- Clade: Asterids
- Order: Solanales
- Family: Solanaceae
- Genus: Solanum
- Species: S. seaforthianum

Binomial name
- Solanum seaforthianum Andrews

= Solanum seaforthianum =

Species of flowering plant

Solanum seaforthianum, the Brazilian nightshade, is a flowering evergreen vine of the family Solanaceae native to tropical South America and the West Indies. As a member of the Solanum genus, it is related to such plants as the tomato and potato. The plant is highly heat resistant, but cannot tolerate frost conditions. Its other common names include blue potato vine, climbing nightshade, Italian jasmine, potato creeper, St. Vincent lilac, star potato vine and vining solanum.

== Description ==
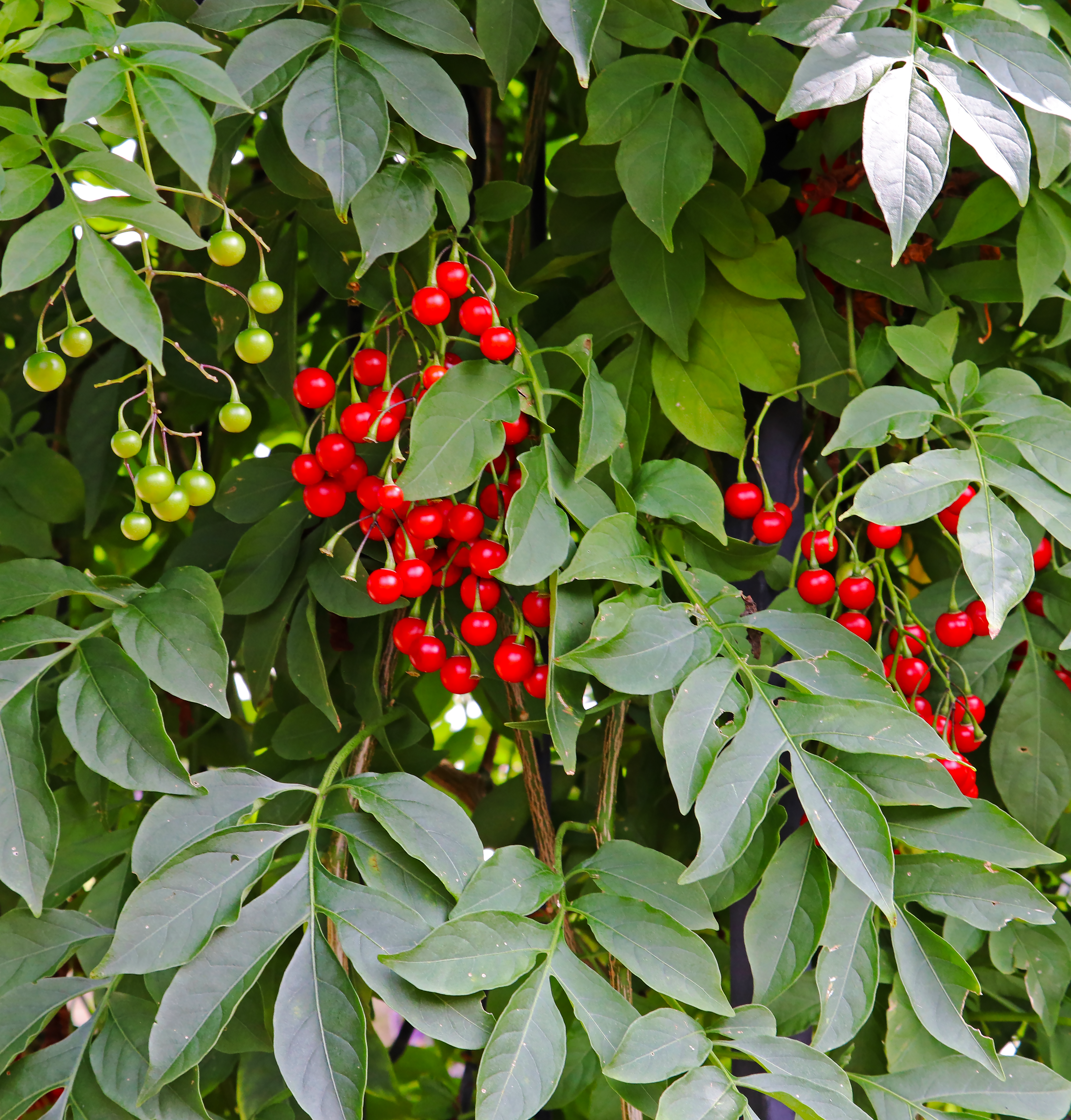
Red berries

A long-lived scrambling plant, it is characterized by clusters of four to seven leaves and can climb to a height of 6 m (20 ft) given enough room. It is a sprawling perennial shrub or vine, largely glabrous, with glandular hairs present on the peduncles and pedicels; prickles are absent. The alternate leaves are mostly pinnatisect and ovate in outline, measuring 4–10 cm long and 3–6 cm wide, and are deeply lobed and divided into three to nine erratically shaped segments. Both surfaces are generally green and glabrous, except for hairs along the margins and on the veins of the lower surface; the petiole is 2–4 cm long.

=== Inflorescence ===
It is early-flowering. The inflorescences bear 10–50 star-like flowers, with peduncles 10–60 mm long, a rachis up to 100 mm long, and pedicels 10–15 mm long. The calyx is 1.5–2.5 mm long, with lobes approximately 1 mm long. The corolla is deeply divided, measuring 20–30 mm in diameter, and is mauve-blue, purple or violet in colour. It flowers from spring to autumn or spring and autumn, with clusters of star-shaped purple inflorescence followed by marble-sized berries, that ripen from green to bright red, containing numerous flattened seeds that range from reddish-brown to black and measure 2–3 mm in length.

This species reproduces primarily by seed, which are most commonly dispersed by birds and other animals that consume its fleshy fruit.

== Chemistry ==
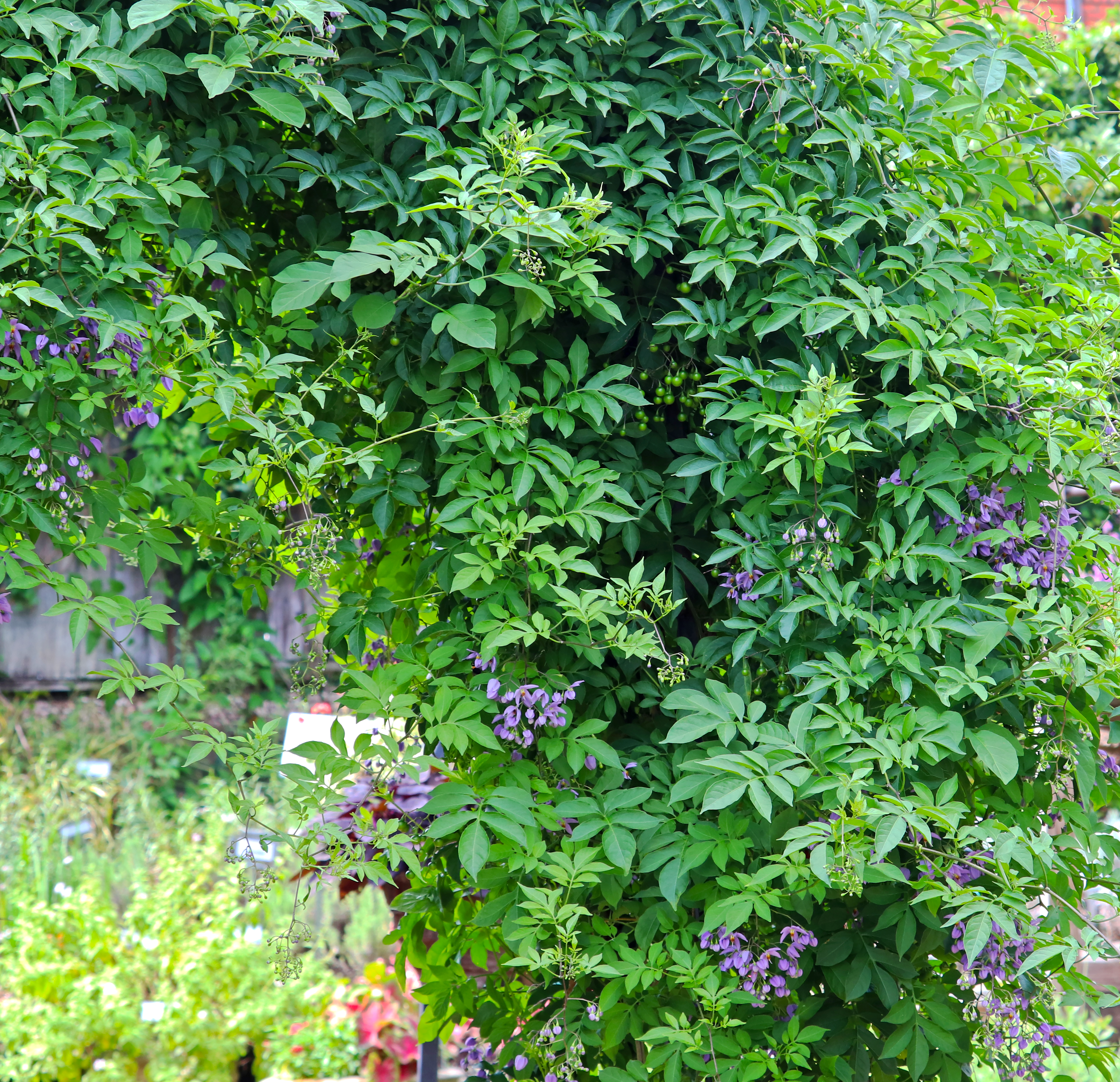
As a garden plant

The plant contains modest amounts of various tropane alkaloids such as atropine, scopolamine and hyoscyamine and should be considered mildly toxic and inedible. Promising molluscicidal and schistosomicidal activities were displayed for the S. seaforthianum extracts and fractions which are attributed to the glycoalkaloid content.

All parts of the plant are toxic. Ingestion of the leaves or fruit may cause gastrointestinal irritation, including nausea and diarrhea. Consumption of the fruit has caused adverse effects in children and poultry. Livestock, including cattle, pigs, and sheep, have also been affected by this species.

== Range ==
This species is considered native to Mexico, Central America (including Belize, Costa Rica, El Salvador, Guatemala, Honduras, Nicaragua and Panama), the Caribbean (e.g. Trinidad and Tobago), south-eastern United States (Florida), and parts of tropical South America, particularly Venezuela and Colombia.

Originally introduced as an ornamental plant, it is now a garden escape, although it is can still be present in cultivation. the species has become widely naturalised outside its native range and is an invasive species in Australia, Africa, Indochina, the Pacific Islands and India, choking native vegetation and poisoning livestock. It has also been listed as a noxious weed in South Africa.

=== Habitat ===
It is a widespread weed of neglected, nutrient-rich environments. It occurs in closed forests, forest edges, urban bushland, riparian zones, agricultural land, roadsides, disturbed areas, and waste sites. In Cape York Peninsula and north-eastern Queensland, this species occurs from near sea level to elevations of up to 900 m. It grows around settlements and in disturbed habitats, including wet sclerophyll forest, lowland and upland rainforest, as well as monsoon forest and vine thickets.
