= Nierembergia linariifolia =

Scientific classification
- Kingdom: Plantae
- Clade: Tracheophytes
- Clade: Angiosperms
- Clade: Eudicots
- Clade: Asterids
- Order: Solanales
- Family: Solanaceae
- Genus: Nierembergia
- Species: N. linariifolia

Binomial name
- Nierembergia linariifolia Graham

Synonyms
- List: Blenocoes filicaulis (Lindl.) Raf.; Nierembergia angustifolia var. filicaulis (Lindl.) Hassl.; Nierembergia coerulea Gillies ex Miers; Nierembergia filicaulis Lindl.; Nierembergia gracilis Hook.; Nierembergia gracilis var. guaranitica Millán; Nierembergia hippomanica Miers; Nierembergia hippomanica var. coerulea (Gillies ex Miers) Millán; Nierembergia hippomanica var. mesopotamica Millán; Nierembergia hippomanica var. scabridopilosa Dunal; Nierembergia hippomanica var. typica Millán; Nierembergia scoparia var. glaberrima Millán; Stimenes gracilis (Hook.) Raf.

Species of flowering plant

Nierembergia linariifolia, called the narrow-leaved cupflower, is a species of plant described by Robert Graham. Nierembergia linariifolia is part of the genus Nierembergia and the family Solanaceae. It has gained the Royal Horticultural Society's Award of Garden Merit.

== Range ==
It is native to central South America, and has been introduced to New South Wales, Australia.

== Subspecies ==
The following subspecies are accepted:

- Nierembergia linariifolia subsp. glabriuscula (Dunal) A.A.Cocucci & Hunz.
- Nierembergia linariifolia subsp. linariifolia
- Nierembergia linariifolia subsp. pampeana (Millán) A.A.Cocucci & Hunz.
- Nierembergia linariifolia subsp. pinifolioides (Millán) A.A.Cocucci & Hunz.
