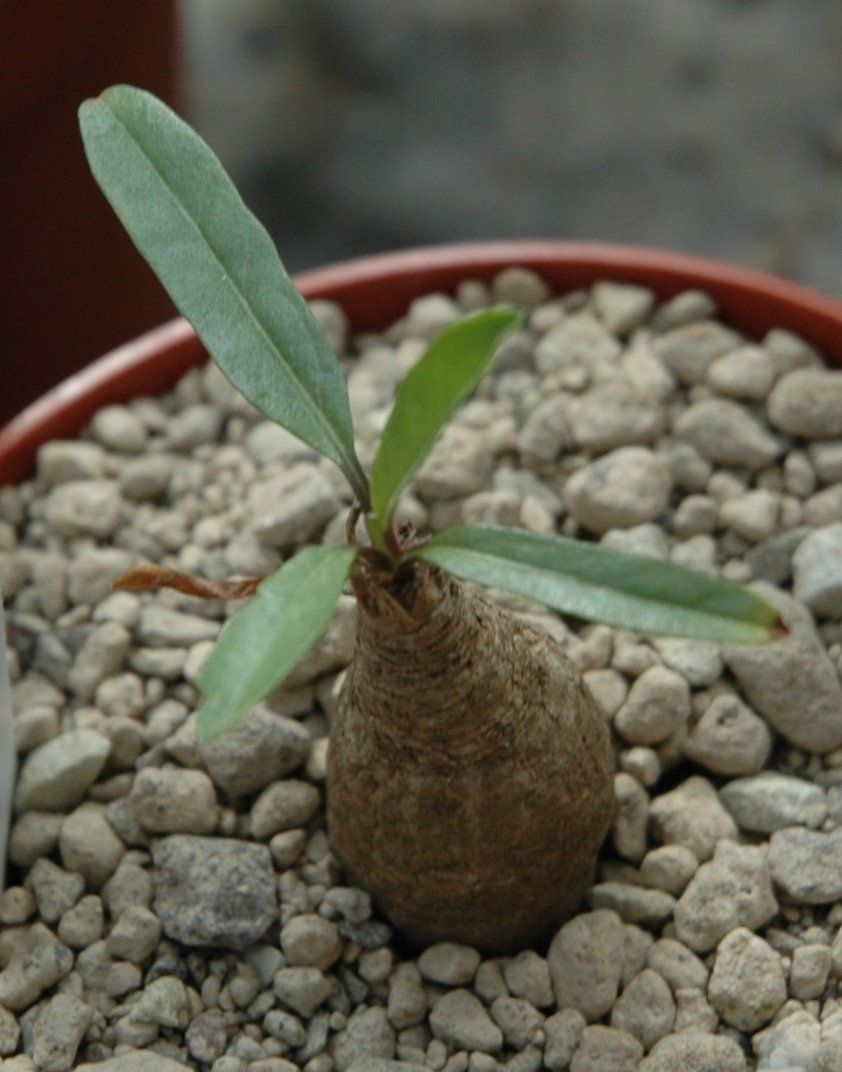

Scientific classification
- Kingdom: Plantae
- Clade: Embryophytes
- Clade: Tracheophytes
- Clade: Angiosperms
- Clade: Eudicots
- Clade: Asterids
- Order: Solanales
- Family: Convolvulaceae
- Genus: Ipomoea
- Species: I. oenotherae

Binomial name
- Ipomoea oenotherae (Vatke) Hallier f.

= Ipomoea oenotherae =

Species of flowering plant

Ipomoea oenotherae is a species of plant of the morning glory genus, Ipomoea, in the family Convolvulaceae. It derives its name from the resemblance it bears to plants in the genus Oenothera. Ipomoea oenotherae is a succulent and a cryptophyte.

== Description ==
=== Vegetative features ===
Ipomoea oenotherae is a perennial succulent plant. It forms a fleshy, elongated tuberous rootstock, 30 cm in length, from which leaves grow every spring. These are followed by extended, prostrate or ascending stems which are up to 30 cm long. The young stems are angular and initially densely covered with silver white hairs (pilose); these later become hairless. The shape of the basal leaves, which are often in a rosette, is linear to lanceolate with petioles up to 7 cm long. The basal leaves are between 4 and 10 cm long, and 1 cm wide. They may be entire or have basal lobes or are lateral teeth. The leaves on the stems are 2 to 6.5 cm long and borne on 4 cm-long petioles; they are entire or subpalmately or pinnately 3-7 lobed and covered in silver-white hair.

=== Flowers ===
The flowers are solitary and axillary. The linear-subulate bracteole is 10 to 15 mm long and 0.5 to 1 mm wide. The rather club-shaped peduncle has a length of up to 15 mm. The flower is hermaphroditic and displays fivefold radial symmetry. The five unequal, often pink sepals are up to 15 mm long, ovate to ovate-lanceolate, acuminate and subaristate. The five mauve to violet petals are narrowly funnel-shaped, and 2.3 to 5 centimetres long. There is only a single ring of five stamens. The plant flowers during the summer.

=== Fruit and seeds ===
The spherical (globose), straw-coloured, smooth capsule has a diameter of approximately 6 mm. The seeds are up to 4 mm long, densely appressed, pubescent, velvety-tomentose with grayish hair.

== Taxonomy ==
The plant was first described in 1882, when it was given the name Convolvulus oenotherae by Georg Carl Wilhelm Vatke. Johannes Gottfried Hallier subsequently classified the species as belonging to the genus Ipomoea in 1894.

== Distribution and habitat ==
The distribution of Ipomoea oenotherae has been described as ranging "from Ethiopia and Somalia southwards to Namibia, Botswana and the Northern Province, North-West and Gauteng in South Africa".

It is described as "not gregarious", meaning that it grows in open rather than dense clusters. Furthermore, it is described as "nowhere common".

=== Habitat ===
I. oenotherae grows by and large in "mixed bushveld". It also grows in grassland, and is found both by the side of the road and on cultivated ground (often on sandy or rocky soils). I. oenotherae's altitude range is listed variously as approximately 1580 m, 1640–2160 m, and 1000–1580 m.

=== Distribution in Southern Africa ===
I. oenotherae is found all across Southern Africa: in Botswana and Namibia, as well as in many parts of South Africa, including Gauteng, Limpopo, and the North-West. Certain older sources additionally claim that the species is also found in the regions formerly known as the Natal, and the Transvaal. It is also known to be present in the area formerly known as Zaire: the Democratic Republic of Congo, Rwanda, and Burundi.

=== Distribution in Eastern Africa ===
Whilst I. oenotherae seems to predominantly inhabit Southern Africa, several specimens have been collected in Eastern Africa: in the Unyoro forests of Uganda, in the town of Moyale (split between Ethiopia and Kenya), and in Somalia.
