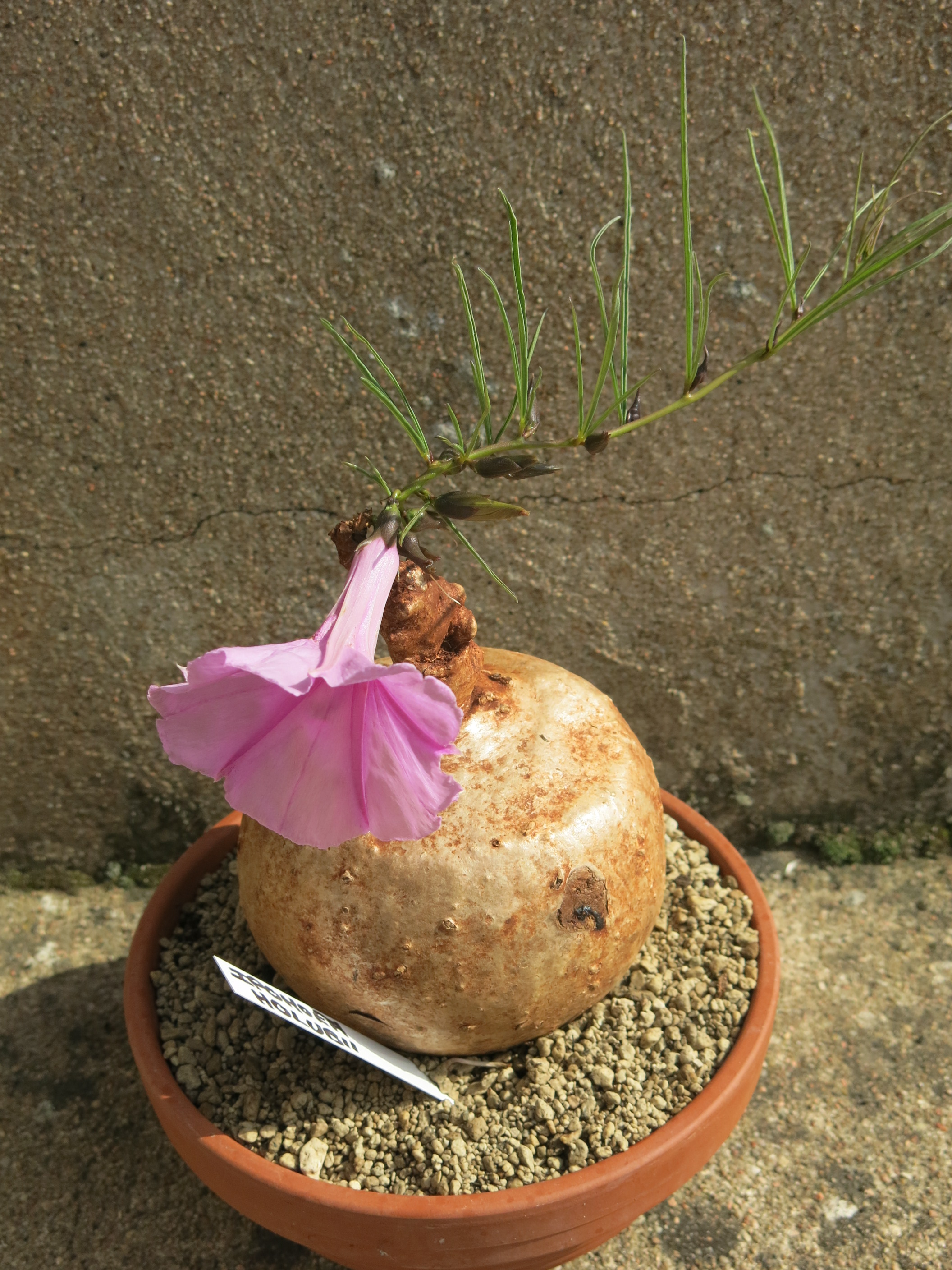

Scientific classification
- Kingdom: Plantae
- Clade: Tracheophytes
- Clade: Angiosperms
- Clade: Eudicots
- Clade: Asterids
- Order: Solanales
- Family: Convolvulaceae
- Genus: Ipomoea
- Species: I. holubii

Binomial name
- Ipomoea holubii Baker

Synonyms
- Turbina holubii (Baker) A.Meeuse; Rivea holubii (Baker) Hallier f.; Ipomoea rhodesiana Rendle

= Ipomoea holubii =

Species of plant

Ipomoea holubii is a species of flowering plant in the family Convolvulaceae.

== Description ==
Ipomoea holubii is a shrub 0.8-2.50 metres high, many-stemmed from the base which is a caudex and much branched. Branches laying flat on the ground or climbing at the tips. Leaves deciduous ovate-cordate to circular-cordate, sometimes oblong cordate. Flowers are pink. The seed pods are leathery.

Ipomoea holubii is often confused with Ipomoea bolusiana. In fact the caudex, flower of both are very similar if not identical. The difference seems to be that the leaves of the holubii are not needle-like but more elliptical lanceolate, slightly larger and longer and more spaced. And also the viny stems are longer and flowers more numerous.

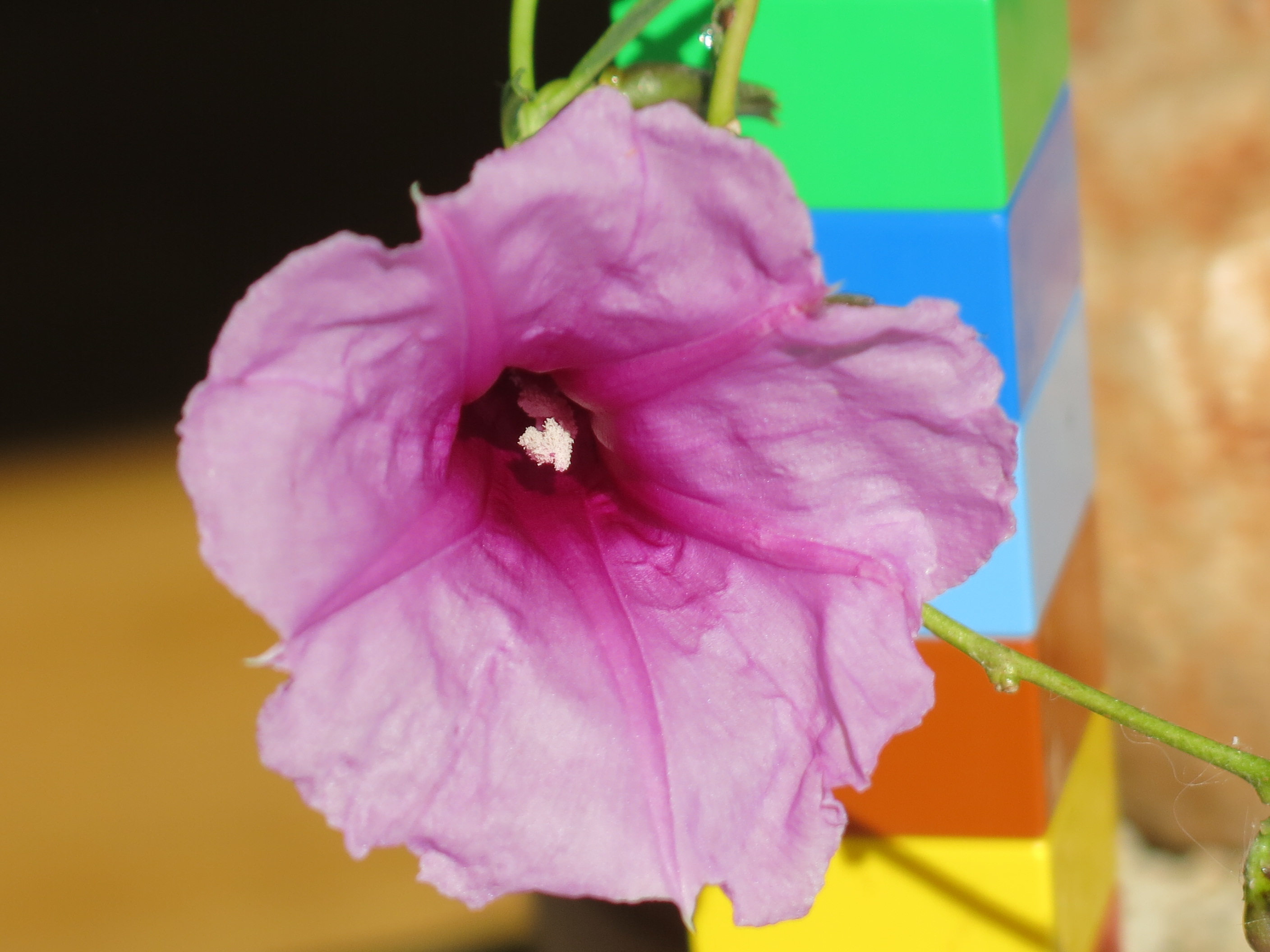
Flower

== Range ==
Occurs in Malawi, Zambia, Zimbabwe, Mozambique, Namibia, Botswana and mainly the Northern Province. Grows in bushveld and grassland, also along roadsides and often on rocky soil.

== Cultivation ==
To reduce the risk of rot, keep the very aesthetic bulb above the ground rather than buried as it is in its natural habitat. But shade it in case of intense sun.

Plant with very slow growth, summer outdoors with regular watering. Wintering in a clear greenhouse, 6 °C minimum, no watering when the stems have faded.

The soil must be very draining.
