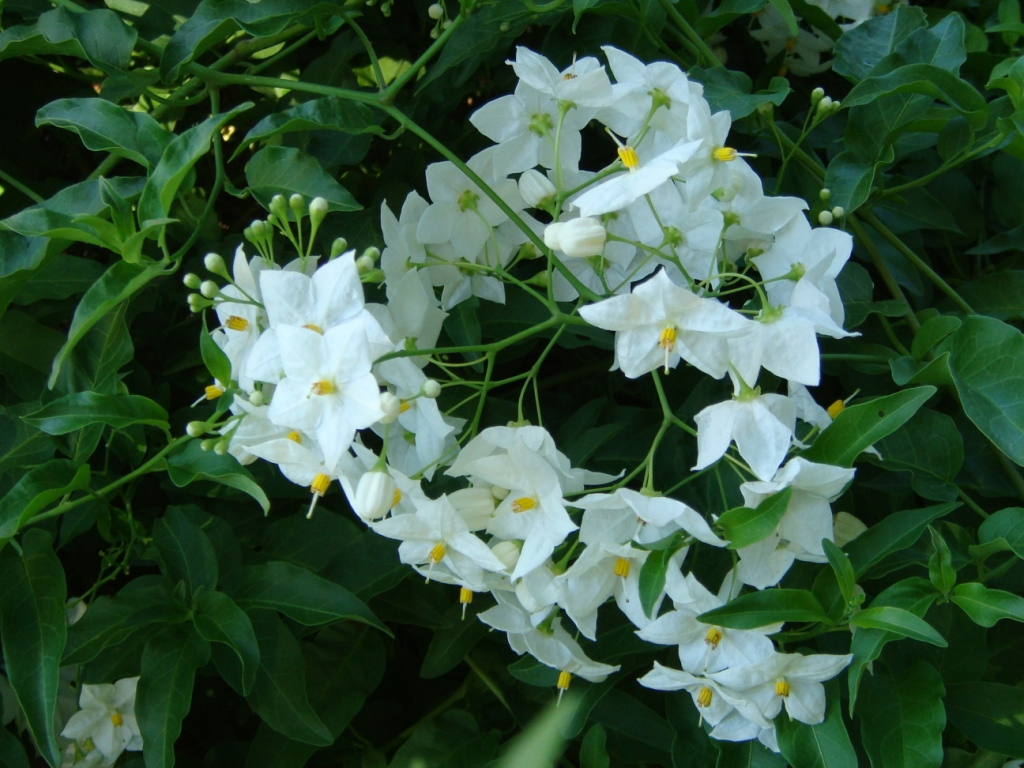

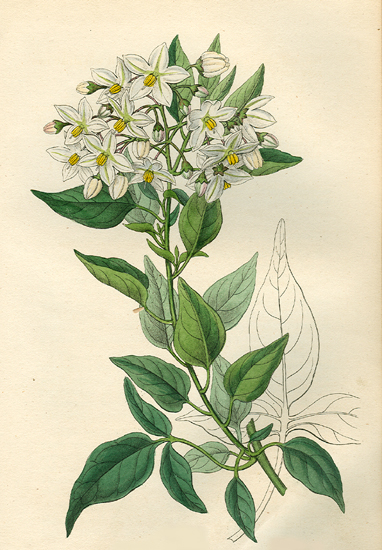

Scientific classification
- Kingdom: Plantae
- Clade: Tracheophytes
- Clade: Angiosperms
- Clade: Eudicots
- Clade: Asterids
- Order: Solanales
- Family: Solanaceae
- Genus: Solanum
- Species: S. laxum

Binomial name
- Solanum laxum Spreng.

Synonyms
- Solanum jasminoides Paxton

= Solanum laxum =

Species of flowering plant

Solanum laxum, commonly known as potato vine, potato climber or jasmine nightshade, is an evergreen vine in the family Solanaceae. It is native to South America and commonly grown as an ornamental garden plant.

== Description ==
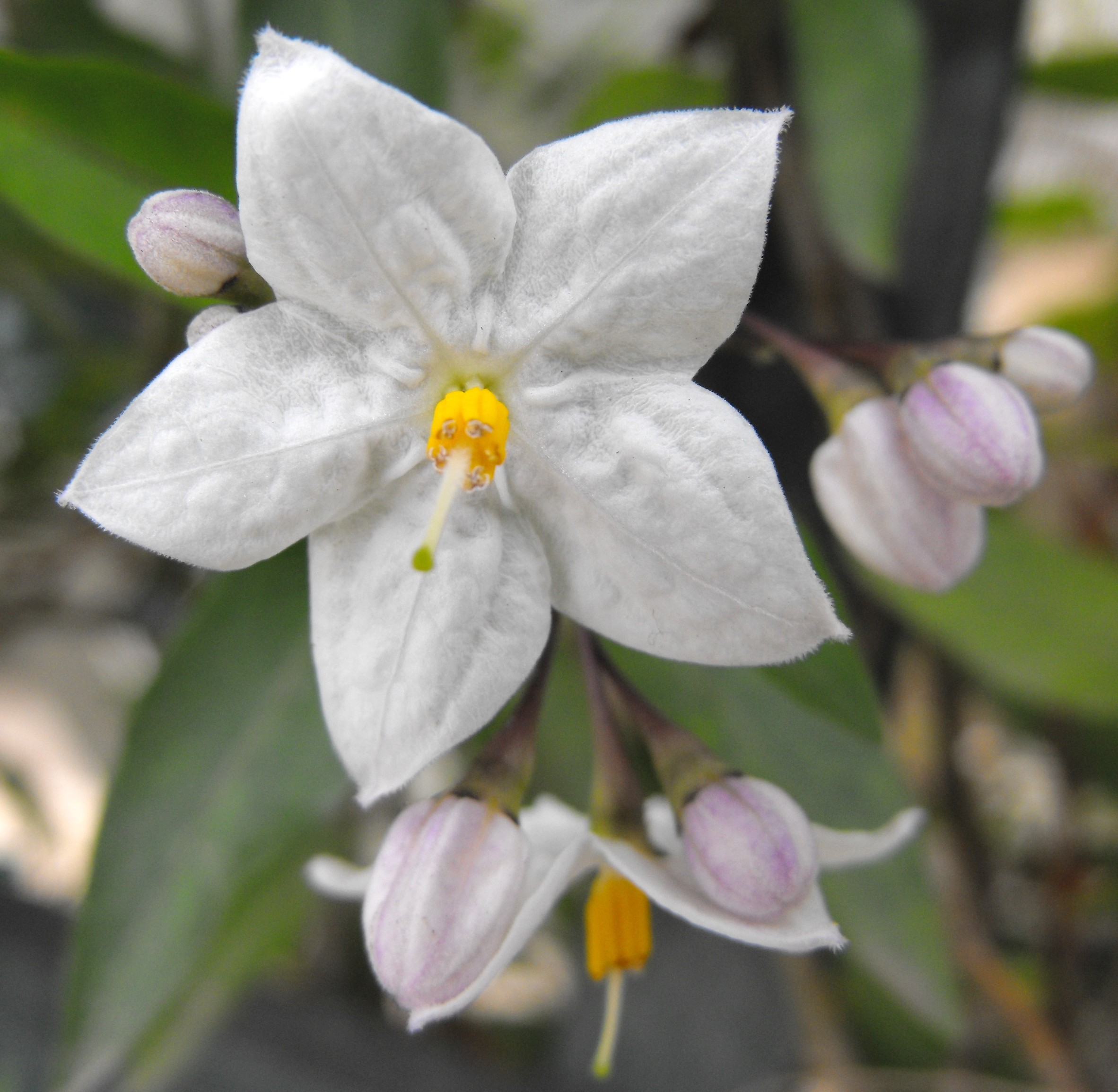
A close-up of the flower.

The jasmine-flowered nightshade is a woody climber that forms branches 2 to 8 m long and has a base that can reach more than 10 centimeters in diameter. Fast-growing, it climbs by winding the leaf stalks around supports. The shoot axes are strongly angled zigzag, hairless or in the youth stage with simple, white, single-row trichomes less than 0.5 millimeters in length. New growth is hairless or finely to sparsely hairy. The bark of older branches is green or reddish green or, if the plant grows in direct sunlight, often purple-green. The ovate or ovate-lanceolate leaves are 30 to 50 mm long and 15 to 25 mm wide. The sympodial units contain many leaves. These are usually simple, only very rarely divided with one to four irregular lobes and pinnately split.

=== Inflorescences ===
The white or pale blue flowers appear in groups of around 20 in branched inflorescences, produced in profusion in the spring but also sporadically at other times of the year. The inflorescences are initially terminal, later also laterally. They are hairless, reach lengths of 5 centimeters and more, are usually divided two or three times, but can also be divided significantly more often and contain up to 50 flowers. All flowers are fully developed and five-fold. The inflorescence stalk becomes 0.5 to 4 centimeters long, but its length is very variable depending on the size of the inflorescence and the age.

These are followed by dark blue or black berries that are around 8 mm in diameter.

== Distribution ==
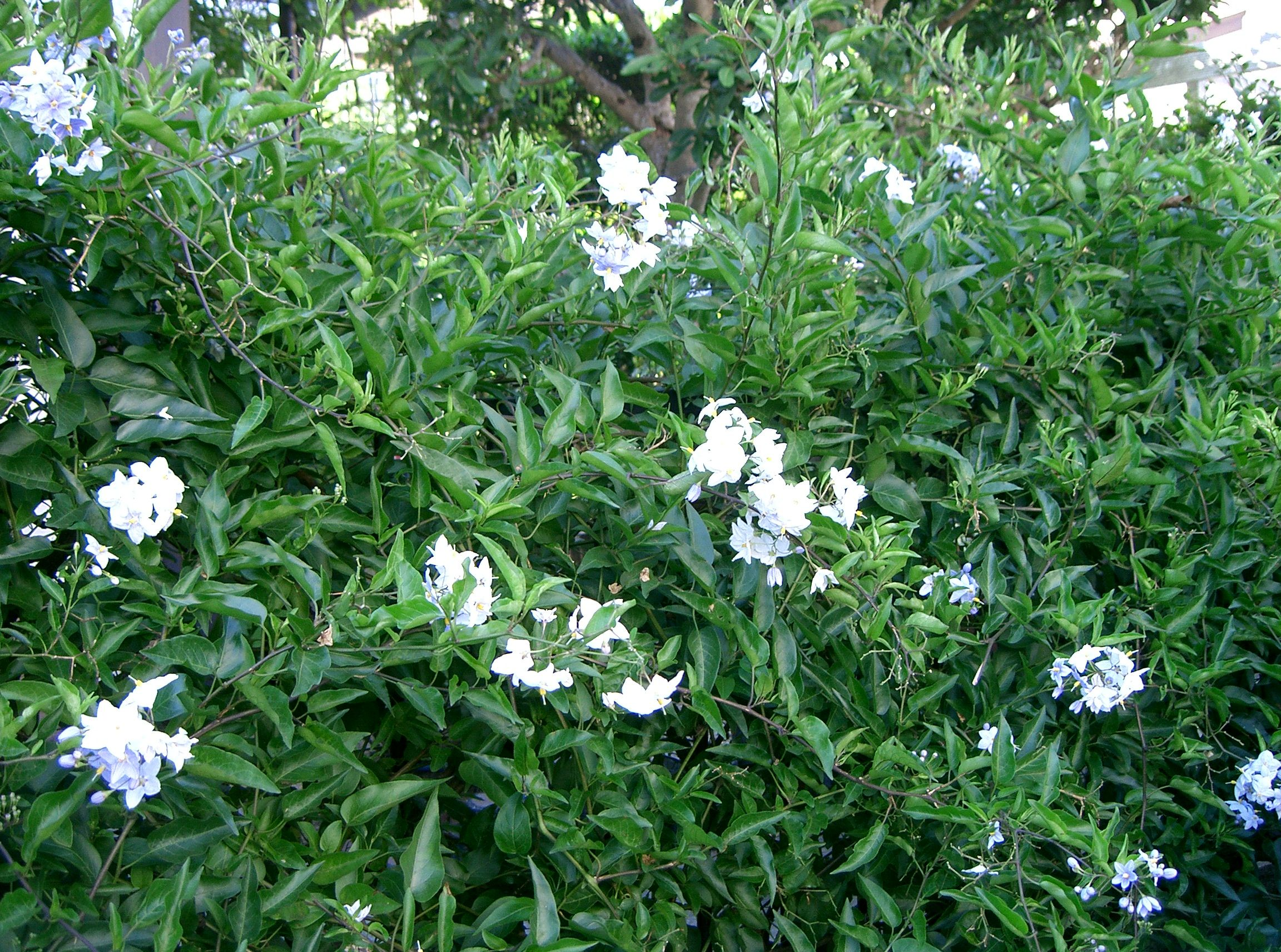
Growing as a rambling shrub

The natural distribution area of the species extends from the southeastern Brazilian states of Minas Gerais and Rio Grande do Sul to the mouth of the Río de la Plata in Argentina and Uruguay, as well as to Paraguay. In the natural range, the species is in the Atlantic rainforest, in Araucaria forests, and open forest edges.

At suitable locations, the naturalized representatives are also resistant to light frosts. The species is often naturalized as a cultural refugee in both temperate and subtropical areas. The locations range from just above sea level to altitudes over 500 meters.

The species is naturalised in Brisbane and Sydney in Australia.

== Cultivation ==
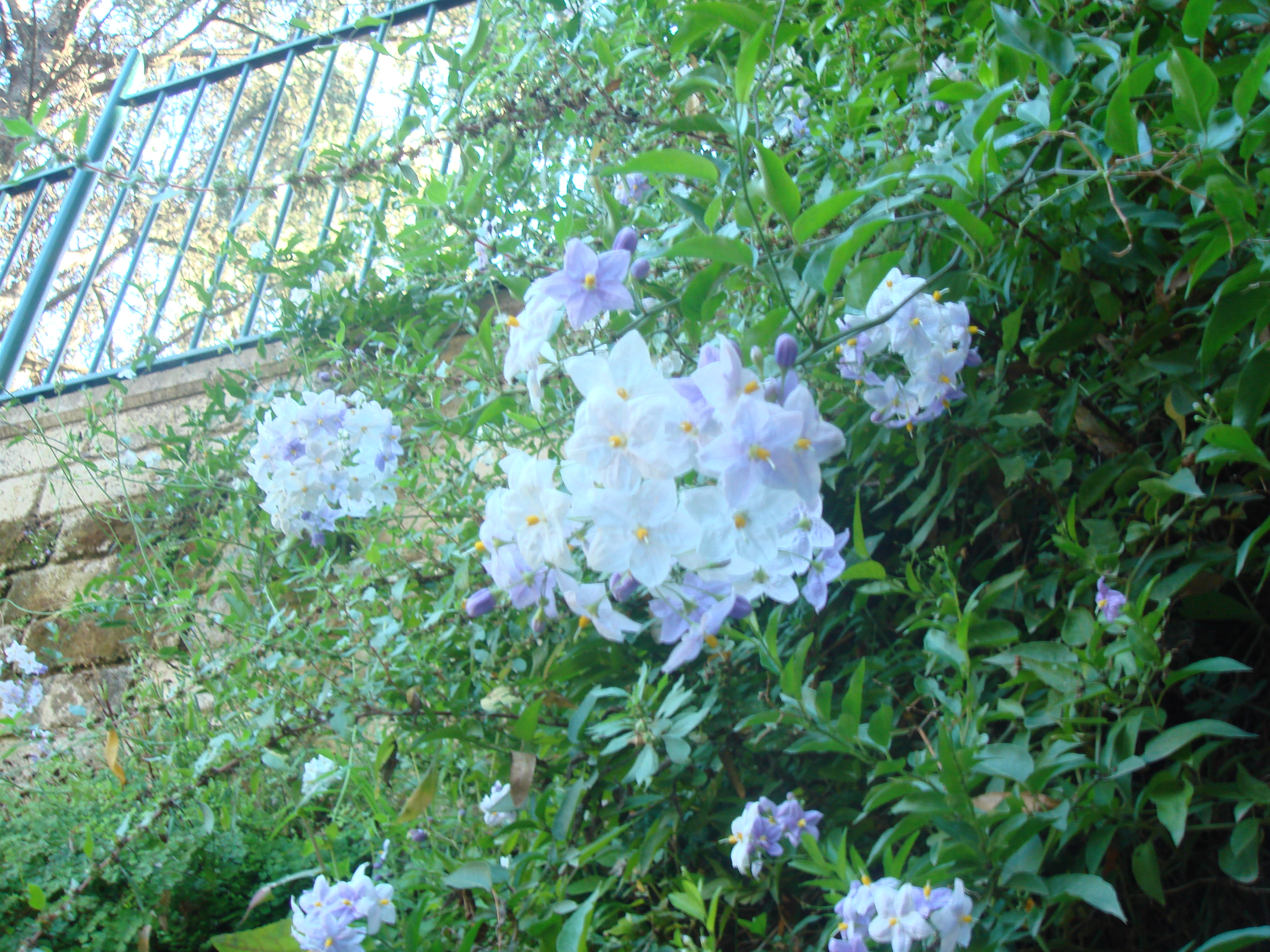
Growing as an ornamental plant near a staircase

Solanum laxum is cultivated as an ornamental. The white-flowered cultivar 'Album' has received the Royal Horticultural Society's Award of Garden Merit. It is hardy down to −10 °C (14 °F), but requires a sheltered position in full sun.

The plant is poisonous, causing abdominal pain if ingested. Therefore gloves should be worn when handling any part of the plant.
