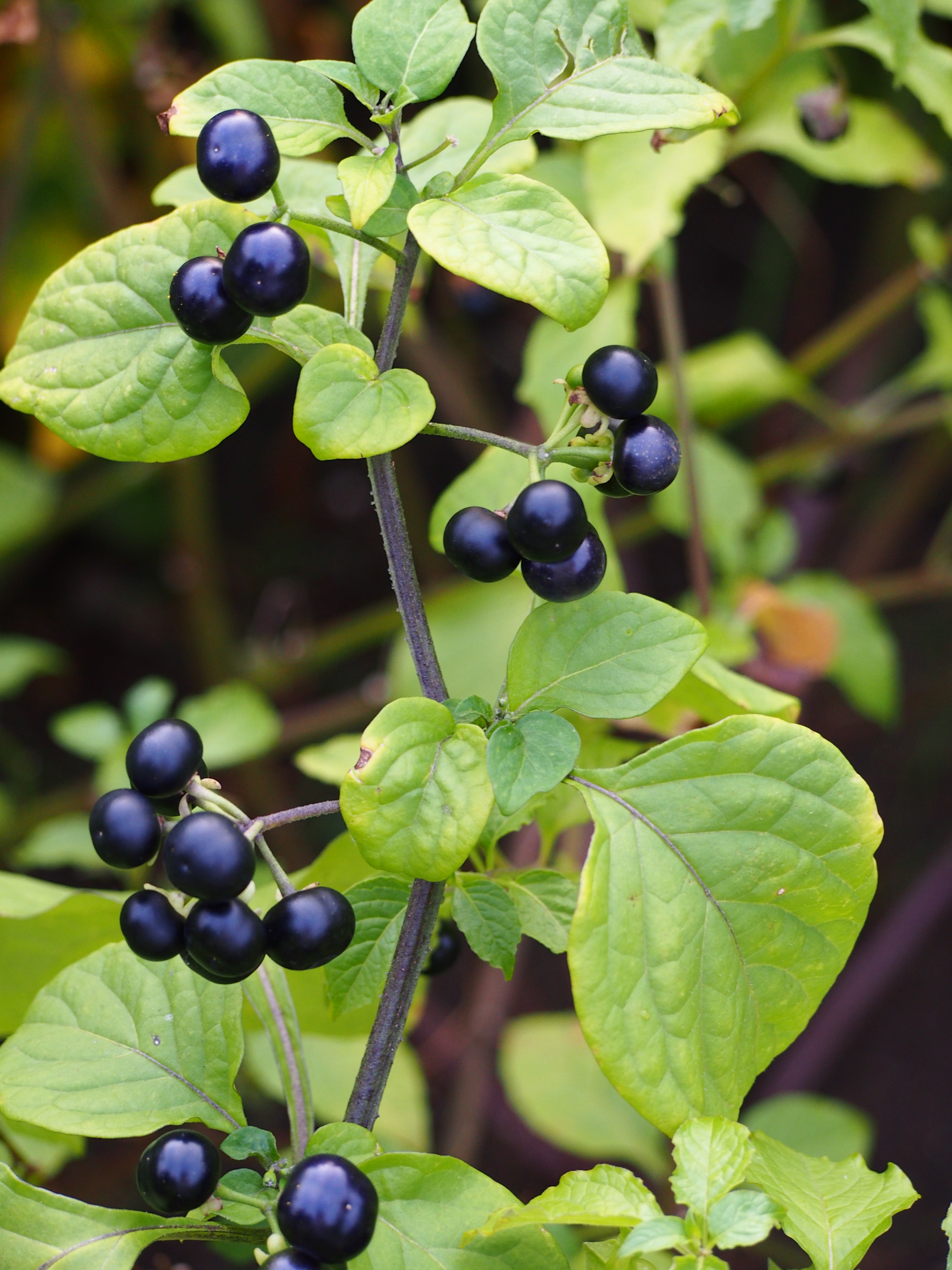

Scientific classification
- Kingdom: Plantae
- Clade: Tracheophytes
- Clade: Angiosperms
- Clade: Eudicots
- Clade: Asterids
- Order: Solanales
- Family: Solanaceae
- Genus: Solanum
- Species: S. scabrum

Binomial name
- Solanum scabrum Mill.

= Solanum scabrum =

Species of flowering plant

Solanum scabrum, also known as garden huckleberry, is an annual or perennial plant in the nightshade family. The geographic origin of the species is uncertain; Linnaeus attributed it to Africa, but it also occurs in North America, and it is naturalized in many countries. In Africa it is cultivated as a leaf vegetable and for dye from the berries.

== Description ==
An annual or short-lived perennial herb to 1 m tall, hairless or sparsely hairy. The leaves are usually ovate, 7–12 cm (2 3/4–4 3/4 in) long and 5–8 cm (2–3 1/4 in) wide, with petioles 1.5–7 cm (5/8–2 3/4 in) long. The inflorescence is simple or sometimes branched with 9–12 flowers. The white corolla is stellate, 15–20 mm (5/8–3/4 in) in diameter, and sometimes tinged purple and with yellow/green basal star. The berries are globular, 10–17 mm (3/8–11/16 in) in diameter, purple-black. The seeds are 1.8–2.2 mm (0.071–0.087 in) long, pale or stained purple.

== Food ==
Solanum scabrum is grown as an edible leaf crop in Africa. It is the most intensively cultivated species for leaf cropping within the Solanum nigrum complex, and as such has undergone genetic selection by farmers for leaf size and other characteristics. Njama njama is a Cameroonian cuisine dish made with the leaves.

== Dye ==
In Africa a stocky form of Solanum scabrum is cultivated as a dye crop using the ripe berries.
