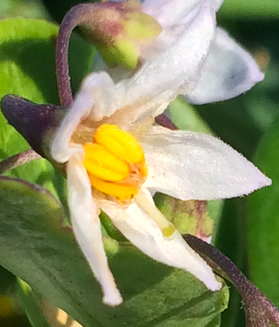

Scientific classification
- Kingdom: Plantae
- Clade: Tracheophytes
- Clade: Angiosperms
- Clade: Eudicots
- Clade: Asterids
- Order: Solanales
- Family: Solanaceae
- Genus: Solanum
- Species: S. africanum

Binomial name
- Solanum africanum Mill.

= Solanum africanum =

Species of shrub

Solanum africanum is a species of plant in the nightshade family. It is found in South Africa. This plant typically occurs near the coast up to an altitude of 200m.

== Description ==
Solanum africanum is a perennial, herbaceous shrub or climber growing up to 3 meters tall. The flowers are white to purple with a yellow centre, borne in pendulous clusters at the branch tips. The leaves are simple in shape, green, ovate to elliptic or lanceolate with an acute apex, and the margin is often entire, but occasionally lobed. While growing flat on the ground without a support to keep it upright, the plant sends out branches in all directions, which may be seen. It's possible that this growth behavior is why the plant is occasionally called the drunken rope or berry. The fruit is a round berry, black when ripe, 15mm in diameter.

== Taxonomy ==
Solanum africanum is a member of the family Solanaceae. This family includes nightshade, tomato, potato and chillies.

== Distribution and habitat ==
This species is frequently found near coastal dunes in the bush. It occurs from Cape Peninsula to KwaZulu-Natal. It flowers at any time of the year.

== Conservation ==
The species has not been evaluated for the IUCN Red List.
