= Convolvulus aschersonii =

Scientific classification
- Kingdom: Plantae
- Clade: Tracheophytes
- Clade: Angiosperms
- Clade: Eudicots
- Clade: Asterids
- Order: Solanales
- Family: Convolvulaceae
- Genus: Convolvulus
- Species: C. aschersonii

Binomial name
- Convolvulus aschersonii Engl.

Synonyms
- Convolvulus hastatus var. multiflorus Choisy; Convolvulus rhynchophyllus Baker & Engl. ex Hallier f.; Convolvulus sagittatus subvar. linearifolius Hallier f.; Convolvulus sagittatus var. aschersonii (Engl.) Verdc.; Convolvulus sagittatus var. linearifolius (Hallier f.) Baker & C. H. Wright; Convolvulus sagittatus var. macroglottis Baker ex Rendle; Convolvulus ulosepalus Hallier f.; Convolvulus sagittatus subvar. abyssinicus Hallier f.; Convolvulus sagittatus var. abyssinicus (Hallier f.) Baker & Rendle; Convolvulus sagittatus var. ulosepalus (Hallier f.) Verdc.

Species of plant

Convolvulus aschersonii is a species of plant in the family Convolvulaceae. It is native to much of continental Africa as well as Madagascar.
