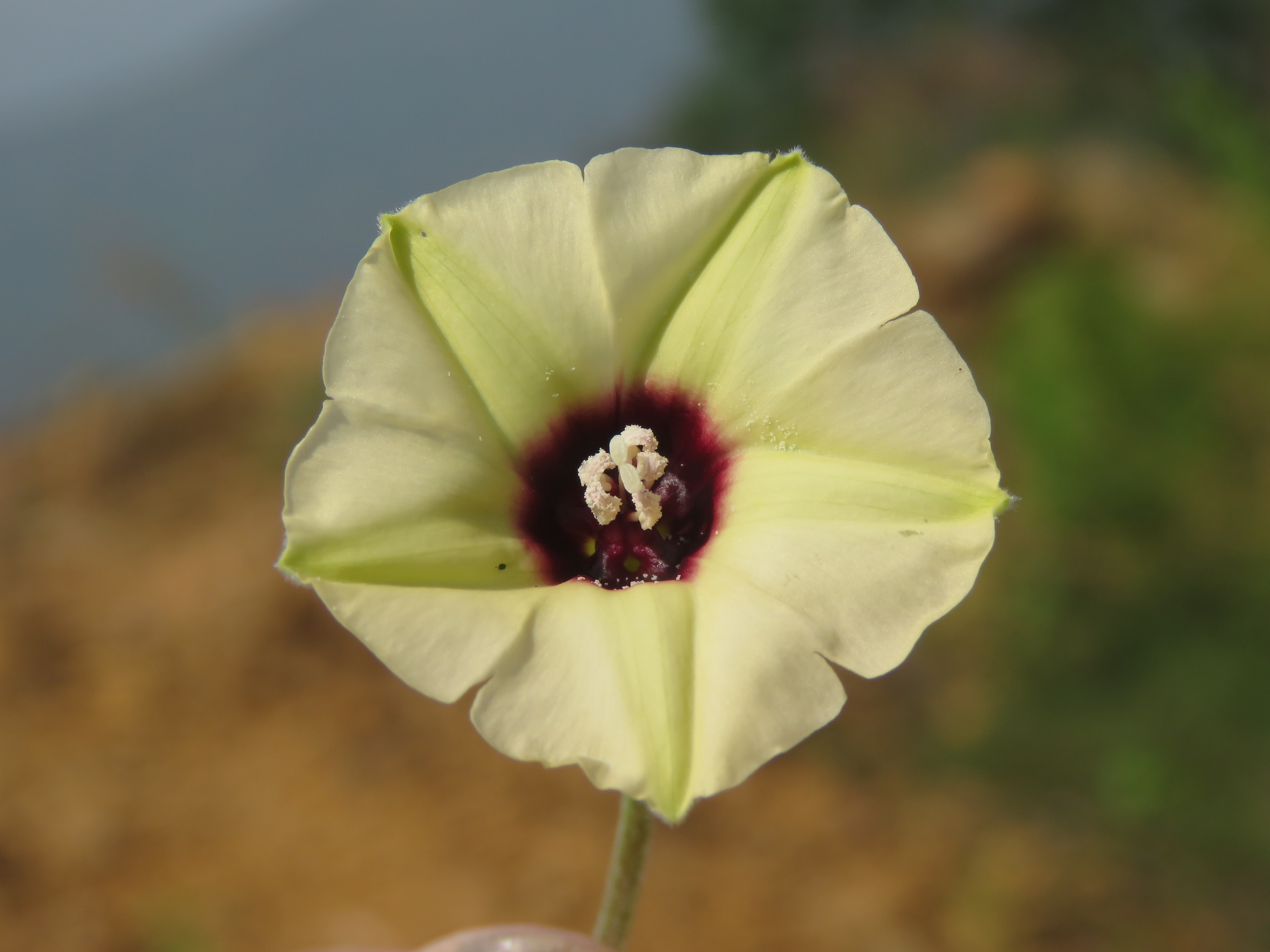
- Hewittia malabarica, from Mitomoni area, Tanzania.

Scientific classification
- Kingdom: Plantae
- Clade: Embryophytes
- Clade: Tracheophytes
- Clade: Angiosperms
- Clade: Eudicots
- Clade: Asterids
- Order: Solanales
- Family: Convolvulaceae
- Genus: Hewittia; Wight & Arn.
- Species: H. malabarica

Binomial name
- Hewittia malabarica (L.) Suresh

Synonyms
- Synonyms: Aniseia afzelii G.Don; Aniseia bracteata Hassk.; Argyreia malabarica (L.) Choisy; Bonamia volkensii Dammer; Calystegia keriana Sweet; Convolvulus bicolor Vahl; Convolvulus bracteatus Vahl; Convolvulus hederaceus Blanco; Convolvulus involucratus Willd; Convolvulus involucratus Ker Gawl; Convolvulus malabaricus L.; Convolvulus rottleri Spreng; Convolvulus scandens Milne; Convolvulus sublobatus L.f.; Convolvulus timorensis D.Dietr.; Eremosperma puccionianum Chiov.; Hewittia asarifolia Klotzsch; Hewittia barbeyana Chod. & Roulet; Hewittia bicolor (Vahl) Wight & Arn.; Hewittia hirta Klotzsch; Hewittia puccioniana (Chiov.) Verdc.; Hewittia scandens (Milne) Mabb.; Hewittia sublobata (L.f.) Kuntze; Ipomoea benguelensis Baker; Ipomoea bicolor Sweet; Ipomoea bracteata Roem. & Schult.; Ipomoea malabarica (L.) Roem. & Schult.; Ipomoea pandurifolia E.Mey.; Ipomoea phyllosepala Baker; Ipomoea schultesii Weinm. ex Choisy; Ipomoea teretistigma Choisy; Ipomoea weinmannii Roem. & Schult.; Kethosia involucrata (Willd.) Raf.; Palmia bicolor (Choisy) Endl. ex Dalzell & Gibson; Sanilum bicolor Raf.; Sanilum bracteatum Raf.; Shutereia bicolor Choisy; Shutereia sublobata (L.f.) House

= Hewittia malabarica =

Species of flowering plant

Hewittia malabarica is a flowering plant in the monotypic genus Hewittia Wight & Arn., belonging to the family Convolvulaceae and widespread throughout tropical Africa, Asia, and Polynesia. It is a climbing or prostrate perennial herb with slender stems and flowers that are pale yellow, cream, or white with a purple center, and large leaves that can be used as a cooked vegetable or used in folk medicine with the roots. The stems can be used to make ropes.

== Description ==
Hewittia malabarica is close in form to some Convolvulus species. It is a twining, climbing or prostrate, herbaceous perennial plant. with a stem that is velvet-hairy or pubescent (covered in downy hairs) and slender that is up to 1–3 m (3 ft 3 in – 9 ft 10 in) long. These long stems can twin or climb into the surrounding vegetation, or they scramble over the ground where they occasionally form new roots at the nodes.

The leaves are arranged alternately, with a petiole (leaf stalk) that is between 1–9 cm (0–4 in) long. They are oblong to obovate (teardrop) shaped, and 2–14 cm (1–6 in) long, and 3–10 cm (1–4 in) wide, with an entire (smooth) or dentate (toothed) edge and an acuminate (with a long point) apex. They are pilose (having soft separate hairs) to velvety (hairy on the surface), with a cordate (heart shaped) or hastate (shaped like an halberd) base.

In Pondoland, Cape Province, South Africa, it blooms in May, whereas in China, it flowers and fruits nearly all year.

the 1-3 axillary (arising from the axil) flowers borne on each cyme are found near the leaf joint,. Each flower is bracteate (with bracts), with a peduncle (flower stalk) between 1.5–10 cm (1–4 in) long. The bracts are oblong-lanceolate shaped, 0.7–1.5 cm (0–1 in) long, pubescent (covered with short, soft hairs) and acuminate (tapering to a point). The inflorescences are bisexual (bearing both male and female reproductive organs), with a pedicel (flower stalk) up to 3 cm long. It has 5 sepals, which are lanceolate to ovate shaped and up to 17 mm long. The outer 3 are much larger than the inner 2 sepals, and it can be identified from other similar coloured morning glory flowers by its overlapping sepals. The corolla (the collective term for the petals) are campanulate (bell-shaped,) to funnel-shaped, 2–3.5 cm (1–1 in) long. They are pale yellow, cream or white with a purple center, The petals are pilose (covered with soft, weak, thin, and separated hairs) on the outside in 5 bands.

The stamens are about 9 mm long, located within the corolla tube and also enclosed. It has a superior ovary (located above the flower), which is 1 or 2 celled, and hairy, or villous (covered with long, soft, straight hairs). The style is filiform (thread-like) and the 2 stigmas are ovate-oblong shaped. The anthers are ovoid-deltoid shaped.

After flowering it produces a seed capsule (or fruit), which is depressed globose (almost spherical) to quadrangular (almost square). It is pilose (has soft separate hairs), has 4 valves and measures about 8–10 mm (0–0 in) in diameter. Inside are 2-4 black, sub-globose seeds, which are 3–6 mm (0–0 in) in diameter. It has a persistent style.

=== Biochemistry ===
It has a chromosome no. = 2n=30.

== Taxonomy ==
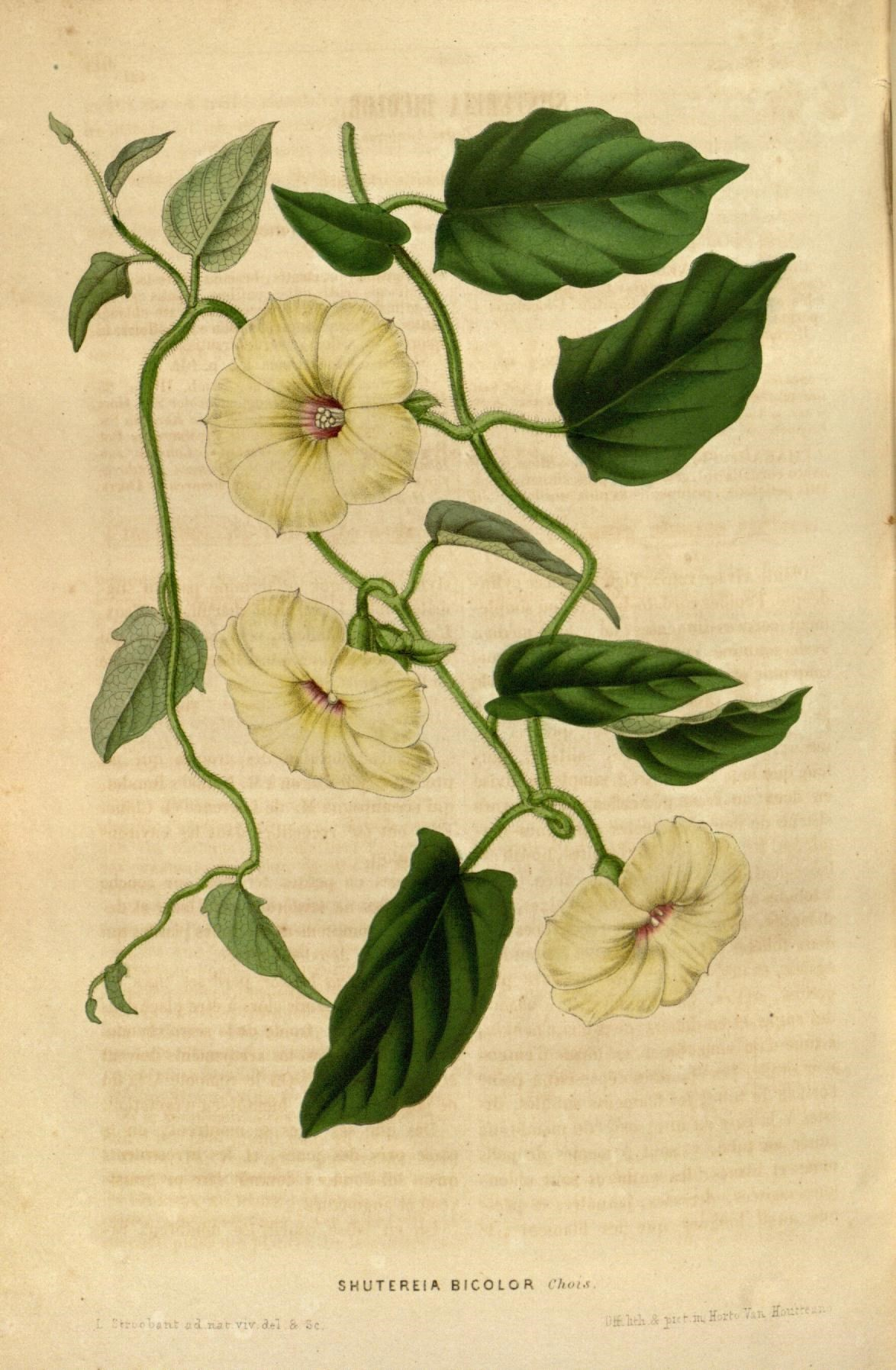
Illustration of Hewittia malabarica, from 1848

In China, it is known as 'zhu cai teng' and in India as 'paymoostey'. In India, it has the common name Malabar Bindweed. It is also known as 'Hewitt's Dwarf Morning Glory' in South Africa.

The genus name, Hewittia, is in honour of Hewett Watson (1804–1881), an English phrenologist, botanist and evolutionary theorist. The Latin specific epithet malabarica is the feminine form of malabaricus, meaning coming from or related to Malabar, India.

Hewittia malabarica was originally described and published by D.H.Nicolson, C.R.Suresh & K.S.Manilal in 'An Interpretation of Van Rheede's Hortus Malabaricus' on page 88 in 1988.

The genus Hewittia has several synonyms including Eremosperma Chiov., Kethosia Raf., Palmia Endl., Sanilum Raf. and Shutereia Choisy. It was first published in Madras J. Lit. Sci. Vol.5 on page 22 in 1837. The genus is recognized by the United States Department of Agriculture and the Agricultural Research Service, but they do not list any known species. The synonyms of the species are listed in the taxobox (top righthand corner).

== Distribution and habitat ==
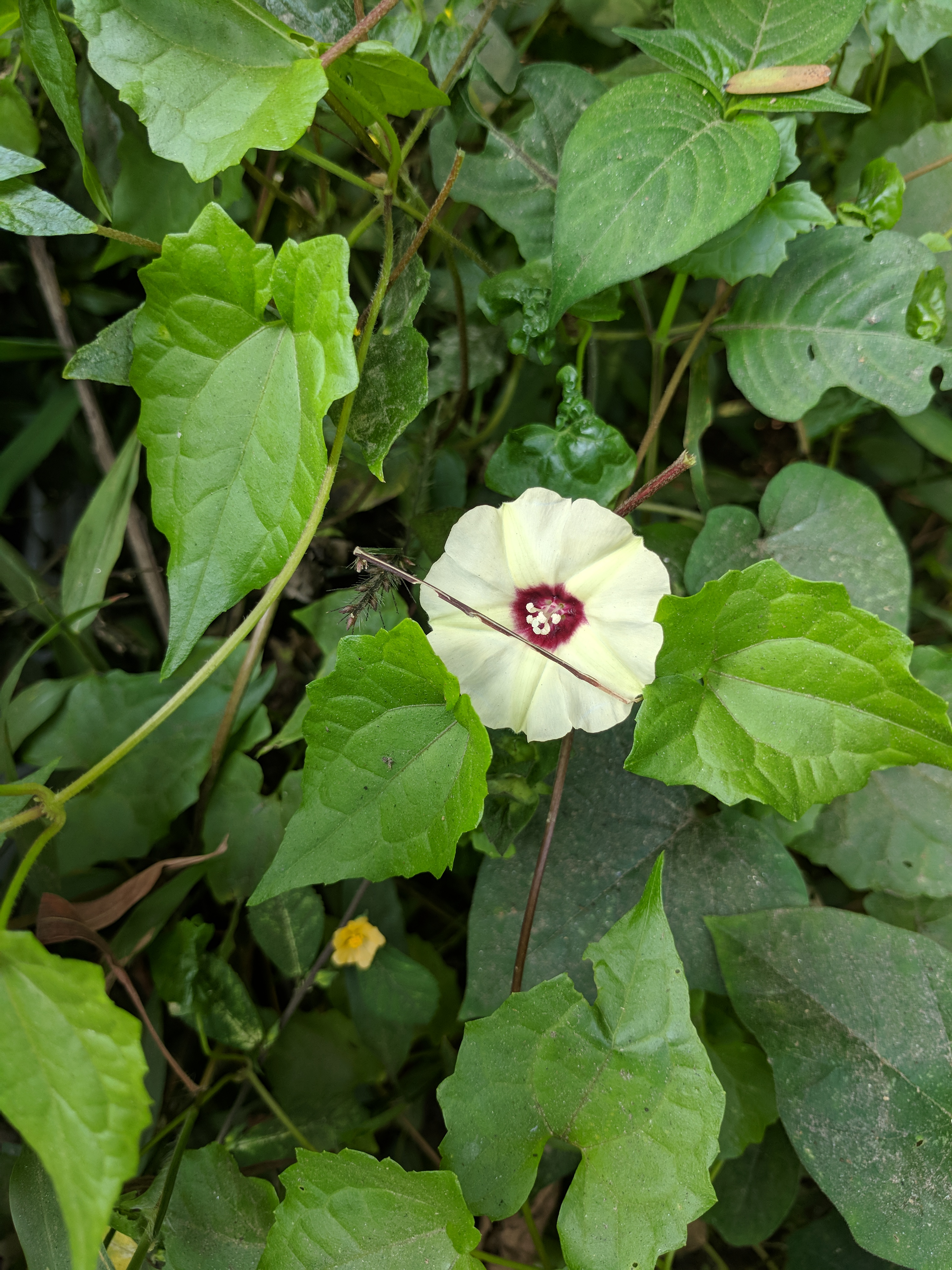
Hewittia malabarica named as Hewittia scandens

=== Range ===
Its widespread native range is the Tropical & subtropical Old World, which includes throughout tropical Africa, Asia and Polynesia.

It is found in the countries of Angola, Bangladesh, Benin, Borneo, Burundi, Cambodia, Cameroon, Central African Republic, Chad, China (south-central and south-east, in Guangdong, Guangxi, Hainan, and Yunnan,), Eswatini, Ethiopia, Gabon, Gambia, Ghana, Guinea, Hainan (a province of China), India (including Assam), Ivory Coast, Jawa, Kenya, Laos, Lesser Sunda Islands, Liberia, Madagascar, Malawi, Malaya, Mali, Maluku, Mozambique, Myanmar, New Guinea, Nigeria, Philippines, Rwanda, Senegal, Sierra Leone, Somalia, South Africa, (including the regions of the Cape Provinces, the Northern Provinces, and KwaZulu-Natal), Sri Lanka, Sudan, Sumatra, Taiwan, Tanzania, Thailand, Togo, Uganda, Vietnam, Zambia, Zaire and Zimbabwe.

It has been introduced and naturalized in Jamaica.

=== Habitat ===
It grows in grassland, in woodlands and forests (mixed open types), along the edges of forests, in bushveld, forest clearings, along roadsides, along dry watercourses, and along stream banks.

In Africa. it grows at altitudes of 0–1,800 metres (0–5,906 ft) above sea level, in China it only reaches about 600 m. It is considered as a ruderal or agrestal (wild in cultivated fields) weed, in cultivated areas, and waste ground.

== Conservation ==
It is listed as least concern on the Red List of South African Plants.

== Cultivation ==
It can be grown on a wide range of soil types but will grow best in deep sandy loams with permanent moisture.

In Tanzania, the plant grows in areas where the mean annual rainfall is in the range of 1,100 - 2,100 mm. It also grows in areas with a pronounced dry season and also in those with almost no dry season.

It can be grown from seed.

== Uses ==
It has various uses; as well as being an edible plant, it has medicinal uses, is used in rope making, and is also an ornamental garden plant.

It is used in folk medicine, where the leaves are rubbed on sores.

In the China, the leaf is used in an oral decoction and in baths. A root decoction is drunk to rid the body of Oxyuris or 'threadworms'.

The leaves are used as a cooked vegetable, they are collected from the wild and then cooked. It is often available when other vegetables are scarce.

They are chopped up, boiled, the water is then drained and the vegetable is mixed with pounded groundnuts or coconut milk and eaten with ugali or rice. Alternatively, the leaf is cooked with other vegetables such as Amaranthus or bidens, coconut milk or groundnut paste is then added and the whole mixture is served with a staple such as rice.

In Uganda, they are popular with the Langi people, who use it for a traditional dish called 'onyebe'.

It is also occasionally grown as an ornamental plant and also as a ground cover in plantations. In Madagascar, it is used as a cover-plant in plantations of 'ylang-ylang' (Cananga odorata (Lam.) Hook f. & Thomson) and it is also grazed by cattle. It is used as cattle fodder in Benin with a wide range of other plants. The fiber from the inner bark is also used to make ropes.

== Other sources ==
- Bandeira, S., Bolnick, D. & Barbosa, F. (2007). Wild Flowers of Southern Mozambique Universidade Eduardo Mondlane, Maputo, Mozambique Pages 120 - 121. (Includes a picture).
- Chapano, C. & Mamuto, M. (2003). Plants of the Chimanimani District National Herbarium and Botanic Garden, Zimbabwe Page 31.
- Da Silva, M.C., Izidine, S. & Amude, A.B. (2004). A preliminary checklist of the vascular plants of Mozambique. Southern African Botanical Diversity Network Report No. 30 Sabonet, Pretoria Page 47.
- Gonçalves, M.L. (1987). Convolvulaceae Flora Zambesiaca 8(1) Pages 31 – 32. as Hewittia scandens (Includes a picture).
- Grubben, G. J. H. (2004). Légumes, page 350 (in French)
- Mapaura, A. & Timberlake, J. (eds) (2004). A checklist of Zimbabwean vascular plants Southern African Botanical Diversity Network Report No. 33 Sabonet, Pretoria and Harare Page 36. as Hewittia scandens
- Phiri, P.S.M. (2005). A Checklist of Zambian Vascular Plants Southern African Botanical Diversity Network Report No. 32 Page 43.
- Pooley, E. (1998). A Field Guide to the Wild Flowers of KwaZulu-Natal and the Eastern Region. Natal Flora Publications Trust. Durban. Pages 302 - 303. (Includes a picture).
- Raimondo, D., von Staden, L., Foden, W., Victor, J.E., Helme, N.A., Turner, R.C., Kamundi, D.A. and Manyama, P.A. (2009). Red List of South African Plants. Strelitzia 25. South African National Biodiversity Institute, Pretoria.
- Strugnell, A.M. (2006). A Checklist of the Spermatophytes of Mount Mulanje, Malawi Scripta Botanica Belgica 34 National Botanic Garden of Belgium Page 71. as Hewittia scandens
