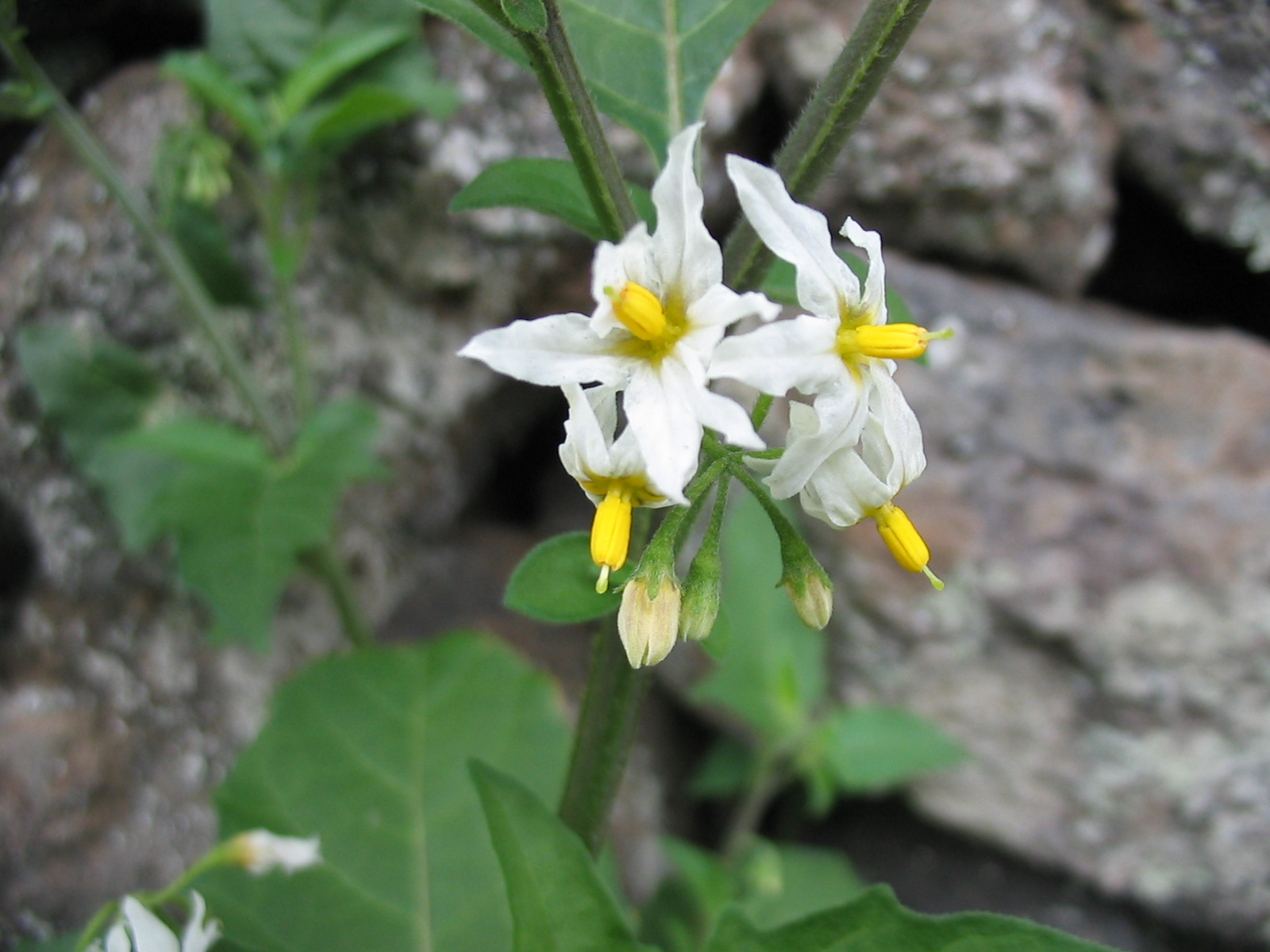

Scientific classification
- Kingdom: Plantae
- Clade: Embryophytes
- Clade: Tracheophytes
- Clade: Spermatophytes
- Clade: Angiosperms
- Clade: Eudicots
- Clade: Asterids
- Order: Solanales
- Family: Solanaceae
- Genus: Solanum
- Species: S. chenopodioides

Binomial name
- Solanum chenopodioides Lam.

= Solanum chenopodioides =

Species of shrub

Solanum chenopodioides, commonly known as the whitetip nightshade or velvety nightshade, is a shrub of the family Solanaceae native to South America. It has become naturalised in North America, Europe, Australia, and New Zealand.
