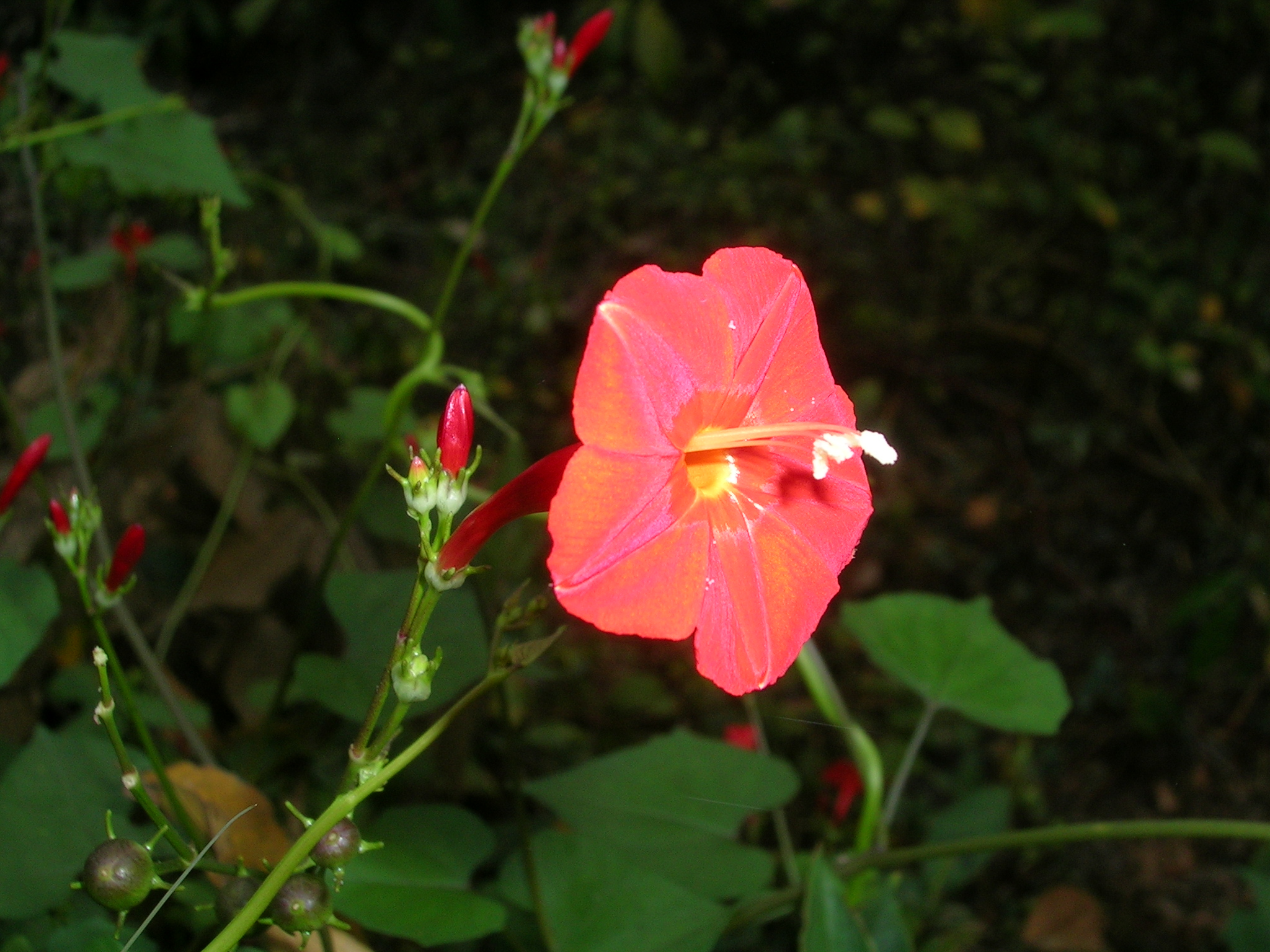

Scientific classification
- Kingdom: Plantae
- Clade: Tracheophytes
- Clade: Angiosperms
- Clade: Eudicots
- Clade: Asterids
- Order: Solanales
- Family: Convolvulaceae
- Genus: Ipomoea
- Species: I. hederifolia

Binomial name
- Ipomoea hederifolia L.

Synonyms
- Ipomoea coccinea Sessé & Moc. (non L.: preoccupied); Ipomoea coccinea var. hederifolia (L.) Gray; Ipomoea luteola Jacq.

= Ipomoea hederifolia =

Scarlet creeper

Species of flowering plant

Ipomoea hederifolia is a species of herbaceous annual vine native to the Americas. It was first described by Linnaeus in 1759.

It is commonly known as scarlet morning glory, scarlet creeper, star ipomoea, trompillo or ivy-leaved morning glory (which otherwise refers to I. hederacea).
