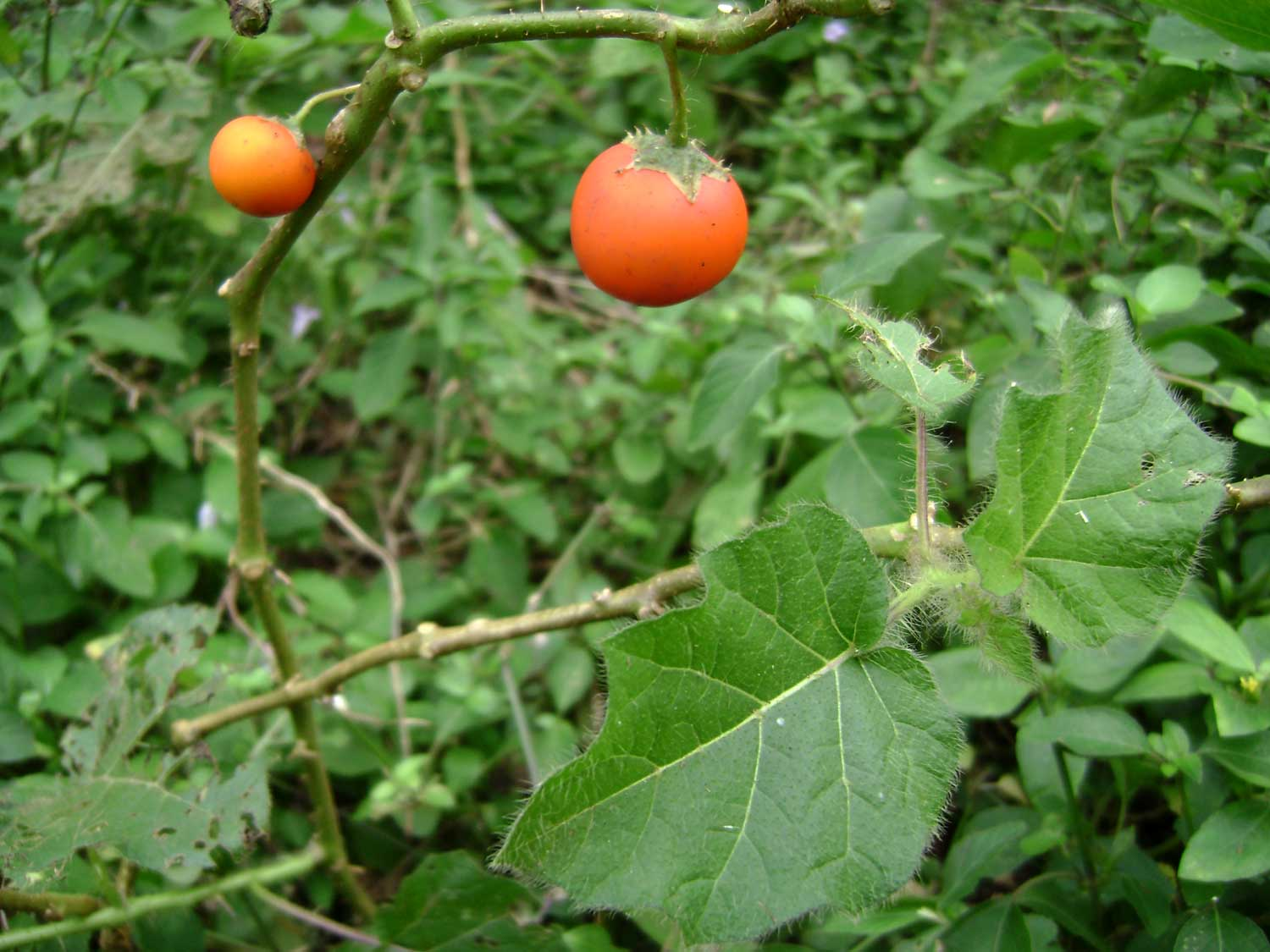

Conservation status
- Apparently Secure (NatureServe)

Scientific classification
- Kingdom: Plantae
- Clade: Embryophytes
- Clade: Tracheophytes
- Clade: Angiosperms
- Clade: Eudicots
- Clade: Asterids
- Order: Solanales
- Family: Solanaceae
- Genus: Solanum
- Species: S. capsicoides

Binomial name
- Solanum capsicoides All.

Synonyms
- See text

= Solanum capsicoides =

Cockroach berry

Species of flowering plant

Solanum capsicoides, the cockroach berry, is a species of flowering plant in the family Solanaceae. It is native to eastern Brazil but naturalized in other tropical regions, where it sometimes becomes an invasive weed.

== Synonyms ==
This species had been included in S. aculeatissimum as variety denudatum by Dunal (Solanum denudatum of Bitter is S. humile as described by Lamarck). It was also included in the eggplant (S. melongena) under its junior synonym S. trongum (as var. sinuato-pinnatifidum), also by Dunal.

In addition, the cockroach berry is sometimes referenced under the following obsolete names:

- Solanum arrebenta Vell.
- Solanum bodinieri H.Lév. & Vaniot
- Solanum capsicoides Hort. Paris ex Lam. (preoccupied)
- Solanum ciliare Willd.
- Solanum ciliatum Lam.

S. ciliatum of Blume from F.A.W. Miquel is an undetermined species of Lycianthes.

- Solanum ciliatum var. arenarium Dunal

S. arenarium of Schur is S. villosum as described by Philip Miller.
S. arenarium of Otto Sendtner is a valid species

- Solanum macowanii Fourc.
- Solanum pentapetaloides Roxb. ex Hornem.

S. pentapetaloides of Bojer from Dunal in de Candolle is S. imamense.

- Solanum pentapetalum Schltdl.
- Solanum sinuatifolium Vell.
- Solanum sphaerocarpum Moric.

== Footnotes ==
- Pacific Island Ecosystems at Risk (PIER) (2007): Solanum capsicoides. Version of 2007-MAR-21. Retrieved 2007-SEP-15.
- Solanaceae Source (2006): Solanum sessiliflorum. Version of May 2006. Retrieved 2008-SEP-26.
