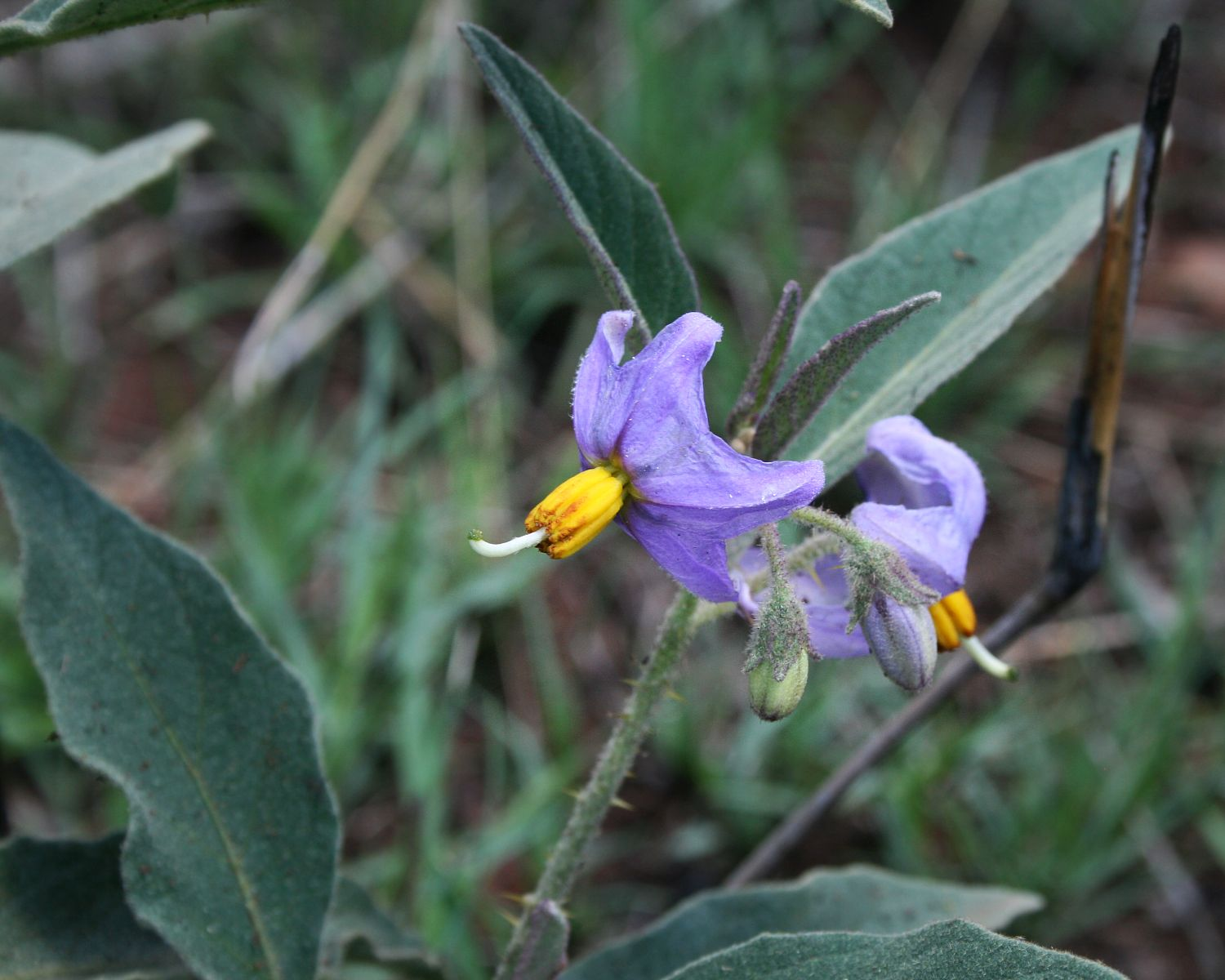

Scientific classification
- Kingdom: Plantae
- Clade: Tracheophytes
- Clade: Angiosperms
- Clade: Eudicots
- Clade: Asterids
- Order: Solanales
- Family: Solanaceae
- Genus: Solanum
- Species: S. campylacanthum

Binomial name
- Solanum campylacanthum Hochst. ex A. Rich.

Synonyms
- List: Solanum antidotum Dammer; Solanum astrochlaenoides Dammer; Solanum benguelense Peyr.; Solanum beniense De Wild.; Solanum bojeri Dunal; Solanum bussei Dammer; Solanum cufodontii Lanza; Solanum deckenii Dammer; Solanum delagoense Dunal; Solanum delpierrei De Wild.; Solanum endlichii Dammer; Solanum fischeri Dammer; Solanum goniocalyx Lanza; Solanum himatacanthum Dammer; Solanum iodes Dammer; Solanum lachneion Dammer; Solanum macrosepalum Dammer; Solanum magdalenae Dammer; Solanum malacochlamys Bitter; Solanum maranguense Bitter; Solanum melongenifolium Lanza; Solanum merkeri Dammer; Solanum mesomorphum Bitter; Solanum mossambicense Klotzsch; Solanum mossambicensis Klotzsch; Solanum neumanni Dammer; Solanum obliquum Dammer; Solanum ochracanthum Bitter; Solanum omahekense Dammer; Solanum omitiomirense Dammer; Solanum panduriforme Drège ex Dunal; Solanum pembae Bitter; Solanum pentheri Gand.; Solanum pharmacum Klotzsch; Solanum phoricum Klotzsch; Solanum psilostylum Dammer; Solanum repandifrons Bitter; Solanum secedens Dammer; Solanum sennii Chiov.; Solanum stellativillosum Bitter; Solanum suaveolens Bojer; Solanum tabacicolor Dammer; Solanum tomentellum Klotzsch; Solanum trepidans C.H.Wright; Solanum tuntula De Wild.; Solanum ukerewense Bitter; Solanum urbanianum Dammer; Solanum verbascifrons Bitter; Solanum volkensii Dammer

= Solanum campylacanthum =

Species of flowering plant

Solanum campylacanthum is a species of flowering plant in the nightshade family Solanaceae.

The species is very common and is widespread in grasslands, savannas, and woodlands. It can be found in eastern, central and southern Africa.

The fruit of this species are poisonous but they have been used in traditional medicine.
