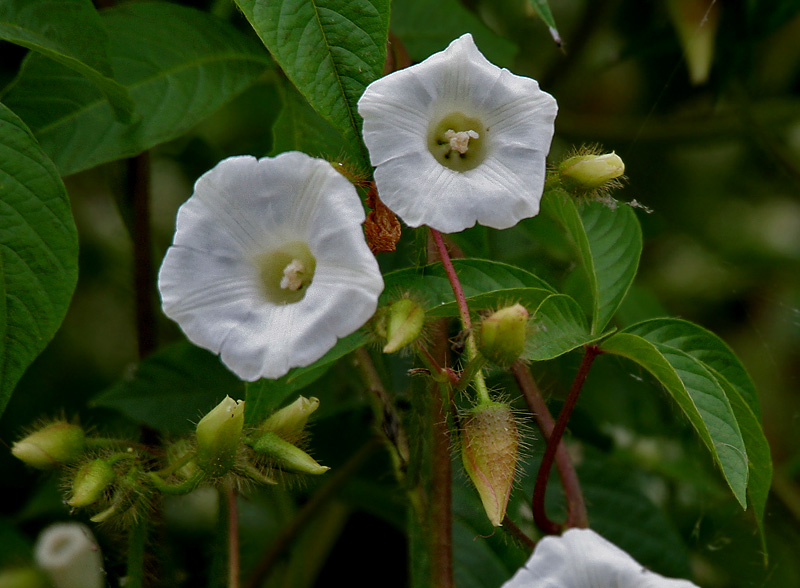
- Merremia aegyptia growing in Hyderabad, India

Scientific classification
- Kingdom: Plantae
- Clade: Tracheophytes
- Clade: Angiosperms
- Clade: Eudicots
- Clade: Asterids
- Order: Solanales
- Family: Convolvulaceae
- Genus: Merremia; Dennst. ex Endl.

Species
- See text

Synonyms
- Astromerremia Pilg.; Skinneria Choisy; Spiranthera Bojer

= Merremia =

Genus of flowering plants

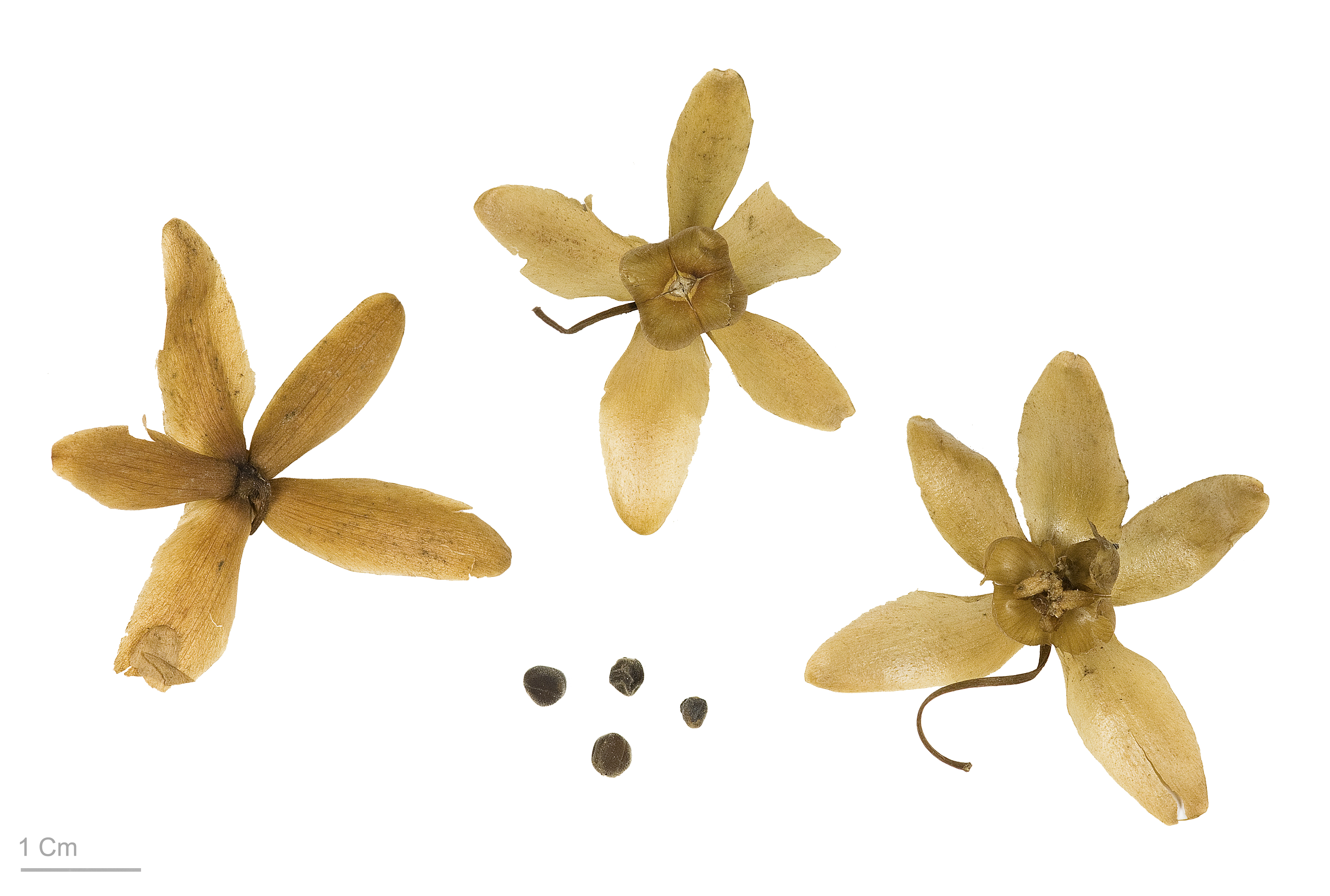
Merremia aegyptia - MHNT

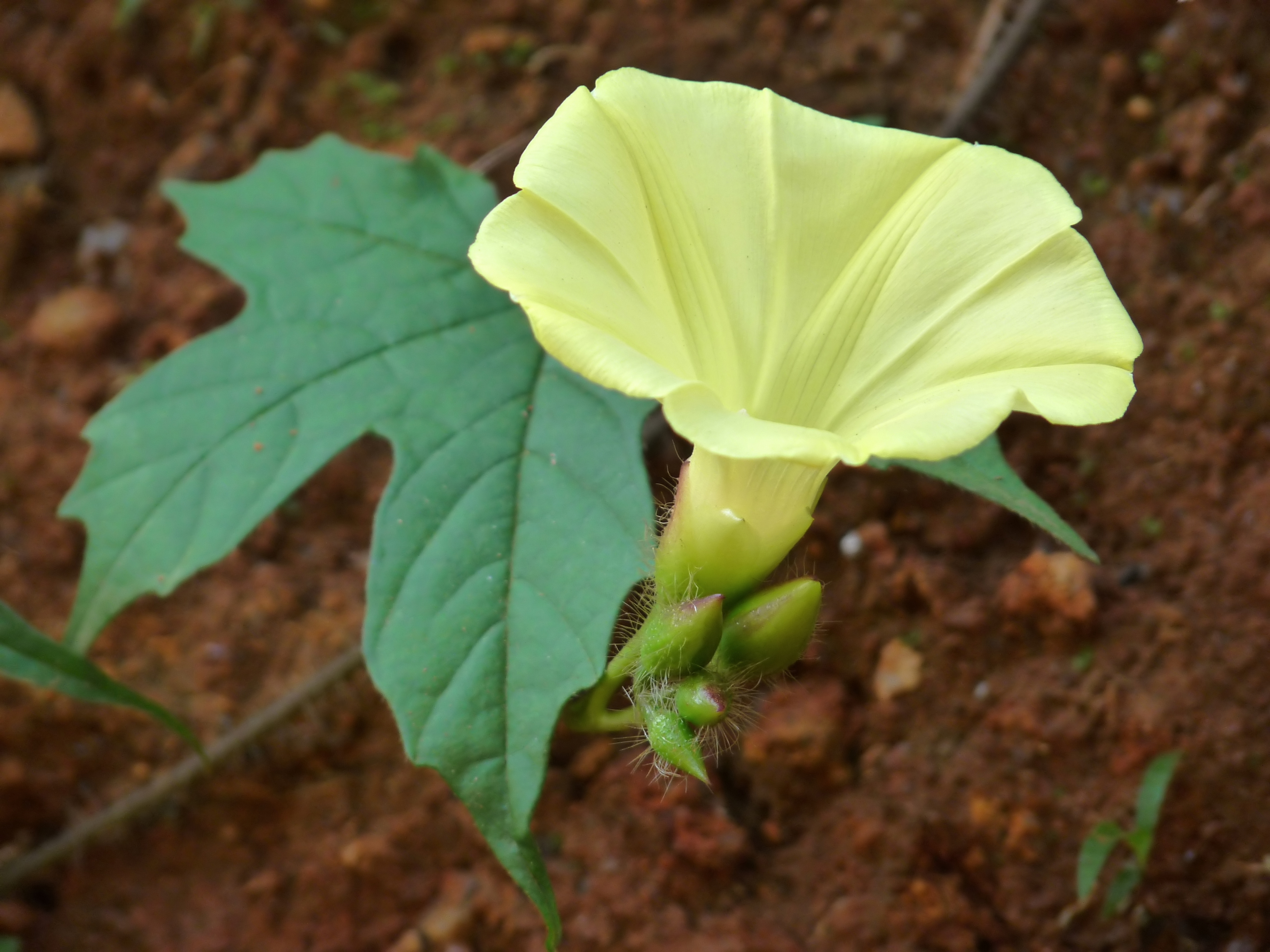
Merremia vitifolia, Kerala

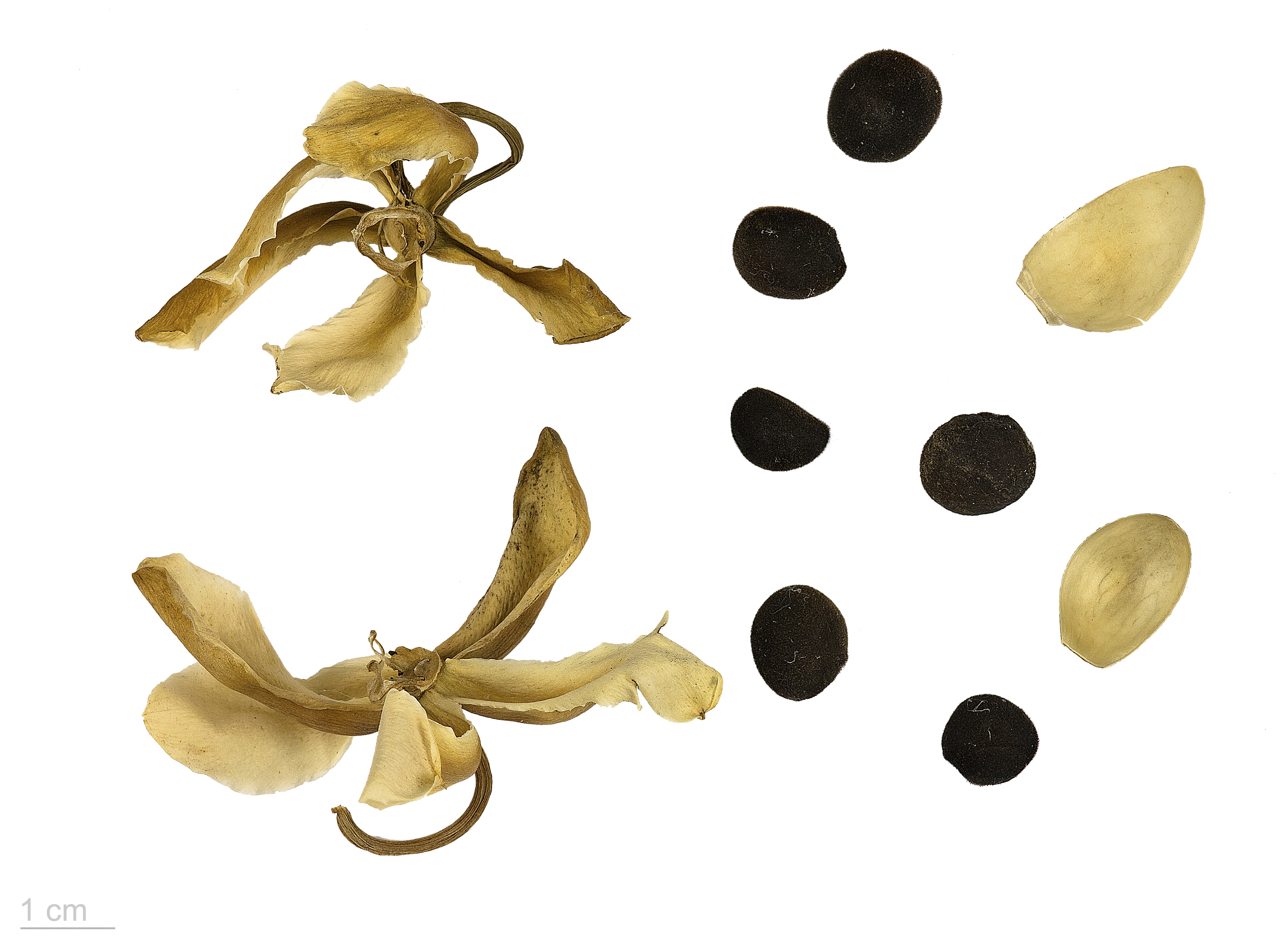
Merremia aurea - MHNT

Merremia is a genus of flowering plants in the morning glory family, Convolvulaceae. Members of the genus are commonly known as woodroses.

== Species ==
The following species are recognised in the genus Merremia:

- M. aniseiifolia Ooststr. – hairy woodrose
- M. caloxantha (Diels) Staples & R.C.Fang
- M. calycina (Meisn.) Hallier f.
- M. calyculata Ooststr.
- M. candei (A.Terracc.) Sebsebe
- M. clemensiana Ooststr. – roadside woodrose
- M. cordata C.Y.Wu & R.C.Fang
- M. crassinervia Ooststr.
- M. dichotoma Ooststr.
- M. discoidesperma (Donn.Sm.) O'Donell
- M. ellenbeckii Pilg.
- M. emarginata (Burm.f.) Hallier f.
- M. gallabatensis Hallier f.
- M. gemella (Burm.f.) Hallier f.
- M. gorinii Chiov.
- M. gracilis E.J.F.Campb. & Argent
- M. grandidentata (C.H.Thomps.) Staples & Simões
- M. gregorii Rendle
- M. hainanensis H.S.Kiu
- M. hederacea (Burm.f.) Hallier f. (type) – ivy woodrose
- M. hemmingiana Verdc.
- M. hirta (L.) Merr.
- M. hornbyi Verdc.
- M. incisa (R.Br.) Hallier f.
- M. malvifolia Rendle
- M. martini (H.Lév.) Staples & Simões
- M. obtusa (Verdc.) Thulin
- M. palmata Hallier f.
- M. pavonii (Hallier f.) D.F.Austin & Staples
- M. platyphylla (Fernald) O'Donell
- M. poranoides (C.B.Clarke) Hallier f.
- M. porrecta Pilg.
- M. pterygocaulos (Choisy) Hallier f.
- M. rajasthanensis Bhandari
- M. retusa (Baker) Manitz – rock rosemary
- M. setisepala Verdc.
- M. sibirica (L.) Hallier f.
- M. spongiosa Rendle
- M. steenisii Ooststr.
- M. subsessilis (Courchet & Gagnep.) T.N.Nguyen
- M. thorelii (Gagnep.) Staples
- M. truncata Verdc.
- M. verdcourtiana Lejoly & Lisowski
- M. verecunda Rendle
- M. verruculosa S.Y.Liu
- M. warderensis Sebsebe.
- M. wurdackii D.F.Austin & Staples
- M. xanthophylla Hallier f.
- M. yunnanensis (Courchet & Gagnep.) R.C.Fang

=== Formerly placed here ===
- Operculina turpethum (L.) Silva Manso (as M. turpethum (L.) Rendle)
- Xenostegia medium (L.) D.F.Austin & Staples (as M. medium (L.) Hallier f.)
- Xenostegia tridentata (L.) D.F.Austin & Staples (as M. tridentata (L.) Hallier f.)

=== Uses ===
In the Indigenous system of Medicine, Ipomoea reniformis chois is also known as Merremia emarginata (Burm.f.) Hallier f. has been claimed to be useful for cough, headache, neuralgia, rheumatism, diuretic, inflammation, fever due to enlargement of liver and also in kidney diseases. The tribal people use this plant for deobstruent, diuretic, rheumatism, neuralgia, cancerous wounds, migraine, purgative, snake bites, ulcer, abscesses and glandular swelling.
