= Ipomoea reptans =

Ipomoea reptans can refer to:

- Ipomoea reptans Anon., a synonym of Ipomoea aquatica Forssk. var. aquatica
- Ipomoea reptans (L.) Poir. ex G.Don., a synonym of Merremia hirta (L.) Merr. var. hirta
