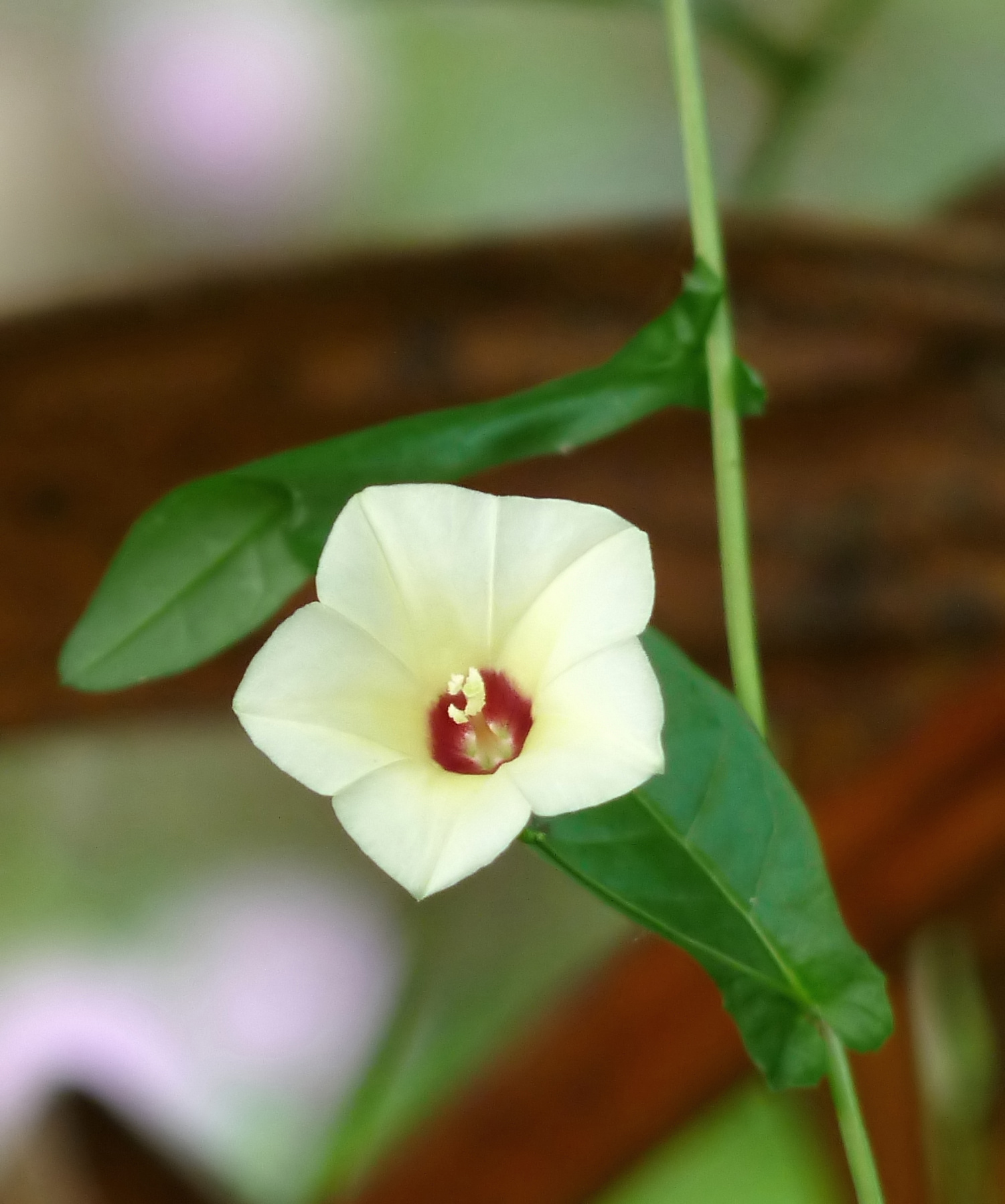
- Xenostegia tridentata, arrow-leaf morning glory

Scientific classification
- Kingdom: Plantae
- Clade: Tracheophytes
- Clade: Angiosperms
- Clade: Eudicots
- Clade: Asterids
- Order: Solanales
- Family: Convolvulaceae
- Genus: Xenostegia; D.F.Austin & Staples

Species
- See text

= Xenostegia =

Genus of Convolvulaceae plants

Xenostegia, the morningvines, are a genus of flowering plants in the bindweed and morning glory family Convolvulaceae, found across the Old World Tropics and Subtropics, from Africa, Madagascar, the Indian Subcontinent, southern Asia and Australia.

== Species ==
Currently accepted species include:

- Xenostegia alatipes (Dammer) A.R.Simões & Staples
- Xenostegia lomamiensis Sosef & Gereau
- Xenostegia medium (L.) D.F.Austin & Staples
- Xenostegia pinnata (Hochst. ex Choisy) A.R.Simões & Staples
- Xenostegia sapinii (De Wild.) A.R.Simões & Staples
- Xenostegia tridentata (L.) D.F.Austin & Staples
