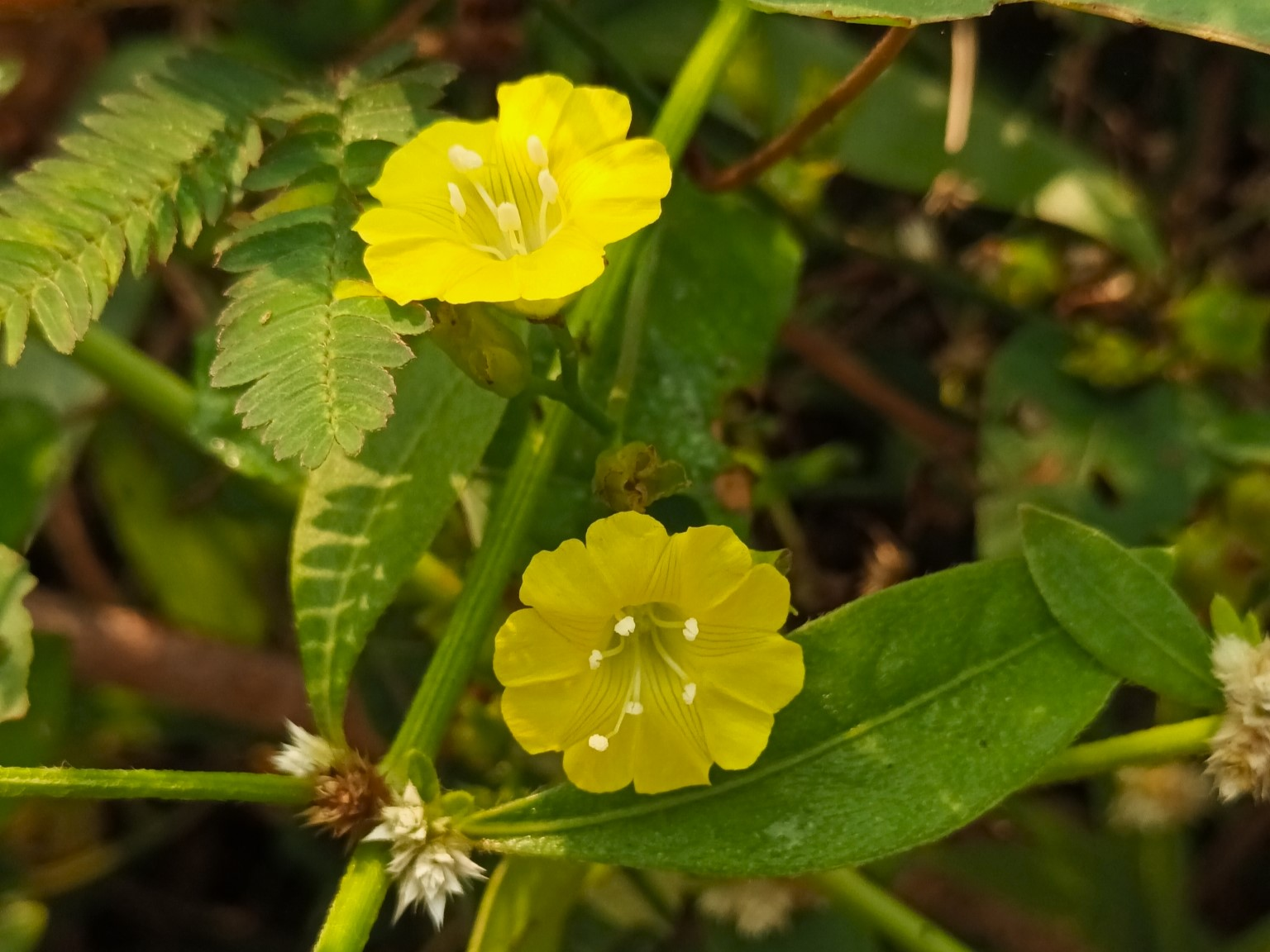

Scientific classification
- Kingdom: Plantae
- Clade: Tracheophytes
- Clade: Angiosperms
- Clade: Eudicots
- Clade: Asterids
- Order: Solanales
- Family: Convolvulaceae
- Genus: Merremia
- Species: M. hederacea

Binomial name
- Merremia hederacea (Burm.f.) Hallier f.
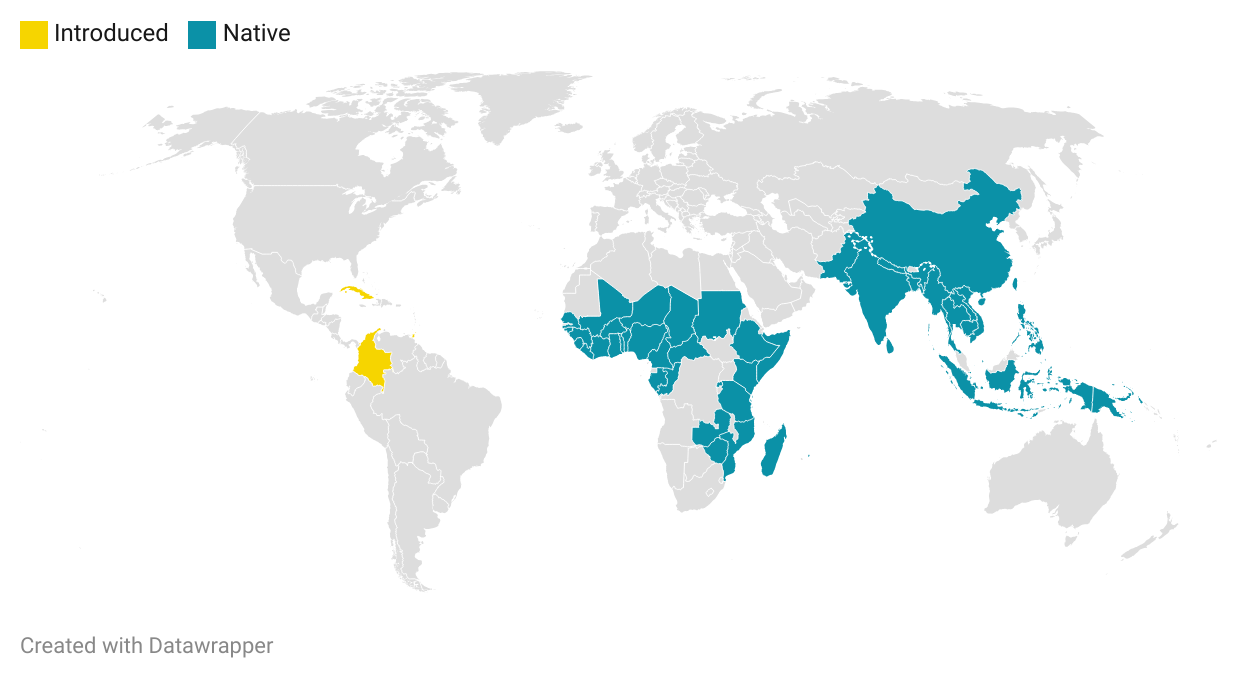

Synonyms
- Evolvulus hederaceus; Ipomoea chryseides; Merremia chryseides; Merremia convolvulacea

= Merremia hederacea =

Species of plant

Merremia hederacea, the ivy woodrose, is a flowering vine of the family Convolvulaceae native to tropical and subtropical Old World to Pacific. M. hederacea has a wide range of distribution, found naturally in tropical and subtropical Old World, but introduced to Colombia, Cuba, Trinidad etc.

== Gallery ==
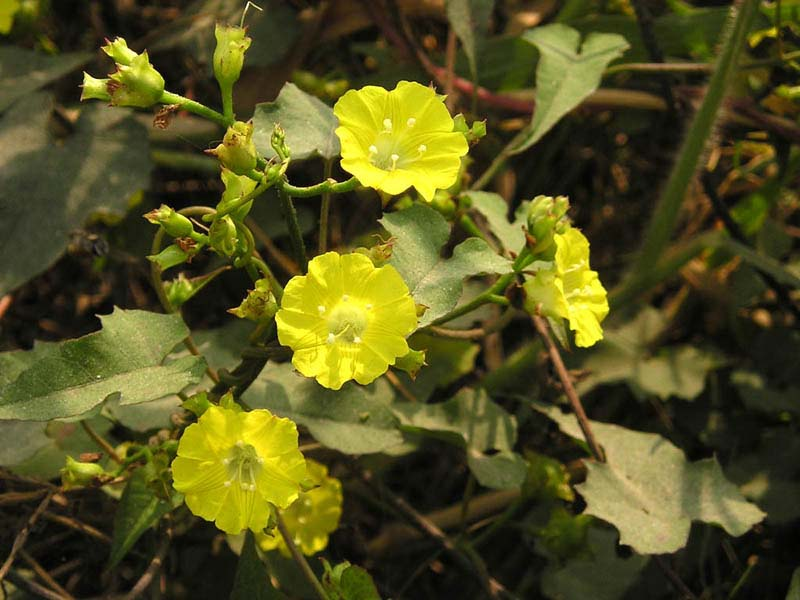
Flowers

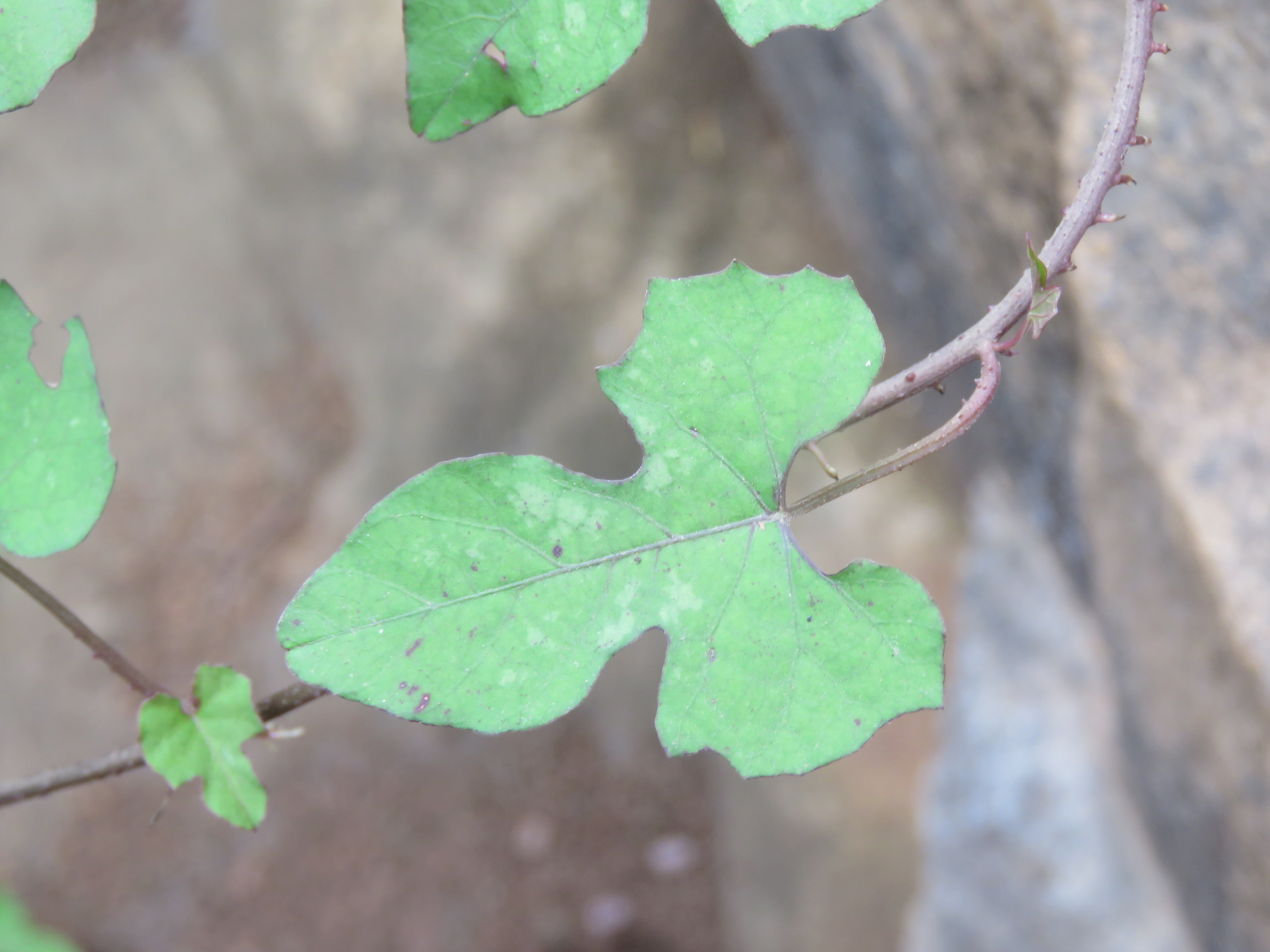
Leaf

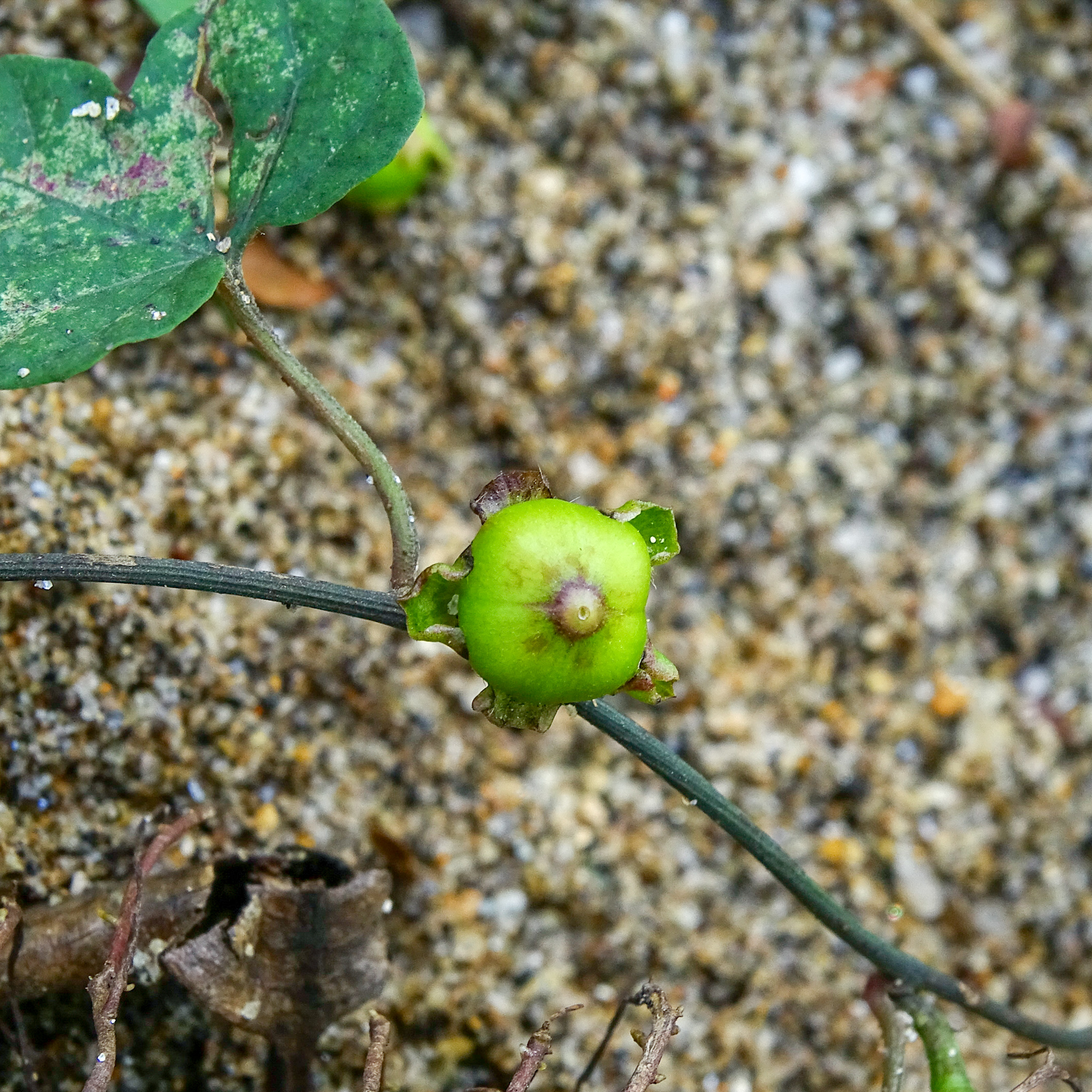
Fruit

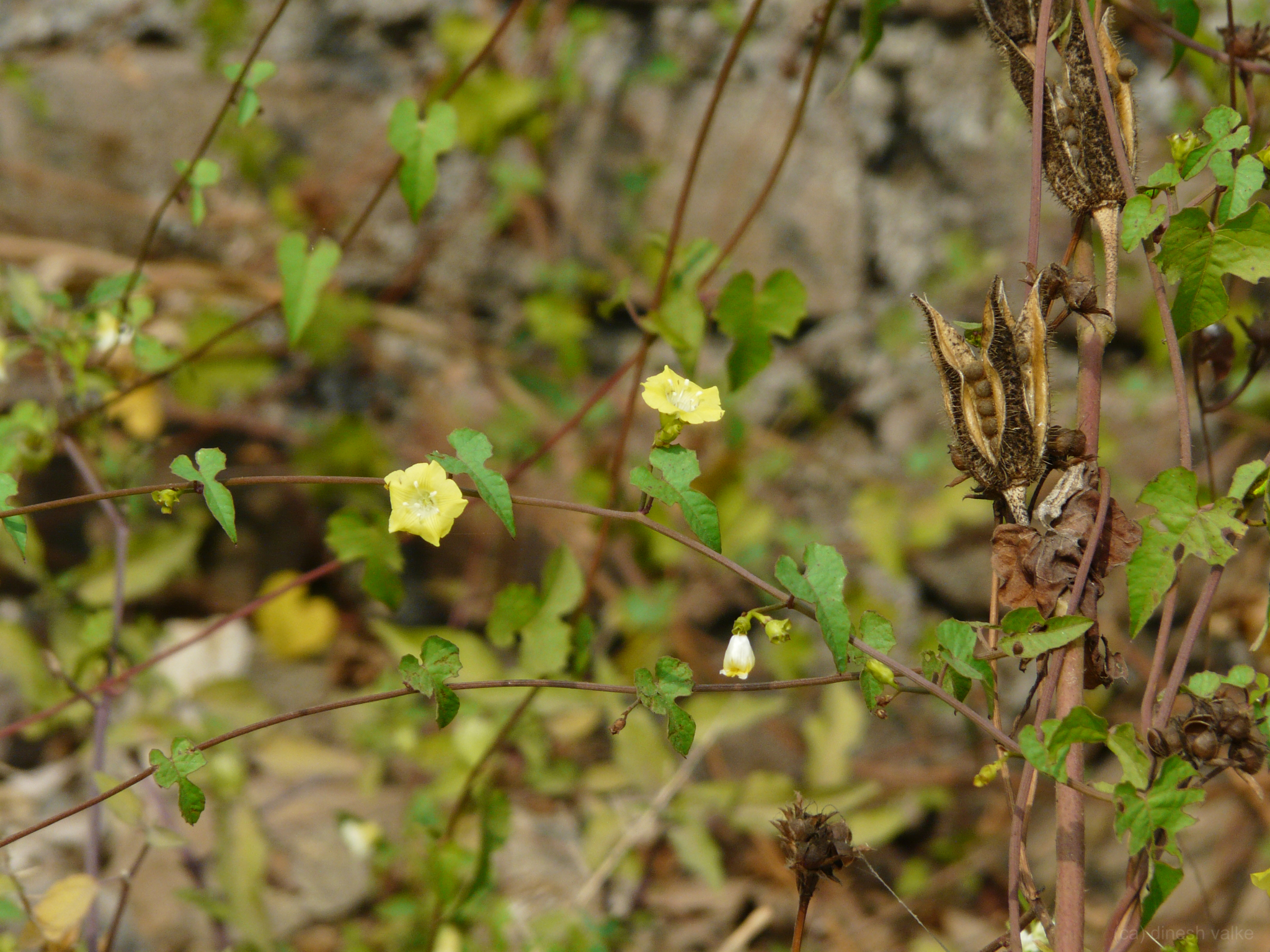
