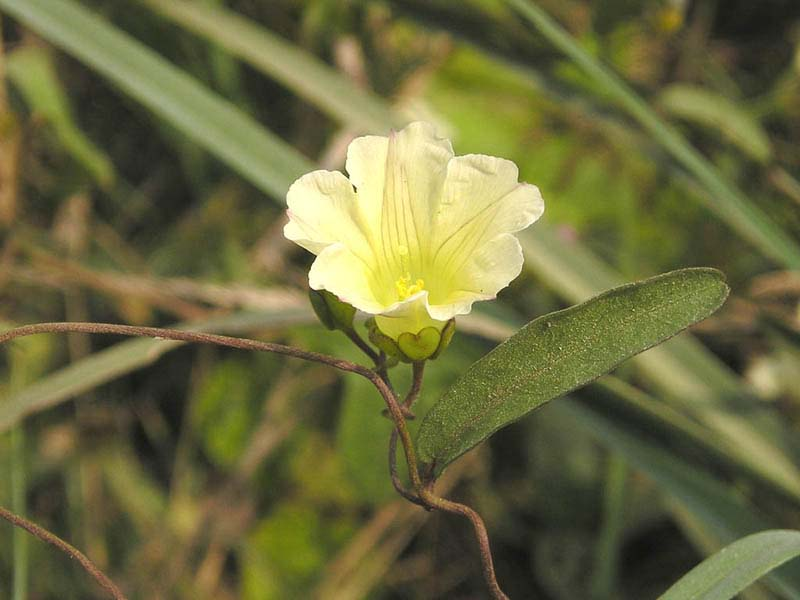
- Flower

Scientific classification
- Kingdom: Plantae
- Clade: Tracheophytes
- Clade: Angiosperms
- Clade: Eudicots
- Clade: Asterids
- Order: Solanales
- Family: Convolvulaceae
- Genus: Merremia
- Species: M. hirta

Binomial name
- Merremia hirta (L.) Merr.

Synonyms
- List: Convolvulus benthamii Wall.; Convolvulus cespitosus Roxb.; Convolvulus hirtus L.; Convolvulus hybridus Zoll. & Moritzi; Convolvulus linifolius (Blume) D.Dietr.; Convolvulus pratensis Buch.-Ham. ex Choisy; Convolvulus reptans L.; Hewittia cespitosa (Roxb.) Steud.; Ipomoea cespitosa (Roxb.) Sweet; Ipomoea hepaticifolia Blanco; Ipomoea linifolia Blume; Ipomoea philippinensis Choisy; Ipomoea reptans (L.) Poir. ex G.Don.; Ipomoea setulosa Zoll. & Moritzi; Lepistemon decurrens Hand.-Mazz.; Merremia cespitosa (Roxb.) Hallier f.; Merremia decurrens (Hand.-Mazz.) H.S.Kiu; Skinneria cespitosa (Roxb.) Choisy

= Merremia hirta =

Species of plant

Merremia hirta is a species of flowering plant in the family Convolvulaceae, native to India, southern China, Southeast Asia, Malesia, Papuasia, and Queensland. A twining herb, it is typically found in well-lit situations; grasslands, farm fields, roadsides, thickets, and forest edges, from sea level to 1,000 m (3,300 ft).

== Subtaxa ==
The following subtaxa are accepted:

- Merremia hirta var. hirta – entire range
- Merremia hirta var. retusa Ooststr. – Philippines
