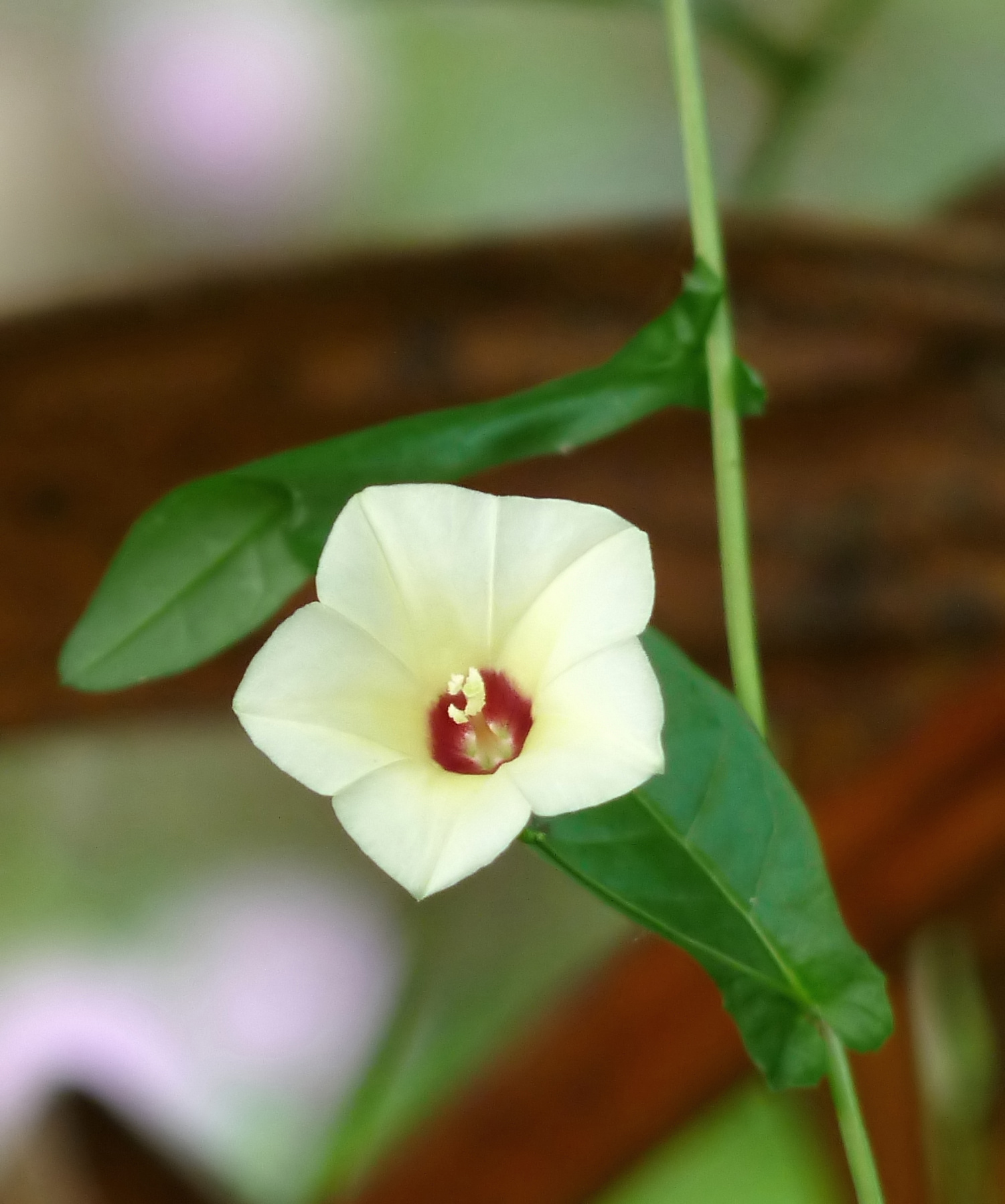

Scientific classification
- Kingdom: Plantae
- Clade: Tracheophytes
- Clade: Angiosperms
- Clade: Eudicots
- Clade: Asterids
- Order: Solanales
- Family: Convolvulaceae
- Genus: Xenostegia
- Species: X. tridentata

Binomial name
- Xenostegia tridentata (L.) D.F.Austin & Staples

Synonyms
- Convolvulus oligodontus Baker; Merremia tridentata (L.) Hallier f.; Evolvulus tridentatus (L.) L.; Ipomoea angustifolia Jacq.; Ipomoea tridentata (L.) Roth; Merremia alatipes Dammer; Merremia angustifolia Hallier f.; Merremia hastata Hallier f.; Merremia tridentata subsp. angustifolia (Jacq.) Ooststr.; Merremia tridentata subsp. hastata (Hallier f.) Ooststr.; Xenostegia tridentata (L.) D.F. Austin & Staples

= Xenostegia tridentata =

Species of plant

Xenostegia tridentata, commonly known as the Narrowleaf morning glory, is a perennial creeper belonging to the family Convolvulaceae. It is widely distributed across tropical and subtropical regions of Africa, Asia, and Australia, and has also naturalized in parts of the Americas. The plant is characterized by its narrow, arrow-shaped leaves with toothed bases and small funnel-shaped yellow to white flowers. It typically grows in sandy soils, coastal areas, wastelands, and cultivated fields, flowering throughout the year.
