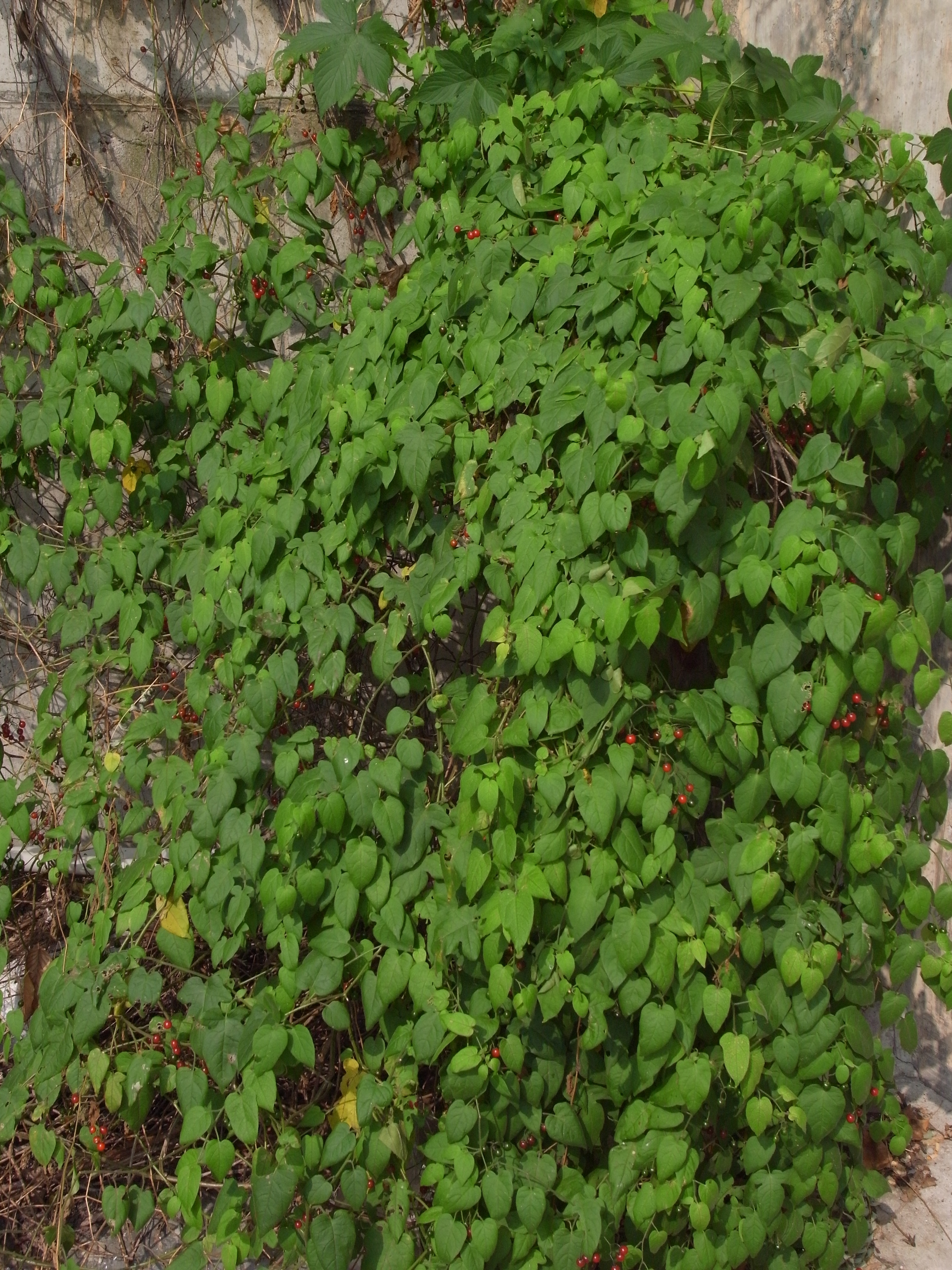
- Vining habit
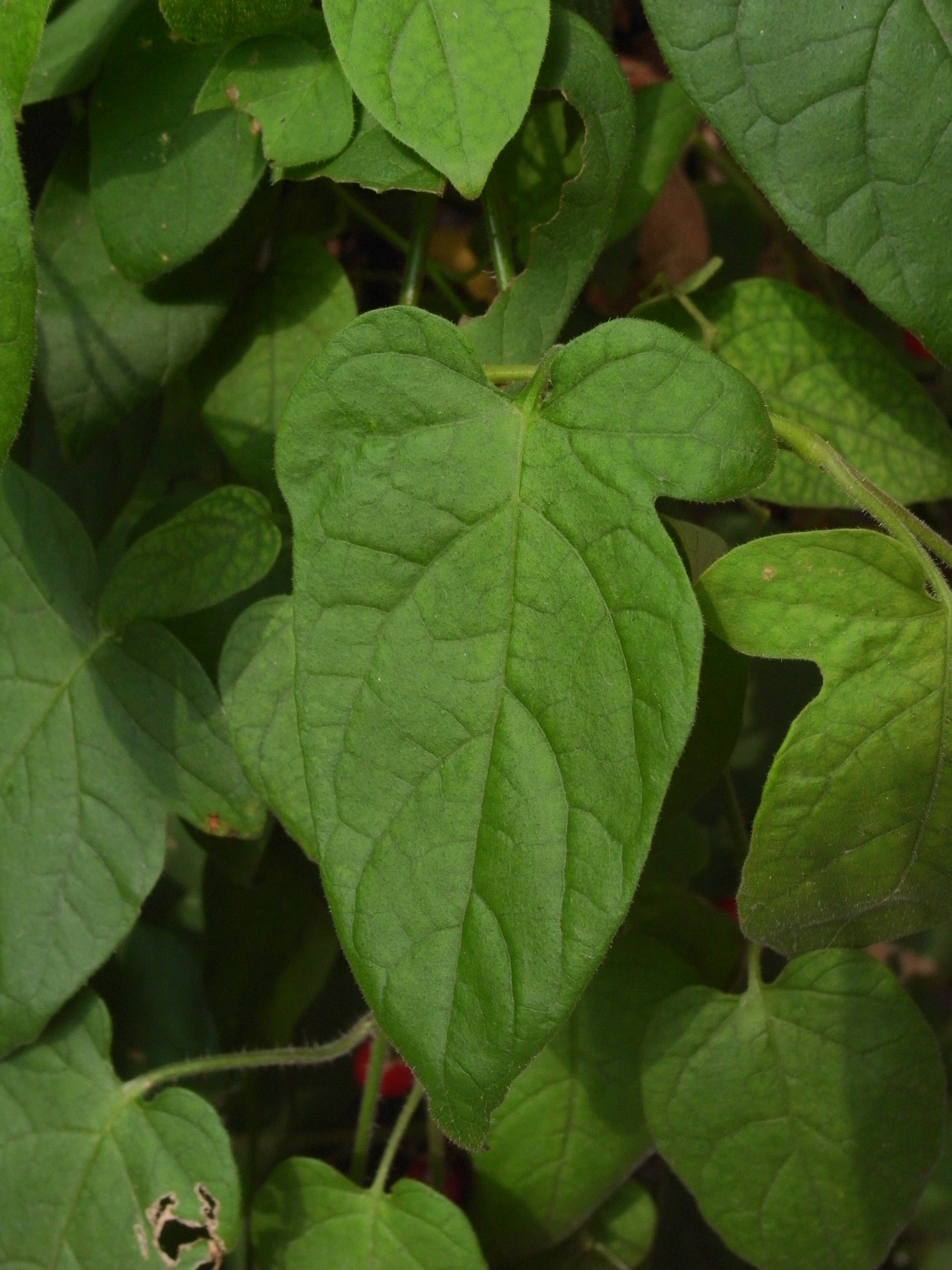
- Close-up of leaves

Scientific classification
- Kingdom: Plantae
- Clade: Tracheophytes
- Clade: Angiosperms
- Clade: Eudicots
- Clade: Asterids
- Order: Solanales
- Family: Solanaceae
- Genus: Solanum
- Species: S. lyratum

Binomial name
- Solanum lyratum Thunb.

Synonyms
- Solanum cathayanum C.Y.Wu & S.C.Huang; Solanum dichotomum Lour.; Solanum kayamae T.Yamaz.; Solanum lyratum var. filamentaceum Hayashi; Solanum lyratum f. purpuratum Konta & Katsuy.

= Solanum lyratum =

Species of plant in the nightshade family

Solanum lyratum, the lyreleaf nightshade, is a species of flowering plant in the family Solanaceae, native to China, Taiwan, Vietnam, Cambodia, the Korean Peninsula, and Japan. Usually found in forests, it is also somewhat weedy and can be found on disturbed ground.

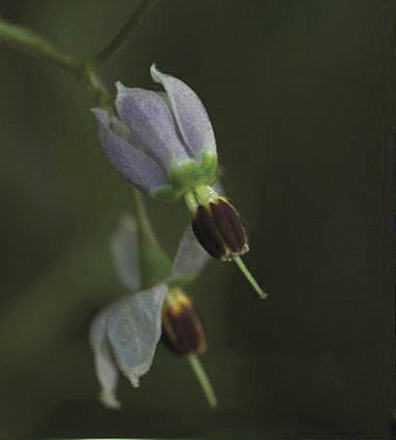
Flowers

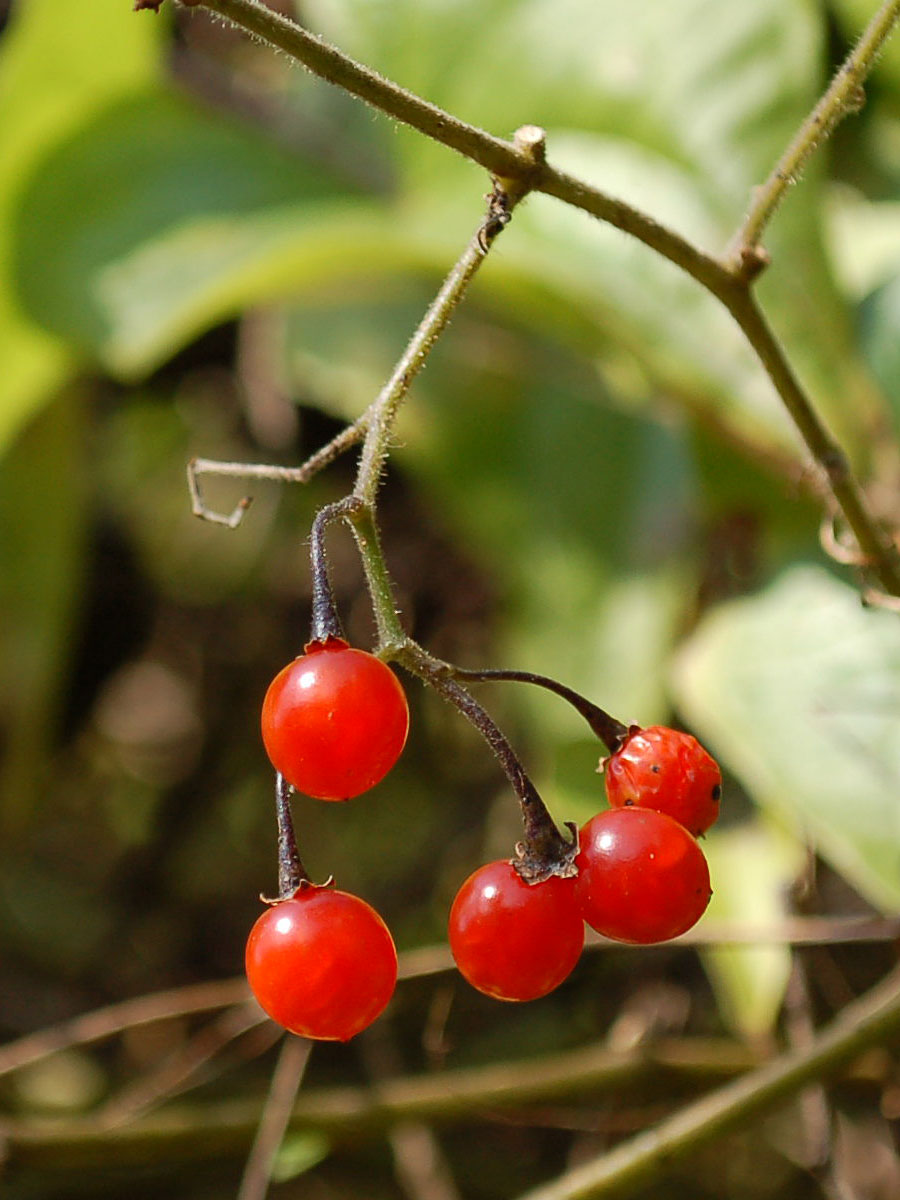
Fruit

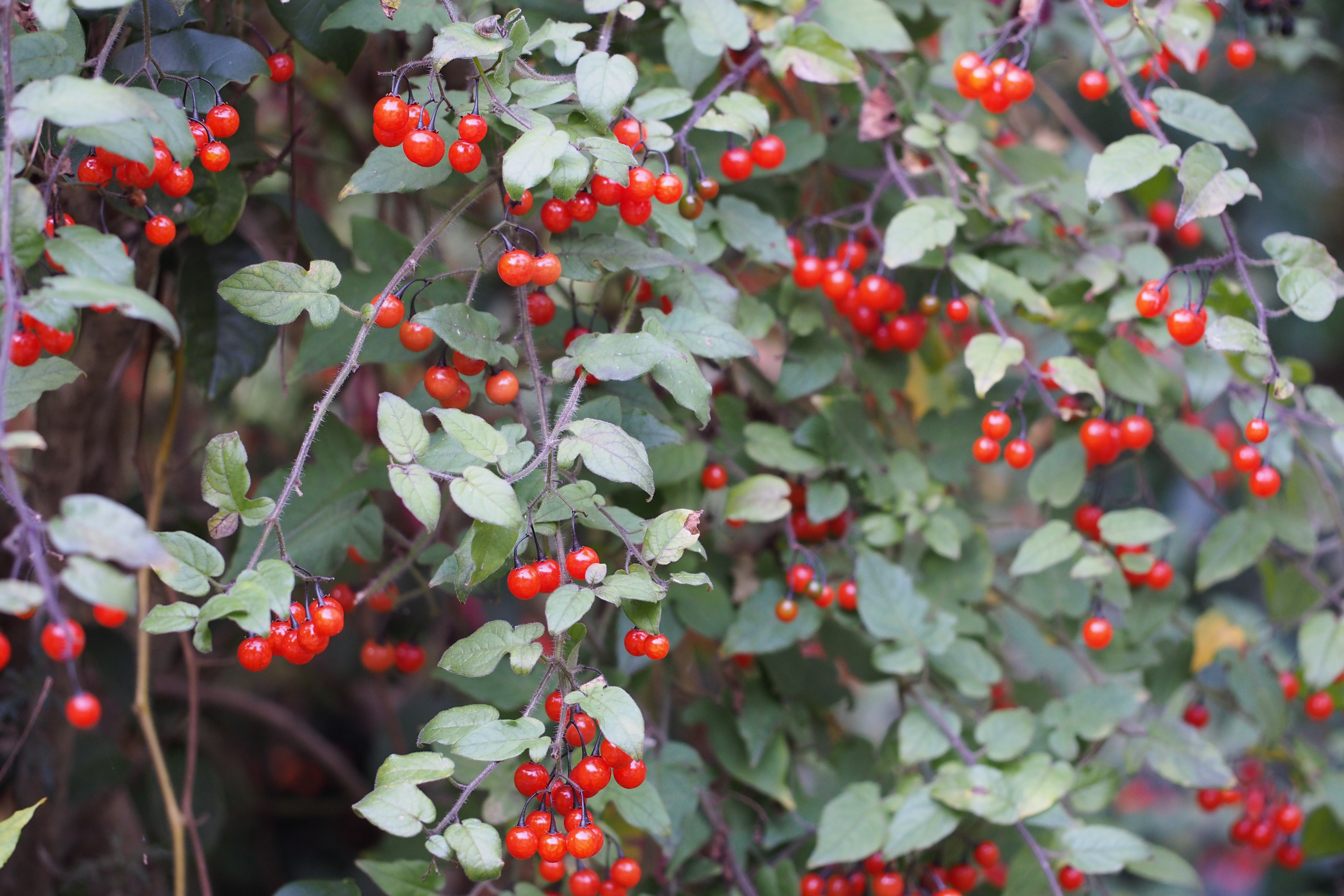
In Kobe, Japan

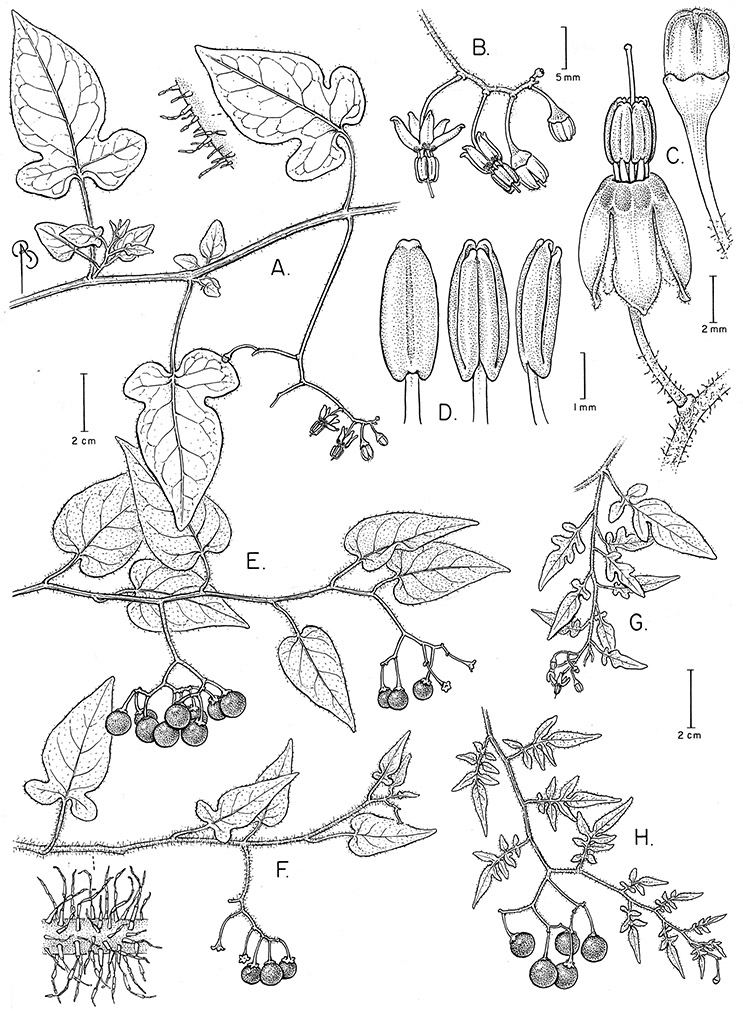
Botanical illustration
