= Solanum aturense =

Conservation status
- Least Concern (IUCN 3.1)

Scientific classification
- Kingdom: Plantae
- Clade: Tracheophytes
- Clade: Angiosperms
- Clade: Eudicots
- Clade: Asterids
- Order: Solanales
- Family: Solanaceae
- Genus: Solanum
- Species: S. aturense

Binomial name
- Solanum aturense Humb. & Bonpl. ex Dunal.

Solanum plants species

Solanum aturense is a species of Solanum plant with distribution in Central and Southern America. It bears red-orange berries.
