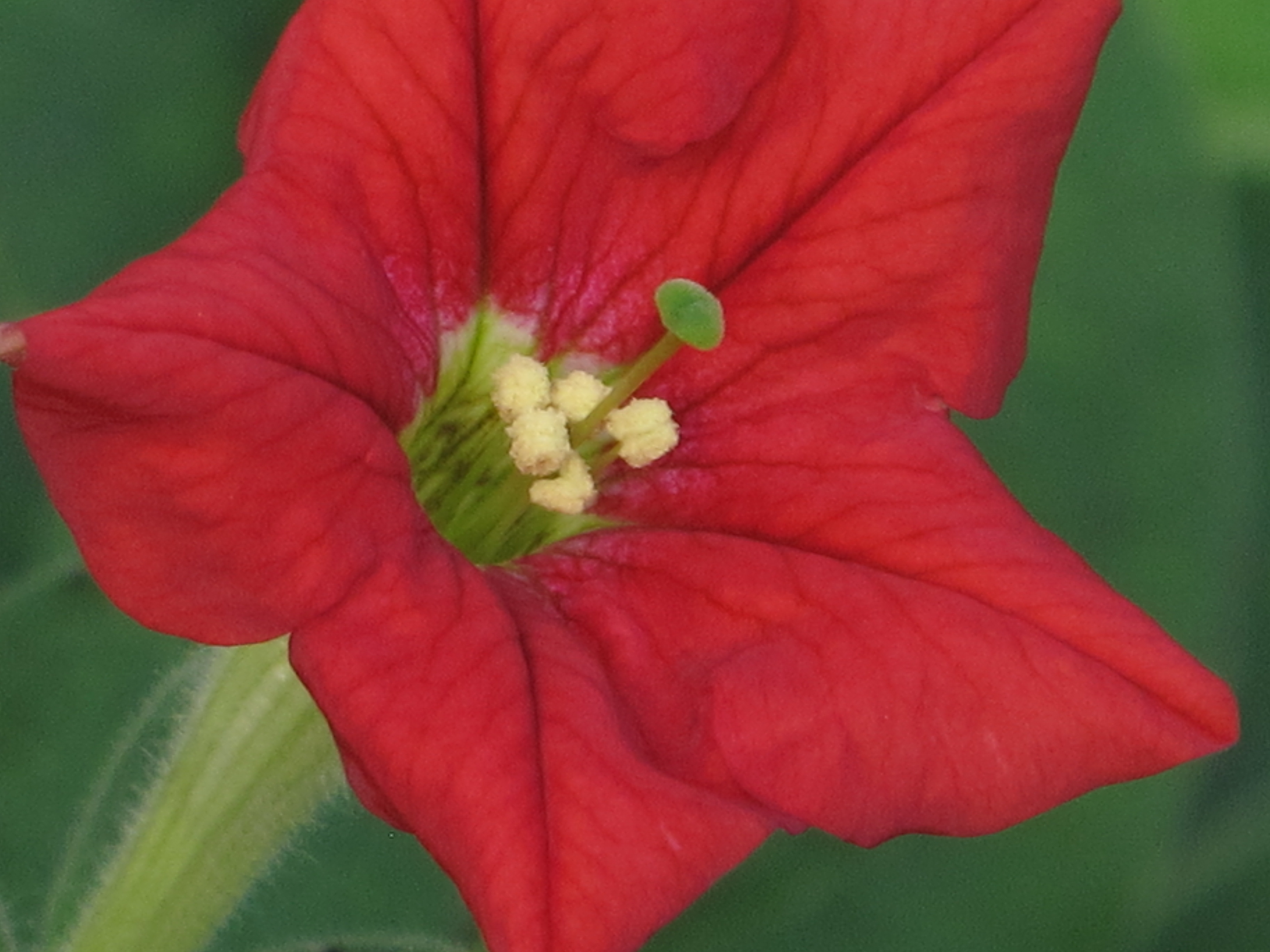
- Petunia exserta

Scientific classification
- Kingdom: Plantae
- Clade: Tracheophytes
- Clade: Angiosperms
- Clade: Eudicots
- Clade: Asterids
- Order: Solanales
- Family: Solanaceae
- Subfamily: Petunioideae; Thorne & Reveal

Type genus
- Petunia Juss.

= Petunioideae =

Subfamily of flowering plants

Petunioideae is a subfamily within the family Solanaceae.

== Taxonomy ==
=== Publication ===
It was published by Robert Folger Thorne and James Lauritz Reveal on the 29th of June 2007.

=== Genera ===
It contains thirteen genera, as follows:

- Benthamiella Speg. 12 species native to Patagonia: caespitose ("cushion-forming") dwarf shrubs. The species B. pycnophylloides Speg. bears the Spanish common name leña de piedra ("the kindling that grows on rock") in its native Argentina.
- Bouchetia Dunal 3 neotropical species.
- Brunfelsia L. Approximately 45 neotropical species. Shrubs with lavender or white flowers with slender tubes and narrow mouths in the centre of broad salver-form corolla lobes. Several species with medicinal and hallucinogenic properties.
- Combera Sandw. 2 species native to Patagonia: C. paradoxa Sandw. from Argentina (provinces of Neuquén and Rio Negro and adjoining parts of Chile) and C. minima Sandw., a very rare species endemic to the Chilean province of Valdivia. Dwarf herbaceous perennials – alpine xerophytes. C. paradoxa is an attractive plant meriting cultivation as an ornamental, bearing rosettes of dark green leaves contrasting with pale, fragrant flowers borne in profusion. Corollas white, tinged violet, contrasting with showy, bright yellow stamens and narrow-lobed, hairy, purple calyces.
- Fabiana Ruiz & Pav. known as pichi or false heath, 15 species from the Andes.
- Hunzikeria D'Arcy 3 species from the southwestern United States and Mexico.
- Leptoglossis Benth. 7 species from western South America.
- Nierembergia Ruiz & Pav. cup flowers, 21 species from South America.
- Pantacantha Speg. monotypic genus from western Argentina and Patagonia, the single species being Pantacantha ameghinoi Speg., a low (usually less than 1 m), spiny-leaved shrub bearing small, pale yellow, urceolate ("urn-shaped") flowers attractively striated with purple, native to the south of Mendoza Province in western Argentina and also to the Argentinian provinces of Neuquén, Río Negro and Chubut. The small, bell-like flowers and linear leaves give the shrub an Erica-like appearance. Common names in its native Argentina: quila or quilla (Spanish quilla translates as "keel" but the plant name may be a Mapuche language homonym with an entirely different meaning).
- Calibrachoa Cerv. ex La Llave & Lex 32 neotropical species segregated from Petunia.
- Petunia (Juss.) Wijsman 18 species from South America.
- Plowmania Hunz. & Subils monotypic genus with only 1 species, Plowmania nyctaginoides (Standl.) Hunz. & Subils., (common name Chiapas red trumpet) endemic to the Montane rainforests of southern Mexico and Guatemala. A small, scandent shrub with large and attractive flame-coloured flowers (somewhat reminiscent of those of the better-known ornamental Ipomoea coccinea), cultivated as an ornamental in the United States. First classified as a Brunfelsia (synonym B. nyctaginoides Standl). The genus Plowmania is named in honour of ethnobotanist and expert on the genus Brunfelsia, Timothy Plowman (1944–1989).

The Patagonian genera Benthamiella, Combera and Pantacantha merit referral from subfamily Petunioideae to subfamily Goetzeoideae of the Solanaceae.

== Use ==
=== Ornamental use ===
The genera Brunfelsia, Plowmania, Fabiana, Nierembergia and Petunia bear flowers for ornamental use. Brunfelsia and Plowmania are genera of tropical shrubs requiring glasshouse protection in temperate climate areas; Fabiana species are hardy shrubs; Nierembergia species are dwarf, hardy herbaceous perennials or sub-shrubs, and Petunia × atkinsiana has yielded a variety of flower colours, forms and patterns that have made it a popular summer bedding plant among horticulturists. Petunia is a well known genus of the subfamily in popular temperate zone horticulture.

=== Medicinal use ===
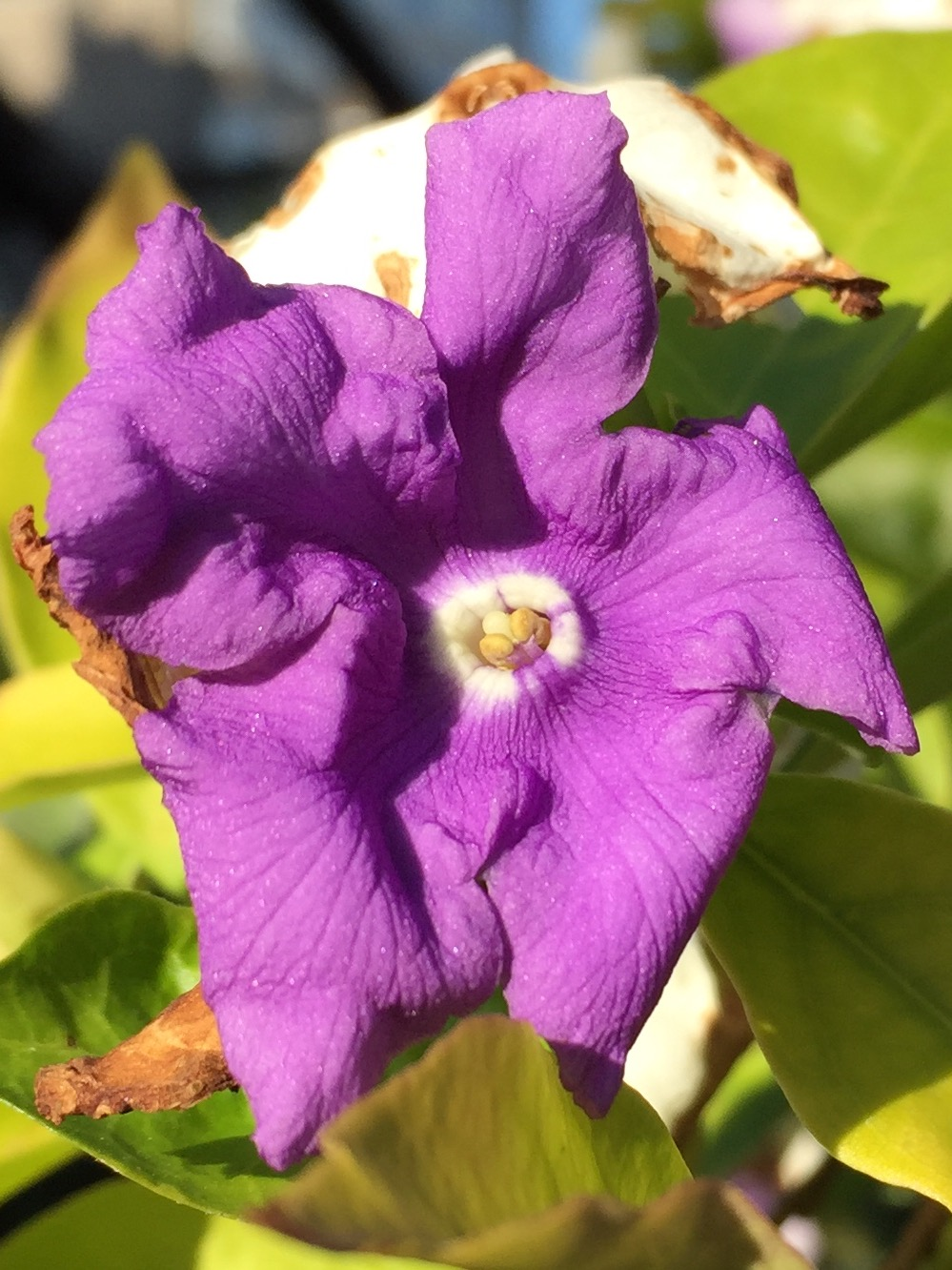
Brunfelsia pauciflora - Brazilian species, grown as pot-plant in glasshouse, Chelsea Physic Garden

Fabiana imbricata (Chilean vernacular name pichi) is used as a diuretic and digestive in the folk medicine of Chile. Studies have revealed it to contain sesquiterpenes possessing gastroprotective properties.

A number of Brunfelsia species have played important roles in the folk medicine of peoples indigenous to South America, having been used to treat conditions as diverse as syphilis, rheumatism, yellow fever and snakebite. The roots are the most effective parts of the plants and possess diuretic and sweat-inducing properties. Medications prepared from Brunfelsia species have the curious effect of producing the sensation of chills, this being the rationale for their folk use in the treatment of fevers.

=== Hallucinogenic use ===
Species belonging to the genera Brunfelsia, and Petunia have been employed as entheogens in South America, while the species Nierembergia hippomanica has been reported to have toxic and hallucinogen-like effects upon horses and to have similarities in its chemistry to that of the genus Brunfelsia. The chemistry of Nierembergia hippomanica is most unusual for that of a plant belonging to the Solanaceae, in that the species contains (among other classes of toxic compounds) phenethylamine proto-alkaloids more usually associated with cacti and grasses: β-Phenylethylamine, N-Methyltyramine, tyramine, and hordenine have been isolated from it.

The unusual epithet hippomanica is a compound of the Greek elements ἵππος ("hippos") horse and μανία ("mania") insanity / frenzy – hence "sending horses insane". Botanist John Miers references in the species name a plant hippomanes of uncertain identity mentioned in the idyll of Theocritus and the works of Theophrastus – so called either because horses were madly fond of it, or because it sent them mad if they fed upon it. The Greek name hippomanes was also referenced in the creation of the genus name Hippomane for an extremely toxic genus in the Euphorbiaceae.

Petunia violacea Lindl. has been reported to be used as a hallucinogen in Ecuador, where it has the vernacular name shanín. The drug is said to cause sensations of levitation and flight – a type of hallucination often associated with the use of the more toxic hallucinogenic plants of the deliriant type, e.g. the tropane-containing Atropa and Hyoscyamus – active constituents of the witches' flying ointments.

== Gallery ==
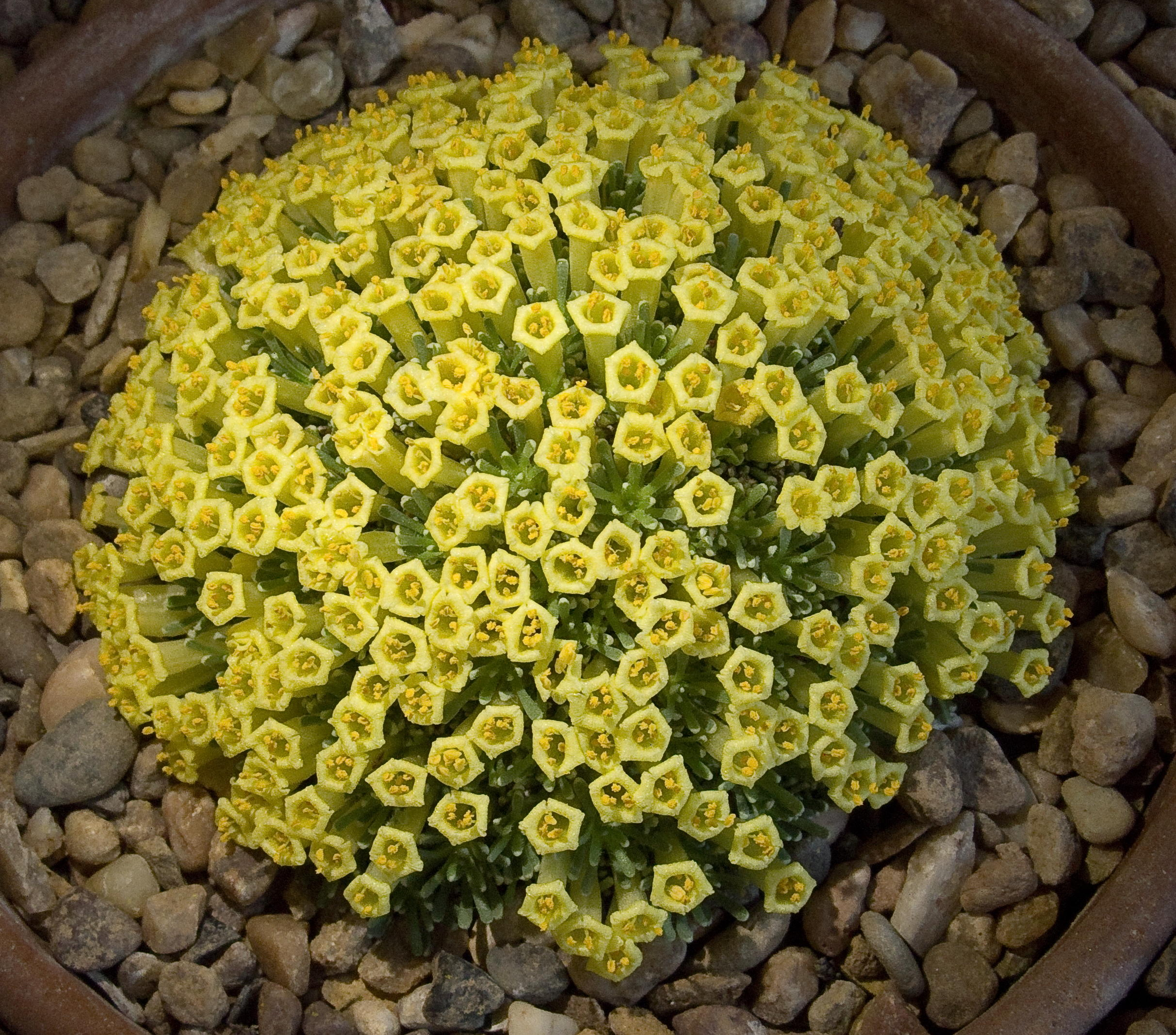
Benthamiella patagonica, a highly ornamental, caespitose hardy alpine from Patagonia.

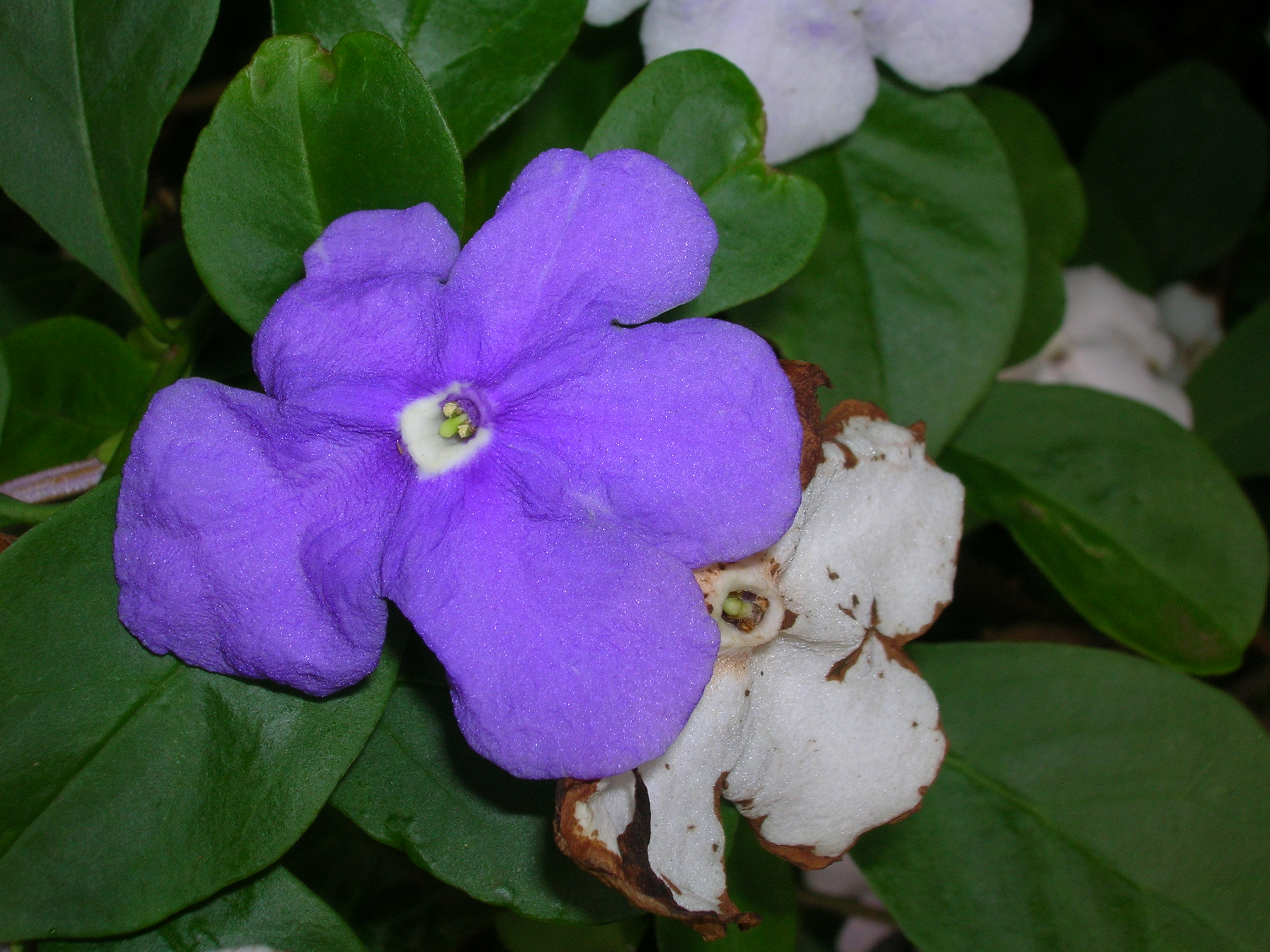
Brunfelsia australis: part of the ornamental value of Brunfelsia lies in the colour changes occurring in the flowers as they age.

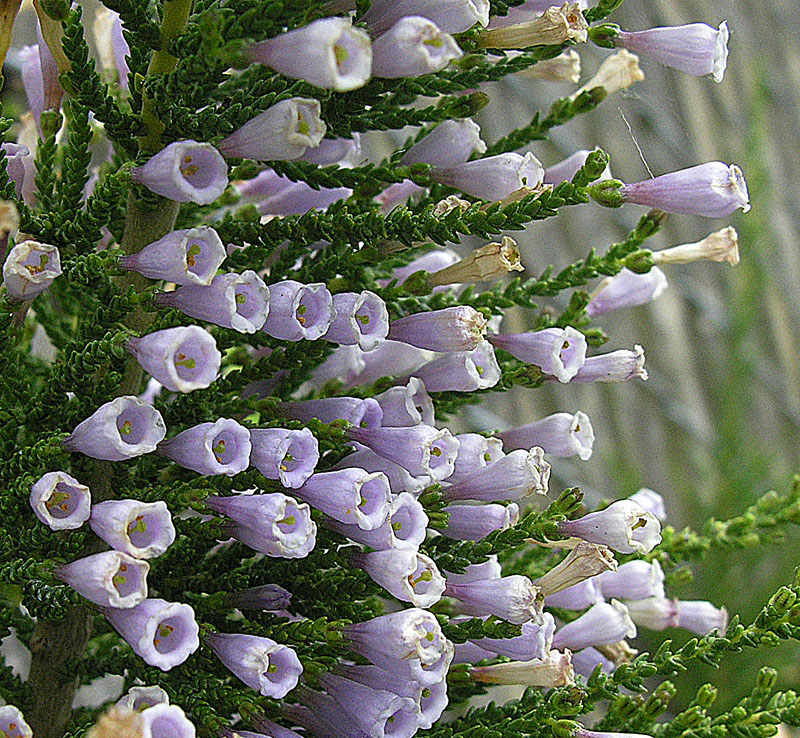
Fabiana imbricata f. violacea: the curious genus Fabiana includes species bearing a remarkable likeness to plants of the unrelated genus Erica.

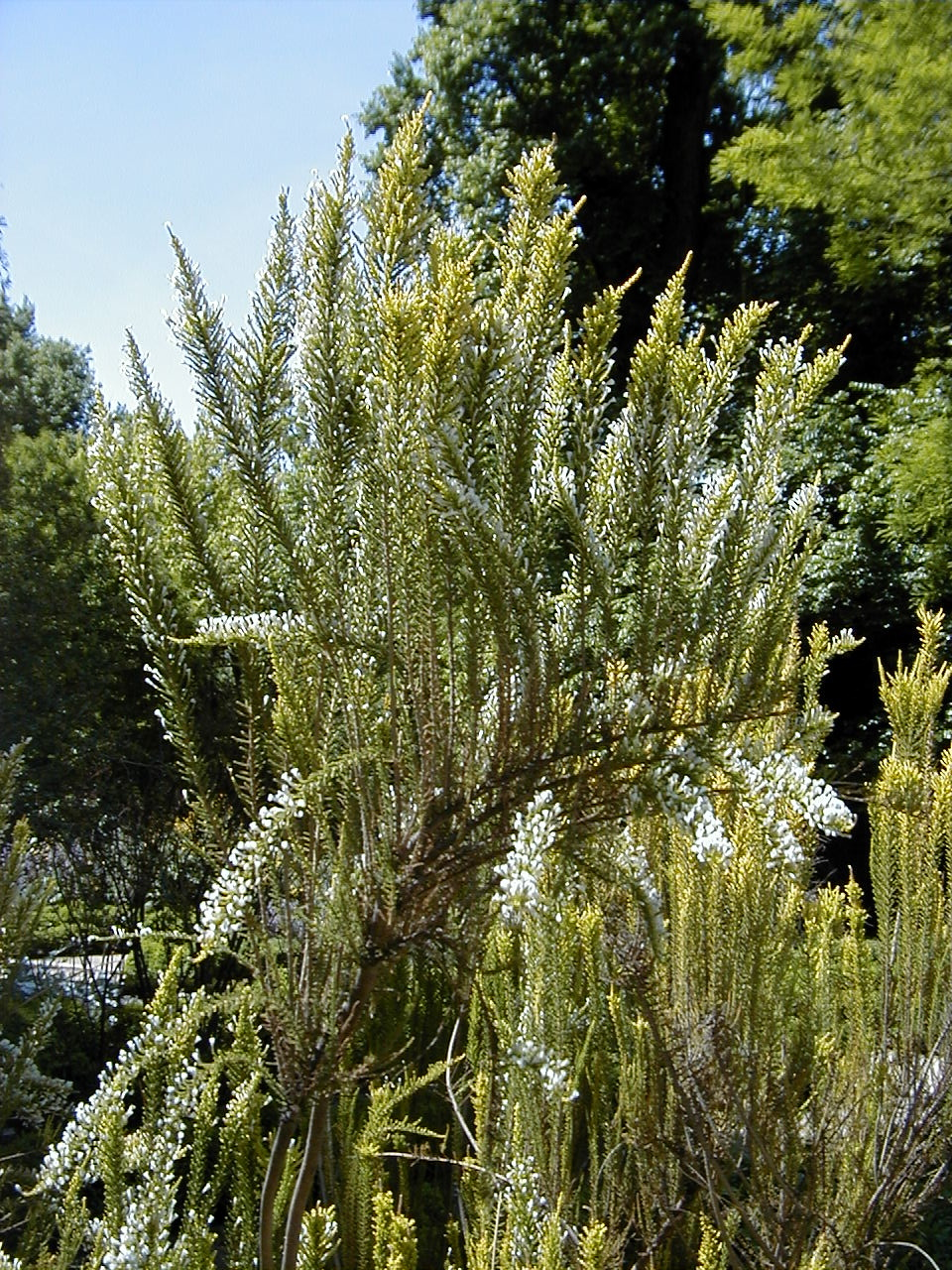
Growth habit of Fabiana imbricata, showing similarity to that of the Erica arborea.

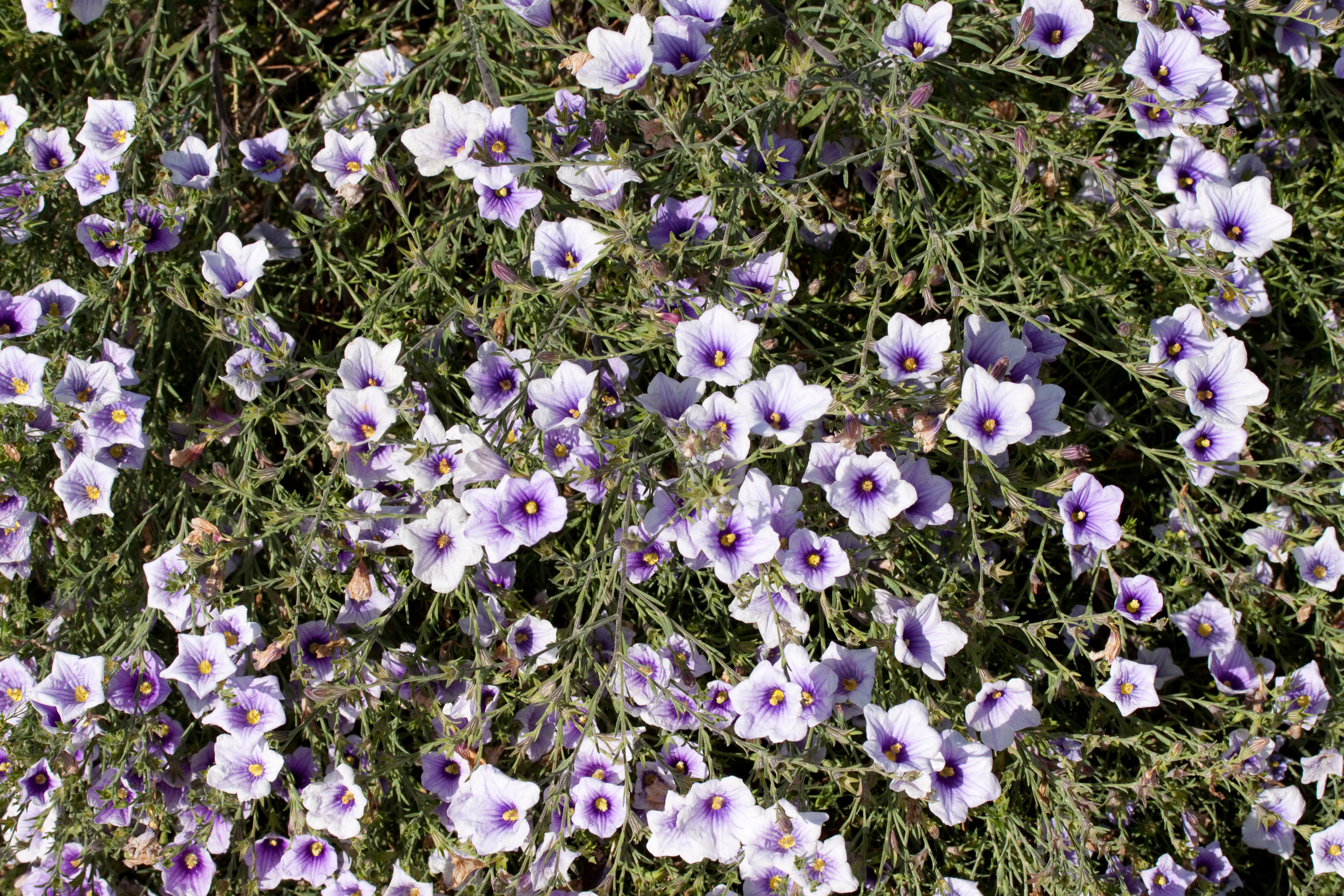
Nierembergia scoparia the broom-leaved cup flower, an attractive ornamental.

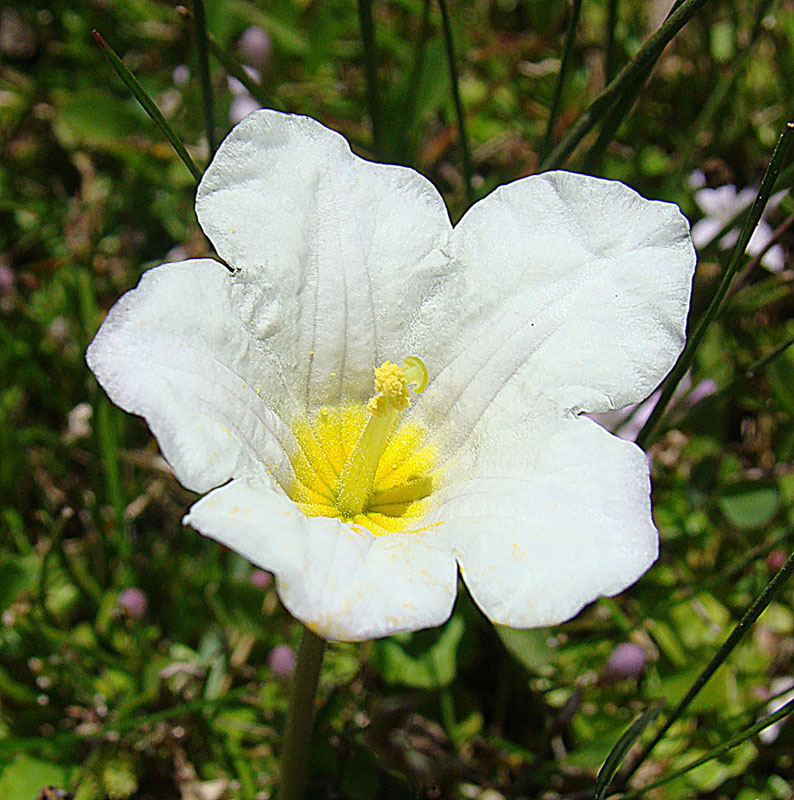
Nierembergia repens the creeping cup flower, a dwarf hardy perennial with large flowers – relative to its size.

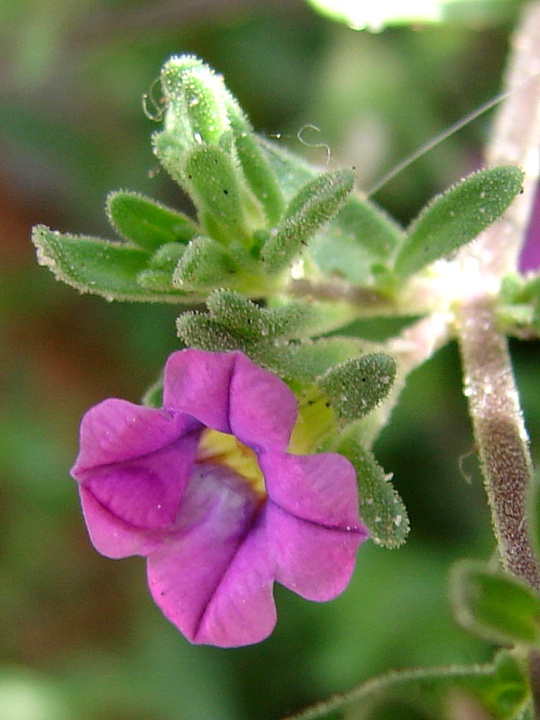
Calibrachoa parviflora: tiny flower and much-reduced hairy leaves seen in extreme close-up.

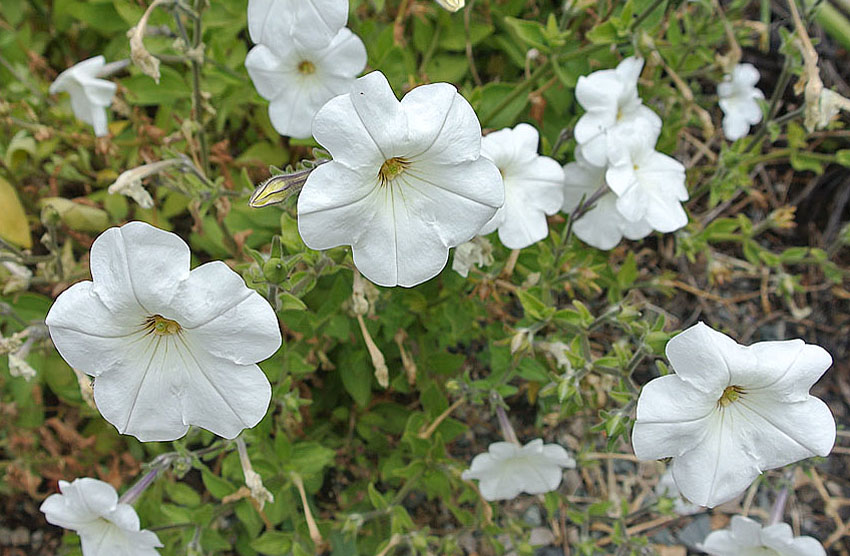
Petunia axillaris: one of the two parent species of the popular summer bedding plant Petunia × atkinsiana.
