= Bouchetia =

Bouchetia is the scientific name of two genera of organisms and may refer to:

- Bouchetia (gastropod), a genus of molluscs in the family Muricidae
- Bouchetia (plant), a genus of plants in the family Solanaceae
