= Yesterday, Today & Tomorrow =

Yesterday, Today & Tomorrow may refer to:

- Yesterday, Today & Tomorrow (Billy Butler album), 1970
- Yesterday, Today & Tomorrow (Gene Harris album), 1973
- Yesterday, Today & Tomorrow (K-the-I??? album), 2008
- Yesterday, Today, & Tomorrow (Spinners album), 1977
- Yesterday, Today, and Tomorrow (Bill Anderson album), 1984
- Yesterday, Today and Tomorrow, a 1963 Italian film
- Yesterday, Today, Tomorrow (1970 film), a Hong Kong drama film
- Yesterday, Today, Tomorrow (2011 film), a Filipino film
- Yesterday, Today, Tomorrow (album), a 1997 album by Kenny Loggins
- Brunfelsia pauciflora, a purple flower with the common name 'yesterday-today-and-tomorrow'
- "Yesterday, Today And Tomorrow", a song by Small Faces from their 1967 album From the Beginning
- Yesterday, Today and Tomorrow (American TV program), a 1989 NBC News primetime newsmagazine attempt
- Kal Aaj Aur Kal (lit. 'Yesterday Today Tomorrow'), a 1971 Indian film by Raj Kapoor
