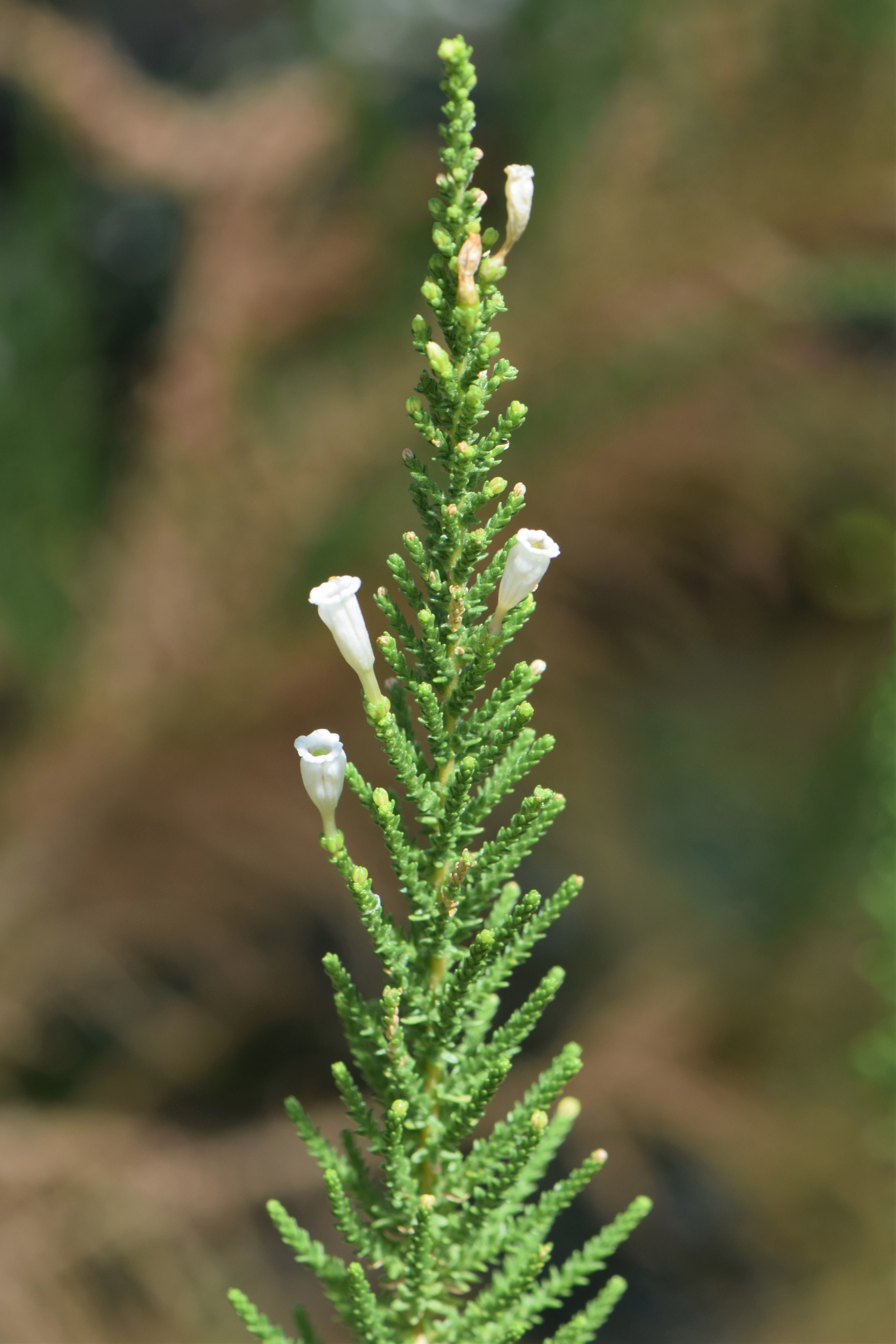

Scientific classification
- Kingdom: Plantae
- Clade: Tracheophytes
- Clade: Angiosperms
- Clade: Eudicots
- Clade: Asterids
- Order: Solanales
- Family: Solanaceae
- Genus: Fabiana
- Species: F. imbricata

Binomial name
- Fabiana imbricata Ruiz & Pav.

Synonyms
- Fabiana araucana Phil.; Fabiana biflora J.Rémy; Fabiana imbricata var. biflora (J.Rémy) Reiche; Fabiana lutescens Phil.

= Fabiana imbricata =

Species of flowering plant

Fabiana imbricata, vernacular names pichi, palo piche, or false heath, is a species of flowering plant in the family Solanaceae. It is native to dry upland slopes in the foothills of the southern Andes of Chile and Argentina. Growing to 2.5 m (8 ft 2 in) tall and wide, it is a frost-hardy, heath-like evergreen mound-forming shrub. It has needle-like leaves and small white, tubular flowers in early summer.

The upright form F. imbricata f. violacea, of horticultural origin, bears masses of pale violet flowers. It has gained the Royal Horticultural Society's Award of Garden Merit.

== Description ==
F. imbricata is a long-lived shrub distributed via seeds, and broadly distributed within South America. It requires fire and wind, followed by post-fire high precipitation in the early spring. It is a keystone species within its ecosystems, reducing species richness while simultaneously increasing fuel load during grassland colonization events, altering the structure of the surrounding ecosystem.

== Uses ==
F. imbricata foliage has traditionally been employed as a diuretic and digestive, and has been proven to have a dose-dependent gastroprotective effect, in studies evaluating the main sesquiterpene of the foliage. Interest in F. imbricata has extended into the development of in vitro culturing of the plant’s tissue for the harvesting of secondary metabolites for further research.

== Taxonomy ==
Fabiana imbricata is the type species for the genus Fabiana.

An analysis of the nightshade family Solanaceae (including 89 genera and 190 species) pinpointed the relationships of the genus Fabiana to other genera within the family. This analysis established through the study of chloroplast DNA that Fabiana is a sister clade with the genus Calibrachoa and that these two genera are sisters to Petunia. This group together belong to tribe Petunieae, within subfamily Petunioideae of the family Solanaceae.

This analysis examined one species in each of these three genera. These data are in agreement with a karyotypic analysis that examined 41 populations of 5 genera (21 species) within the Nicotianeae tribe of Solanaceae (later reorganized by into several new groups, including the supergeneric group Petunieae, by Olmstead and Migid el al. 2008). This study found the haploid and monoploid numbers of chromosomes to be 9 for F. imbricata, F. densa, and F. denudata, Calibrachoa sp., and the Petunia species examined. They suggest that the ancestral Solanales had a monoploid number of 7 chromosomes, with the monoploid number of 12 deriving from a genome duplication event followed by tetraploid reduction. Within the groups surveyed, this methodology does not give rise to the same phylogenetic tree overall as that of Olmstead and Migid, but for Fabiana and sister genera, it is in agreement. Current data do not permit the detailed phylogenetic analysis of Fabiana below the genus level.

== Gallery ==
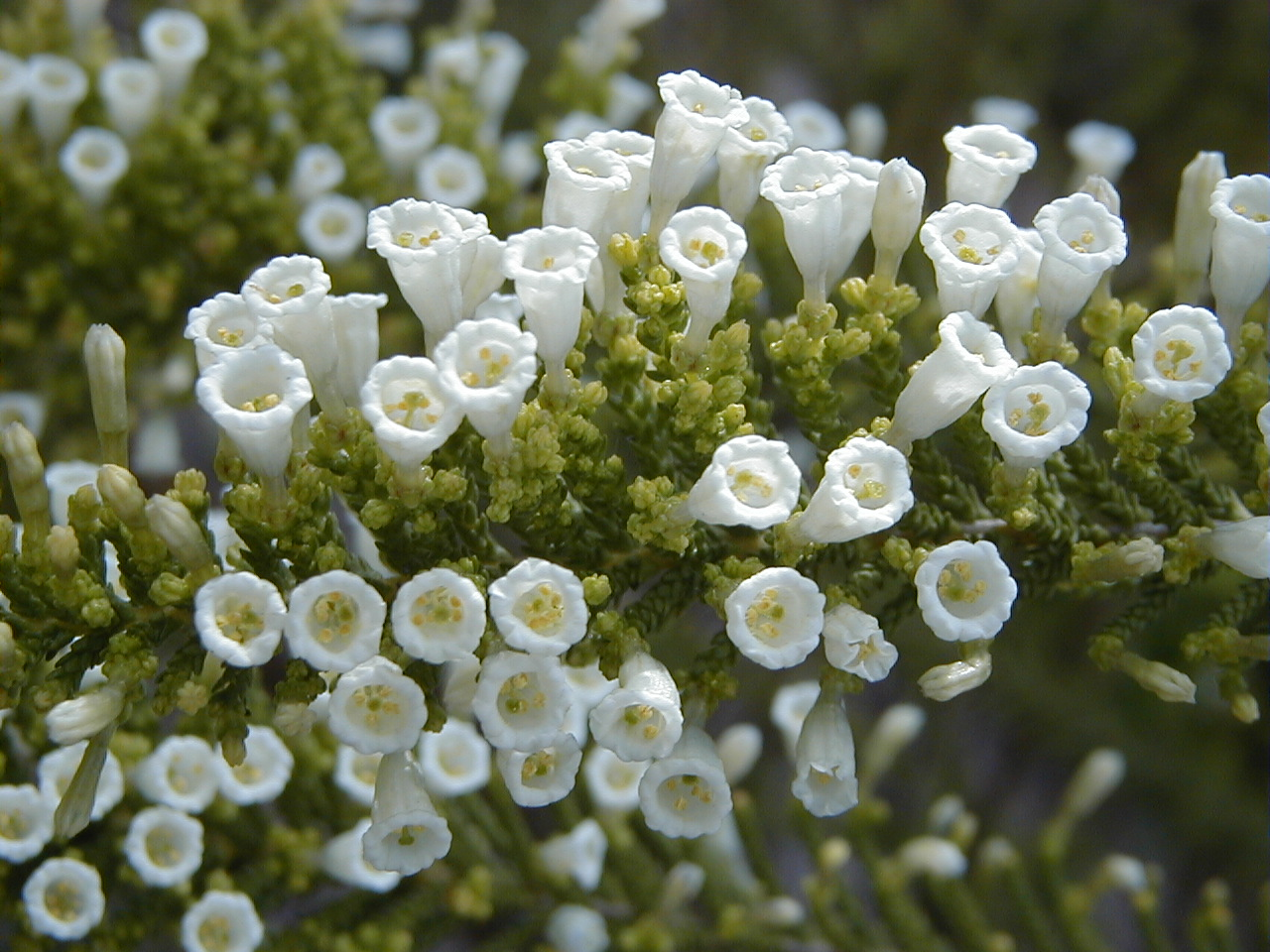
Closeup of flowers
