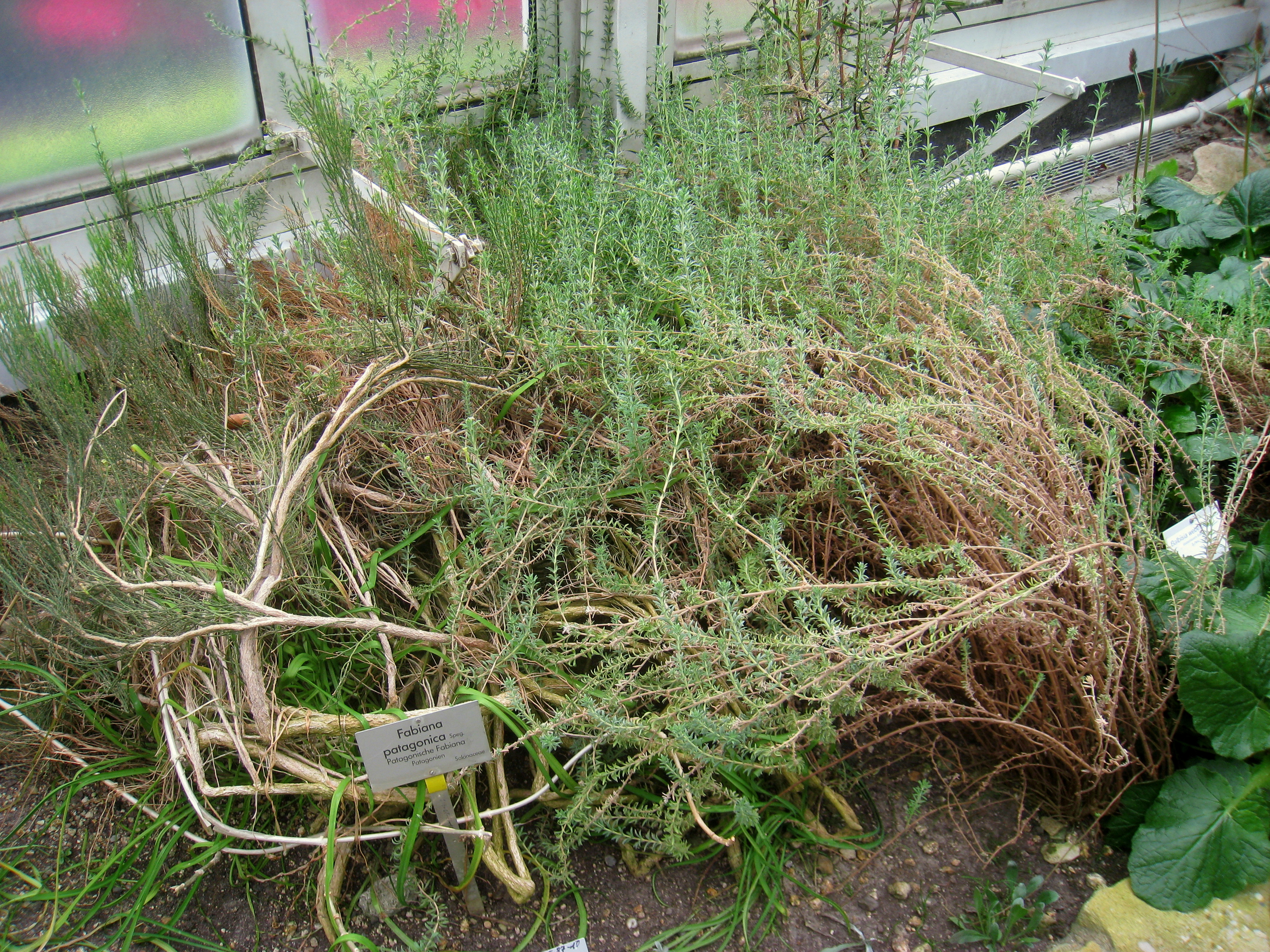
- Fabiana patagonica

Scientific classification
- Kingdom: Plantae
- Clade: Tracheophytes
- Clade: Angiosperms
- Clade: Eudicots
- Clade: Asterids
- Order: Solanales
- Family: Solanaceae
- Subfamily: Petunioideae
- Genus: Fabiana; Ruiz & Pav.

Species
- See text

= Fabiana (plant) =

Genus of flowering plants

Fabiana is a genus of flowering plants in the nightshade family, native to dry slopes in western South America. They are evergreen shrubs or subshrubs, with needle-like leaves and profuse tiny tubular flowers in summer. The common name is false heath because the leaves superficially resemble those of the distantly related heaths. The species F. imbricata is cultivated as a common horticultural plant and a common herbarium specimen.

== Distribution and habitat ==
Members of the genus grow within 16◦ and 51◦ latitude in the arid mountainous regions of South America between 1000–4900 m above sea level.

== Pharmacology ==
The genus Fabiana has been studied by ethnopharmacologists due to the use of extracts from species within the genus in traditional South American medicine. The plants are employed as an antiseptic, anti-inflammatory (through infusions and decoctions), as well as to set broken bones, using the resin exuded by the foliage and branches. European researchers have periodically studied the medicinal value of the plant since as early as 1877. A range of current studies have validated the diuretic and anti-inflammatory, and anti-oxidant for Fabiana species including F. imbricata F. patagonica, F. punnensis, F. densa, and particularly, F. bryoides, which also inhibited spontaneous mutanogenisis in the bacterium Salmonella typhimumrium by up to 50% with no impact on cell viability. The foliage of F. imbricata, specifically has been traditionally employed as a diueretic and digestive and has been proven to have a dose-dependent gastroprotective effect, in studies evaluating the main sesquiterpene of the foliage. Interest in F. imbricata has extended into the development of invitro culturing of the plant’s tissue for the harvesting of secondary metabolites for further research.

== List of species ==
The proposed number of species included in the genus Fabiana ranges significantly from 15 to 36. As of 2013 the USDA lists only the single type species within the genus in 2013. The USDA’s listing indicates lack of commercial interest in the genus, rather than any scientific consensus of species number.

While the family Solanaceae has been well studied and documented overall, this research attention has not been applied uniformly amongst the genera. Genera such as Fabiana, with limited commercial or cultural agricultural value have been overlooked in detailed phylogenetic analysis.

- Fabiana araucana
- Fabiana barriosi
- Fabiana barrisii
- Fabiana biflora
- Fabiana bryoides
- Fabiana clarenii
- Fabiana cordifolia
- Fabiana densa
- Fabiana denudata
- Fabiana deserticola
- Fabiana ericoides
- Fabiana fiebrigii
- Fabiana foliosa
- Fabiana friesii
- Fabiana grandiflora
- Fabiana heterophylla
- Fabiana hieronymi
- Fabiana imbricata
- Fabiana indica
- Fabiana lanuginosa
- Fabiana lutescens
- Fabiana nana
- Fabiana patagonica
- Fabiana peckii
- Fabiana petunioides
- Fabiana punensis
- Fabiana ramulosa
- Fabiana sellowiana
- Fabiana squamata
- Fabiana squamuligera
- Fabiana stephanii
- Fabiana thymifolia
- Fabiana violacea
- Fabiana viscosa
