= Calibrachoa elegans =

Scientific classification
- Kingdom: Plantae
- Clade: Tracheophytes
- Clade: Angiosperms
- Clade: Eudicots
- Clade: Asterids
- Order: Solanales
- Family: Solanaceae
- Genus: Calibrachoa
- Species: C. elegans

Binomial name
- Calibrachoa elegans (Miers) Stehmann & Semir, 1997

Synonyms
- Homotypic Synonyms: Petunia elegans Miers; Heterotypic Synonyms: Petunia ledifolia Sendtn.

Species of flowering plant

Calibrachoa elegans is a species of flowering plants in the family Solanaceae. It is endemic to Minas Gerais in Brazil.
