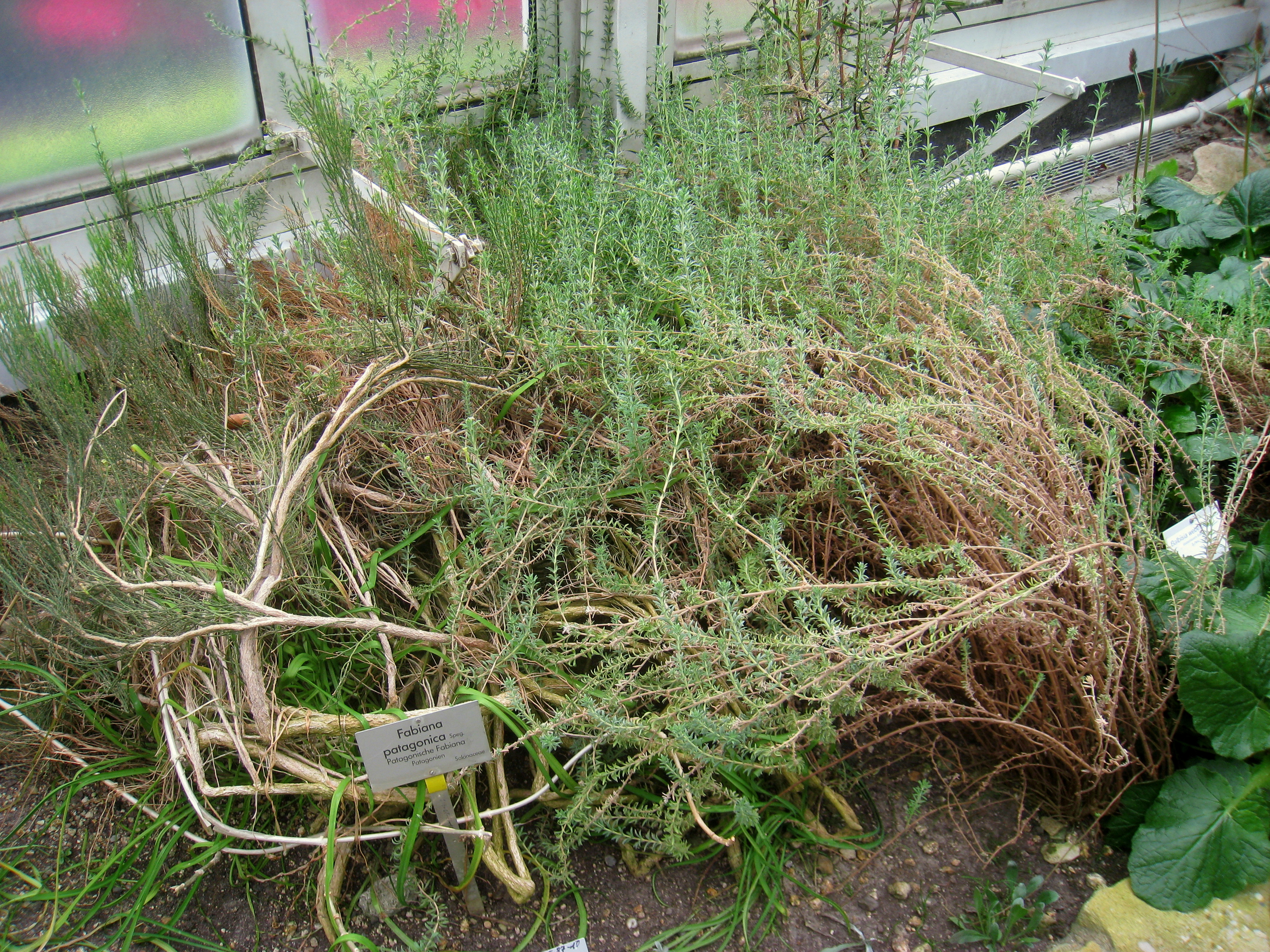

Scientific classification
- Kingdom: Plantae
- Clade: Tracheophytes
- Clade: Angiosperms
- Clade: Eudicots
- Clade: Asterids
- Order: Solanales
- Family: Solanaceae
- Genus: Fabiana
- Species: F. patagonica

Binomial name
- Fabiana patagonica Speg.

= Fabiana patagonica =

Species of flowering plant

Fabiana patagonica is a species of plant in the nightshade family, native to Patagonia. This plant species is native to South America.

== Synonyms ==
- Fabiana glandulosa
- Fabiana kurtziana
- Fabiana peckii var. patagonica

== Varieties ==
- Fabiana patagonica var. brachyloba
- Fabiana patagonica var. foliosa
- Fabiana patagonica var. gracilis
- Fabiana patagonica var. nana
- Fabiana patagonica var. typica
