= Armando Theodoro Hunziker =

Argentine botanist (1919–2001)

- Born: 29 August 1919; Chacabuco, Buenos Aires, Argentina
- Died: 12 December 2001 (aged 82); Córdoba, Argentina
- Scientific career
- Fields: Botany
- Author abbrev. (botany): Hunz.

Armando Theodoro Hunziker (29 August 1919 – 12 December 2001) was an Argentine botanist. He specialized in the study of systems biology of the family Solanaceae, and contributed with a large number of investigations and publications.

== Biography ==
Armando Theodoro Hunziker was born 29 August 1919 to a Swiss Argentine family in Chacabuco, Argentina. An aunt taught him the languages German, French, Italian and English. He studied agronomy at the University of Buenos Aires, where he met his mentor, Lorenzo Raimundo Parodi, who supervised his graduate thesis about the genus Cuscuta, a parasite that affects wild and cultivated plants in Argentina and Uruguay. At the age of 22, he received the Premio José Manuel de Altoaguirre (José Manuel Altolaguirre Award) and one year later he received the Premio Eduardo Holmberg (Eduardo Holmberg Award).

In 1945, at the age of 25, Hunziker was nominated curator of the Botanical Museum of the National University of Córdoba, recommended by the Nobel Prize winner in Medicine Bernardo Alberto Houssay. Between 1949 and 1982, he was a professor in this university, having achieved the title of honored professor. In 1957, he received a prize from the National Commission for Culture for regional scientific production; in 1968, he received the Weissmann Prize, and in 1983 the Konex de Platino (Platinum Konex) prize.

He participated in the creation of the National Scientific and Technical Research Council where he worked as science and technology researcher from 1963, as a member of the administration council in 1994, and as a senior researcher from 1998. In 1961, he founded the Kurtziana journal, of which he remained the editor until 1998.

He worked abroad for several years. Between 1947 and 1954 at Harvard University, he performed research with Irving Widmer Bailey. In 1954, he worked under sponsorship of the British Council in the Royal Botanic Gardens, Kew, England. From 1961 to 1962 and again from 1979 to 1980, he performed research in the United States, under sponsorship of the Guggenheim Foundation.

In 1999, he was diagnosed with cancer and suspended all his other projects in order to dedicate himself to his main work, the book Genera Solanacearum: The Genera of Solanaceae Illustrated, Arranged According to a New System, which was published shortly before his death which occurred on 12 December 2001 in Córdoba, Argentina.

The standard author abbreviation Hunz. is used to indicate this person as the author when citing a botanical name. During his life, he published more than 150 scientific papers and described multiple plant species, including Orchis × kelleri Hunz. ex G.Keller & Soó, now a taxonomic synonym of Orchis × fallax (De Not.) Willk., and Capsicum eximium Hunz. One plant genus, Hunzikeria (in the family Solanaceae), eleven species, and one subspecies have been named in his honour.

== Sources ==
- Anton, Ana M. 2002. "Armando T. Hunziker (1919 − 2001)"; Taxon 51: 393-403.
- Hunziker, Armando T. 2001. The Genera of Solanaceae. A.R.G. Gantner Verlag K.G., Ruggell, Liechtenstein. ISBN 3-904144-77-4.
