= Hunzikeria =

Scientific classification
- Kingdom: Plantae
- Clade: Tracheophytes
- Clade: Angiosperms
- Clade: Eudicots
- Clade: Asterids
- Order: Solanales
- Family: Solanaceae
- Genus: Hunzikeria; D'Arcy

Genus of flowering plants

Hunzikeria is a genus of flowering plants belonging to the family Solanaceae.

Its native ranges are Mexico and Venezuela.

The genus name of Hunzikeria is in honour of Armando Theodoro Hunziker (1919–2001), an Argentine botanist. He had specialized in the study of systems biology of the family Solanaceae. It was first described and published by William Gerald D'Arcy in Phytologia Vol.34 on page 283 in 1976.

Known species, according to Kew:

- Hunzikeria coulteri (A.Gray) D'Arcy
- Hunzikeria steyermarkiana D'Arcy
- Hunzikeria texana (Torr.) D'Arcy
