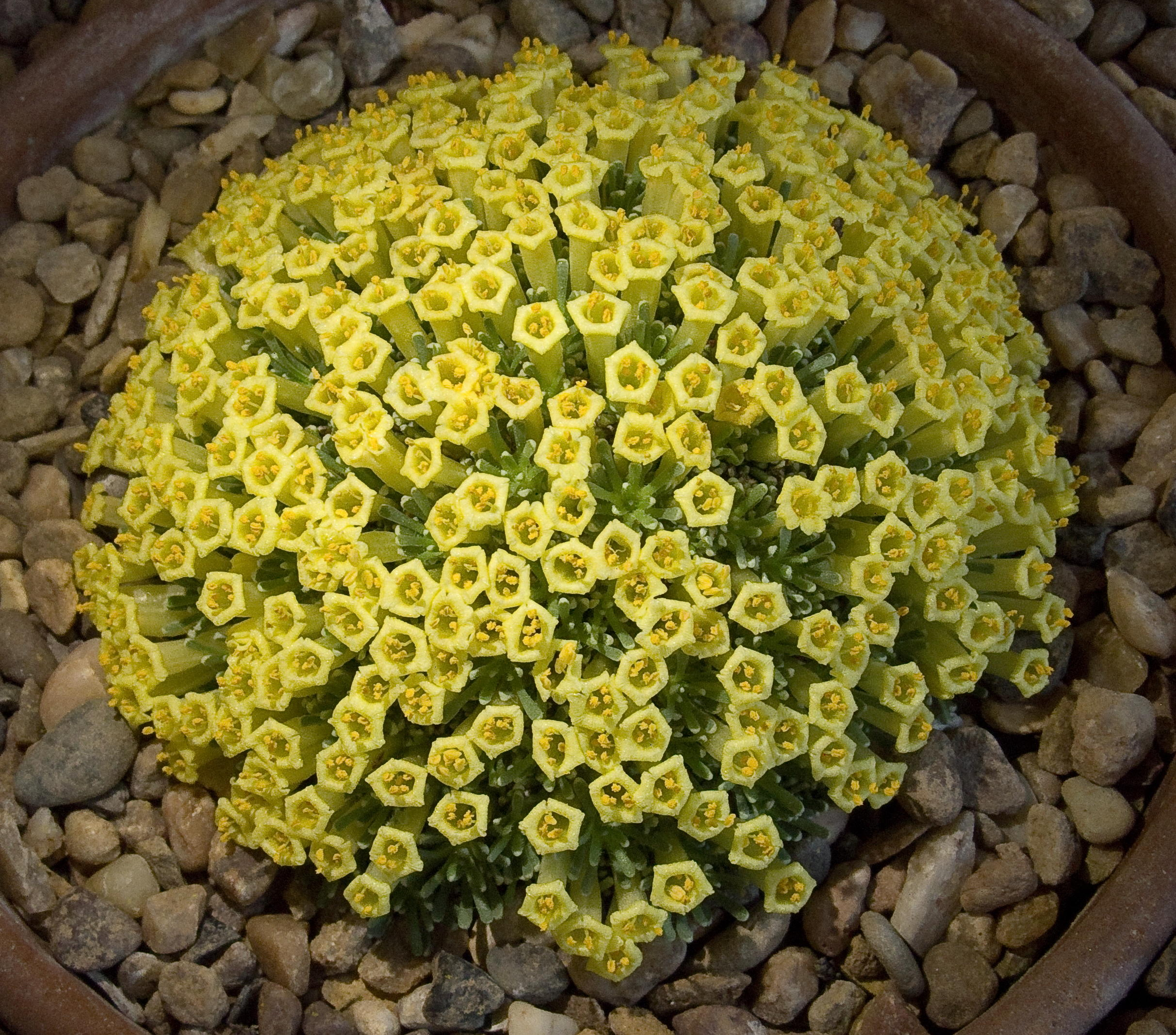
- Benthamiella patagonica in cultivation

Scientific classification
- Kingdom: Plantae
- Clade: Tracheophytes
- Clade: Angiosperms
- Clade: Eudicots
- Clade: Asterids
- Order: Solanales
- Family: Solanaceae
- Genus: Benthamiella; Speg.

= Benthamiella =

Genus of flowering plants

Benthamiella is a genus of plants in the family Solanaceae, native to Patagonia in southern South America. Its species have been described as "attractive, small, cushion plants".

== Description ==
All the species of Benthamiella are low-growing cushions or mats, with small overlapping leaves, and flowers with short or no stems, appearing within or just above the leaves. The flowers are typical of those of the Solanaceae (nightshade family), being tubular with five free lobes at the end. Most species have white or pale yellow flowers, although deeper yellows are found and Benthamiella nordenskioldii may have flowers tinged with violet.

== Taxonomy ==
The genus was first described in 1883 by Carlo Luigi Spegazzini. The name commemorates George Bentham, whose great work (with Joseph Dalton Hooker), Genera Plantarum, setting out the "Bentham & Hooker system", was completed in that year.

Two species, Benthamiella azorella and Benthamiella spegazziniana, were at one time placed in a separate genus Saccardophytum, on the basis of two rather than five exserted stamens (i.e. stamens appearing outside the flower tube). They are now considered to be part of Benthamiella.

=== Species ===
As of April 2015, The Plant List accepts the following species:

- Benthamiella azorella (Skottsb.) C.Soriano
- Benthamiella azorelloides Speg.
- Benthamiella chubutensis C.Soriano
- Benthamiella graminifolia Skottsb.
- Benthamiella lanata C.Soriano
- Benthamiella longifolia Speg.
- Benthamiella nordenskioldii Dusén ex N.E.Br. (also spelt B. nordenskjoldii)
- Benthamiella patagonica Speg.
- Benthamiella pycnophylloides Speg.
- Benthamiella skottsbergii C.Soriano
- Benthamiella sorianoi S.Arroyo
- Benthamiella spegazziniana C.Soriano

== Distribution and habitat ==
The genus is found only in Patagonia, split between Argentina and Chile, with the most species (nine) being found in the Argentine province of Santa Cruz.

Benthamiella species are found in treeless areas of open countryside, ranging from low-lying areas of central Patagonia to areas above 1,000 m (3,300 ft). Most receive 20–40 cm (8–16 in) of rain a year. Only B. nordenskioldii is found in the alpine zone.

== Cultivation ==
As of 2015, four species were in cultivation: B. azorella, B. longifolia, B. nordenskioldii and B. patagonica. The last of these grows and flowers well.
