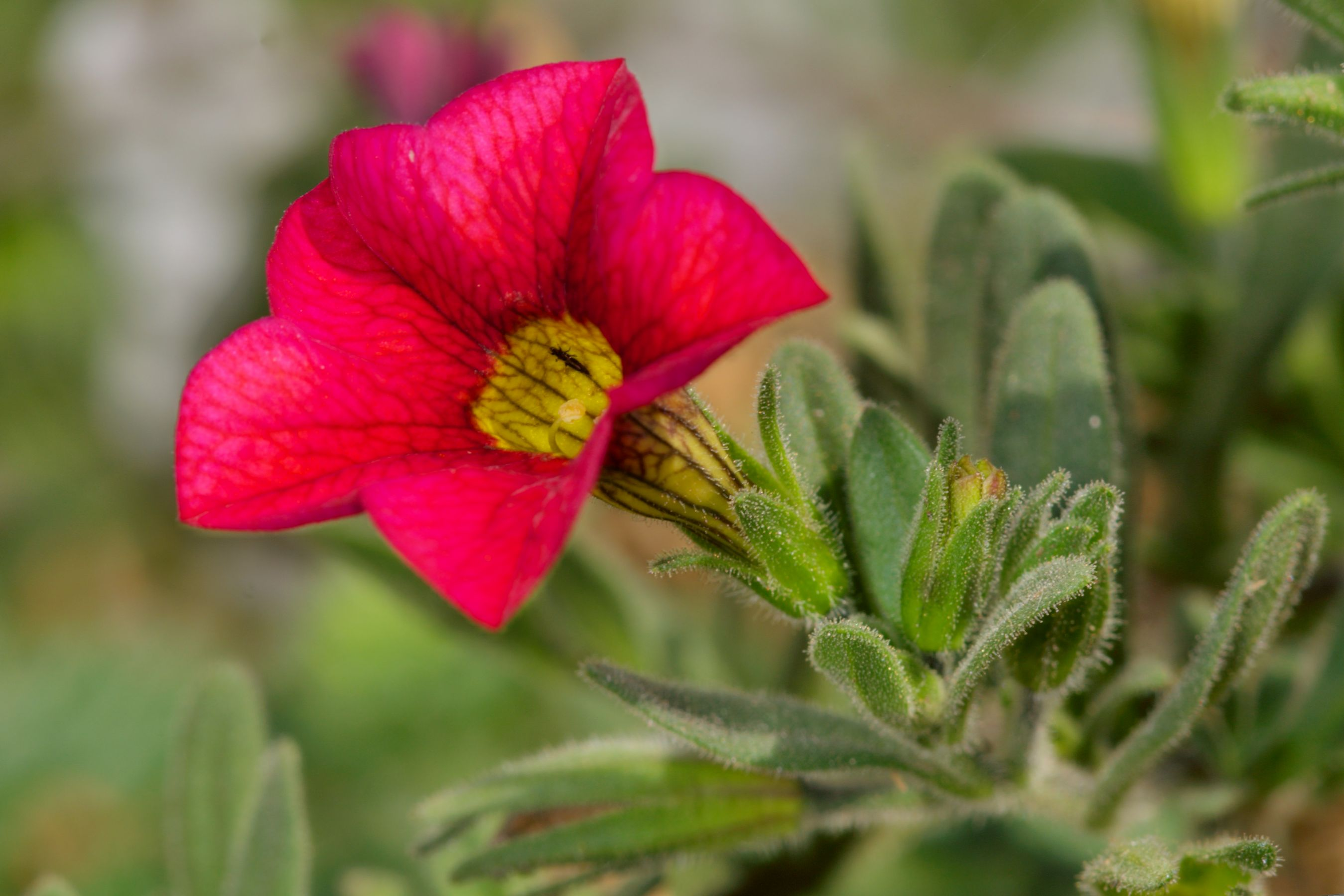

Scientific classification
- Kingdom: Plantae
- Clade: Embryophytes
- Clade: Tracheophytes
- Clade: Spermatophytes
- Clade: Angiosperms
- Clade: Eudicots
- Clade: Asterids
- Order: Solanales
- Family: Solanaceae
- Subfamily: Petunioideae
- Genus: Calibrachoa; Cerv.

Species
- See text

= Calibrachoa =

Genus of flowering plants

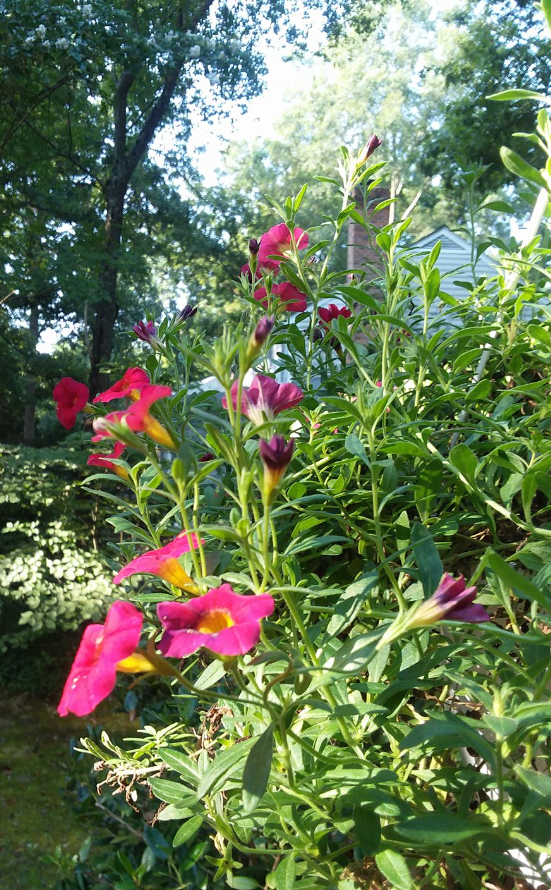
calibrachoa "million bells" in a hanging basket

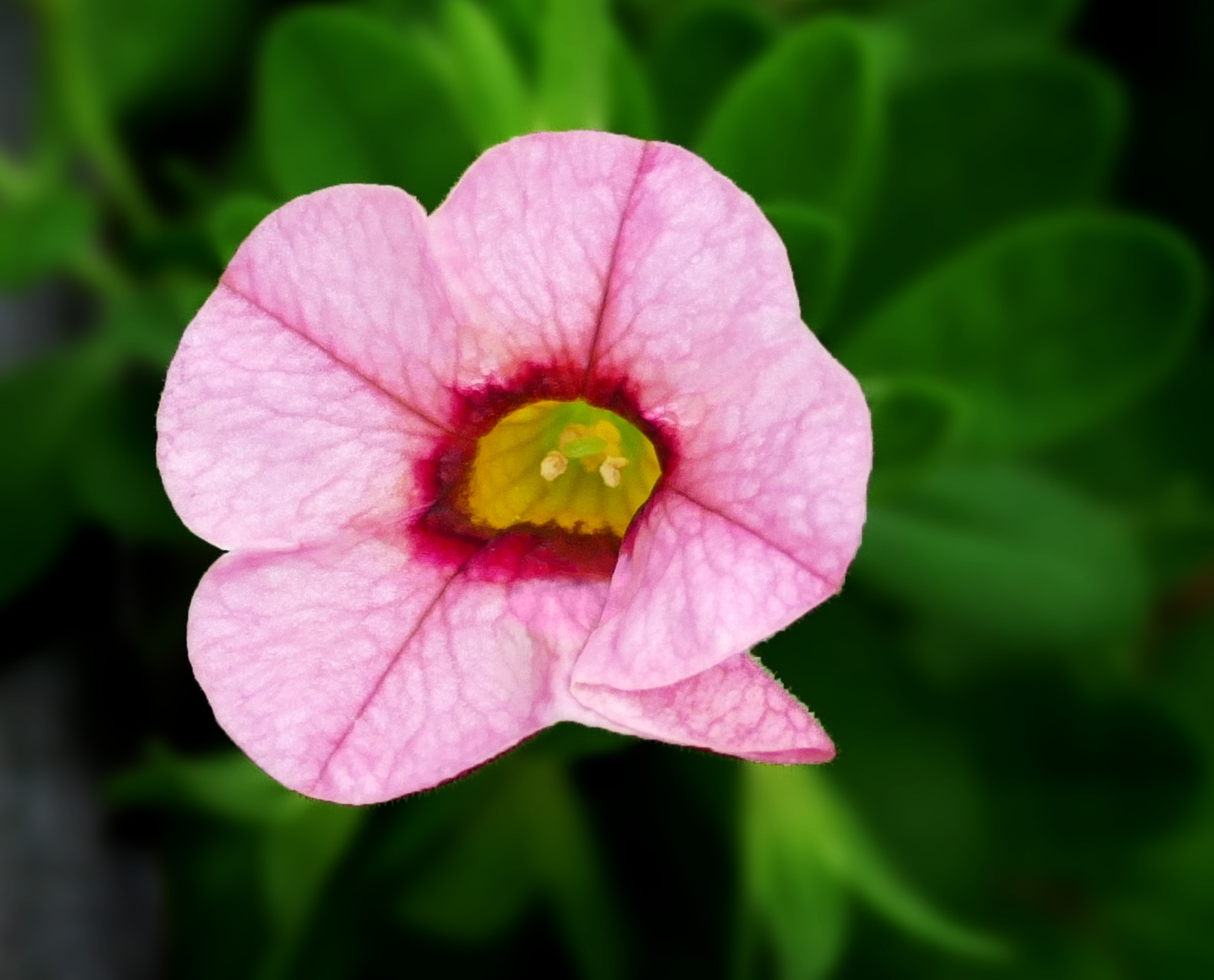
hybrid 'Superbells Strawberry Punch'

Calibrachoa is a genus of plants in the Solanaceae (nightshade) family. They are evergreen short-lived perennials and subshrubs with a sprawling habit, with small petunia-type flowers. They are found across much the same region of South America as petunias, from southern Brazil across to Peru and Chile, inhabiting scrub and open grassland.

== Description ==
Calibrachoa are small shrubs or herbaceous plants with woody shoot axis that grow annual or perennial. The leaves are ovate, elliptic, reverse ovate or linear; its edge is flat or rolled back. The inflorescences are monochasial and have oppositely standing, foliage-like bracts. The flowers are usually zygomorphic, the bud cover is reciprocal in most species, the only exception is Calibrachoa pygmaea in both cases. The calyx has five or ten ribs, it is usually lobed to about the middle, the lobes are usually narrowed towards the top. The crown is funnel-shaped, but in Calibrachoa pygmaea it is salver-shaped, bulbous and tapered towards the tip. The color of the crown can be purple, red, pink or whitish.

The fruits are capsules. The seeds have a net-like surface. This structure is due to walls perpendicular to the seed surface, which are straight in all species.

== Taxonomy ==
Calibrachoa are closely related to Petunia. However, on further examination it has been found that there are major differences in chromosomes, corresponding to external differences and fertilization factors that distinguished the two genera. Petchoa is a hybrid genus derived from crossing the genetically similar Calibrachoa and Petunia.

Calibrachoa was named by Vicente Cervantes after Antonio de la Cal y Bracho, a 19th-century Mexican botanist and pharmacologist.

=== Species ===
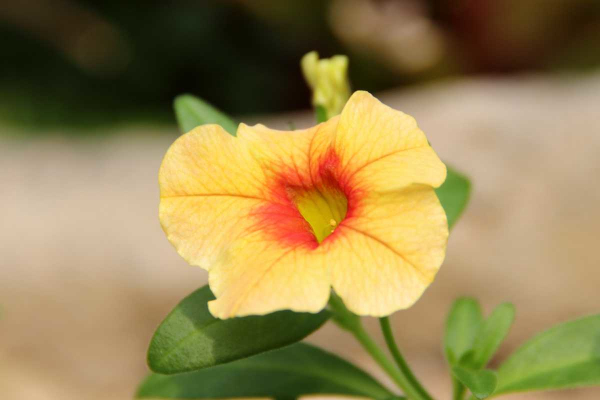
A Calibrachoa hybrid

28 species, including:

- Calibrachoa caesia
- Calibrachoa calycina
- Calibrachoa dusenii
- Calibrachoa eglandulata
- Calibrachoa elegans
- Calibrachoa ericaefolia
- Calibrachoa excellens
- Calibrachoa hassleriana
- Calibrachoa heterophylla
- Calibrachoa linearis
- Calibrachoa parviflora
- Calibrachoa pygmaea
- Calibrachoa rupestris
- Calibrachoa sellowiana
- Calibrachoa spathulata
- Calibrachoa thymifolia

== Cultivation ==
Some Calibrachoa are cultivated as ornamental plants, popularly known as "Million Bells". The plants can tolerate light frost and thrive in sun or semi-shade. Plant in a free-draining soil and water only when the soil is almost dry. They can be propagated from tip cuttings, but are frequently grown as half-hardy annuals. They are suitable for container gardening and hanging baskets and will attract hummingbirds.

=== Cultivars ===
The following cultivars are recipients of the Royal Horticultural Society's Award of Garden Merit:

- Cabaret Bright Red='Balcabrite'
- Calibasket Pink Doll='Wescapido'
- Million Bells Trailing Topaz='Sunbelrikubu'
- Minifamous Double Light Blue='Kleca16364'
- Minifamous Double PinkMania!='Kleca16356'
- Minifamous Double Pinktastic='Kleca18085'
- Rave Pink '16='Kleca16006'
