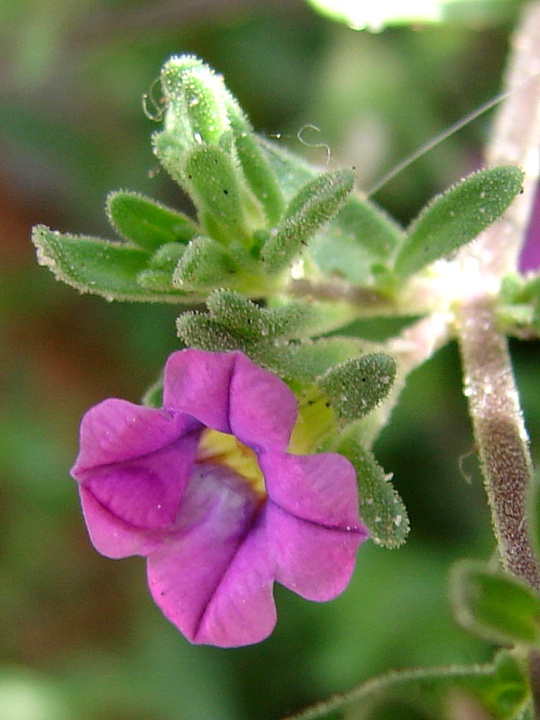

Scientific classification
- Kingdom: Plantae
- Clade: Tracheophytes
- Clade: Angiosperms
- Clade: Eudicots
- Clade: Asterids
- Order: Solanales
- Family: Solanaceae
- Genus: Calibrachoa
- Species: C. parviflora

Binomial name
- Calibrachoa parviflora (Juss.) D'Arcy

Synonyms
- Brachyanthes nierembergiensis Cham. ex Dunal; Calibrachoa mexicana Lex.; Calibrachoa procumbens Cerv.; Leptophragma montevidensis (Spreng.) Dunal; Leptophragma prostrata Benth. ex Dunal; Lindernia montevidensis Spreng.; Nicotiana parviflora (Juss.) Lehm.; Nierembergia viscidula Kunth; Petunia parviflora Juss.; Petunia viscidula Miers; Salpiglossis prostrata Hook. & Arn. ex Miers in Hook.

= Calibrachoa parviflora =

Species of flowering plant

Calibrachoa parviflora is a species of flowering plant in the nightshade family known by the common name seaside petunia. It is native to much of southeastern South America, Mexico, and the southwestern United States, and it is present as an introduced species in other sections of the Americas, such as the southeastern United States, as well as in Australia, where it is an occasional weed in New South Wales. This herb produces slender, branching stems which creep along the ground and root at nodes. The upright branches are leafy, with fleshy, glandular, oblong or widely lance-shaped leaves. The herbage may be sticky in texture. Flowers occur in the leaf axils along the stems. Each is under a centimeter wide, its funnel- or bell-shaped corolla five-lobed and purple in color, with a paler tubular throat. The fruit is a capsule just a few millimeters wide.
