= Pantacantha =

Scientific classification
- Kingdom: Plantae
- Clade: Tracheophytes
- Clade: Angiosperms
- Clade: Eudicots
- Clade: Asterids
- Order: Solanales
- Family: Solanaceae
- Genus: Pantacantha; Speg. (1902)
- Species: P. ameghinoi

Binomial name
- Pantacantha ameghinoi Speg. (1902)

Genus of plants

Pantacantha is a monotypic genus of flowering plants belonging to the family Solanaceae. The only species is Pantacantha ameghinoi.

It is a shrub native to southern Argentina.
