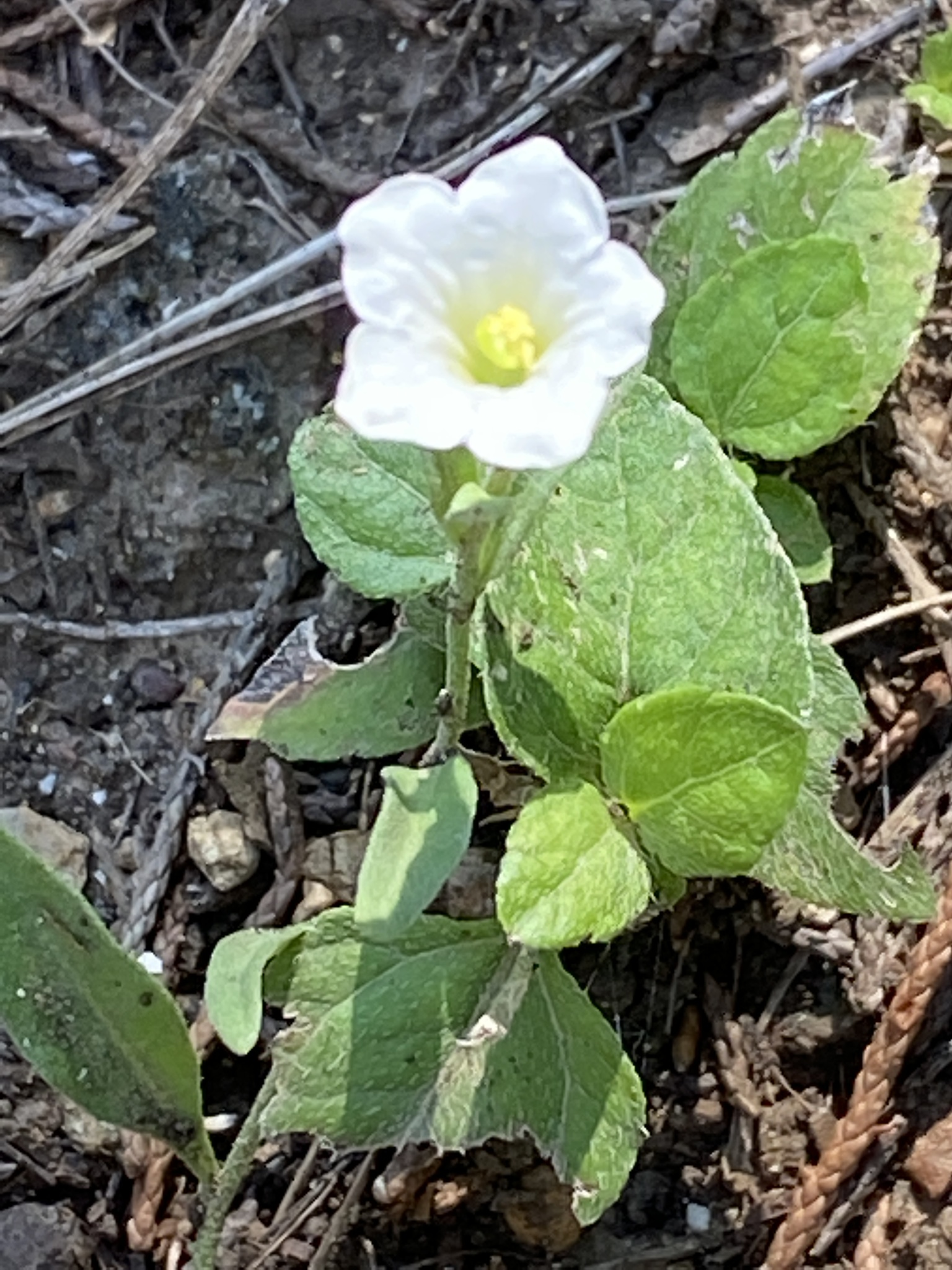
- Bouchetia erecta

Scientific classification
- Kingdom: Plantae
- Clade: Tracheophytes
- Clade: Angiosperms
- Clade: Eudicots
- Clade: Asterids
- Order: Solanales
- Family: Solanaceae
- Genus: Bouchetia; DC. ex Dunal

Synonyms
- Leucanthea Scheele

= Bouchetia (plant) =

Genus of flowering plants

Bouchetia is a genus of flowering plants belonging to the family Solanaceae. Its native range is subtropical America and it is found in the countries of Argentina, Brazil, Guatemala, Mexico, Paraguay, Uruguay and the United States (Texas).

The genus name of Bouchetia is in honour of Dominique Bouchet-Doumenq (1771–1844), French physician and botanist in Montpellier.

== Species ==
The following species are recognised in the genus Bouchetia:

- Bouchetia anomala (Miers) Britton & Rusby
- Bouchetia erecta DC. ex Dunal
- Bouchetia procumbens DC. ex Dunal
