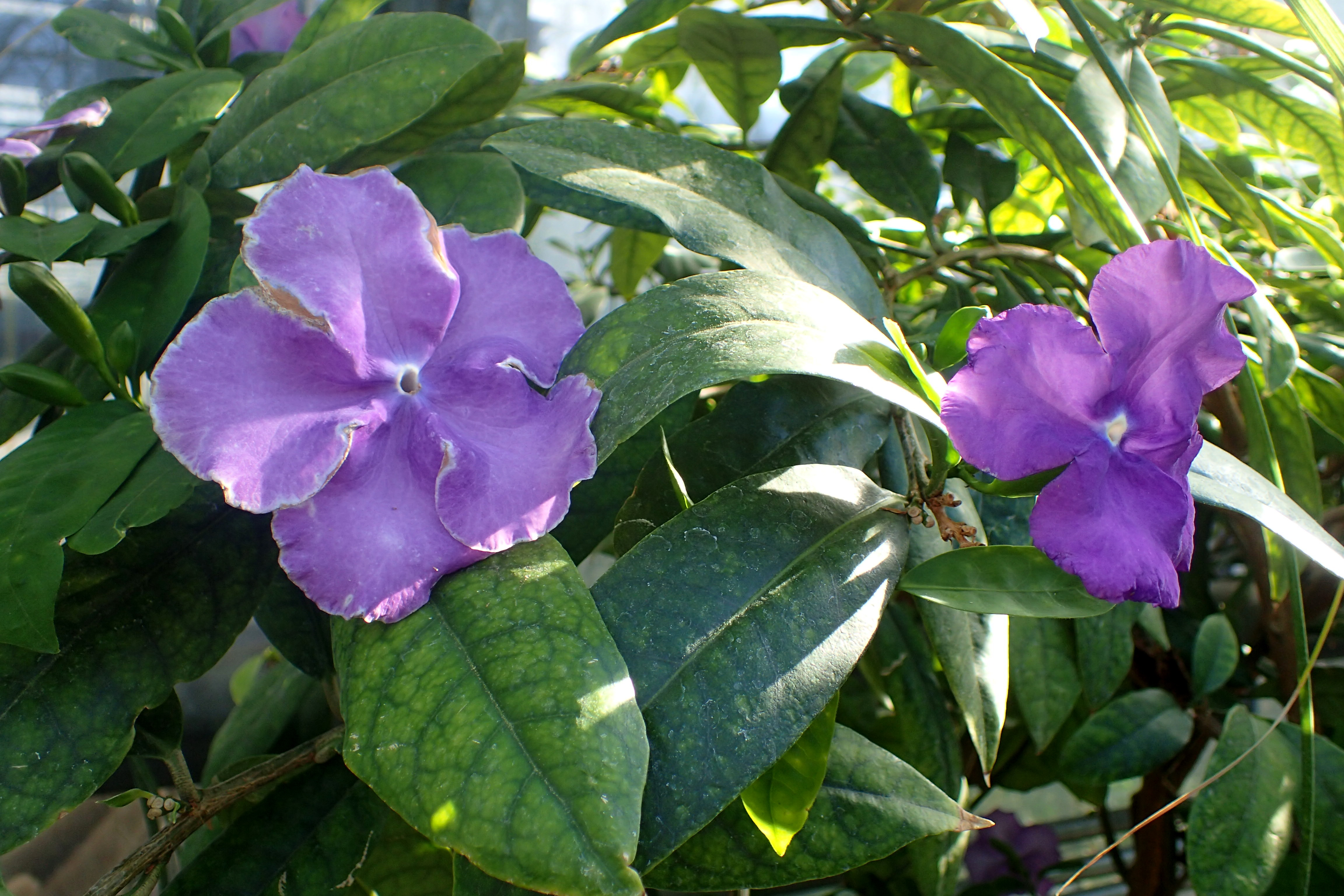

Scientific classification
- Kingdom: Plantae
- Clade: Tracheophytes
- Clade: Angiosperms
- Clade: Eudicots
- Clade: Asterids
- Order: Solanales
- Family: Solanaceae
- Genus: Brunfelsia
- Species: B. pauciflora

Binomial name
- Brunfelsia pauciflora (Cham. & Schltdl.) Benth.

Synonyms
- Brunfelsia calycina Benth. (basionym); Brunfelsia pauciflora var. calycina (Benth.) J. A. Schmidt; Franciscea pauciflora Cham. & Schltdl. (basionym)

= Brunfelsia pauciflora =

Species of flowering plant in the nightshade family

Brunfelsia pauciflora is a species of flowering plant in the family Solanaceae, the nightshades. It is endemic to Brazil, and it is grown in cultivation. A shrubby perennial plant grown in gardens, its common names include yesterday-today-and-tomorrow, morning-noon-and-night, kiss-me-quick, and Brazil raintree.

Cultivars bred for ornamental use include the common 'Eximia', the smaller, more floriferous 'Floribunda', and 'Macrantha', which has larger flowers without white throats. This plant has gained the Royal Horticultural Society's Award of Garden Merit.

== Nomenclature ==
The genus name Brunfelsia commemorates sixteenth century German monk, Otto Brunfels. The specific epithet pauciflora is Latin for 'few-flowered'.

== Description ==
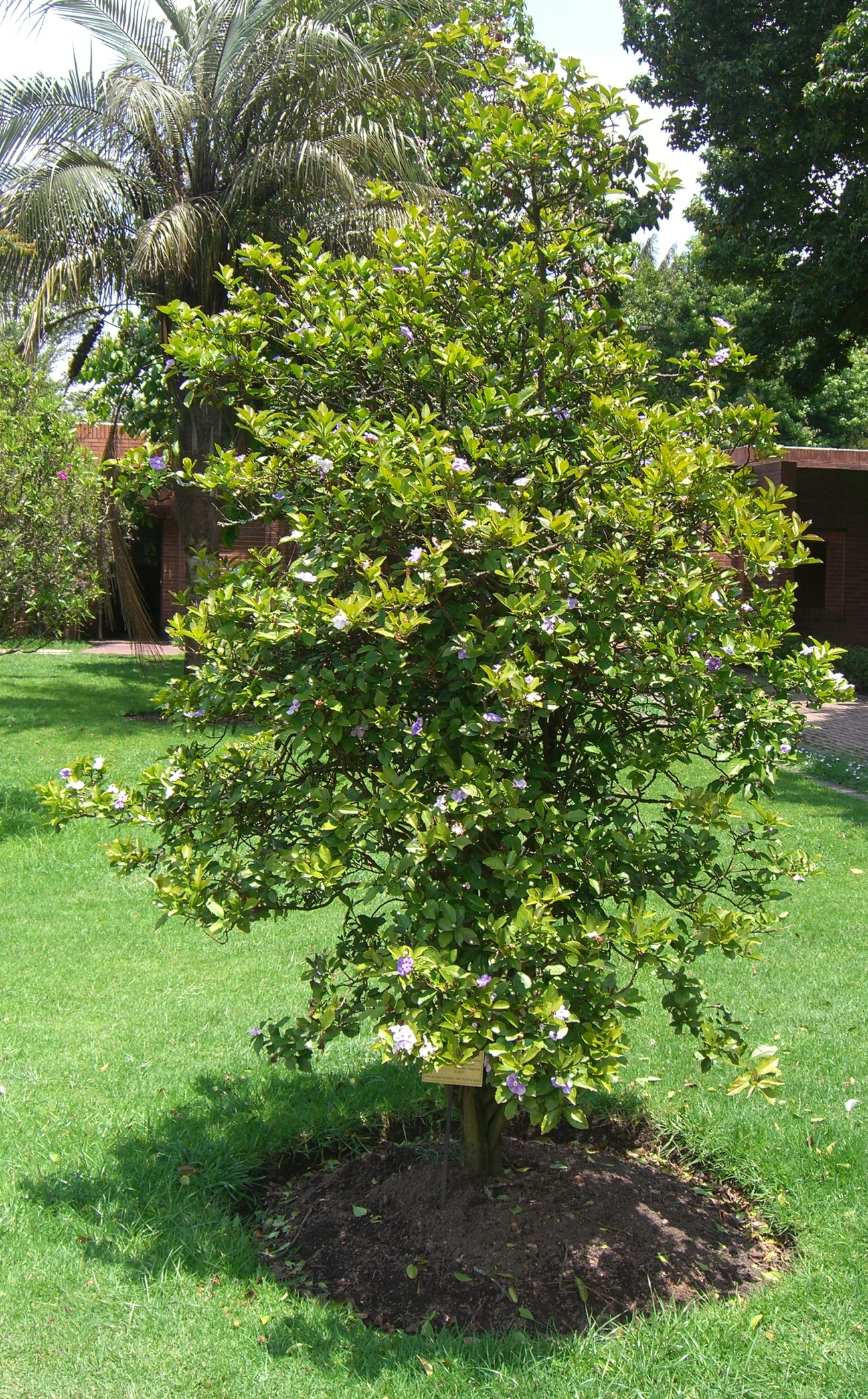
Shrub setting

This species is a shrub up to 2.4 meters (7 ft 10 in) tall by 1.5 meters (4 ft 11 in) wide whose bark is greyish brown and mostly smooth and only occasionally interrupted by longitudinal cracks. The sparsely existing branches stand upright to spread. The dark green, smooth branches are strong and glabrous, rarely covered with fluff-haired or glandular trichomes.

The leathery leaves are up to 16 centimeters (6.3 in) long, dark green on top and paler on the undersides. The leaves are distributed on the branches or as a group at the branch tips. The hairless petioles have a length of 5 to 12 mm. The firmly membranous to almost leathery leaf blade is 6.5 to 16 cm (2.6 to 6.3 in) long and 2 to 6.5 cm (0.8 to 2.6 in) wide, elongated to elongate-lanceolate, rarely elliptic-oblong to ovate-elongated. The tip is pointed to short pointed, rarely blunted to notched. The base of the leaf blade is wedge-shaped to tapered. The leaf surface is glabrous or dotted on the underside of the midrib or slightly glandular hairy. The top is dark green, dull to shiny, the underside is light green. From the midrib go five to eleven side veins that run straight or in a wide arc.

The four stamens set in the upper part of the floral tube, the white stamens are almost circular, somewhat trough-shaped in the direction of the dust bag. The upper pair of stamens has 4 to 6 mm long stamens, the lower stamens are 2 to 4 mm long. The greenish-brown anthers are 1.5 to 2 mm long and circular to kidney-shaped. The bright green ovary is 2 to 3 mm high and has a diameter of 1.5 mm, it is conical-ovate shaped. The thread-like stylus has a length of 25 to 30 mm and is coloured lavender. The scar is bilobed, white, 1 mm long, the scar lobes are slightly different in size.

=== Fruit ===
With the ripe fruit, the stems are thicker and corky-warty. The light to dark green colored calyx is 18 to 32 mm (0.71 to 1.26 in) long and has a diameter of 6 to 10 mm. It is tubular or rarely tubular-bellied or puffy, with glandular trichomes or completely hairless, firmly membranous to almost leathery. The calyx teeth are 3 to 8 mm long, ovate to ovate-lanceolate, they rest on the petal, the tips are pointed to tapered. On the fruit the cup is bell-shaped - urn-shaped, becomes firm and thick leathery, something enlarges and encloses the fruit completely.

The capsule, which is ripening between midwinter and early spring, is 20 to 22 mm long, 15 to 18 mm in diameter and almost spherical to ovate. The surface is smooth and light green, the pericarp is thin and dried at maturity. The capsule is slightly springing up. Each capsule contains 12 to 30 seeds, 5 to 6 mm long and 2.5 to 3 mm in diameter. They are ovate to elongate, angled and dark red-brown in colour. The surface is dotted net-like. The embryo is about 5 mm long, straight, the cotyledons are 2 to 3 mm long and flat egg-shaped.

=== Flowers ===
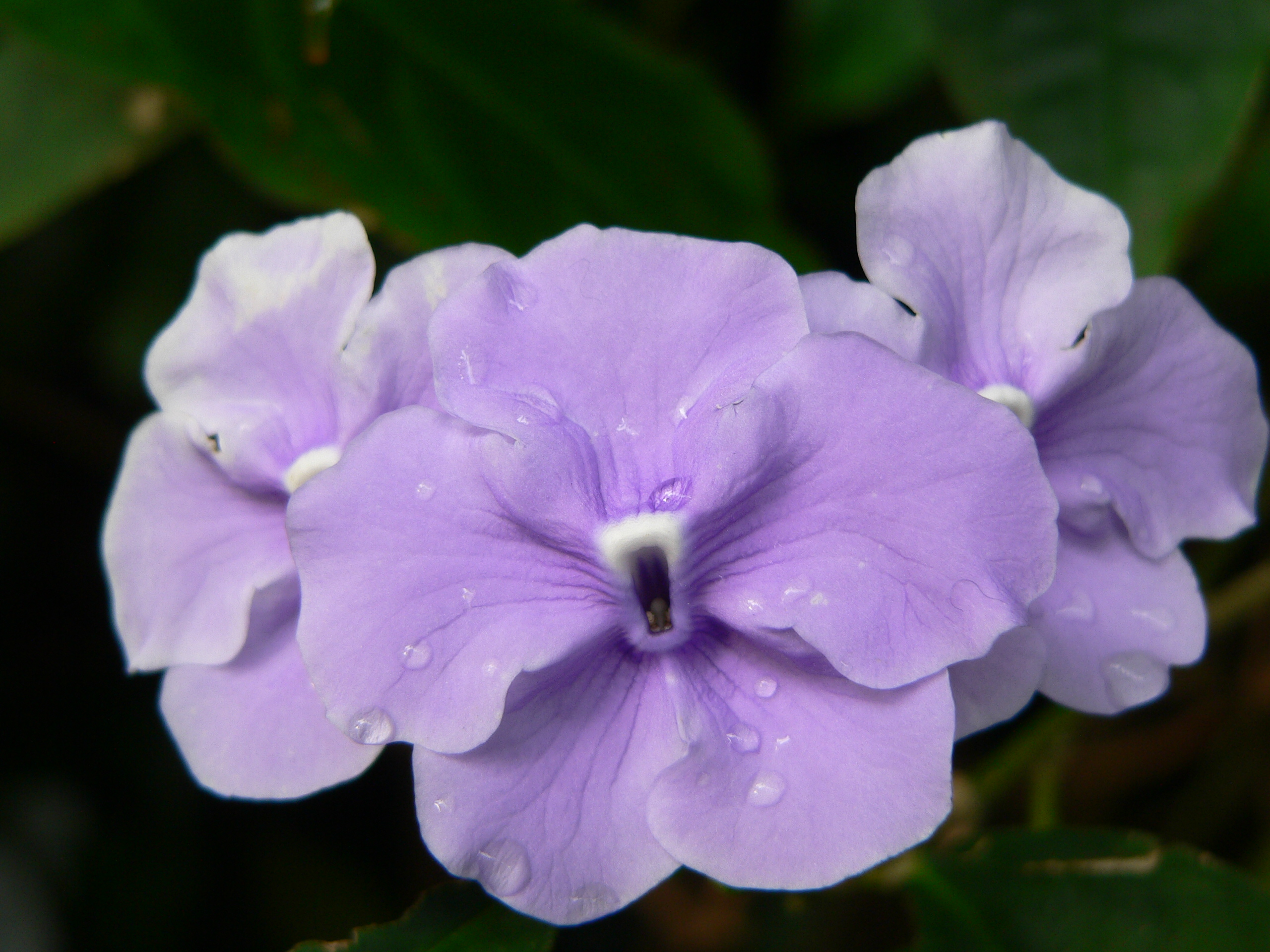
Flower closeup

Flowers are borne in cymes of up to 10. The flower is about 5 centimeters long. It blooms purple with a white throat, then turns lavender and then white. The shrub has all three flower colours at once as more bloom. This plant is toxic, especially the fruit. The inflorescences are terminal, are sitting or almost sitting and consist of one to eleven flowers . Each flower is supported by one to three foliage-like bracts, which are 1 to 8 mm long, linear-lanceolate, concave and narrowly pointed. They may be glabrous or glandular. The plant blooms from autumn to early summer. The flowers are on 11 to 25 (rarely to 35) mm long, vigorous flower stems, which are upright, towards the tip are slightly wider, hairy or slightly glandular hairy.

The crown is made up of five overgrown petals, it is initially deep red-purple and fades over the flowering phase to a very light lavender colour or white. At the transition between the petal and coronary band, white dots appear, the edge of the crown is occasionally violet colored.

The petal is 28 to 36 mm long and has a diameter of 1.5 to 3 mm, is just as long to twice as long as the goblet. At the end of the corolla tube forms an elliptical, white ring, which is 4 to 5 mm long. The lobes have a length of 15 to 30 mm, are widely rounded to almost elliptic, the tip is rounded-cut to dull, laterally overlapping more or less.

== Range ==
It occurs mainly on the Atlantic facing slopes of the Serra do Mar in southeastern Brazil. The distribution areas are located in the state of Rio de Janeiro to Santa Catarina, where they range from sea level to altitudes of 1,500 m (4,900 ft). Most are found in pluvial rainforests with an annual rainfall of up to 1,600 mm (63 in). One finds plants of the kind on shady river banks and ravines, as well as in forests in damp, well draining soils.

== Toxicity ==
The roots of several species corresponding to the genus Brunfelsia contain substances whose consumption can cause problems in human health according to the compendium published by the European Food Safety Authority in 2012. In particular they contain indole alkaloids derived from Beta-carboline such as harmine, tetrahydroharmine, harmaline, manacin, manacein, and dimethyltryptamine and amidine derivatives such as pyrrole 3-carboxamidine.

== Gallery ==
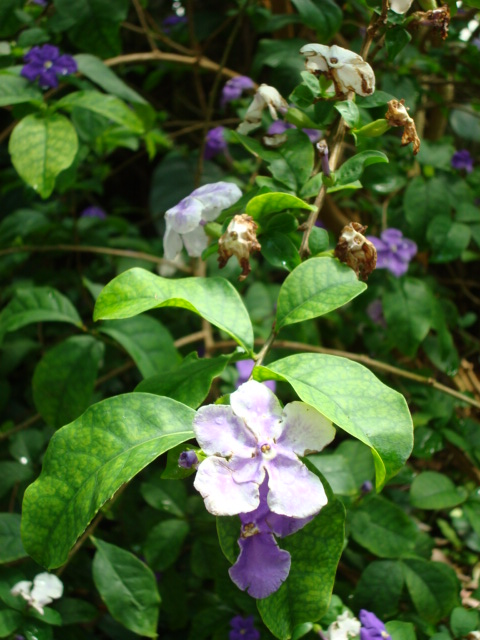
Cultivated plant, Chicago Botanic Garden

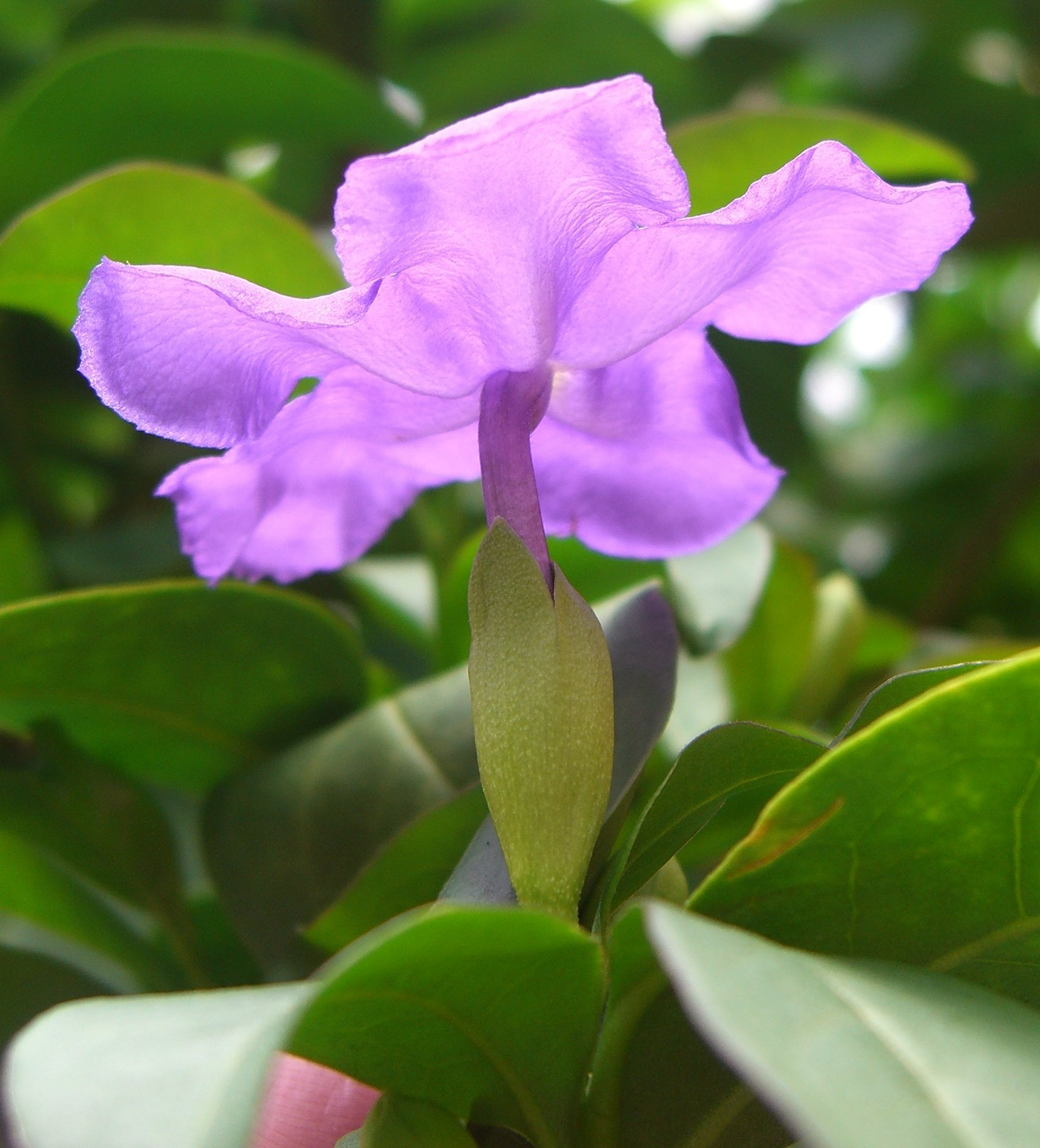
Blossom

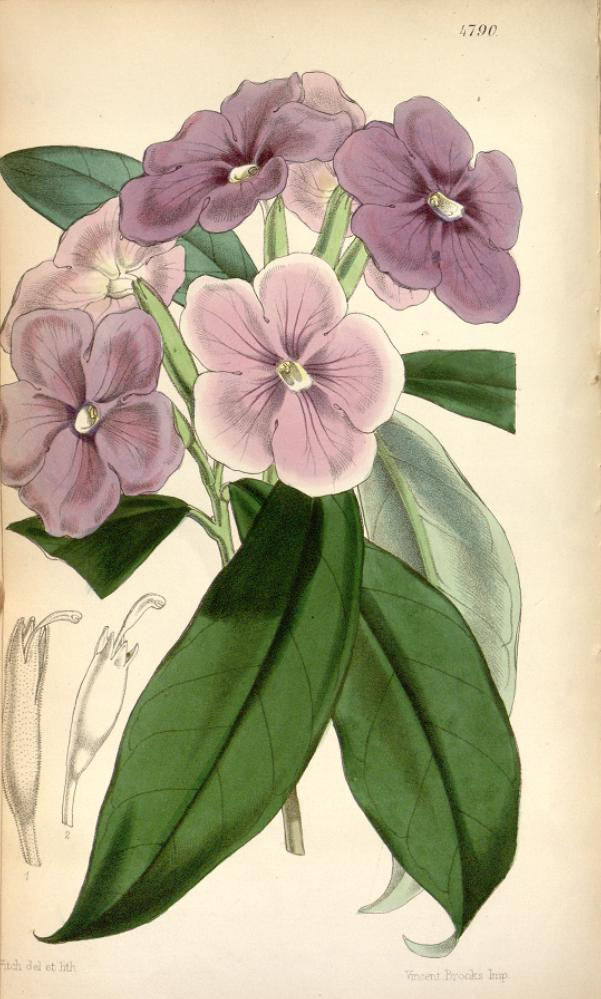
Botanical illustration

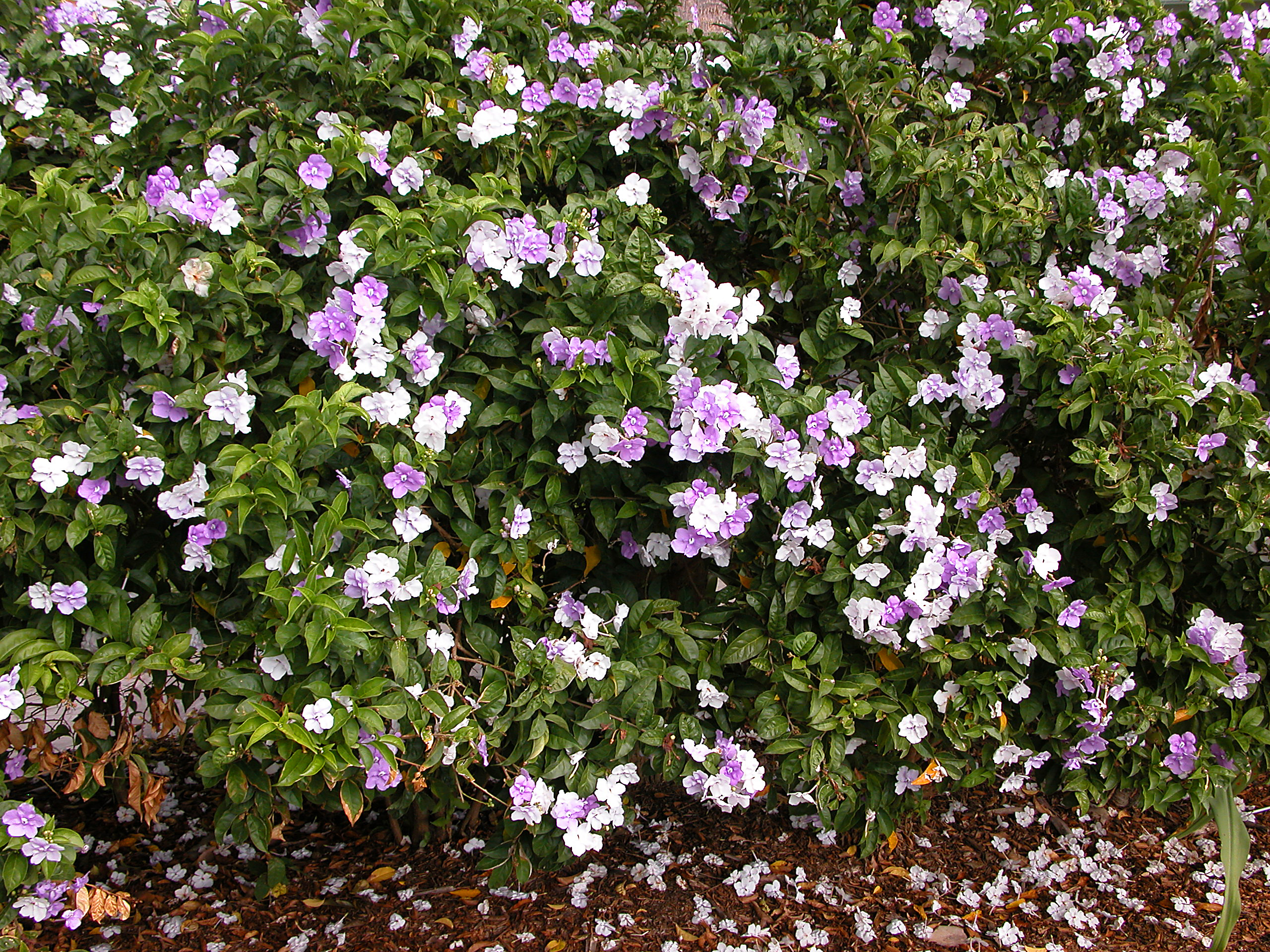
Sprawling shrub with many flowers

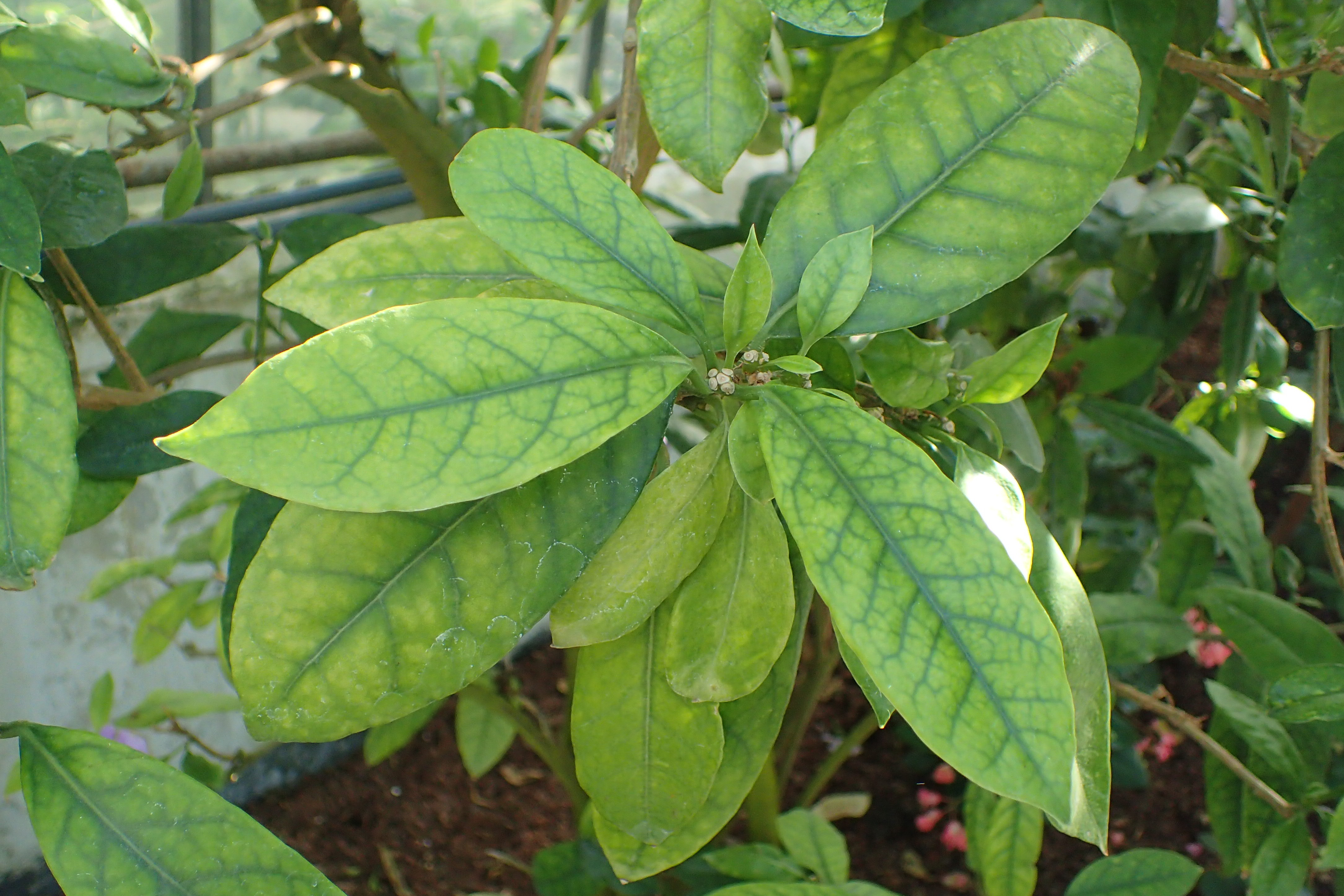
Leaves

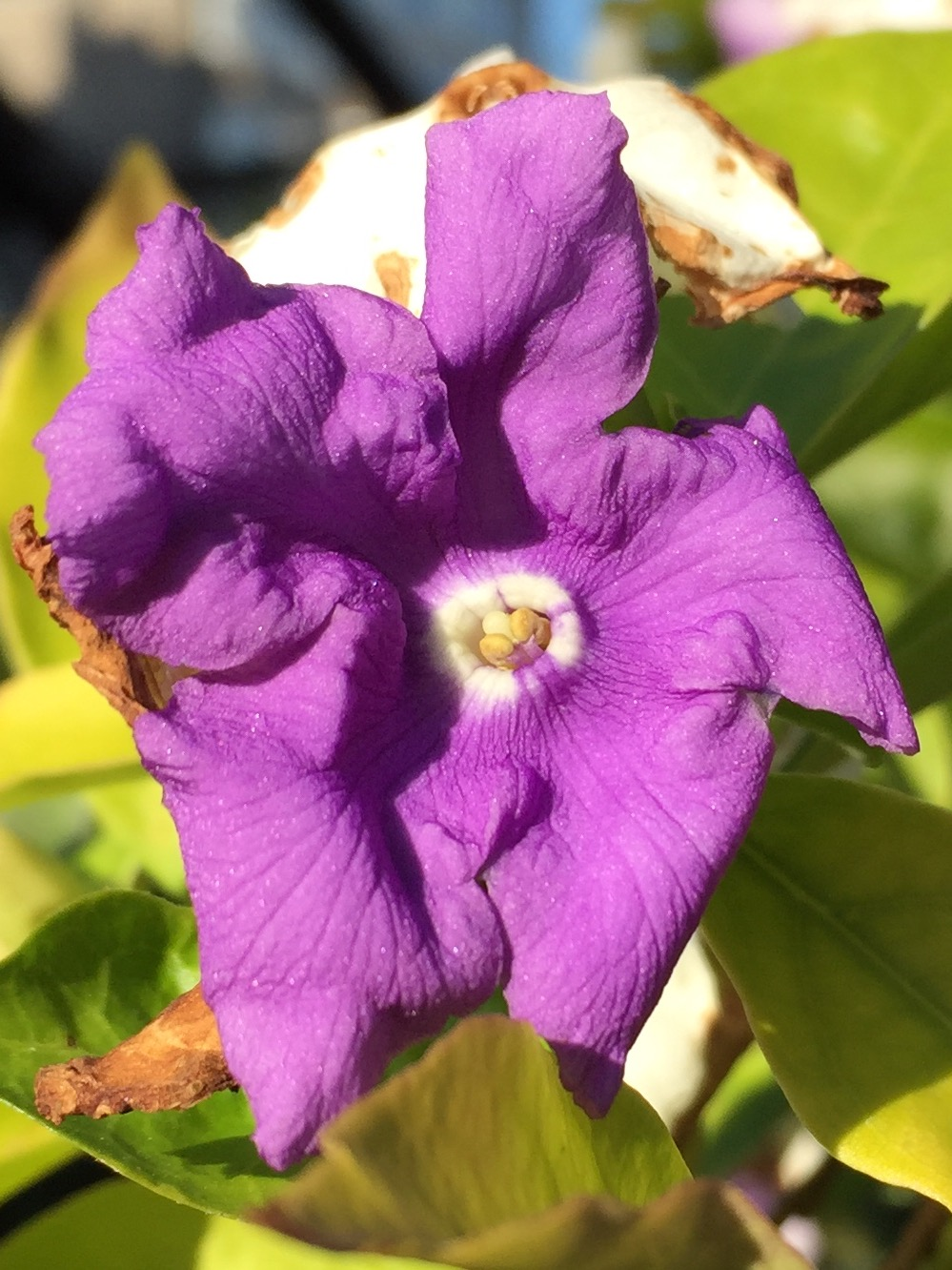
Flower closeup

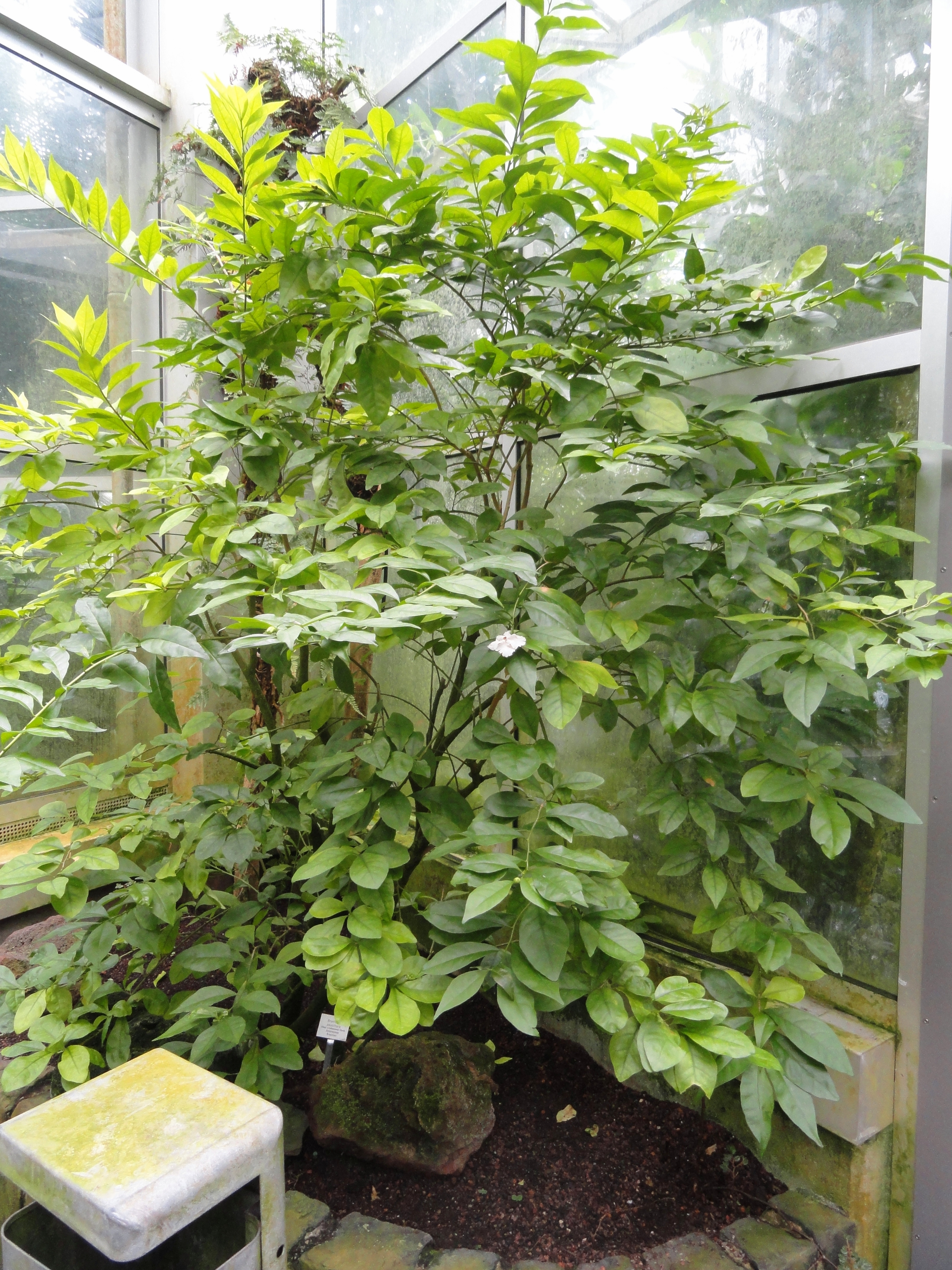
Growing in a greenhouse

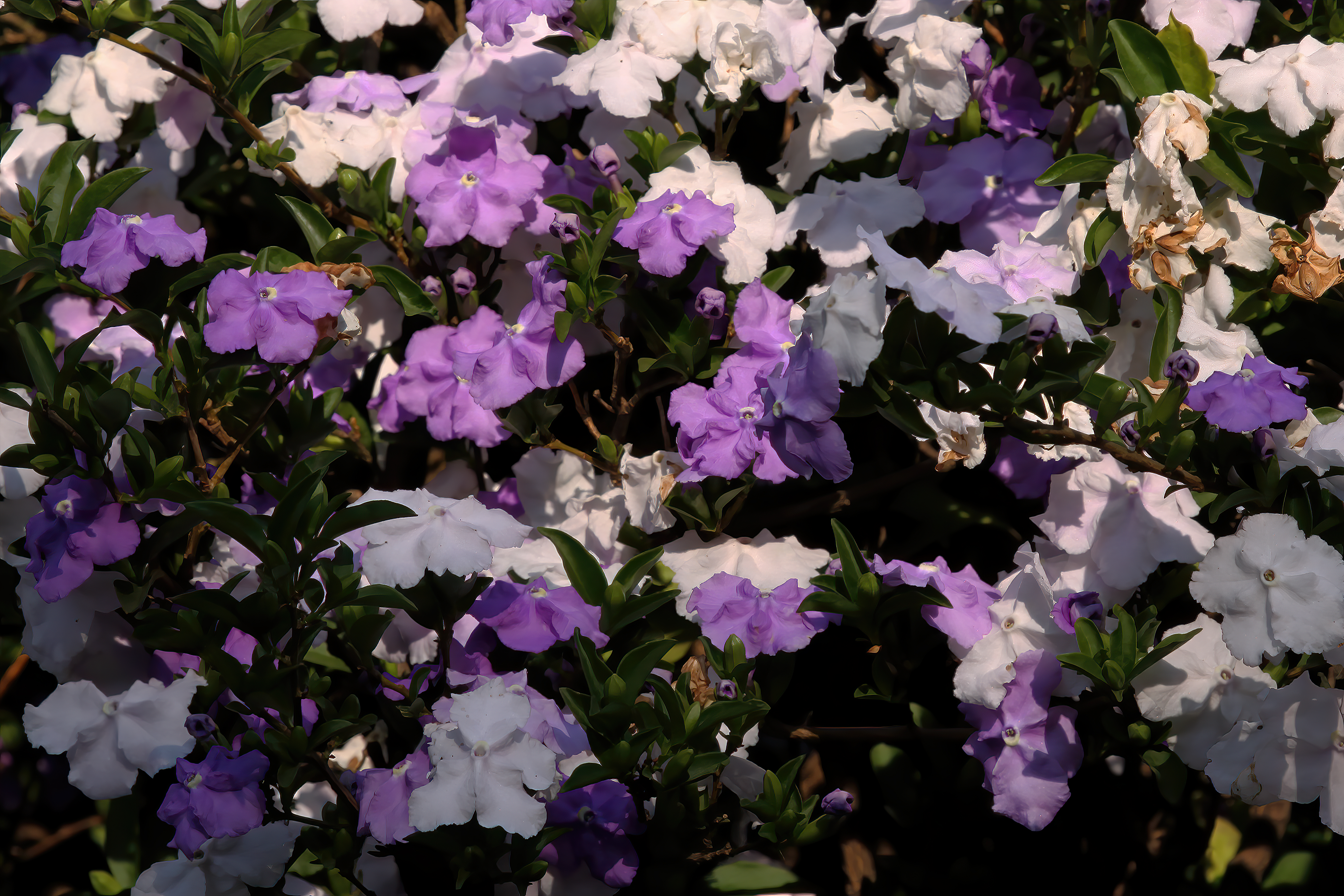
Bunch of flowers
