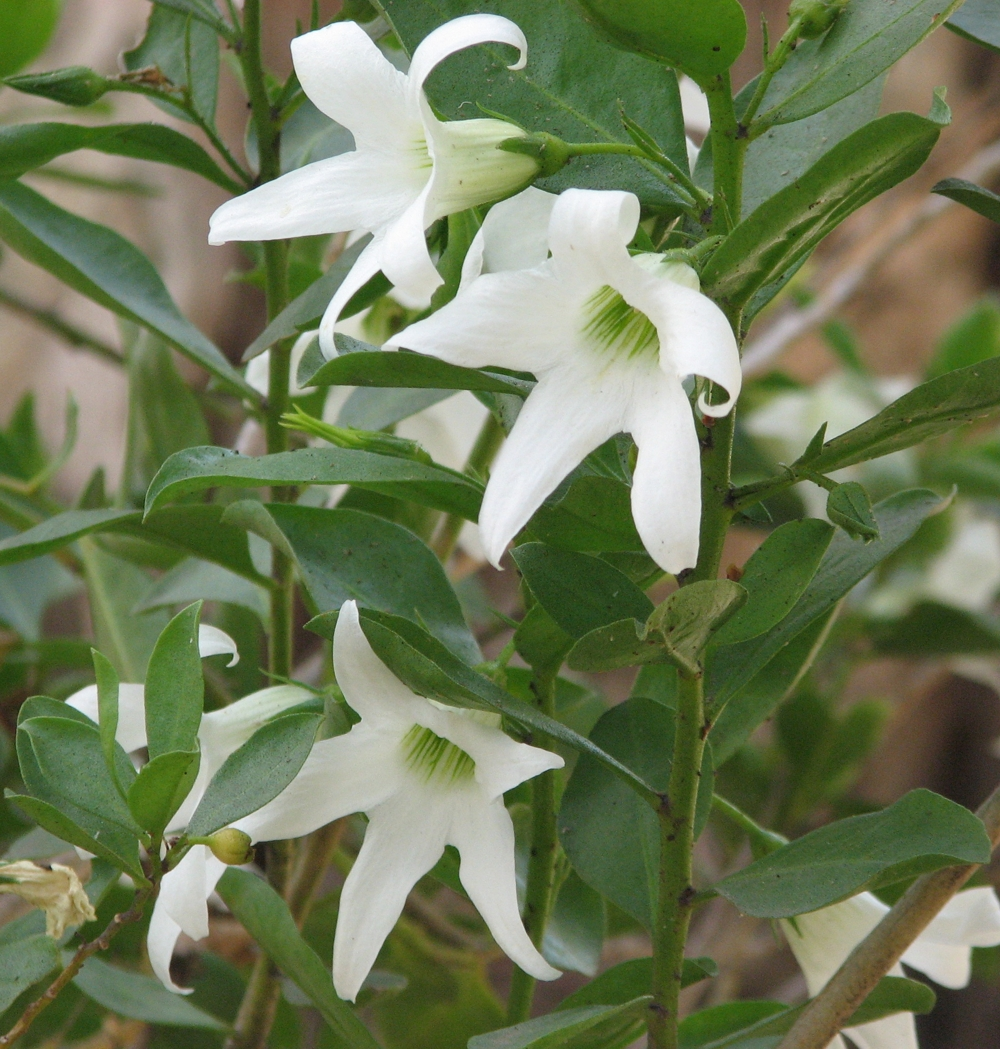
- Anthocercis viscosa

Scientific classification
- Kingdom: Plantae
- Clade: Tracheophytes
- Clade: Angiosperms
- Clade: Eudicots
- Clade: Asterids
- Order: Solanales
- Family: Solanaceae
- Subfamily: Nicotianoideae; Miers

Genera
- See text

= Nicotianoideae =

Subfamily of flowering plants

Nicotianoideae is a subfamily within the family Solanaceae. Most genera are found in Australia, but they are also found in America and Africa. The subfamily contains eight genera and about 125 species, 90 of them are included in Nicotiana.

Genera:
Anthocercis
Anthotroche
Crenidium
Cyphanthera
Duboisia
Grammosolen
Nicotiana
Symonanthus
