= Markea epifita =

Conservation status
- Vulnerable (IUCN 3.1)

Scientific classification
- Kingdom: Plantae
- Clade: Tracheophytes
- Clade: Angiosperms
- Clade: Eudicots
- Clade: Asterids
- Order: Solanales
- Family: Solanaceae
- Genus: Markea
- Species: M. epifita

Binomial name
- Markea epifita S.Knapp

Species of flowering plant

Markea epifita is a species of plant in the family Solanaceae. It is endemic to Ecuador.
