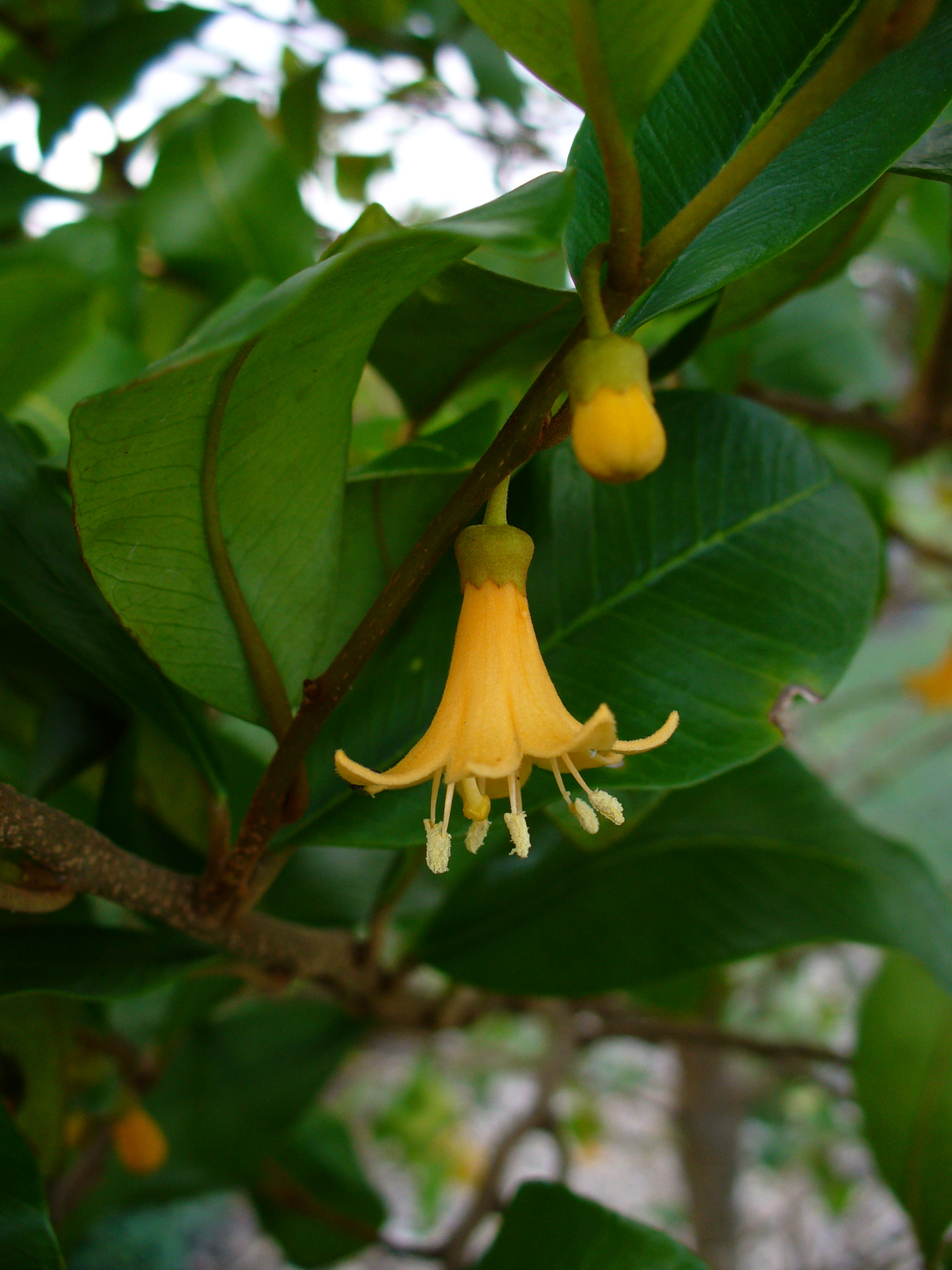

Conservation status
- Endangered (IUCN 3.1)

Scientific classification
- Kingdom: Plantae
- Clade: Tracheophytes
- Clade: Angiosperms
- Clade: Eudicots
- Clade: Asterids
- Order: Solanales
- Family: Solanaceae
- Genus: Goetzea
- Species: G. elegans

Binomial name
- Goetzea elegans Wydler

Synonyms
- Ilex exandra Bello; Ilex hexandra Bello ex A.Stahl

= Goetzea elegans =

Species of plant

Goetzea elegans, also called beautiful goetzea, mata buey, or matabuey (Spanish: ox-killer), is a species of plant in the Solanaceae or nightshade family of flowering plants. It is endemic to Puerto Rico. Today it is limited to the northwestern corner of the island because of deforestation and other consumption of its habitat for human use. It is federally listed as an endangered species in the island.

This is a shrub or a tree which can reach 9 metres (30 ft) in height. The leaves are shiny dark green and oval in shape. It bears yellow-orange, funnel-shaped flowers. The fruit is a yellow-orange berry up to 2.5 centimetres (0.98 in) long. As its common name in Spanish suggests, it may be poisonous.

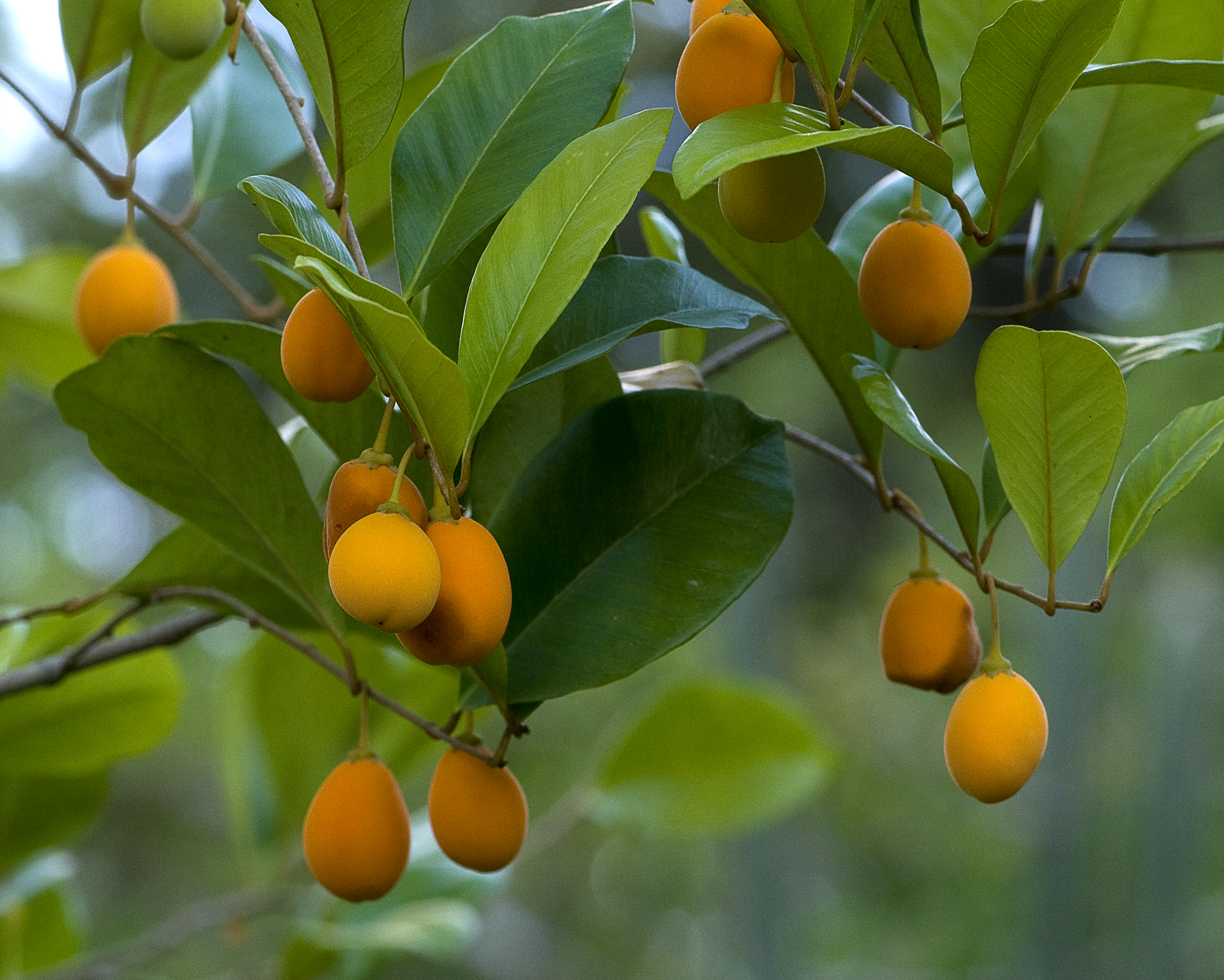
Goetzea elegans fruit.
