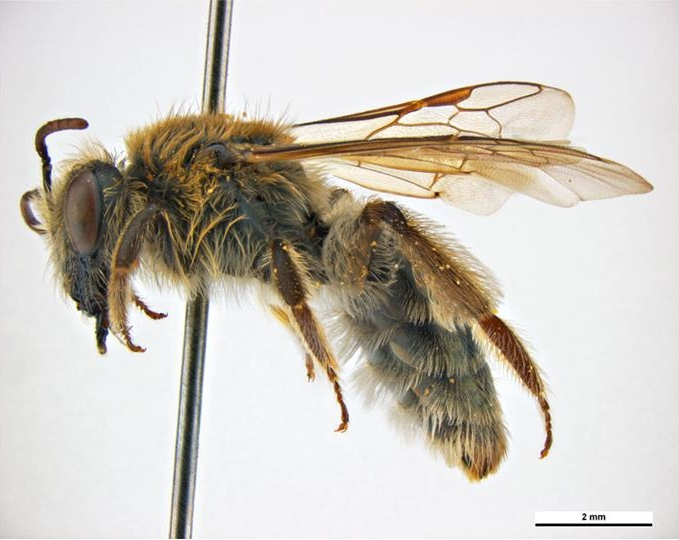
- Female

Scientific classification
- Kingdom: Animalia
- Phylum: Arthropoda
- Clade: Pancrustacea
- Class: Insecta
- Order: Hymenoptera
- Family: Colletidae
- Genus: Leioproctus
- Species: L. heterodoxus

Binomial name
- Leioproctus heterodoxus (Cockerell, 1916)

Synonyms
- Notocolletes heterodoxus Cockerell, 1916

= Leioproctus heterodoxus =

Species of bee

Leioproctus heterodoxus, or Leioproctus (Euryglossidia) heterodoxus, is a species of bee in the family Colletidae and subfamily Colletinae. It is endemic to Australia. It was described by British-American entomologist Theodore Dru Alison Cockerell in 1916.

== Description ==
Male body length is nearly 11 mm. Colouration is mainly black, the abdomen "dark dull blue-green", with "long erect very pale ochreous-tinted hair".

== Distribution and habitat ==
The species occurs in south-eastern Australia. The type locality is the Gawler district in South Australia.

== Behaviour ==
The adults are solitary flying mellivores that nest gregariously in the ground. Flowering plants visited by the bees include Harmsiodoxa brevipes and Cyphanthera albicans as well as Arctotheca and Calotis species.

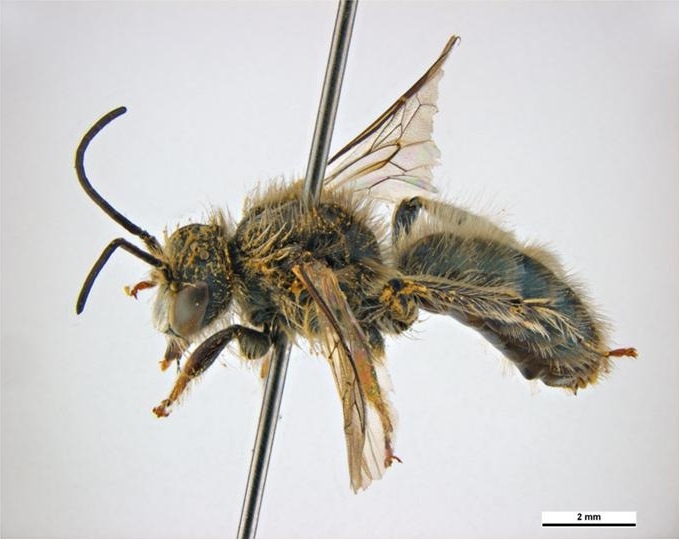
Male
