= Markea spruceana =

Conservation status
- Vulnerable (IUCN 3.1)

Scientific classification
- Kingdom: Plantae
- Clade: Tracheophytes
- Clade: Angiosperms
- Clade: Eudicots
- Clade: Asterids
- Order: Solanales
- Family: Solanaceae
- Genus: Markea
- Species: M. spruceana

Binomial name
- Markea spruceana Hunz.

Species of flowering plant

Markea spruceana is a species of plant in the family Solanaceae. It is endemic to Ecuador.
