= Anthocercis gracilis =

Conservation status
- Vulnerable (EPBC Act)

Scientific classification
- Kingdom: Plantae
- Clade: Tracheophytes
- Clade: Angiosperms
- Clade: Eudicots
- Clade: Asterids
- Order: Solanales
- Family: Solanaceae
- Genus: Anthocercis
- Species: A. gracilis

Binomial name
- Anthocercis gracilis Benth.

Species of flowering plant

Anthocercis gracilis, also known as slender tailflower, is a rare species of shrub in the family Solanaceae. It is native to Western Australia where it grows on sandy or loamy soils, and on granite outcrops. It is a spindly, erect shrub which can grow to 1 m high. Its yellow-green flowers may be seen from September to October.

The species was first formally described by George Bentham in 1846.
