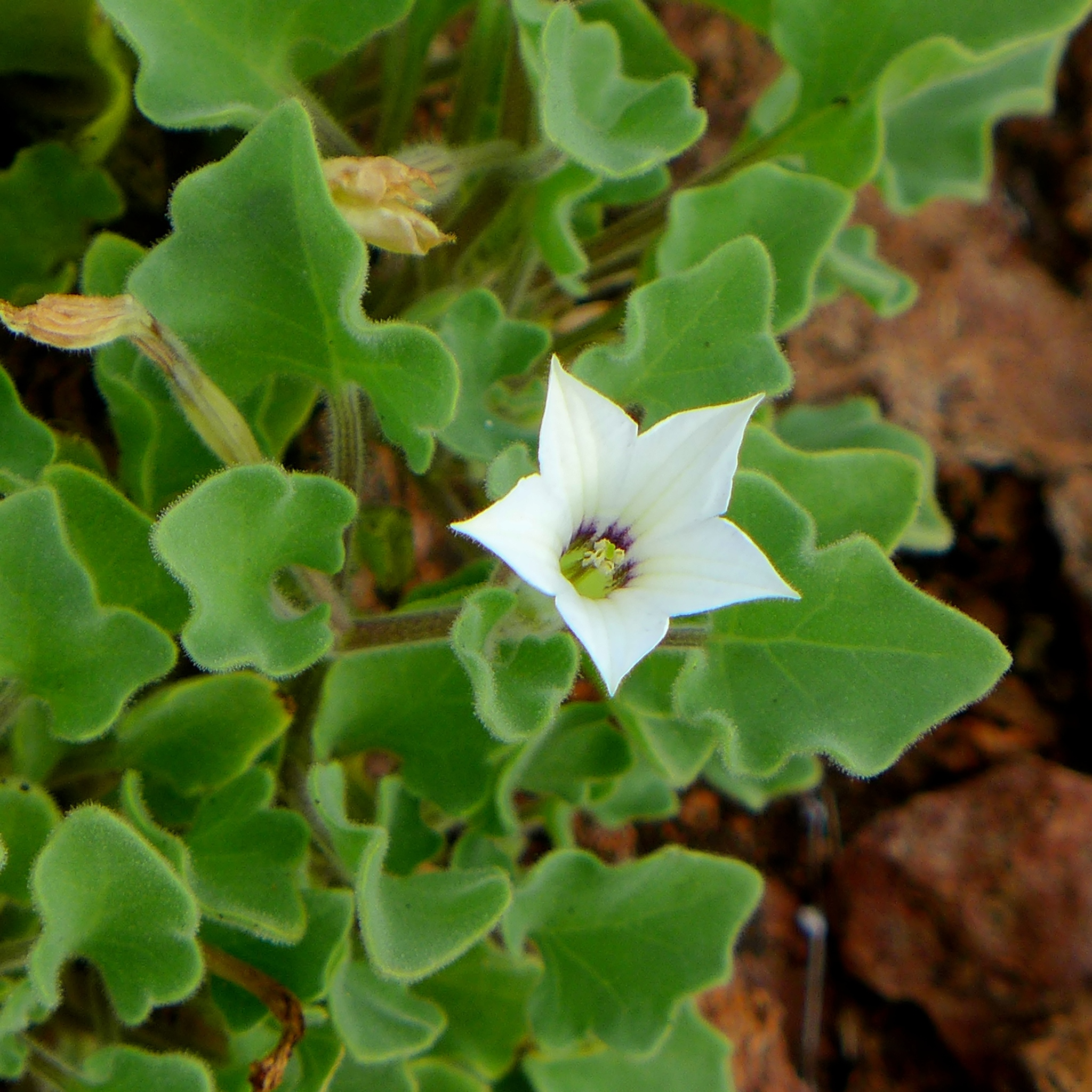

Conservation status
- Least Concern (IUCN 3.1)

Scientific classification
- Kingdom: Plantae
- Clade: Embryophytes
- Clade: Tracheophytes
- Clade: Spermatophytes
- Clade: Angiosperms
- Clade: Eudicots
- Clade: Asterids
- Order: Solanales
- Family: Solanaceae
- Genus: Exodeconus
- Species: E. miersii

Binomial name
- Exodeconus miersii (Hook.f.) D'Arcy

= Exodeconus miersii =

Species of plant

Exodeconus miersii is a species of flowering plant in the Solanaceae (nightshade) family. Its botanical name refers to the English botanist John Miers (1789 - 1879), who studied flora in South America. This flower is endemic to the Galapagos Islands, and is thus often called by the common name Galapagos Shore Petunia. The International Union for Conservation of Nature (IUCN) considers it to be among plant species of least concern.

This plant has five further synonyms:

- Cacabus miersii (Hook.f.) Wettst. in H.G.A.Engler & K.A.E.Prantl, Nat. Pflanzenfam. 4(3b): 16 (1891);
- Dictyocalyx miersii Hook.f. in Trans. Linn. Soc. London 20: 203 (1847);
- Cacabus hookeri A.Stewart in Proc. Calif. Acad. Sci., ser. 4, 1: 137 (1911);
- Thinogeton hookeri Andersson in Kongl. Vetensk. Acad. Handl. 1853: 217 (1855);
- Thinogeton miersii Miers in Ann. Mag. Nat. Hist., ser. 2, 4: 359 (1849).

== Description ==
Exodeconus miersii is a creeping plant with large, hairy, light green leaves that form a dense ground cover. It has large white trumpet-shaped flowers. It is drought tolerant. Its fruit is a capsule having an elongate ovate shape. The trumpet-shaped flowers have green veins.

== Range and habitat ==
Exodeconus miersii is present widely on the Galapagos Islands, where it grows on rocks and sandy soils. This flowering plant has a coastal habitat, as indicated by its common name. Sometimes it inhabits arid lowlands, but more often is found along shorelines.

The particular islands in the Galapagos where it is likely to be encountered are these: (1) Española Island at Punta Suarez; (2) Fernandina Island at Punta Espinosa; (3) Genovesa Island at Darwin Bay; and (4) Isabela Island (a.k.a. Albemarle Island) at Tagus Cove and Urbina Bay. According to John Miers, Charles Darwin studied these flowers at Albemarle Island (which is the same as Isabela Island).
