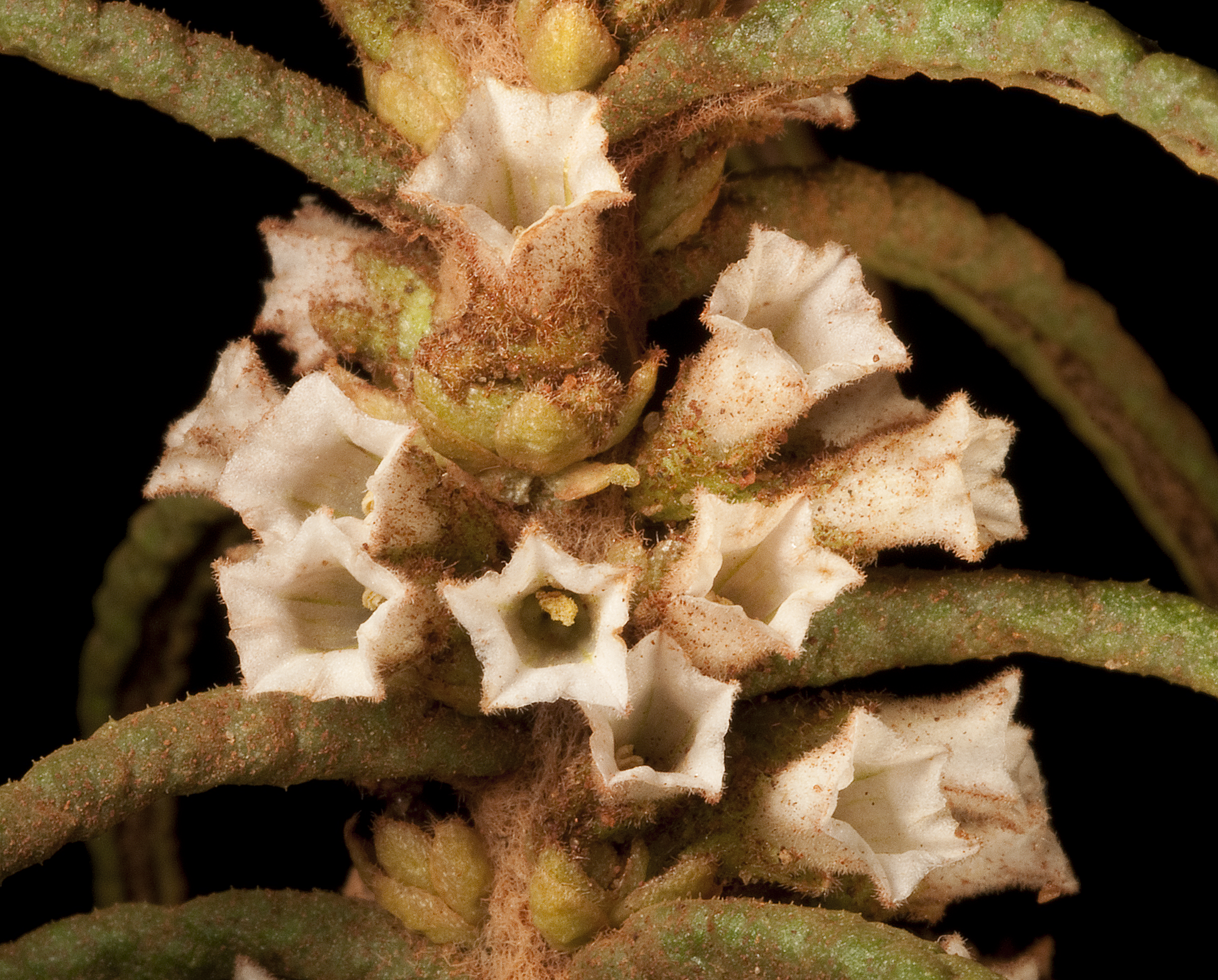
- Flowers

Scientific classification
- Kingdom: Plantae
- Clade: Tracheophytes
- Clade: Angiosperms
- Clade: Eudicots
- Clade: Asterids
- Order: Solanales
- Family: Solanaceae
- Genus: Symonanthus
- Species: S. aromaticus

Binomial name
- Symonanthus aromaticus (C.A.Gardner) Haegi

Synonyms
- Anthocercis aromatica C.A.Gardner

= Symonanthus aromaticus =

Species of flowering plant

Symonanthus aromaticus is a species of flowering plant in the potato family that is endemic to Australia.

== Description ==
The species grows as an erect shrub to 30–130 cm in height. The white flowers appear from August to November.

== Distribution and habitat ==
The species is found on sandy soils in the Coolgardie and Mallee IBRA bioregions of south-west Western Australia.
