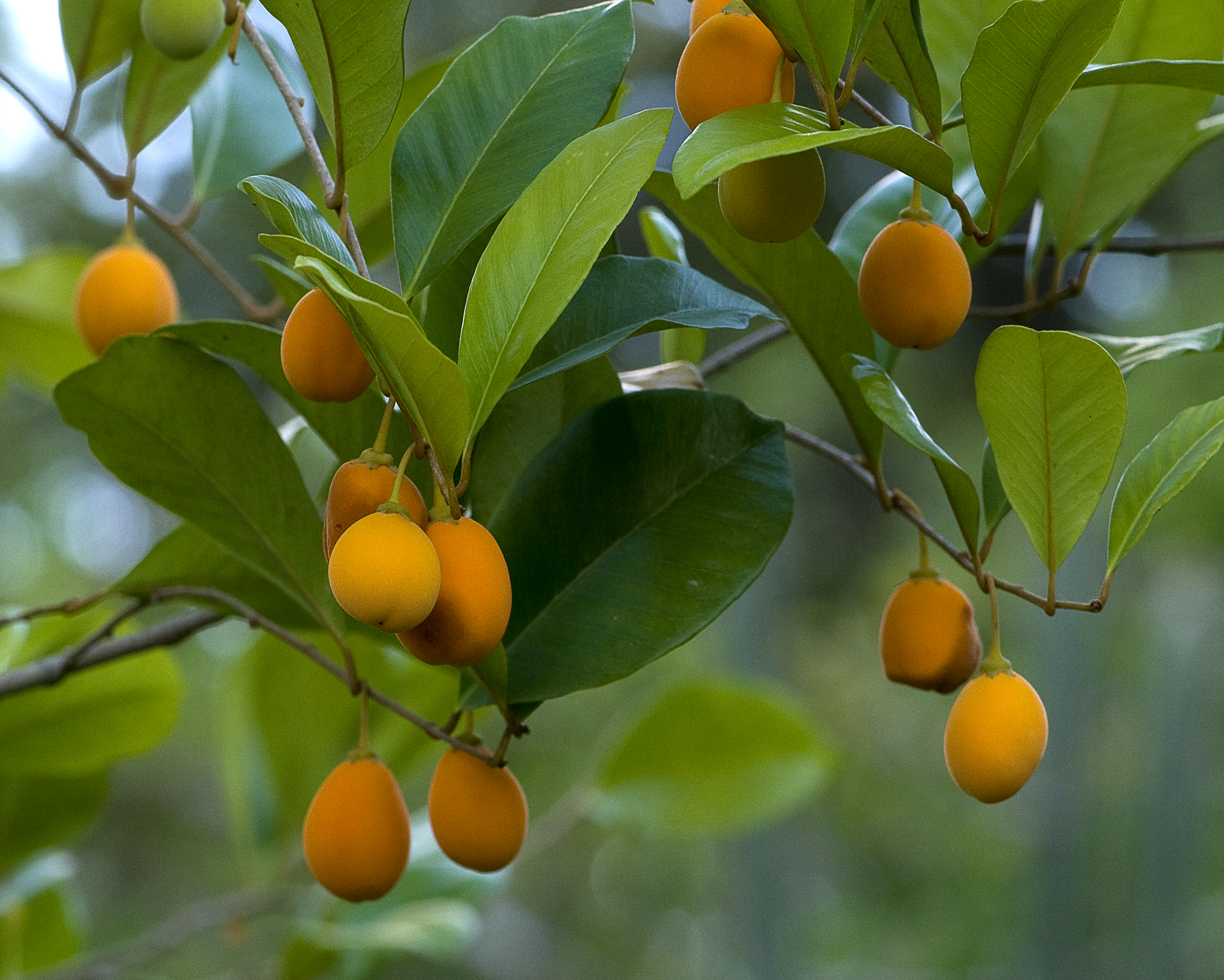
- Goetzea elegans

Scientific classification
- Kingdom: Plantae
- Clade: Tracheophytes
- Clade: Angiosperms
- Clade: Eudicots
- Clade: Asterids
- Order: Solanales
- Family: Solanaceae
- Subfamily: Goetzeoideae
- Genus: Goetzea; Wydler

= Goetzea =

Genus of flowering plants

Goetzea is a genus of plant in the family Solanaceae. It was originally placed by H. Wydler in the family Ebenaceae and named for his teacher the Rev. Johann August Ephraim Goetze. It was for about half a century included in the now defunct family Goetzeaceae Miers ex Airy Shaw.

== Note ==
Not to be confused with Goetzea, Rchb., a genus belonging to the Fabaceae (the bean family).

== Species ==
- Goetzea amoena Griseb.
- Goetzea eggersii Urban ex Radlk.
- Goetzea ekmanii O.E.Schulz ex O.C.Schmidt
- Goetzea elegans Wydler

== Notes ==
- Santiago-Valentin, E.; Olmstead, R.G. (2003). "Phylogenetics of the Antillean Goetzeoideae (Solanaceae) and Their Relationships within the Solanaceae based on Chloroplast and ITS DNA Sequence Data" (PDF). Systematic Botany. 28 (2): 452–460. doi:10.1043/0363-6445-28.2.452 (inactive 12 July 2025). JSTOR 3094013.
