= Trianaea naeka =

Conservation status
- Vulnerable (IUCN 3.1)

Scientific classification
- Kingdom: Plantae
- Clade: Tracheophytes
- Clade: Angiosperms
- Clade: Eudicots
- Clade: Asterids
- Order: Solanales
- Family: Solanaceae
- Genus: Trianaea
- Species: T. naeka

Binomial name
- Trianaea naeka S.Knapp

Species of plant

Trianaea naeka is a species of plant in the family Solanaceae. It is endemic to Ecuador. Its natural habitat is subtropical or tropical moist montane forests.
