= Symonanthus bancroftii =

Conservation status
- Endangered (EPBC Act)

Scientific classification
- Kingdom: Plantae
- Clade: Tracheophytes
- Clade: Angiosperms
- Clade: Eudicots
- Clade: Asterids
- Order: Solanales
- Family: Solanaceae
- Genus: Symonanthus
- Species: S. bancroftii

Binomial name
- Symonanthus bancroftii (F.Muell.) Haegi

Synonyms
- Isandra bancroftii F.Muell.

Species of flowering plant

Symonanthus bancroftii, also known as Bancroft's Symonanthus, is a species of flowering plant in the potato family that is endemic to Australia.

== Etymology ==
The specific epithet bancroftii honours Queensland surgeon Joseph Bancroft for his pharmacological research on Australian plants.

== Description ==
The species grows as an erect shrub to 1 m in height, covered with grey hairs. The oval leaves are 8 mm long and 4.5 mm wide. The flowers are dull yellow-green, with the corolla 5–6 mm long. The fruit is a shiny round red berry 5–10 mm in diameter.

== Distribution and habitat ==
Bancroft's Symonanthus is very rare and known only from a few localities in the south-eastern Wheatbelt region of south-west Western Australia.

== Conservation ==
The species is listed as Endangered under Australia's EPBC Act.
