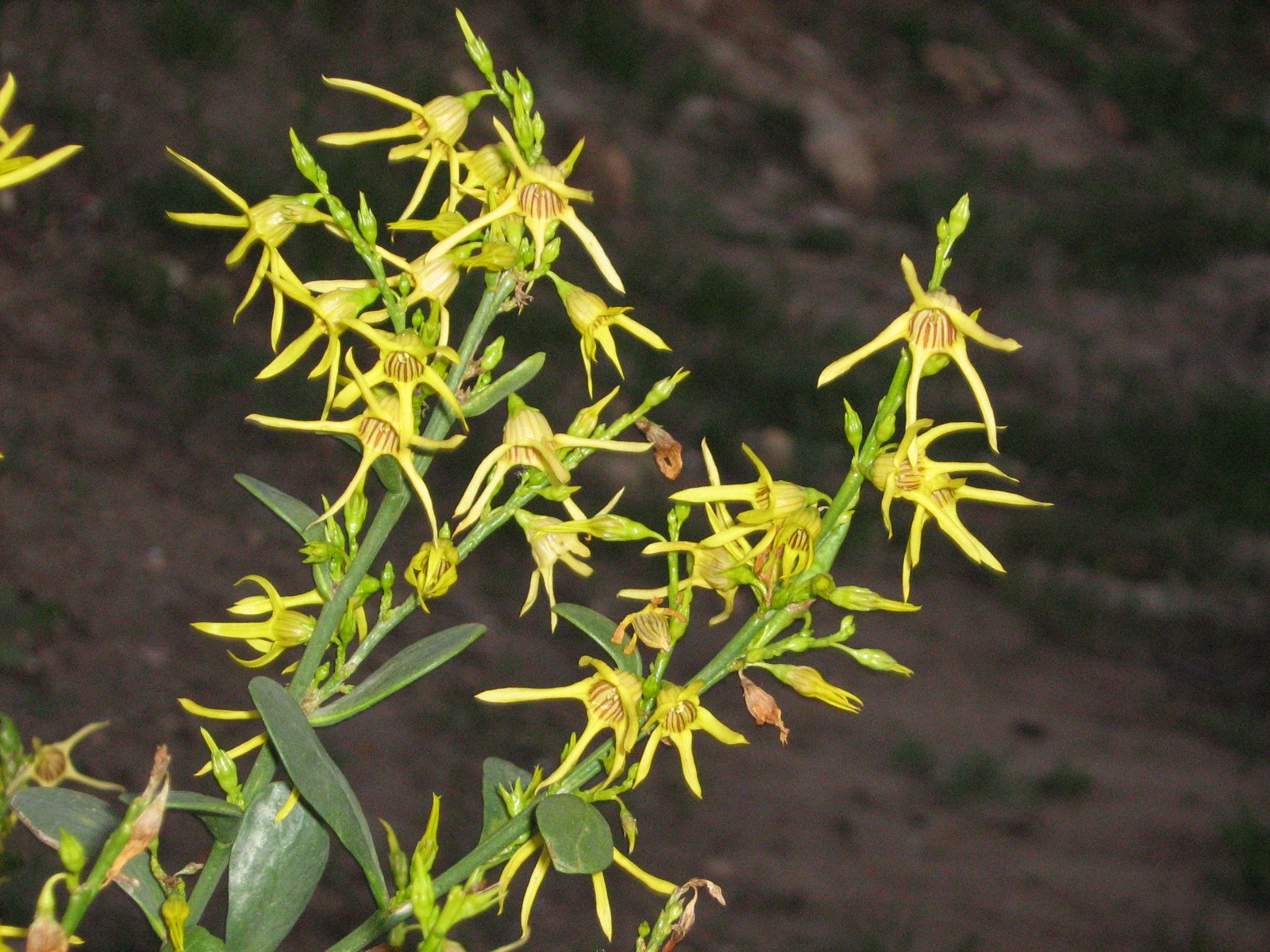
- Anthocercis littorea at Port Denison

Scientific classification
- Kingdom: Plantae
- Clade: Tracheophytes
- Clade: Angiosperms
- Clade: Eudicots
- Clade: Asterids
- Order: Solanales
- Family: Solanaceae
- Genus: Anthocercis
- Species: A. littorea

Binomial name
- Anthocercis littorea Labill.

Synonyms
- Anthocercis glabella Miers

= Anthocercis littorea =

Yellow tailflower

Species of flowering plant

Anthocercis littorea, also known as yellow tailflower, is a species of shrub in the family Solanaceae. It is native to Western Australia where it grows on coastal limestone and dunes as well as sandplains.

== Description ==
It usually grows to between 0.6 and 3 metres in height and produces yellow flowers throughout the year in its native range.

The species was first formally described by French naturalist Jacques Labillardière in 1806 in Novae Hollandiae Plantarum Specimen.
