= Wydler =

Wydler is a surname meaning "woods" or "forest" in Swiss German. Originally from the Zurich area, it can also be found in the United States and Argentina where people have emigrated in the early 20th century.

Notable people with this surname include:

- Heinrich Wydler (1800–1883), a Swiss botanist
- John W. Wydler (1924–1987), an American politician
- Thomas Wydler (1959 - ), a Swiss musician
