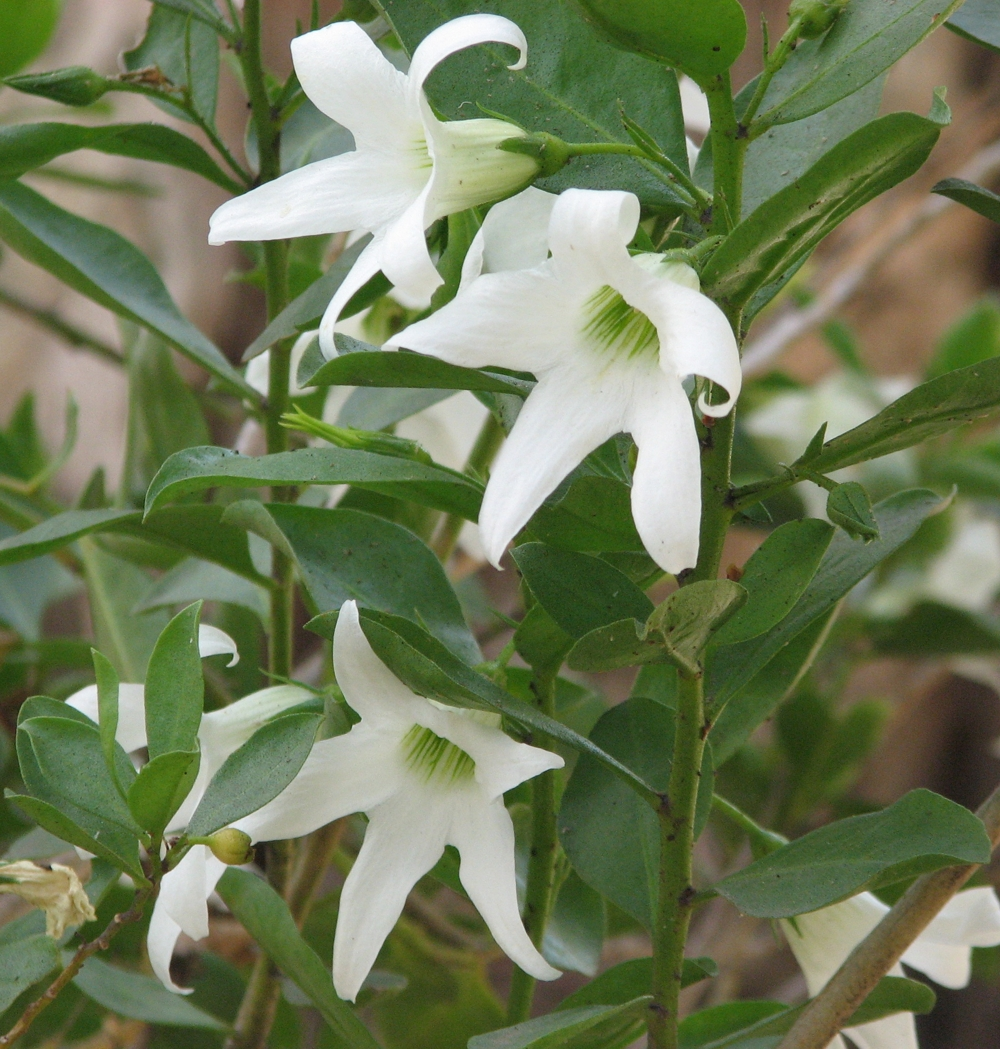

Scientific classification
- Kingdom: Plantae
- Clade: Tracheophytes
- Clade: Angiosperms
- Clade: Eudicots
- Clade: Asterids
- Order: Solanales
- Family: Solanaceae
- Genus: Anthocercis
- Species: A. viscosa

Binomial name
- Anthocercis viscosa R.Br.

= Anthocercis viscosa =

Sticky tailflower

Species of flowering plant

Anthocercis viscosa, also known as sticky tailflower, is a species of shrub in the family Solanaceae, native to the south coast of Western Australia. It grows up to 3 metres in height and produces white or cream flowers between May and February (late autumn to late summer) in its native range.

== Taxonomy ==
The species was first formally described by botanist Robert Brown in 1810 in Prodromus Florae Novae Hollandiae. Two subspecies are currently recognised:

- Anthocercis viscosa subsp. caudata Haegi
- Anthocercis viscosa R.Br. subsp. viscosa
