= Trianaea =

Scientific classification
- Kingdom: Plantae
- Clade: Tracheophytes
- Clade: Angiosperms
- Clade: Eudicots
- Clade: Asterids
- Order: Solanales
- Family: Solanaceae
- Subfamily: Solanoideae
- Tribe: Juanulloeae
- Genus: Trianaea; Planch. & Linden

Species
- See text.

Genus of plants

Trianaea is a genus of the plant family Solanaceae. It occurs in Colombia, Ecuador and Peru. It is placed in the subfamily Solanoideae, tribe Juanulloeae.

== Species ==
As of February 2023, Plants of the World Online accepted three species:

- Trianaea brevipes (Cuatrec.) S.Knapp
- Trianaea naeka S.Knapp
- Trianaea nobilis Planch. & Linden
