= Cataracta =

Scientific classification
- Kingdom: Plantae
- Clade: Tracheophytes
- Clade: Angiosperms
- Clade: Eudicots
- Clade: Asterids
- Order: Solanales
- Family: Solanaceae
- Subfamily: Solanoideae
- Tribe: Physaleae
- Subtribe: Physalinae
- Genus: Cataracta; Zamora-Tav., O.Vargas & M.Martínez (2023)
- Species: C. microphysa

Binomial name
- Cataracta microphysa (A.Gray) Zamora-Tav., O.Vargas & M.Martínez (2023)

Synonyms
- Physalis campanulata Brandegee (1912); Physalis microphysa A.Gray (1886)

Genus of flowering plants

Cataracta microphysa is a species of flowering plant in the nightshade family, Solanaceae. It is the sole species in genus Cataracta. It is a subshrub native to Mexico, ranging from Jalisco to northeastern Mexico.
