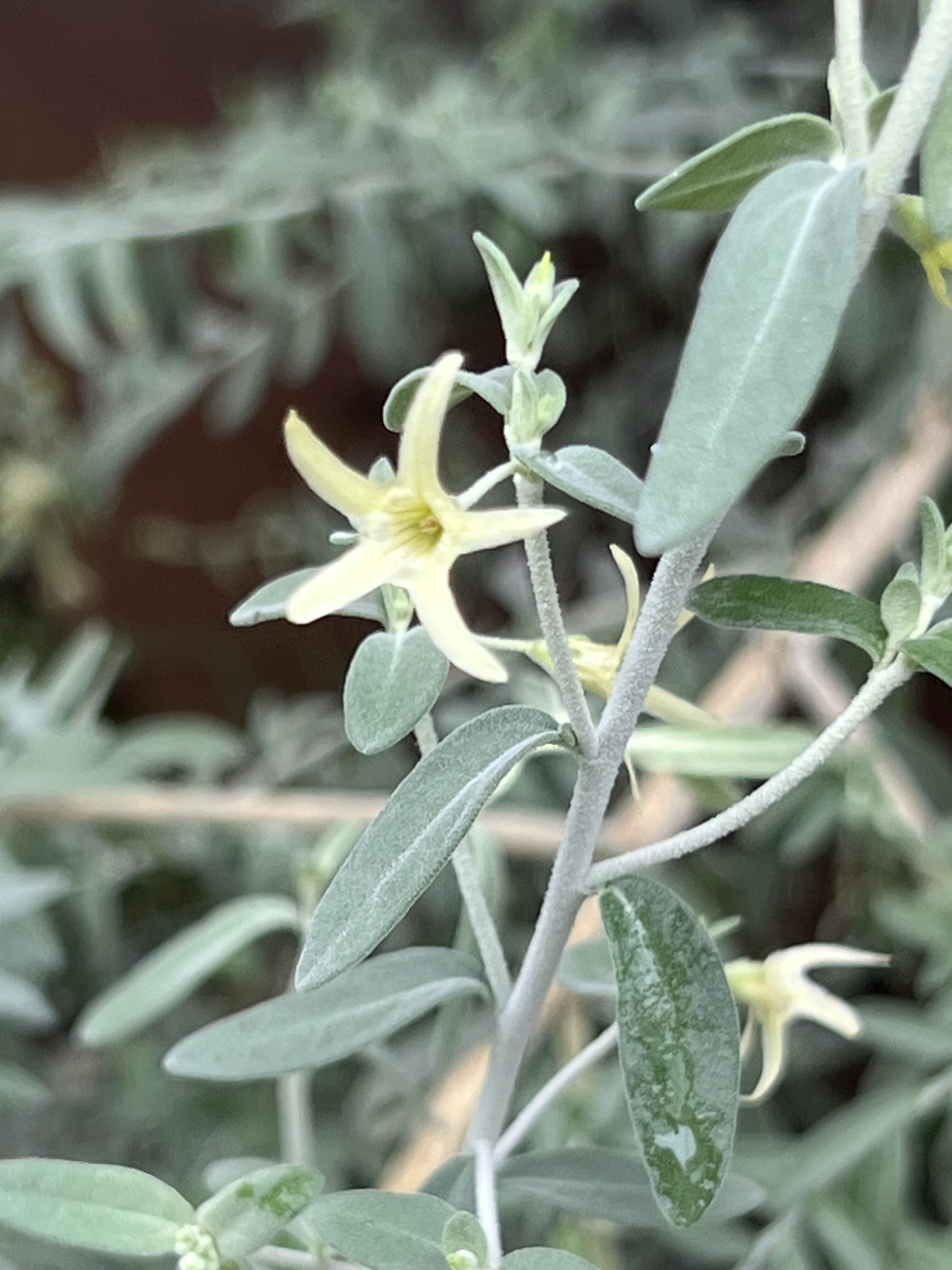

Scientific classification
- Kingdom: Plantae
- Clade: Tracheophytes
- Clade: Angiosperms
- Clade: Eudicots
- Clade: Asterids
- Order: Solanales
- Family: Solanaceae
- Genus: Cyphanthera
- Species: C. albicans

Binomial name
- Cyphanthera albicans (A.Cunn.) Miers

= Cyphanthera albicans =

Grey ray flower

Species of plant

Cyphanthera albicans, commonly known as grey ray flower, is a species of flowering plant in the family Solanaceae and is endemic to south-eastern continental Australia. It is an upright shrub with grey foliage and cream, white or pale yellow flowers.

== Description ==
Cyphanthera albicans is an upright shrub to 3 m (9.8 ft) high, greyish, branches covered densely in short, matted hairs or soft, short hairs. Older leaves are oval to elliptic or more or less egg-shaped, 5–45 mm (0.20–1.77 in) long, 1.5–7 mm (0.059–0.276 in) wide, lamina covered densely in short matted hairs, younger leaves up to 13 cm (5.1 in) long and 4 cm (1.6 in) wide. The corolla is cream or light yellow with purple markings, 6–22 mm (0.24–0.87 in) long, smooth or with soft hairs, lobes oval to squared to nearly linear and 3–5 mm (0.12–0.20 in) long. Flowering occurs from spring to early summer and the fruit a capsule 2.5 mm (0.098 in) long.

== Taxonomy and naming ==
This species was described in 1853 by Allan Cunningham who gave it the name Anthocercis albicans. In 1853 John Miers transferred the species to Cyphanthera as C. albicans in The Annals and Magazine of Natural History. The specific epithet (albicans) means "becoming white" or "whitish".

In 1981, Laurie Haegi described three subspecies of C. albicans in the journal Telopea and the names are accepted by the Australian Plant Census:

- Cyphanthera albicans (A.Cunn.) Miers subsp. albicans has white to creamy-white flowers 6.5–13 mm (0.26–0.51 in) long, leaves mostly 6–15 mm (0.24–0.59 in) long and hairs 0.3–0.8 mm (0.012–0.031 in) long on the branches.
- Cyphanthera albicans subsp. notabilis Haegi has white to creamy-white flowers 13–22 mm (0.51–0.87 in) long, leaves mostly 35 mm (1.4 in) long and 3–6 mm (0.12–0.24 in) wide, and woolly hairs 0.3–0.8 mm (0.012–0.031 in) long on the branches.
- Cyphanthera albicans subsp. tomentosa (Benth.) Haegi (previously known as Anthocercis albicans var. tomentosa) has yellow or pale yellow flowers 8–19 mm (0.31–0.75 in) long, leaves mostly 5–17 mm (0.20–0.67 in) long and hairs less than 0.3 mm (0.012 in) long on the branches.

== Distribution and habitat ==
Cyphanthera albicans subsp. albicans grows in forest or shrubland in New South Wales from near Rylstone to the Shoalhaven River and also occurs in Queensland and the far north-east of Victoria. Subspecies notabilis is restricted to the Warrumbungles and subsp. tomentosa to western New South Wales.
