= Tsoala =

Scientific classification
- Kingdom: Plantae
- Clade: Tracheophytes
- Clade: Angiosperms
- Clade: Eudicots
- Clade: Asterids
- Order: Solanales
- Family: Solanaceae
- Genus: Tsoala; Bosser & D'Arcy

Genus of flowering plants

Tsoala is a genus of flowering plants belonging to the family Solanaceae. It is currently placed (tentatively) in subfamily Goetzeoideae.

Its native range is Madagascar.

Species:

- Tsoala tubiflora Bosser & D'Arcy
