= Doselia =

Scientific classification
- Kingdom: Plantae
- Clade: Tracheophytes
- Clade: Angiosperms
- Clade: Eudicots
- Clade: Asterids
- Order: Solanales
- Family: Solanaceae
- Subfamily: Solanoideae
- Tribe: Solandreae
- Genus: Doselia; A.Orejuela & Särkinen, 2022

Species
- 4, see text

Genus of plants in the nightshade family

Doselia is a genus of hemiepiphytic lianas belonging to the Solandreae tribe of the nightshade family, Solanaceae. The species belonging to this genus are endemic to the premontane forests of the Colombian and Ecuadorian Andes.

== Description ==
The genus was characterized from congeners based on the membranous leaves, the eglandular simple trichomes that are usually sparsely pubescent, pseudo-verticillate leaf arrangement, and the few-flowered inflorescences that are elongated, and pendulous, bearing showy flowers and conical fruits.

== Species ==
- Doselia epifita (S.Knapp) A.Orejuela & Särkinen
- Doselia huilensis (A.Orejuela & J.M.Vélez) A.Orejuela & Särkinen
- Doselia lopezii (Hunz.)A.Orejuela & Särkinen
- Doselia galilensis A.Orejuela & Villanueva

== Etymology ==
The genus name, Doselia, derives from the Spanish word, dosel which means canopy referring to the hemiepiphytic lianescent habit of all species of Doselia, wherein the branches rise high up to the canopy making the species challenging to see unless the plants are bearing their showy pendulous flowers.
