= Trozelia =

Scientific classification
- Kingdom: Plantae
- Clade: Tracheophytes
- Clade: Angiosperms
- Clade: Eudicots
- Clade: Asterids
- Order: Solanales
- Family: Solanaceae
- Genus: Trozelia; Raf.

Synonyms
- Plicula Raf.

Genus of flowering plants

Trozelia is a genus of flowering plants belonging to the family Solanaceae. It is also within the Physalinae (Miers) Hunz. subtribe.

It is native to Ecuador and Peru in western South America.

== Known species ==
According to Kew:

- Trozelia grandiflora (Benth.) J.M.H.Shaw
- Trozelia umbellata (Ruiz & Pav.) Raf.

The genus name of Trozelia is in honour of Clas Blechert Trozelius (1719–1794), a Swedish clergyman and botanist. He was also professor of economics at Lund University. It was first described and published in Sylva Tellur. on page 54 in 1838.
