= Capsicophysalis =

Scientific classification
- Kingdom: Plantae
- Clade: Tracheophytes
- Clade: Angiosperms
- Clade: Eudicots
- Clade: Asterids
- Order: Solanales
- Family: Solanaceae
- Genus: Capsicophysalis (Bitter) Averett & M.Martínez

Genus of flowering plants

Capsicophysalis is a genus of flowering plants belonging to the family Solanaceae.

Its native range is Guatemala, Mexico.

Species:

- Capsicophysalis potosina (B.L.Rob. & Greenm.) Averett & M.Martínez
