= Sclerophylax =

Scientific classification
- Kingdom: Plantae
- Clade: Tracheophytes
- Clade: Angiosperms
- Clade: Eudicots
- Clade: Asterids
- Order: Solanales
- Family: Solanaceae
- Genus: Sclerophylax; Miers (1848)

Species
- 12; see text

Synonyms
- Sterrhymenia Griseb. (1874)

Genus of flowering plants

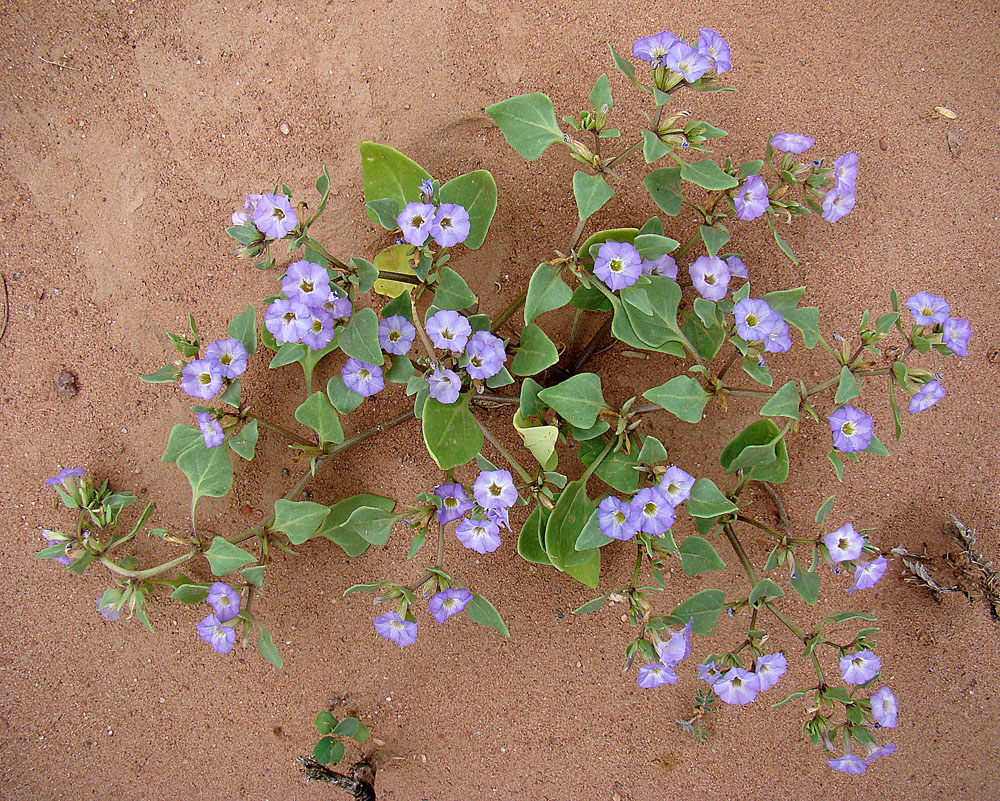
Sclerophylax kurtzii

Sclerophylax is a genus of flowering plants in the nightshade family, Solanaceae. It comprises 12 species native to southern South America, including Paraguay, Uruguay, and northern Argentina.

== Species ==
12 species are accepted.

- Sclerophylax adnatifolius Di Fulvio
- Sclerophylax arnottii Miers
- Sclerophylax caducifructus Di Fulvio
- Sclerophylax cocuccii Di Fulvio
- Sclerophylax cuyanus Di Fulvio
- Sclerophylax difulvioi Del Vitto & Peten.
- Sclerophylax hunzikeri Di Fulvio
- Sclerophylax kurtzii Di Fulvio
- Sclerophylax ruiz-lealii Di Fulvio
- Sclerophylax spinescens Miers
- Sclerophylax tenuicaulis Di Fulvio
- Sclerophylax trispermus Di Fulvio
