= Coeloneurum =

Scientific classification
- Kingdom: Plantae
- Clade: Tracheophytes
- Clade: Angiosperms
- Clade: Eudicots
- Clade: Asterids
- Order: Solanales
- Family: Solanaceae
- Genus: Coeloneurum; Radlk. (1889)
- Species: C. ferrugineum

Binomial name
- Coeloneurum ferrugineum (Spreng.) Urb. (1899)

Synonyms
- Coeloneurum eggersii Radlk. (1889); Coeloneurum lineare Radlk. (1889); Jacquinia ferruginea Spreng. (1824)

Genus of flowering plants

Coeloneurum is a genus of flowering plants belonging to the family Solanaceae. It contains a single species, Coeloneurum ferrugineum, a shrub or tree endemic to Hispaniola.
