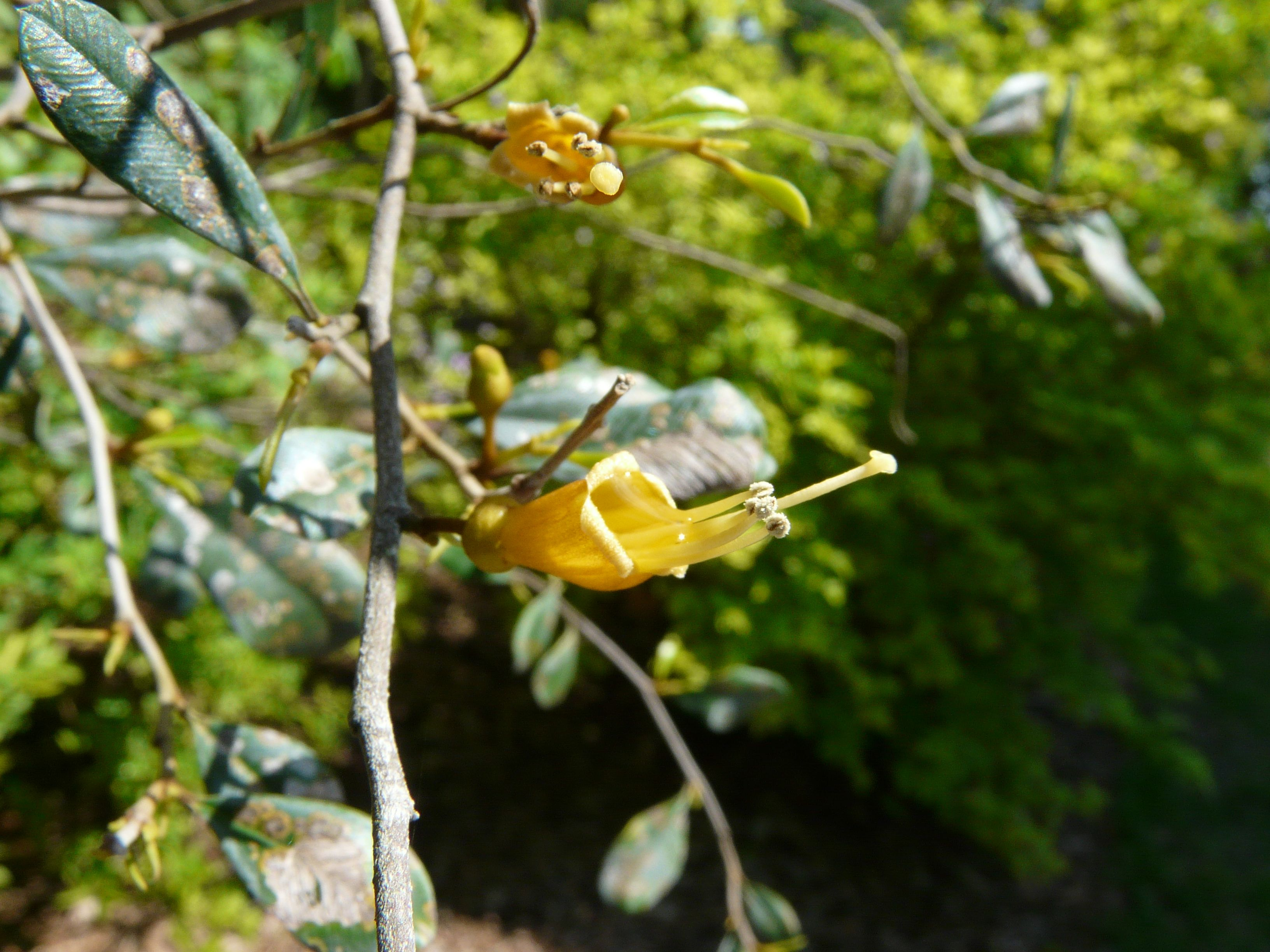
- Espadaea Amoena

Scientific classification
- Kingdom: Plantae
- Clade: Tracheophytes
- Clade: Angiosperms
- Clade: Eudicots
- Clade: Asterids
- Order: Solanales
- Family: Solanaceae
- Genus: Espadaea; A.Rich.
- Species: E. amoena

Binomial name
- Espadaea amoena A.Rich.

Synonyms
- Armeniastrum apiculatum Lem.; Espadaea amoena var. nejasaensis Kitan.; Espadaea apiculata (Lem.) Miers; Goetzea amoena (A.Rich.) Griseb.

= Espadaea =

Genus of plants

Espadaea is a monotypic genus of flowering plants belonging to the family Solanaceae. The only species is Espadaea amoena.

It is native to Cuba.

The genus name is in honour of Juan José Díaz de Espada (1757–1832), a Spanish bishop in Havana in Cuba, and the Latin epithet of amoena means "beautiful" or "pleasing". It was first described and published in R.de la Sagra, Hist. Fis. Cuba, Bot. Vol.11 on page 148 in 1850.
