= Heteranthia =

Scientific classification
- Kingdom: Plantae
- Clade: Tracheophytes
- Clade: Angiosperms
- Clade: Eudicots
- Clade: Asterids
- Order: Solanales
- Family: Solanaceae
- Genus: Heteranthia; Nees & Mart. (1823)
- Species: H. decipiens

Binomial name
- Heteranthia decipiens Nees & Mart. (1823)

Synonyms
- Vrolikia Spreng. (1826); Vrolikia polygaloides Spreng. (1826)

Genus of plants

Heteranthia is a monotypic genus of flowering plants belonging to the family Solanaceae. The only species is Heteranthia decipiens. It is a subshrub native to eastern Brazil.
