= Tuberowithania =

Scientific classification
- Kingdom: Plantae
- Clade: Embryophytes
- Clade: Tracheophytes
- Clade: Spermatophytes
- Clade: Angiosperms
- Clade: Eudicots
- Clade: Asterids
- Order: Solanales
- Family: Solanaceae
- Tribe: Physaleae
- Subtribe: Withaninae
- Genus: Tuberowithania; Ze H.Wang & Yi Yang
- Species: T. pengiana

Binomial name
- Tuberowithania pengiana Ze H.Wang & Yi Yang

Genus of flowering plants

Tuberowithania is a genus of flowering plants in the family Solanaceae. It includes a single species, Tuberowithania pengiana, which is endemic to Yunnan in south-central China. The species is known only from Shuangjiang County in southwestern Yunnan.
