= Protoschwenkia =

Scientific classification
- Kingdom: Plantae
- Clade: Tracheophytes
- Clade: Angiosperms
- Clade: Eudicots
- Clade: Asterids
- Order: Solanales
- Family: Solanaceae
- Genus: Protoschwenkia; Soler. (1898)
- Species: P. mandonii

Binomial name
- Protoschwenkia mandonii Soler. (1898)

Synonyms
- Schwenkiopsis Dammer (1916); Schwenckia mandonii (Soler.) Rusby (1907); Schwenkiopsis herzogii Dammer (1916)

Genus of flowering plants

Protoschwenkia mandonii is a species of flowering plant in the nightshade family, Solanaceae. It is the sole species in genus Protoschwenkia. It is a subshrub native to Bolivia.
