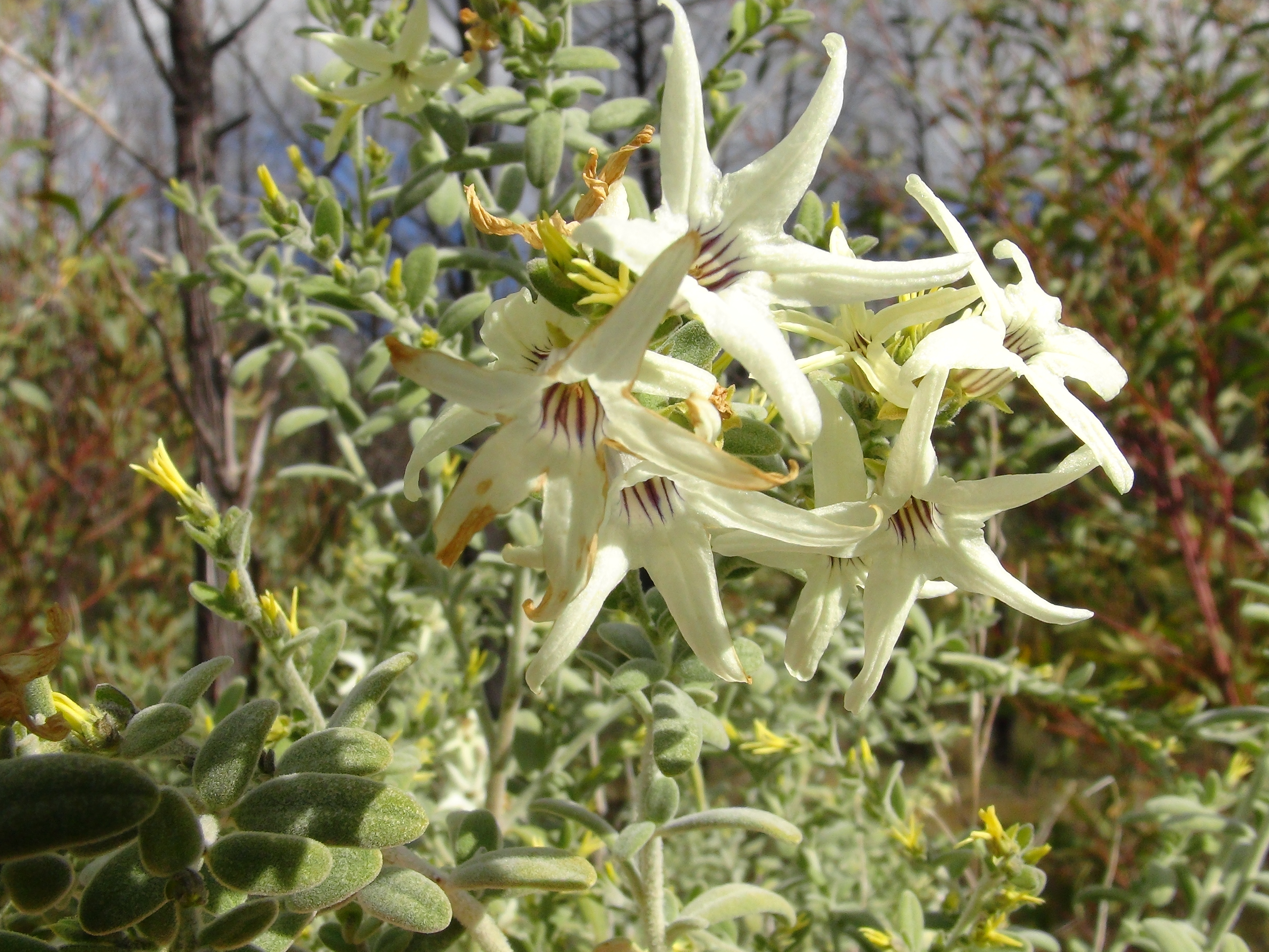
- Cyphanthera albicans

Scientific classification
- Kingdom: Plantae
- Clade: Tracheophytes
- Clade: Angiosperms
- Clade: Eudicots
- Clade: Asterids
- Order: Solanales
- Family: Solanaceae
- Subfamily: Nicotianoideae
- Tribe: Anthocercideae
- Genus: Cyphanthera; Miers

Species
- See text

Synonyms
- Heterotypic Synonyms: Eadesia F.Muell.

= Cyphanthera =

Genus of flowering plants

Cyphanthera is a genus of flowering plants in the family Solanaceae. The genus is endemic to Australia.

== Taxonomy ==
The genus Cyphanthera was first formally described in 1853 by John Miers in Journal of Natural History. The genus name means "bent anther".

== Species list ==
Accepted species include:

- Cyphanthera albicans (A.Cunn.) Miers
  - Cyphanthera albicans (A.Cunn.) Miers subsp. albicans
  - Cyphanthera albicans subsp. notabilis Haegi
  - Cyphanthera albicans subsp. tomentosa (Benth.) Haegi
- Cyphanthera anthocercidea (F.Muell.) Haegi
  - Cyphanthera × cuneata Miers
  - Cyphanthera × frondosa Miers
- Cyphanthera microphylla Miers
- Cyphanthera miersiana Haegi
- Cyphanthera myosotidea (F.Muell.) Haegi
  - Cyphanthera myosotidea (F.Muell.) Haegi × Grammosolen dixonii (F.Muell. & Tate) Haegi
- Cyphanthera racemosa (F.Muell.) Haegi
- Cyphanthera scabrella (Benth.) Miers
- Cyphanthera tasmanica Miers
