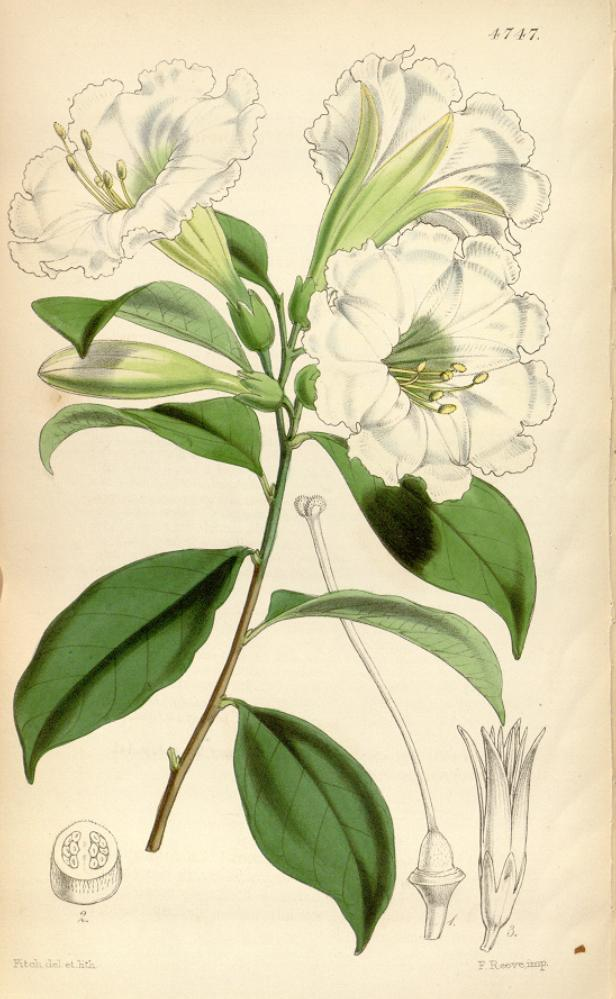
- Illustration of Metternichia principis from Curtis's Botanical Magazine vol. 79 in 1853

Scientific classification
- Kingdom: Plantae
- Clade: Tracheophytes
- Clade: Angiosperms
- Clade: Eudicots
- Clade: Asterids
- Order: Solanales
- Family: Solanaceae
- Genus: Metternichia; J.C.Mikan
- Species: M. principis

Binomial name
- Metternichia principis J.C.Mikan

= Metternichia =

Species of flowering plant

Metternichia is a genus of flowering plants belonging to the family Solanaceae. For a long time the only species was Metternichia principis J.C.Mikan., but recently a second species, M. macrocalyx (Carvalho) L.S.de Souza was recognised.

It is native to eastern Brazil.

The genus name of Metternichia is in honour of Klemens von Metternich (1773–1859), prince of Ochsenhausen, diplomat and Austrian painter and illustrator. The Latin specific epithet of principis is derived from princeps meaning foremost, but in this case refers to belonging to the prince. Both the genus and species were first described and published by Johann Christian Mikan in Del. Fl. Faun. Bras. on table 13 in 1823. from material collected near Sao Paulo and Copa Cabana. The second species occurs in drier habitat and was described by Carvalho in Solanaceae: Biol. & Syst. 12 (1986).
