= Merinthopodium =

Scientific classification
- Kingdom: Plantae
- Clade: Tracheophytes
- Clade: Angiosperms
- Clade: Eudicots
- Clade: Asterids
- Order: Solanales
- Family: Solanaceae
- Genus: Merinthopodium; Donn.Sm.

Genus of plants

Merinthopodium is a genus of flowering plants belonging to the family Solanaceae.

Its native range is Central America to Venezuela.

Species:

- Merinthopodium neuranthum Donn.Sm.
- Merinthopodium pendulum (Cuatrec.) Hunz.
- Merinthopodium vogelii (Cuatrec.) Castillo & R.E.Schult.
