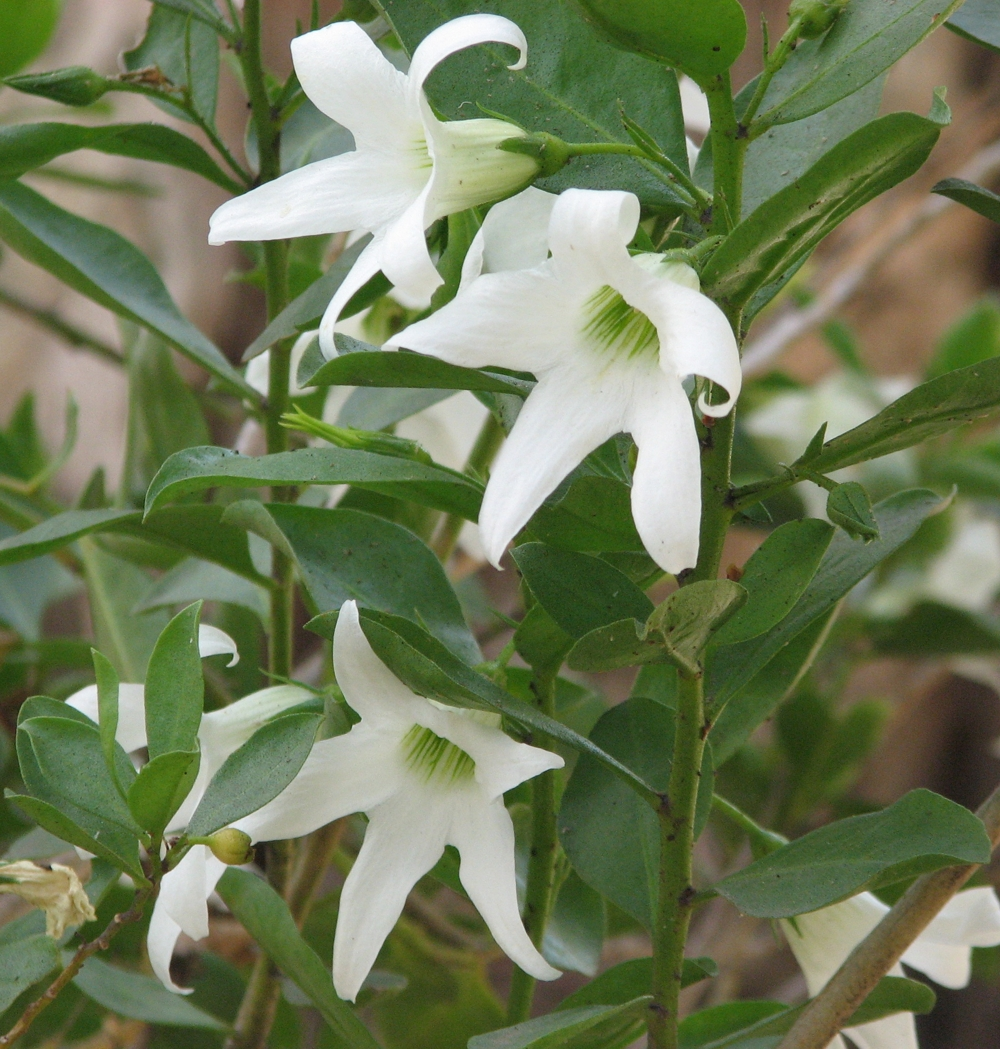
- Anthocercis viscosa

Scientific classification
- Kingdom: Plantae
- Clade: Tracheophytes
- Clade: Angiosperms
- Clade: Eudicots
- Clade: Asterids
- Order: Solanales
- Family: Solanaceae
- Subfamily: Nicotianoideae
- Tribe: Anthocercideae
- Genus: Anthocercis; Labill.

Species
- See text

= Anthocercis =

Genus of flowering plants

Anthocercis, commonly known as tailflower, is a genus of shrubs which are endemic to southern temperate Australia with the center of distribution in the South West Botanical Province of Western Australia. All species of Anthocercis contain tropane alkaloids, and have occasionally caused poisoning in children or been suspected of poisoning stock. Anthocercis is known as the only Solanaceous plant known to produce resin compounds on glandular trichomes.

== Taxonomy ==
The genus, which is placed within the family Solanaceae, was first formally described by botanist Jacques Labillardière in Novae Hollandiae Plantarum Specimen, Vol. 2: 19 (1806). The type species of the genus is Anthocercis littorea Labill.

Anthocercis lies in the subfamily Nicotianoideae. The genus is considered to be part of the tribe "Anthocercideae," but the monophyly of this grouping has been called into question. The species within Anthocercis, however, form a monophyletic group, and lie sister to all other genera of the "Anthocercidoid clade.".

== Etymology ==
Anthocercis; from the Greek anthos (a flower) and kerkis (a ray), in reference to the narrow corolla-lobes.

== Species ==
- Anthocercis angustifolia F.Muell.
- Anthocercis anisantha Endl.
- Anthocercis aromatica C.A.Gardner
- Anthocercis fasciculata F.Muell.
- Anthocercis genistoides Miers
- Anthocercis gracilis Benth. — Slender tailflower
- Anthocercis ilicifolia Hook. — Red striped yellow tailflower
- Anthocercis intricata F.Muell.
- Anthocercis littorea Labill. — Yellow tailflower
- Anthocercis sylvicola T. D. Macfarl. & Ward.-Johnson
- Anthocercis viscosa R.Br. — Sticky tailflower

=== Hybrids ===
- Anthocercis tenuipes Gand. (putative hybrid between Duboisia myoporoides R.Br. & Cyphanthera scabrella (Benth.) Miers)

=== Renamed ===
- Anthocercis microphylla F.Muell. → Cyphanthera microphylla Miers — Small-leaved anthocercis
- Anthocercis odgersii F.Muell. → Cyphanthera odgersii F.Muell. — Woolly anthocercis
- Anthocercis racemosa F.Muell. → Cyphanthera racemosa (F. Muell.) Haegi
