= Melananthus =

Scientific classification
- Kingdom: Plantae
- Clade: Tracheophytes
- Clade: Angiosperms
- Clade: Eudicots
- Clade: Asterids
- Order: Solanales
- Family: Solanaceae
- Genus: Melananthus; Walp.

Genus of plants

Melananthus is a genus of flowering plants belonging to the family Solanaceae.

Its native range is Southern Mexico to Tropical America.

Species:

- Melananthus cubensis Urb.
- Melananthus fasciculatus (Benth.) Soler.
- Melananthus guatemalensis (Benth. ex Hemsl.) Soler.
- Melananthus multiflorus Carvalho
- Melananthus ulei Carvalho
