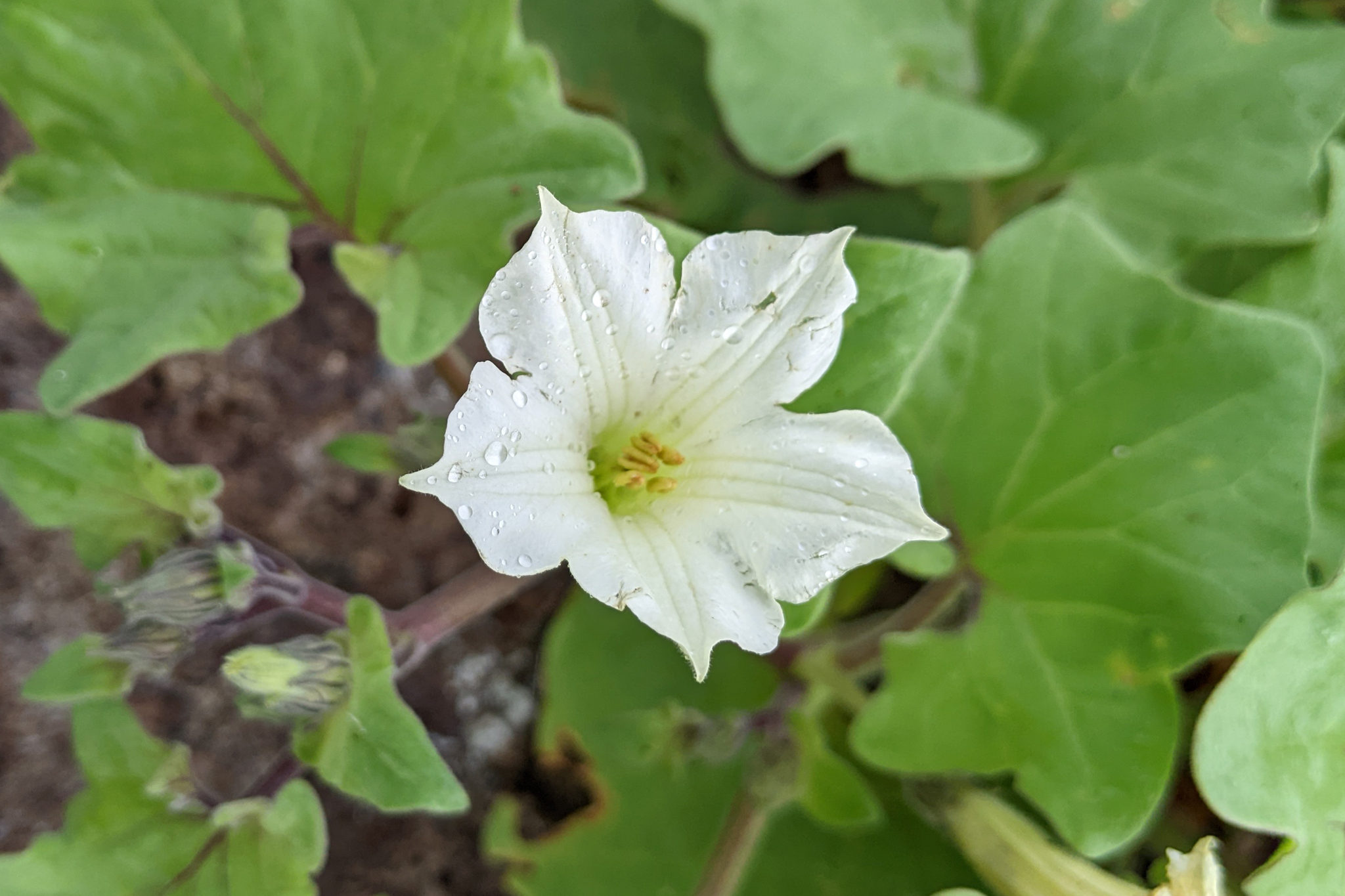
- Exodeconus miersii in the Galápagos Islands

Scientific classification
- Kingdom: Plantae
- Clade: Embryophytes
- Clade: Tracheophytes
- Clade: Spermatophytes
- Clade: Angiosperms
- Clade: Eudicots
- Clade: Asterids
- Order: Solanales
- Family: Solanaceae
- Genus: Exodeconus; Raf.

Synonyms
- Cacabus Bernh.; Dictyocalyx Hook.f.; Streptostigma Regel; Thinogeton Benth.

= Exodeconus =

Genus of plants

Exodeconus is a genus of flowering plants belonging to the family Solanaceae. Its native range is western and southern South America.

Species:

- Exodeconus flavus (I.M.Johnst.) Axelius & D'Arcy
- Exodeconus integrifolius (Phil.) Axelius
- Exodeconus maritimus (Benth.) D'Arcy
- Exodeconus miersii (Hook.f.) D'Arcy
- Exodeconus prostratus (Dombey ex L'Hér.) Raf.
- Exodeconus pusillus (Bitter) Axelius
