= Duckeodendron =

Scientific classification
- Kingdom: Plantae
- Clade: Embryophytes
- Clade: Tracheophytes
- Clade: Spermatophytes
- Clade: Angiosperms
- Clade: Eudicots
- Clade: Asterids
- Order: Solanales
- Family: Solanaceae
- Genus: Duckeodendron; Kuhlm. (1925)
- Species: D. cestroides

Binomial name
- Duckeodendron cestroides Kuhlm.

Genus of trees

Duckeodendron is a genus of flowering plant in the family Solanaceae represented by a single species, Duckeodendron cestroides. A tree reaching 15 to 30 m (49 to 98 ft), it is found in the Amazon rainforest of Brazil. Its common names include pincel-de-macaco and pupunharana. João Geraldo Kuhlmann described it in 1925 and named it for the collector, Adolpho Ducke.

== Taxonomy ==
It seems to be basal within Solanaceae and has not been assigned to any existing subfamily.
