= Ectozoma =

Scientific classification
- Kingdom: Plantae
- Clade: Tracheophytes
- Clade: Angiosperms
- Clade: Eudicots
- Clade: Asterids
- Order: Solanales
- Family: Solanaceae
- Subfamily: Solanoideae
- Tribe: Solandreae
- Genus: Ectozoma; Miers
- Species: E. pavonii

Binomial name
- Ectozoma pavonii Miers

Synonyms
- Homotypic Synonyms: Juanulloa pavonii (Miers) Wettst.; Markea pavonii (Miers) D'Arcy; Heterotypic Synonyms: Salpichroa cuspidata Dunal

Genus of flowering plants

Ectozoma is a genus of flowering plants in the family Solanaceae. It includes a single species, Ectozoma pavonii, a liana native to Ecuador and northern and central Peru.
