= Markea =

Scientific classification
- Kingdom: Plantae
- Clade: Tracheophytes
- Clade: Angiosperms
- Clade: Eudicots
- Clade: Asterids
- Order: Solanales
- Family: Solanaceae
- Subfamily: Solanoideae
- Tribe: Juanulloeae
- Genus: Markea; Rich.

Synonyms
- Lamarckia Vahl; Ectozoma Miers

Genus of flowering plants

Markea is a genus of plant in family Solanaceae.

== Species ==
This genus includes the following species:

- Markea antioquiensis S.Knapp
- Markea campanulata (Donn.Sm.) Lundell
- Markea coccinea Rich.
- Markea formicarum Dammer
- Markea fosbergii Hunz.
- Markea harlingiana Hunz.
- Markea hunzikeri A.Orejuela & C.I.Orozco
- Markea klugii (Hunz.) Molinari
- Markea longiflora Miers
- Markea pavonii (Miers) D'Arcy
- Markea pilosa S.Knapp
- Markea plowmanii Hunz.
- Markea purpurea A.Orejuela & C.I.Orozco
- Markea sessiliflora Ducke
- Markea spruceana Hunz.
- Markea sturmii Cuatrec.
- Markea tomentosa Lundell
- Markea vasquezii E.Rodr.
