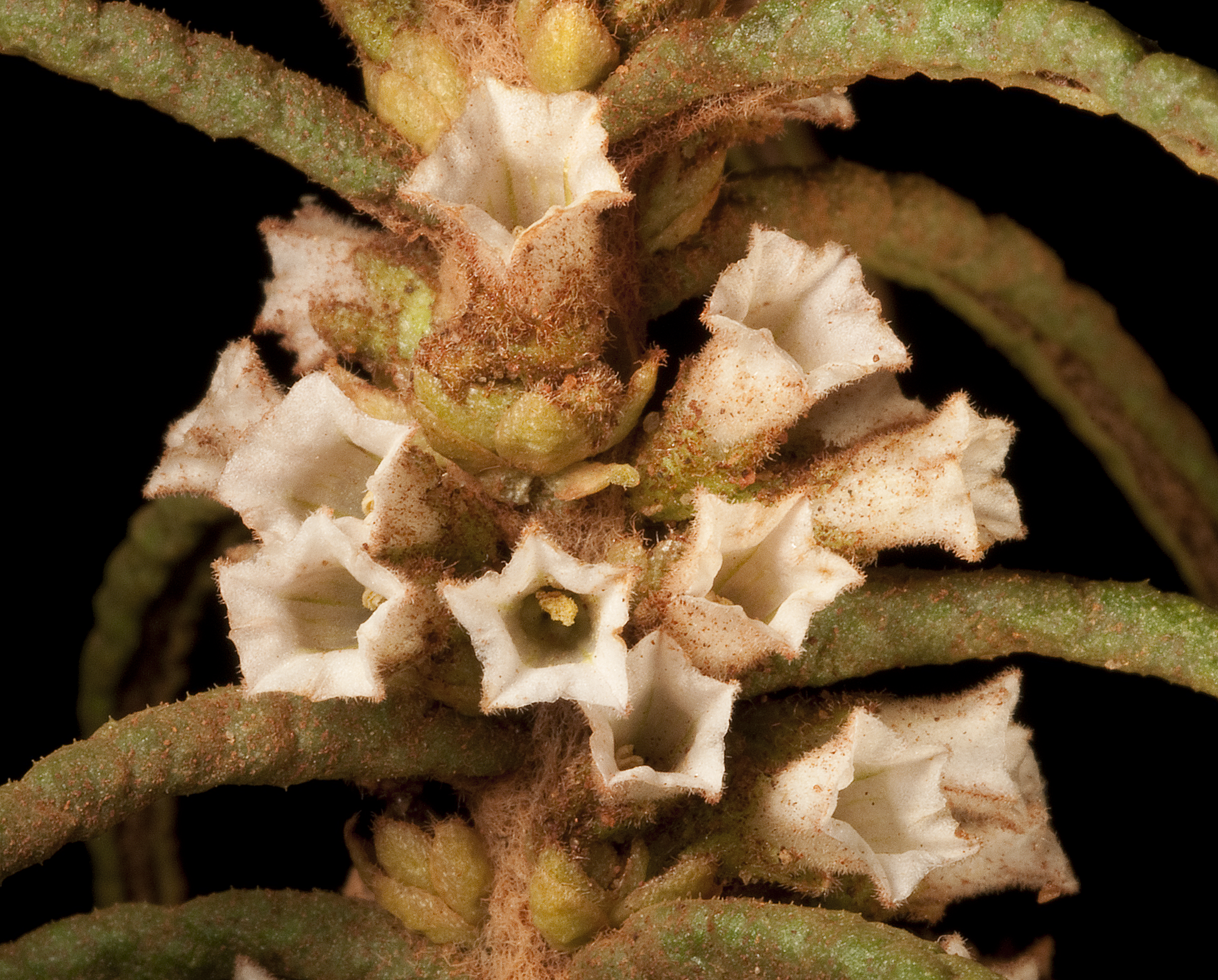
- Symonanthus aromaticus

Scientific classification
- Kingdom: Plantae
- Clade: Tracheophytes
- Clade: Angiosperms
- Clade: Eudicots
- Clade: Asterids
- Order: Solanales
- Family: Solanaceae
- Genus: Symonanthus; Haegi

Synonyms
- Isandra F.Muell. in S. Sci. Rec. 3: 2 (1883), nom. illeg. Isandraea Rauschert Taxon 31: 562 (1982)

= Symonanthus =

Genus of flowering plants

Symonanthus is a genus of flowering plants belonging to the family Solanaceae. The genus was circumscribed by Laurence Arnold Robert Haegi in Telopea vol.2 on page 175 in 1981.

The genus name of Symonanthus is in honour of David Eric Symon (1920–2011), who was an Australian botanist and taxonomist, from the University of Adelaide and Waite Agricultural Research Institute. He help develop the Waite Arboretum as well.

== Species ==
As accepted by Kew:

- Symonanthus aromaticus (C.A.Gardner) Haegi
- Symonanthus bancroftii (F.Muell.) Haegi
