= Grammosolen =

Scientific classification
- Kingdom: Plantae
- Clade: Tracheophytes
- Clade: Angiosperms
- Clade: Eudicots
- Clade: Asterids
- Order: Solanales
- Family: Solanaceae
- Genus: Grammosolen; Haegi

Genus of plants

Grammosolen is a genus of flowering plants belonging to the family Solanaceae.

Its native range is South Australia.

Species:

- Grammosolen dixonii (F.Muell. & Tate) Haegi
- Grammosolen truncatus (Ising) Haegi
