= Crenidium =

Scientific classification
- Kingdom: Plantae
- Clade: Tracheophytes
- Clade: Angiosperms
- Clade: Eudicots
- Clade: Asterids
- Order: Solanales
- Family: Solanaceae
- Genus: Crenidium; Haegi

Genus of flowering plants

Crenidium is a genus of flowering plants belonging to the family Solanaceae.

Its native range is Western Australia.

Species:

- Crenidium spinescens Haegi
