= Heinrich Wydler =

Swiss botanist

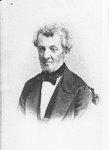
Heinrich Wydler 1800–1883

Heinrich Wydler was a Swiss botanist (24 April 1800 in Zurich – 6 December 1883 in Gernsbach.) He spent the years 1826–27 on a collecting expedition to the West Indies; worked at the St. Petersburg botanical garden in 1828-30; was curator (keeper) of the de Candolle botanical collections at the University of Geneva (G-DeC), 1830–4. He worked as a teacher in Geneva and Bern and after his marriage in 1840 settled in Strasbourg.

The now defunct genus Wydleria DC. (Apiaceae) was named in his honor.

== Complete bibliography ==
- WorldCat

== Sources ==
- Nordisk Familjebok
- Allgemeine deutsche Biographie
- Urban, Ignaz, Notae Biographicae, Symbolae Antillanae 3:146,1902.
