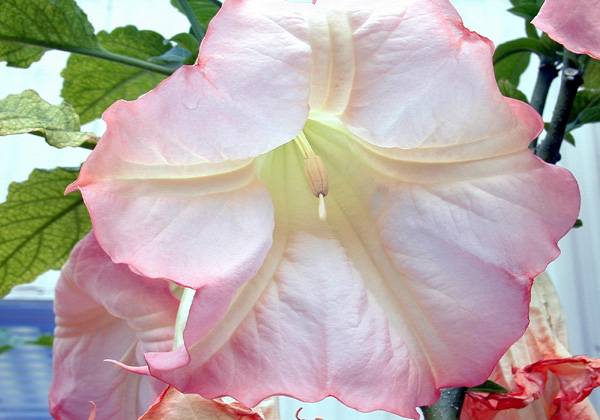
- A flowering Brugmansia suaveolens from the US Botanic Garden

Scientific classification
- Kingdom: Plantae
- Clade: Tracheophytes
- Clade: Angiosperms
- Clade: Eudicots
- Clade: Asterids
- Order: Solanales
- Family: Solanaceae; Juss.

Type genus
- Solanum L.

Subfamilies
- Cestroideae; Duckeodenroideae; Goetzeoideae; Nicotianoideae; Petunioideae; Schizanthoideae; Schwenckioideae; Solanoideae

Synonyms
- Duckeodendraceae

= Solanaceae =

Solanaceae Temporal range: Early Eocene to Recent, 52–0 Ma Cretaceous origin based on molecular clock estimates

Family of flowering plants

Solanaceae (/ˌsɒləˈneɪsi.iː, -ˌaɪ/), commonly known as the nightshades, is a family of flowering plants in the order Solanales. The family contains approximately 2,700 species, several of which are used as agricultural crops, medicinal plants, and ornamental plants. Many members of the family have high alkaloid contents, making some highly toxic, but many—such as tomatoes, potatoes, eggplants and peppers—are commonly used in food around the world.

Originating in South America, Solanaceae now inhabit every continent on Earth except Antarctica. After the K–Pg extinction event they rapidly diversified and have adapted to live in deserts, tundras, rainforests, plains, and highlands, and taken on wide range of forms including trees, vines, shrubs, and epiphytes. Nearly 80% of all nightshades are included in the subfamily Solanoideae, most of which are members of the type genus Solanum. Most taxonomists recognize six other subfamilies: Cestroideae, Goetzeoideae, Nicotianoideae, Petunioideae, Schizanthoideae, and Schwenkioideae, although nightshade taxonomy is still controversial. The genus Duckeodendron is sometimes placed in its own subfamily, Duckeodendroideae.

The high alkaloid content in some species has made them valuable for recreational, medicinal, and culinary use. The tobacco plant has been used for centuries as a recreational drug because of its high nicotine content. The tropanes in Atropa bella-donna can have pain-killing, relaxing, or psychedelic effects, making it a popular plant in alternative medicine, as well as one of the most toxic plants in the world. The presence of capsaicin in Capsicum species gives their fruits their signature pungency, which are used to make most spicy food products sold today.

Other nightshades are known for their beauty, such as the long, slender flowers of Brugmansia, the various colors of Petunia, or the spotted and speckled varieties of Schizanthus.

== Etymology ==
The name "Solanaceae" comes from Solanum, the type genus of the family, + -aceae, the suffix for plant family names. The etymology of the word solanum is unclear. The name probably comes from a perceived resemblance of certain species' flowers to the sun (sol in Latin) and its rays. At least one species of Solanum is known as the "sunberry". Alternatively, the name could originate from the Latin verb solare, meaning "to soothe", presumably referring to the soothing pharmacological properties of some of the psychoactive species of the family.

The common name "nightshade" developed directly from Middle English nyght-shade, originating from the Old English word nihtscada (lit. "shade of night"), cognate with Germanic words such as German nachtschatten and Dutch nachtschade. The reason for these names is unknown, but could have been a reference to the appearance of the fruits.

== Description ==
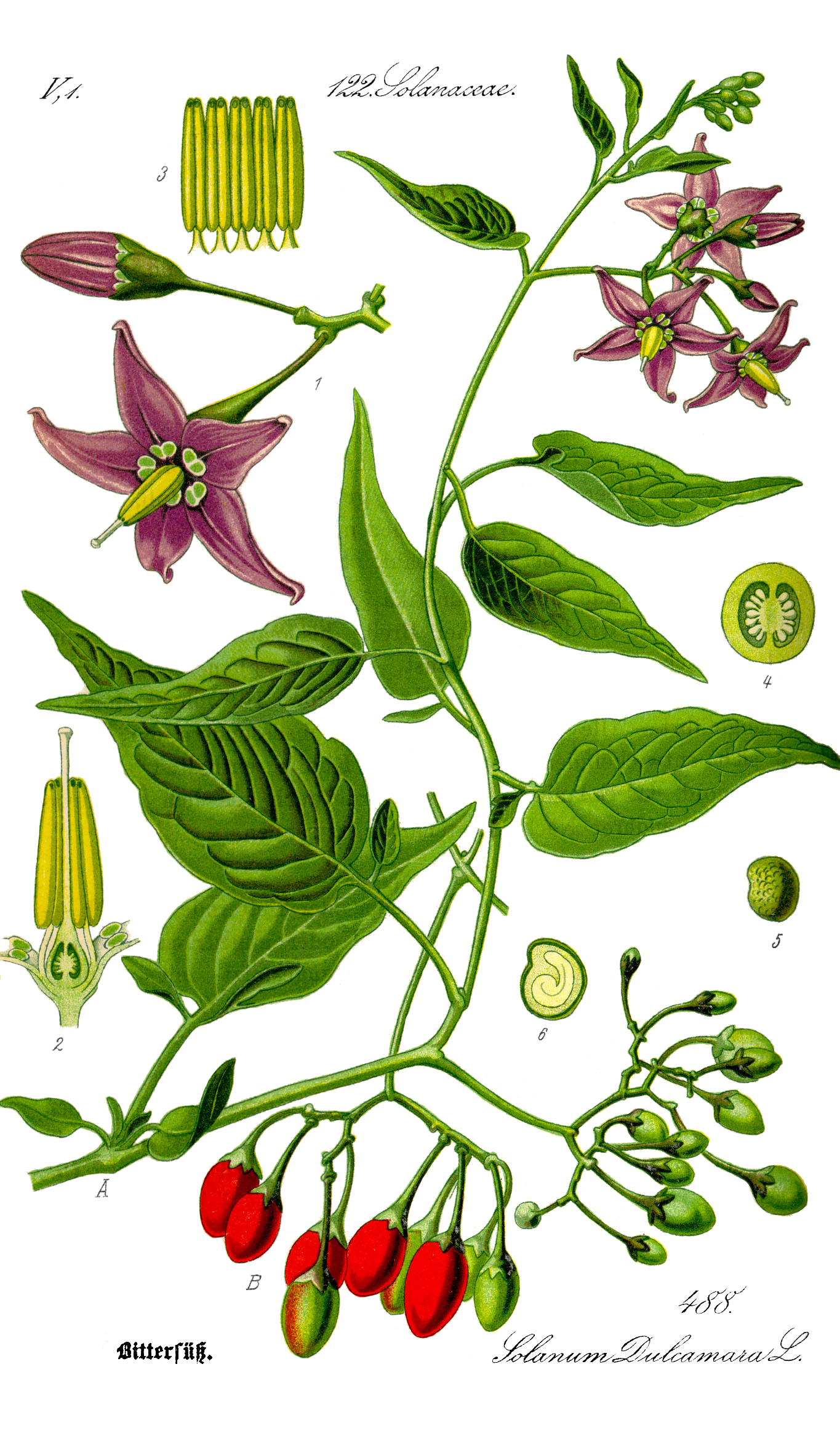
Illustration of Solanum dulcamara. 1. flower; 2. flower in longitudinal section, without the petals; 3. androecium; 4. ovary, in transverse section; 5. seed viewed from above; 6. seed in transverse section – note the curved embryo surrounding the endosperm; A. branch with leaves and flowers; B. stem with immature and mature fruit

Nightshades can take the form of herbs, shrubs, trees, vines and lianas, and sometimes epiphytes. They can be annuals, biennials, or perennials, upright or decumbent. Some have subterranean tubers. They do not have laticifers, nor latex, nor coloured saps. They can have a basal or terminal group of leaves or neither of these types. The leaves are generally alternate or alternate to opposed (that is, alternate at the base of the plant and opposed towards the inflorescence). The leaves can be herbaceous, leathery, or transformed into spines. The leaves are generally petiolate or subsessile, rarely sessile. They are frequently inodorous, but some are aromatic or fetid. The foliar lamina can be either simple or compound, and the latter can be either pinnatifid or ternate. The leaves have reticulated venation and lack a basal meristem. The laminae are generally dorsiventral and lack secretory cavities. The stomata are generally confined to one of a leaf's two sides; they are rarely found on both sides.

Floral diagram of the potato (Solanum tuberosum), Legend: 1 = sepals 2 = petals 3 = stamens 4 = superior ovary

The flowers are generally hermaphrodites, although some are monoecious, andromonoecious, or dioecious species (such as some Solanum or Symonanthus). They are most commonly pollinated by insects. The flowers can be solitary or grouped into terminal, cymose, or axillary inflorescences. The flowers are medium-sized, fragrant (Nicotiana), fetid (Anthocercis), or inodorous. The flowers are usually actinomorphic, slightly zygomorphic, or markedly zygomorphic (for example, in flowers with a bilabial corolla in Schizanthus species). The irregularities in symmetry can be due to the androecium, to the perianth, or both at the same time. In the great majority of species, the flowers have a differentiated perianth with a calyx and corolla (with five sepals and five petals, respectively) an androecium with five stamens and two carpels forming a gynoecium with a superior ovary (they are therefore referred to as pentamers and tetracyclic). The stamens are epipetalous and are typically present in multiples of four or five, most commonly four or eight. They usually have a hypogynous disk. The calyx is gamosepalous (as the sepals are joined forming a tube), with the (4)5(6) segments equal, it has five lobes, with the lobes shorter than the tube, it is persistent and often accrescent. The corolla usually has five petals that are also joined forming a tube. Flower shapes are typically rotate (wheel-shaped, spreading in one plane, with a short tube) or tubular (elongated cylindrical tube), campanulated, or funnel-shaped.

The androecium has (2)(4)5(6) free stamens within its opposite sepals (they alternate with the petals). They are usually fertile or, in some cases (for example in Salpiglossideae) they have staminodes. In the latter case, there is usually either one staminode (Salpiglossis) or three (Schizanthus). The anthers touch on their upper end forming a ring, or they are completely free, dorsifixed, or basifixed with poricide dehiscence or through small longitudinal cracks. The stamen's filament can be filiform or flat. The stamens can be inserted inside the coralline tube or exserted. The plants demonstrate simultaneous microsporogenesis, the microspores are tetrad, tetrahedral, or isobilateral. The pollen grains are bicellular at the moment of dehiscence, usually open and angular.

The gynoecium is bicarpelar (rarely three- or five-locular) with a superior ovary and two locules, which may be secondarily divided by false septa, as is the case for Nicandreae and Datureae. The gynoecium is located in an oblique position relative to the flower's median plane. They have one style and one stigma; the latter is simple or bilobate. Each locule has one to 50 ovules that are anatropous or hemianatropous with axillar placentation. The development of the embryo sack can be the same as for Polygonum or Allium species. The embryo sack's nuclear poles become fused before fertilization. The three antipodes are usually ephemeral or persistent as in the case of Atropa. The fruit can be a berry as in the case of the tomato or wolfberry, or a dehiscent capsule as in Datura, or a drupe. The fruit has axial placentation. The capsules are normally septicidal or rarely loculicidal or valvate. The seeds are usually endospermic, oily (rarely starchy), and without obvious hairs. The seeds of most Solanaceae are round and flat, about 2–4 mm (0.079–0.157 in) in diameter. The embryo can be straight or curved, and has two cotyledons. Most species in the Solanaceae have 2n=24 chromosomes, but the number may be a higher multiple of 12 due to polyploidy. Wild potatoes, of which there are about 200, are predominantly diploid (2 × 12 = 24 chromosomes), but triploid (3 × 12 = 36 chromosomes), tetraploid (4 × 12 = 48 chromosomes), pentaploid (5 × 12 = 60) and even hexaploid (6 × 12 = 72 chromosome) species or populations exist. The cultivated species Solanum tuberosum has 4 × 12 = 48 chromosomes. Some Capsicum species have 2 × 12 = 24 chromosomes, while others have 26 chromosomes.

=== Diversity of characteristics ===
Despite the previous description, the Solanaceae exhibit a large morphological variability, even in their reproductive characteristics. Examples of this diversity include:

- The number of carpels that form the gynoecium

In general, the Solanaceae have a gynoecium (the female part of the flower) formed of two carpels. However, Melananthus has a monocarpelar gynoecium, there are three or four carpels in Capsicum, three to five in Nicandra, some species of Jaborosa and Trianaea and four carpels in Iochroma umbellatum.

- The number of locules in the ovary

The number of locules in the ovary is usually the same as the number of carpels. However, some species occur in which the numbers are not the same due to the existence of false septa (internal walls that subdivide each locule), such as in Datura and some members of the Lycieae (the genera Grabowskia and Vassobia).

- Type of ovules and their number

The ovules are generally inverted, folded sharply backwards (anatropous), but some genera have ovules that are rotated at right angles to their stalk (campilotropous) as in Phrodus, Grabowskia or Vassobia), or are partially inverted (hemitropous as in Cestrum, Capsicum, Schizanthus and Lycium). The number of ovules per locule also varies from a few (two pairs in each locule in Grabowskia, one pair in each locule in Lycium) and very occasionally only one ovule is in each locule as for example in Melananthus.

- The type of fruit

The fruits of the great majority of the Solanaceae are berries or capsules (including pyxidia) and less often drupes. Berries are common in the subfamilies Cestroideae, Solanoideae (with the exception of Datura, Oryctus, Grabowskia and the tribe Hyoscyameae) and the tribe Juanulloideae (with the exception of Markea). Capsules are characteristic of the subfamilies Cestroideae (with the exception of Cestrum) and Schizanthoideae, the tribes Salpiglossoideae and Anthocercidoideae, and the genus Datura. The tribe Hyoscyameae has pyxidia. Drupes are typical of the Lycieae tribe and in Iochrominae.

== Taxonomy ==
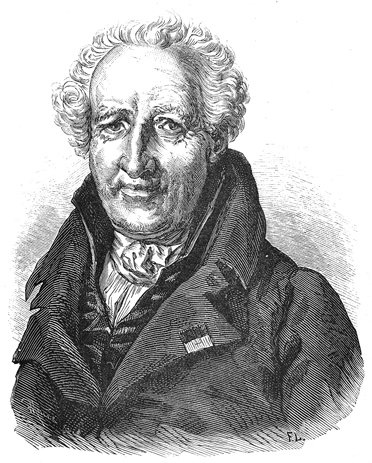
Antoine Laurent de Jussieu

One of the first scientific references to Solanaceae was in 1763 in French naturalist Michel Adanson's Familles des Plantes. He did not use a formal name for his taxon, and simply labeled the group as "Les Solanum". He included a total of 10 genera. Adanson is however not considered to be the authority of the family, that title instead being held by French botanist Antoine Laurent de Jussieu, who gave the group a formal scientific name in 1789 in his Genera Plantarum. Jussieu classified the taxon as an order and used the name "Solaneæ". His order included 19 genera, some of which—such as Verbascum blattaria, Bontia, and Crescentia cujete—are no longer considered members of the family. Some genera Jussieu included within Solanaceae he proposed could belong to Boraginaceae, which he also named in Genera Plantarum; he noted that there was a high degree of similarity between Solanaceae and Boraginaceae, and proposed that they could be considered one order.

Following Jussieu's publication, taxonomists have heavily revised, re-examined, and added to the taxon. "Solaneæ" was reclassified as a family by the 1820s, and began to be called "Solanaceae" by some authors around the 1830s, which became the standard name by 1905 per the ICBN nomenclature rules.

In 1835, Gilbert Burnett was the first to publish a subclassification of Solanaceae, and included 4 subgroups: Cestridæ, Nolanidæ, Solanidæ, and Verbascidæ. While Cestridæ and Solanidæ were broadly accepted as subfamilies (later renamed Cestroideae and Solanoideae), Nolanidæ and Verbascidæ, having several non-solanaceous characteristics, were only tentatively assigned to the family by Burnett and eventually were split from the family. While several core genera were widely accepted to be a part of Solanaceae, others have been less stable in their placement. The problem of some species having a mix of solanaceous and non-solanaceous traits continued to be a significant source of conflict in Solanaceae taxnomy. The families Duckeodendraceae, Goetzaceae, and Nolanaceae were particularly tantalizing; it had long been known that they were closely related to Solanceae, but to what extent was unclear. All three families have extremely similar wood anatomy to Solanaceae, and in at least the case of Goetzeaceae leaf anatomy as well.

The advent of molecular phylogenetics in the late 20th century allowed genetic and chemical data to be incorporated into cladistics, providing a new robust method of uncovering evolutionary relationships. An early molecular study by Olmstead et al. in 1999 provided a significant update to Solanaceae taxonomy, splitting Cestroideae into 5 subfamilies, Solaneae into multiple tribes, and finding Nolana and Geotzeaceae (demoted to subfamily Geotzoideae) to indeed be members of the family. Further studies found Duckeodendraceae to be in the family as well. The contents of the family are now mostly agreed upon, although the exact position of the subgroups is still debated. The December 2024 World Flora Online classification lists 8 subfamilies, 18 tribes, 103 genera, and 2,729 species in the family, shown below. (Note: Atrichodendron and Tuberowithania are not listed under Solanaceae in the WFO Plant List, but are in their database. While Tuberowithania is a nightshade, a member of the tribe Physalideae, Atrichodendron may be a member of Boraginaceae and is not included below.)

Subfamily Cestroideae

- Protoschwenkia (1 sp.)
- Tribe Benthamiellae
  - Benthamiella (12 sp.)
  - Combera (2 sp.)
- Tribe Browallieae
  - Browallia (22 sp.)
  - Streptosolen (1 sp.)
- Tribe Cestreae
  - Cestrum (172 sp.)
  - Sessea (24 sp.)
  - Vestia (1 sp.)
- Tribe Salpiglossideae
  - Reyesia (4 sp.)
  - Salpiglossis (2 sp.)

Subfamily Duckeodendroideae

- Duckeodendron (1 sp.)

Subfamily Goetzeoideae

- Coeloneurum (1 sp.)
- Espadaea (1 sp.)
- Goetzea (2 sp.)
- Henoonia (1 sp.)
- Metternichia (1 sp.)
- Tsoala (1 sp.)

Subfamily Nicotianoideae

- Tribe Anthocerideae
  - Anthocercis (10 sp.)
  - Anthotroche (3 sp.)
  - Crenidium (1 sp.)
  - Cyphanthera (8 sp.)
  - Duboisia (4 sp.)
  - Grammosolen (4 sp.)
  - Symonanthus (2 sp.)
- Tribe Nicotianeae
  - Nicotiana (101 sp.)

Subfamily Petunioideae

- Tribe Petunieae
  - Bouchetia (3 sp.)
  - Brunfelsia (49 sp.)
  - Calibrachoa (29 sp.)
  - Fabiana (16 sp.)
  - Hunzikeria (4 sp.)
  - Leptoglossis (6 sp.)
  - Nierembergia (20 sp.)
  - × Petchoa (hybrid)
  - Petunia (16 sp.)
  - Plowmania (1 sp.)

Subfamily Schizanthoideae

- Schizanthus (16 sp.)

Subfamily Schwenckioideae

- Heteranthia (1 sp.)
- Melananthus (5 sp.)
- Schwenckia (20 sp.)

Subfamily Solanoideae

- Nectouxia (1 sp.)
- Salpichroa (22 sp.)
- Tribe Capsiceae
  - Capsicum (43 sp.)
  - Lycianthes (137 sp.)
- Tribe Datureae
  - Brugmansia (10 sp.)
  - Datura (15 sp.)
  - Daturodendron (1 sp.)
  - Trompettia (1 sp.)
- Tribe Hyoscyameae
  - Anisodus (4 sp.)
  - Atropa (1 sp.)
  - Atropanthe (1 sp.)
  - Hyoscyamus (17 sp.)
  - Physochlaina (7 sp.)
  - Przewalskia (1 sp.)
  - Scopolia (2 sp.)
- Tribe Jaboroseae
  - Jaborosa (23 sp.)
- Tribe Latueae
  - Latua (1 sp.)
- Tribe Lycieae
  - Lycium (93 sp.)
  - Nolana (98 sp.)
  - Sclerophylax (12 sp.)
- Tribe Mandragoreae
  - Mandragora (2 sp.)
- Tribe Nicandreae
  - Exodeconus (6 sp.)
  - Nicandra (3 sp.)
- Tribe Solandreae
  - Doselia (4 sp.)
  - Dyssochroma (3 sp.)
  - Ectozoma Miers (1 sp.)
  - Hawkesiophyton (3 sp.)
  - Juanulloa (8 sp.)
  - Markea (14 sp.)
  - Merinthopodium (3 sp.)
  - Poortmannia (1 sp.)
  - Schultesianthus (8 sp.)
  - Solandra (10 sp.)
  - Trianaea (3 sp.)

Subfamily Solanoideae (cont.)

- Tribe Physalideae
  - Alkekengi (1 sp.)
  - Athenaea (14 sp.)
  - Calliphysalis (1 sp.)
  - Capsicophysalis (1 sp.)
  - Cataracta (1 sp.)
  - Chamaesaracha (12 sp.)
  - Cuatresia (19 sp.)
  - Darcyanthus (1 sp.)
  - Deprea (52 sp.)
  - Discopodium (2 sp.)
  - Dunalia (4 sp.)
  - Eriolarynx (4 sp.)
  - Iochroma (30 sp.)
  - Leucophysalis (2 sp.)
  - Mellissia (1 sp.)
  - Nothocestrum (4 sp.)
  - Orcytes (9 sp.)
  - Pantacantha (1 sp.)
  - Physalis (84 sp.)
  - Quincula (1 sp.)
  - Saracha (5 sp.)
  - Schraderanthus (1 sp.)
  - Streptosolen (1 sp.)
  - Trozelia (2 sp.)
  - Tuberowithania (1 sp.)
  - Tubocapsicum (1 sp.)
  - Tzeltalia (3 sp.)
  - Vassobia (2 sp.)
  - Withania (9 sp.)
  - Witheringia (19 sp.)
- Tribe Solaneae
  - Jaltomata (72 sp.)
  - Solanum (1245 sp.)

== Evolution ==
=== Origin ===
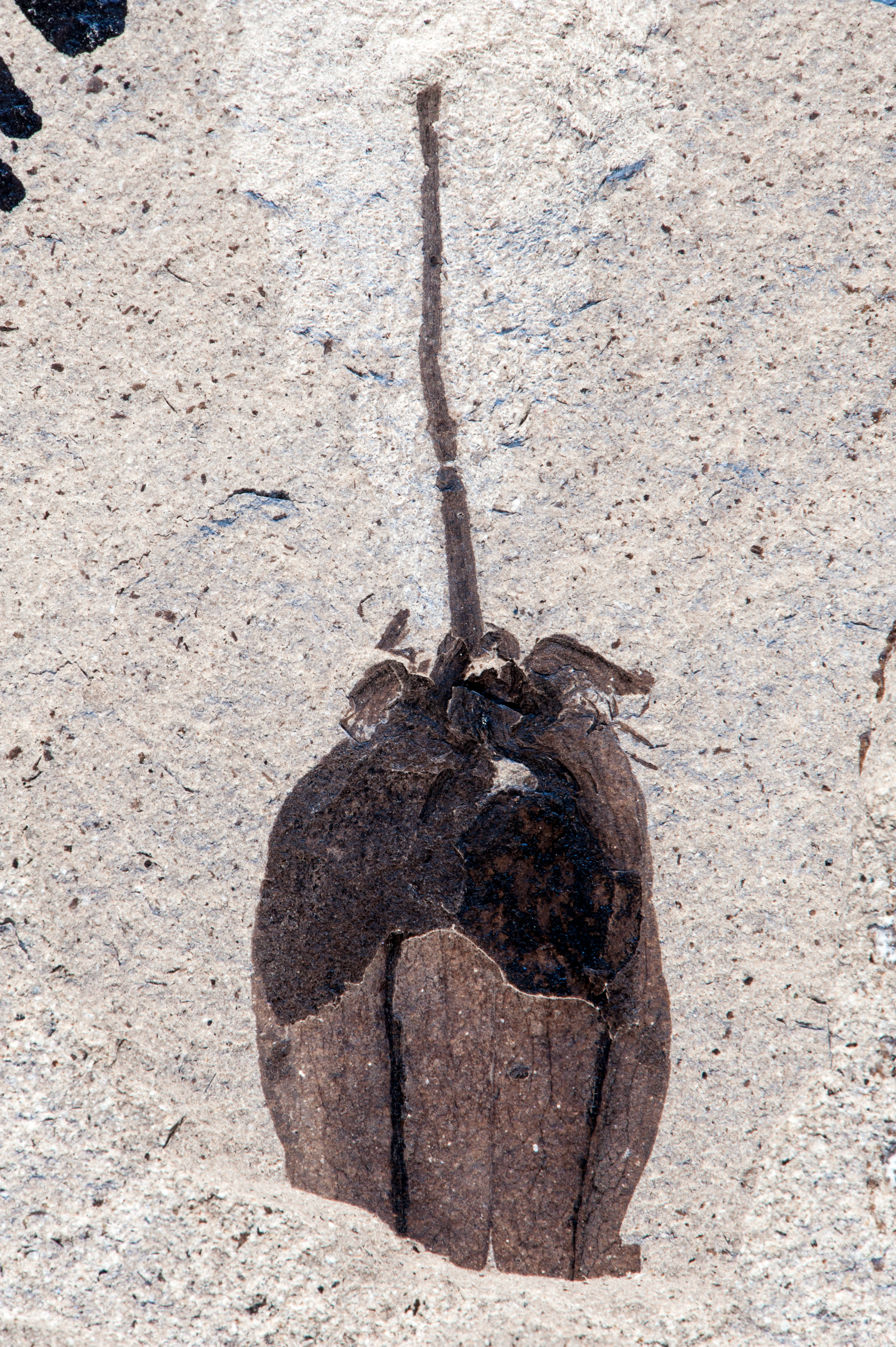
Fossilized fruit of Physalis infinemundi, one of the oldest known nightshades.

The early evolution of Solanaceae is poorly understood in part due to the extremely sparse fossil record. Only a few dozen species in the fossil record have been firmly identified as nightshades. Estimates for the origin of the family vary considerably, with molecular clocks ranging from 30.9 to 83.3 million years ago. The oldest fossil nightshades however, Physalis hunickenii and Physalis infinemundi, firmly place the minimum possible age of the family at 52 million years old. The existence of these fossils indicates that the family is likely significantly older than previously expected. Their position near the base of the tribe Physalideae suggests that Solanaceae had already begun to diversify into its modern lineages by this time.

Using these new fossils, a team in 2023 estimated the age of Solanaceae to be approximately 73.3 million years old. Their work proposed that after the K-Pg mass extinction, the family began to diversify rapidly, with all subfamilies diverging from each other by 56 million years ago. The subfamily Solanoideae was the last to split off from the rest, but experienced the most diversification, and now accounts for 80% of all nightshades. During the Paleocene-Eocene thermal maximum, nearly all solanoid tribal lineages diverged from each other in only about four million years.

=== Dispersion and diversification ===
Solanaceae originated in South America. It is unique in this regard compared to other families in the order Solanales, which originated primarily in Africa. Its geographic isolation as a result is likely what triggered its initial diversification into a distinct lineage.

From South America, nightshades rapidly colonized the rest of the Americas as they continued to diversify. The spread of nightshades into the Old World happened several times throughout its history. From South America, nightshades spread west over the Pacific into Oceania and east over the Atlantic into Africa. Nightshades reached Eurasia first from North America, and more recently were brought over by humans during the Columbian exchange. In total, there have been about 15–20 natural dispersal events that carried Solanaceae over Earth's oceans. These events could have occurred through various methods, such as seeds being blown through wind currents or floating over the ocean's surface, or carried by migrating animals such as birds.

=== Phylogeny ===
- Solanaceae
  - Duckeodendroideae
  - Schizanthoideae
  - Goetzeoideae
  - - Cestroideae
    - Schwenckioideae
    - - Petunioideae
      - X=12 clade
        - Nicotianoideae
        - Solanoideae

Phylogeny of Solanaceae. The exact placement of several groups is still debated.

- - - Solanum
    - - - Lycianthes
        - Physalis
      - Jaltomata
  - - Datura
    - Nicandra
- - Lycium
  - Nicotiana

Internal phylogeny of the X=12 clade, based on a consensus of 500 trees randomly sampled from 1-Mb genomic windows with 200-kb step size. The original source includes alternative trees.

The exact relationships within Solanaceae are generally poorly understood. Olmstead et al. (1999) firmly established the contents of the family and outlined its phylogeny: Schwenkioideae, Goetzeoideae, and Schizanthoideae are the most basal, Nicotianoideae and Solanoideae form a well-supported "X=12" clade, and Petunioideae and Cestroideae are closer to the latter than the former. Subfamilial relationships outside the X=12 clade were poorly supported, a problem faced by many future studies as well. A study by Särkinen et al. (2013) with over 1,000 species only found weak support for many clades near the base of the tree. It found that Duckeodendron, Schizanthus (subfamily Schizanthoideae), and Goetzeoideae were among the most basal, but didn't resolve the relationships between them, and that Cestroideae, Schwenckioideae, and Petunioideae were closer to the well supported "X=12" clade (Nicotianoideae + Solanoideae), albeit with low support. Another large study from Huang et al. (2023) placed Schizanthus as the most basal of all nightshades, Cestroideae and Schwenkioideae as sisters, and Petunioideae as the sister to the X=12 clade. it had fairly high support for many basal clades in the family compared to previous studies, although were still generally low.

== Distribution and habitat ==
Map showing the distribution of the Solanaceae throughout the world (light green areas)

Even though members of the Solanaceae are found on all continents except Antarctica, the greatest variety of species are found in Central America and South America. Centers of diversity also occur in Australia and Africa. Solanaceae occupy a great number of different ecosystems, from deserts to rainforests, and are often found in the secondary vegetation that colonizes disturbed areas. In general, plants in this family are of tropical and temperate distribution.

== Ecology ==
The potato tuber moth (Phthorimaea operculella) is an oligophagous insect that prefers to feed on plants of the family Solanaceae, especially the potato plant (Solanum tuberosum). Female P. operculella use the leaves to lay their eggs and the hatched larvae will eat away at the mesophyll of the leaf. After feeding on the foliage, the larvae will then delve down and feed on the tubers and roots of the plant.

== Alkaloids ==
Hundreds of alkaloids are produced by various species of nightshades, including solanine, chaconine, atropine, tomatine, and several more. These are used as a natural pesticide by the plant, disrupting cellular and physiological processes in invading organisms. They are mainly targeted against insects, but can also function as fungicides, nematicides, and bactericides. In high amounts, some alkaloids can also be toxic to humans, but others are sought after for medicinal, recreational, or culinary purposes.

=== Solanine ===
Chemical structure of solanine

Solanine is a toxic glycoalkaloid with a bitter taste, it has the formula C_{45}H_{73}NO_{15}. It is formed by the alkaloid solanidine with a carbohydrate side chain. It is found in leaves, fruit, and tubers of various Solanaceae such as the potato and tomato. Its production is thought to be an adaptive defence strategy against herbivores. Substance intoxication from solanine is characterized by gastrointestinal disorders (diarrhoea, vomiting, abdominal pain) and neurological disorders (hallucinations and headache). The median lethal dose is between 2 and 5 mg/kg of body weight. Symptoms manifest 8 to 12 hours after ingestion. The amount of these glycoalkaloids in potatoes, for example, varies significantly depending on environmental conditions during their cultivation, the length of storage, and the variety. The average glycoalkaloid concentration is 0.075 mg/g of potato. Solanine has occasionally been responsible for poisonings in people who ate berries from species such as Solanum nigrum or Solanum dulcamara, or green potatoes.

=== Tropanes ===
Chemical structure of the tropanes.

The term "tropane" comes from the genus Atropa, named after the Greek Fate, Atropos, who cut the thread of life. This nomenclature reflects its toxicity and lethality. They are bicyclic organic nitrogen compounds (IUPAC nomenclature: 8-methyl-8-azabicyclo[3.2.1]octane), with the chemical formula of C_{8}H_{15}N. These alkaloids include, among others, atropine, cocaine, scopolamine, and hyoscyamine. They are found in various species, such as mandrake (Mandragora officinarum and M. autumnalis ), black henbane or stinking nightshade (Hyoscyamus niger), belladonna (Atropa belladonna), jimson weed or devil's snare (Datura stramonium) and Brugmansia , as well as many others in the family Solanaceae. Pharmacologically, they are incredibly powerful anticholinergics, meaning they inhibit the neurological signals transmitted by the endogenous neurotransmitter, acetylcholine. More commonly, they can halt many types of allergic reactions. Symptoms of overdose may include dry mouth, dilated pupils, ataxia, urinary retention, hallucinations, convulsions, coma, and death. Atropine, a commonly used ophthalmological agent, dilates the pupils and thus facilitates examination of the interior of the eye. In fact, juice from the berries of A. belladonna were used by Italian courtesans during the Renaissance to exaggerate the size of their eyes by causing the dilation of their pupils ("bella donna" means "pretty woman" in Italian). Despite the extreme toxicity of the tropanes, they are useful drugs when administered in extremely small dosages. They can reverse cholinergic poisoning, which can be caused by overexposure to organophosphate insecticides and chemical warfare agents such as sarin and VX. Scopolamine (found in Hyoscyamus muticus and Scopolia carniolica), is used as an antiemetic against motion sickness or for people suffering from nausea as a result of receiving chemotherapy. Scopolamine and hyoscyamine are the most widely used tropane alkaloids in pharmacology and medicine due to their effects on the parasympathetic nervous system. Atropine has a stimulant effect on the central nervous system and heart, whereas scopolamine has a sedative effect. These alkaloids cannot be substituted by any other class of compounds, so they are still in demand. This is one of the reasons for the development of an active field of research into the metabolism of the alkaloids, the enzymes involved, and the genes that produce them. Hyoscyamine 6-β-hydroxylase, for example, catalyses the hydroxylation of hyoscyamine that leads to the production of scopolamine at the end of the tropane's biosynthetic pathway. This enzyme has been isolated and the corresponding gene cloned from three species: H. niger, A. belladonna and B. candida.

=== Nicotine ===
Chemical structure of nicotine.

Nicotine (IUPAC nomenclature (S)-3-(1-methylpyrrolidin-2-yl) pyridine) is a pyrrolidine alkaloid produced in large quantities in the tobacco plant (Nicotiana tabacum). Edible Solanaceae such as eggplants, tomatoes, potatoes, and peppers also contain nicotine, but at concentrations 100,000 to 1,000,000 times less than tobacco. Nicotine's function in a plant is to act as a defense against herbivores, as it is a very effective neurotoxin, in particular against insects. In fact, nicotine has been used for many years as an insecticide, though its use is currently being replaced by synthetic molecules derived from its structure. At low concentrations, nicotine acts as a stimulant in mammals, which causes the dependency in smokers. Like the tropanes, it acts on cholinergic neurons, but with the opposite effect (it is an agonist as opposed to an antagonist). It has a higher specificity for nicotinic acetylcholine receptors than other ACh proteins.

=== Capsaicin ===
Chemical structure of capsaicin

Capsaicin (IUPAC nomenclature 8-methyl-N-vanillyl-trans-6-nonenamide) is structurally different from nicotine and the tropanes. It is found in species of the genus Capsicum, which includes chilis and habaneros and it is the active ingredient that determines the Scoville rating of these spices. The compound is not noticeably toxic to humans. However, it stimulates specific pain receptors in the majority of mammals, specifically those related to the perception of heat in the oral mucosa and other epithelial tissues. When capsaicin comes into contact with these mucosae, it causes a burning sensation little different from a burn caused by fire. Capsaicin affects only mammals, not birds. Pepper seeds can survive the digestive tracts of birds; their fruit becomes brightly coloured once its seeds are mature enough to germinate, thereby attracting the attention of birds that then distribute the seeds. Capsaicin extract is used to make pepper spray, a useful deterrent against aggressive mammals.

== Economic importance ==
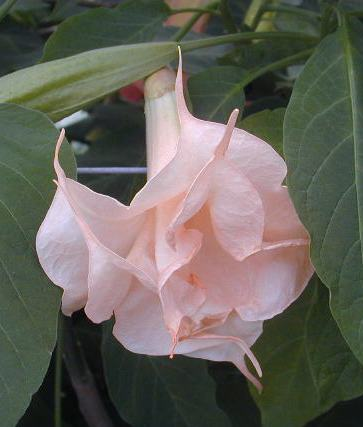
Pink, double-flowered Brugmansia cultivar

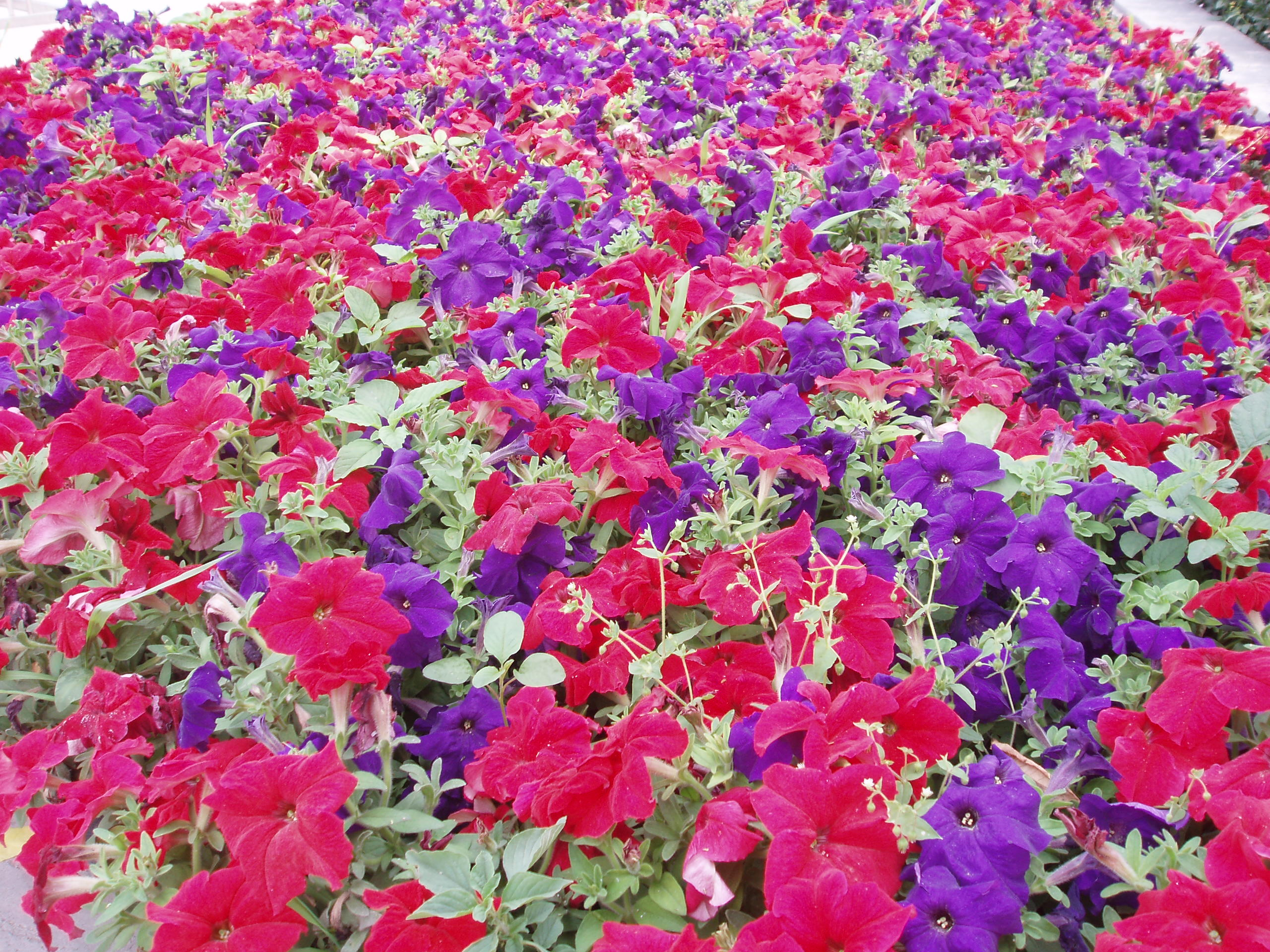
Petunia × atkinsiana, a herbaceous annual commonly cultivated as a summer bedding plant

The family Solanaceae contains such important food species as the potato (Solanum tuberosum), the tomato (Solanum lycopersicum), the pepper (Capsicum sp) and the aubergine or eggplant (Solanum melongena). Nicotiana tabacum, originally from South America, is now cultivated throughout the world to produce tobacco. Many solanaceas are important weeds in various parts of the world. Their importance lies in the fact that they can host pathogens or diseases of the cultivated plants, therefore their presence increases the loss of yield or the quality of the harvested product. An example of this can be seen with Acnistus arborescens and Browalia americana that host thrips, which cause damage to associated cultivated plants, and certain species of Datura that play host to various types of virus that are later transmitted to cultivated solanaceas. Some species of weeds such as, Solanum mauritianum in South Africa represent such serious ecological and economic problems that studies are being carried out with the objective of developing a biological control through the use of insects.

A wide variety of plant species and their cultivars belonging to the Solanaceae are grown as ornamental trees, shrubs, annuals and herbaceous perennials Examples include Brugmansia × candida ("angel's trumpet") grown for its large pendulous trumpet-shaped flowers, or Brunfelsia latifolia, whose flowers are very fragrant and change colour from violet to white over a period of 3 days. Other shrub species that are grown for their attractive flowers are Lycianthes rantonnetii (Blue Potato Bush or Paraguay Nightshade) with violet-blue flowers and Nicotiana glauca ("tree tobacco") Other solanaceous species and genera that are grown as ornamentals are the petunia (Petunia × hybrida), Lycium, Solanum, Cestrum, Calibrachoa × hybrida and Solandra. There is even a hybrid between Petunia and Calibrachoa (which constitutes a new nothogenus called × Petchoa G. Boker & J. Shaw) that is being sold as an ornamental. Many other species, in particular those that produce alkaloids, are used in pharmacology and medicine (Nicotiana, Hyoscyamus, and Datura).

=== Genomics ===
Many of the species belonging to this family, among them tobacco and the tomato, are model organisms that are used for research into fundamental biological questions. One of the aspects of the solanaceas' genomics is an international project that is trying to understand how the same collection of genes and proteins can give rise to a group of organisms that are so morphologically and ecologically different. The first objective of this project was to sequence the genome of the tomato. In order to achieve this each of the 12 chromosomes of the tomato's haploid genome was assigned to different sequencing centres in different countries. So chromosomes 1 and 10 were sequenced in the United States, 3 and 11 in China, 2 in Korea, 4 in Britain, 5 in India, 7 in France, 8 in Japan, 9 in Spain and 12 in Italy. The sequencing of the mitochondrial genome was carried out in Argentina and the chloroplast genome was sequenced in the European Union.

== See also ==
- List of plants poisonous to equines
