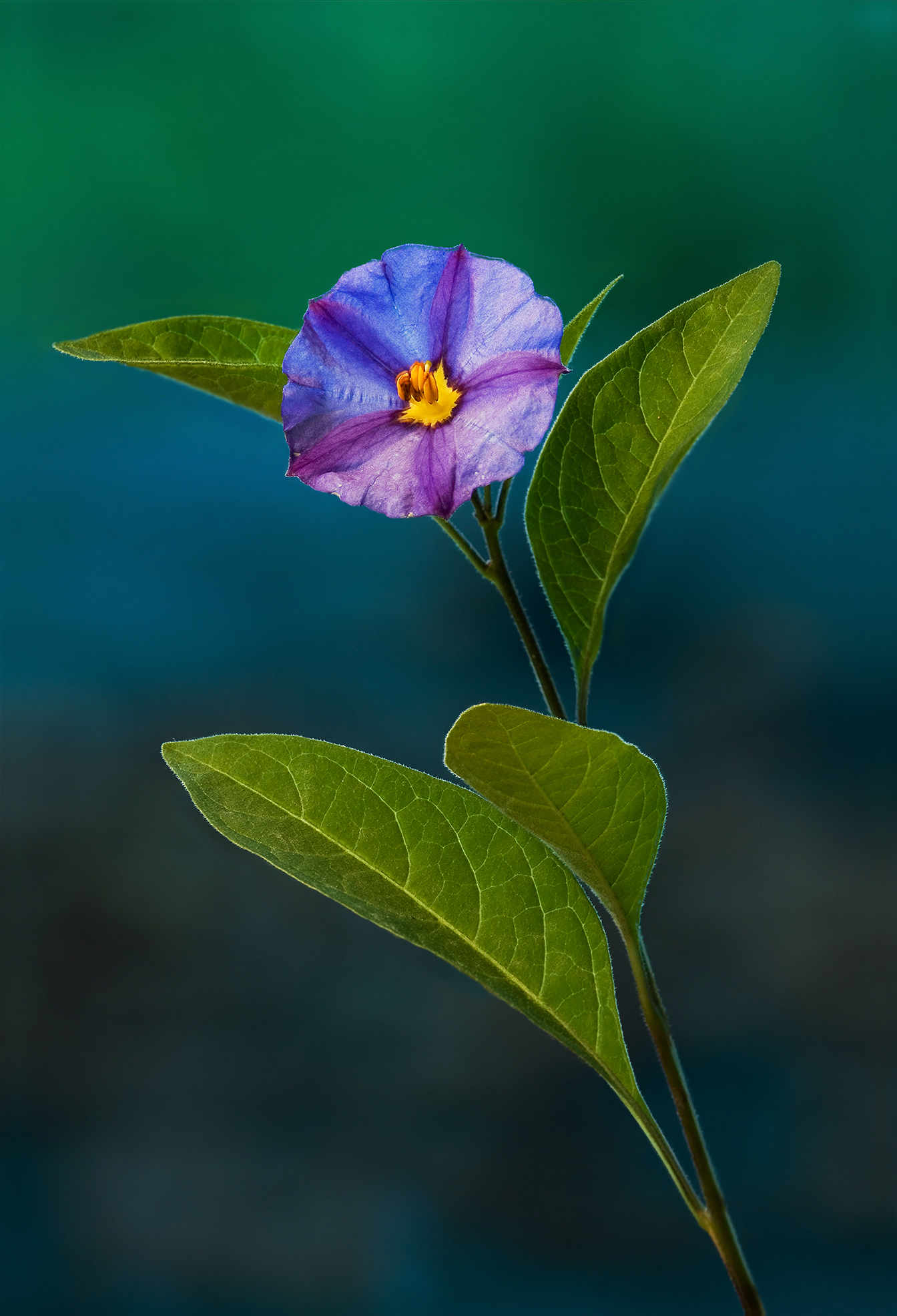
- Lycianthes rantonnetii (Blue potato bush)

Scientific classification
- Kingdom: Plantae
- Clade: Tracheophytes
- Clade: Angiosperms
- Clade: Eudicots
- Clade: Asterids
- Order: Solanales
- Family: Solanaceae
- Subfamily: Solanoideae
- Tribe: Capsiceae
- Genus: Lycianthes (Dunal) Hassl.

Species
- Over 150, see text

Synonyms
- Numaeacampa Gagnep.; Parascopolia Baill.

= Lycianthes =

Genus of flowering plants

Lycianthes is a genus of plants from the nightshade family (Solanaceae), found in both the Old World and the New World, but predominantly in the latter. It contains over 150 species, mostly from tropical America, with 35-40 species in Asia and the Pacific.

== Taxonomy ==
The genus Lycianthes is closely related to the genus Capsicum, the chili and bell peppers. However, it was long confused with the nightshades (genus Solanum), and several little-known Solanum species have now been reclassified to the genus Lycianthes.

=== Species ===
The following species are recognised in the genus Lycianthes:

- Lycianthes acapulcensis (Baill.) D'Arcy
- Lycianthes aceratia Bitter
- Lycianthes acidochondra (Bitter) Bitter
- Lycianthes actinocalyx (H.J.P.Winkl.) Bitter
- Lycianthes acutifolia (Ruiz & Pav.) Bitter
- Lycianthes amatitlanensis (J.M.Coult. & Donn.Sm.) Bitter
- Lycianthes amazonica Costa-Silva & Agra
- Lycianthes amphidoxys Standl.
- Lycianthes anomala Bitter
- Lycianthes apiculata Bitter
- Lycianthes armentalis J.L.Gentry
- Lycianthes arrazolensis (J.M.Coult. & Donn.Sm.) Bitter
- Lycianthes bambusarum (Bitter) Bitter
- Lycianthes banahaensis (Elmer) Bitter
- Lycianthes barbatula Standl. & Steyerm.
- Lycianthes baviensis V.V.Hop
- Lycianthes beckneriana D'Arcy
- Lycianthes belensis (Merr. & L.M.Perry) A.R.Bean
- Lycianthes biflora (Lour.) Bitter
- Lycianthes biformifolia (Ruiz & Pav.) Bitter
- Lycianthes bigeminata (Nees) Bitter
- Lycianthes bimensis (Miq.) Bitter
- Lycianthes bitteri Costa-Silva & Agra
- Lycianthes bitteriana (Symon) A.R.Bean
- Lycianthes boninensis Bitter
- Lycianthes brachyanthera Bitter
- Lycianthes brachyloba (Van Heurck & Müll.Arg.) Bitter
- Lycianthes breedlovei E.Dean
- Lycianthes bullata C.I.Orozco, C.A.Vargas & Serralde
- Lycianthes caeciliae Bitter
- Lycianthes caucaensis Bitter
- Lycianthes ceratocalycia (Donn.Sm.) Bitter
- Lycianthes chiapensis (Brandegee) Standl.
- Lycianthes chrysothrix Bitter
- Lycianthes ciliolata (M.Martens & Galeotti) Bitter
- Lycianthes cladotrichota (Bitter) Bitter
- Lycianthes coffeifolia Bitter
- Lycianthes coloradensis E.Dean & H.Kang
- Lycianthes columbiana Bitter
- Lycianthes connata J.L.Gentry
- Lycianthes coriacea Bitter
- Lycianthes crassipetala (Wall.) R.R.Mill
- Lycianthes cuchumatanensis J.L.Gentry
- Lycianthes cundinamarcae Bitter
- Lycianthes cutacensis (Kunth) J.F.Macbr.
- Lycianthes cyathocalyx (Van Heurck & Müll.Arg.) Bitter
- Lycianthes dejecta (Fernald) Bitter
- Lycianthes dendriticothrix Bitter
- Lycianthes dendropilosa (Symon) A.R.Bean
- Lycianthes densestrigosa (Bitter) Bitter
- Lycianthes denticulata (Blume) Bitter
- Lycianthes ecuadorensis Bitter
- Lycianthes fasciculata (Rusby) Bitter
- Lycianthes ferruginea Bitter
- Lycianthes floccosa Bitter
- Lycianthes fortunensis J.Poore & E.Dean
- Lycianthes francisci Benítez
- Lycianthes fredyclaudiae E.Dean
- Lycianthes fugax (Jacq.) Bitter
- Lycianthes furcatistellata Bitter
- Lycianthes geminiflora (M.Martens & Galeotti) Bitter
- Lycianthes glabripetala E.Dean
- Lycianthes glandulosa (Ruiz & Pav.) Bitter
- Lycianthes gongylodes J.L.Gentry
- Lycianthes gorgonea Bitter
- Lycianthes grandifolia E.Dean
- Lycianthes heterochondra (Bitter) Bitter
- Lycianthes heteroclita (Sendtn.) Bitter
- Lycianthes hintonii E.Dean
- Lycianthes hortulana Standl. & L.O.Williams
- Lycianthes howardiana D'Arcy
- Lycianthes hupehensis (Bitter) C.Y Wu & S.C.Huang
- Lycianthes hygrophila Bitter
- Lycianthes hypochrysea Bitter
- Lycianthes hypoleuca Standl.
- Lycianthes impar (Warb.) Bitter
- Lycianthes inaequilatera (Rusby) Bitter
- Lycianthes inconspicua Bitter
- Lycianthes jaliscensis E.Dean
- Lycianthes jelskii (Zahlbr.) Bitter
- Lycianthes kaernbachii (Lauterb. & K.Schum.) Bitter
- Lycianthes laevis (Dunal) Bitter
- Lycianthes lagunensis (Elmer) Bitter
- Lycianthes lenta (Cav.) Bitter
- Lycianthes leptocaulis (Rusby) Rusby
- Lycianthes limitanea (Standl.) J.L.Gentry
- Lycianthes lineata (Ruiz & Pav.) Bitter
- Lycianthes lucens S.Knapp
- Lycianthes lycioides (L.) Hassl.
- Lycianthes lysimachioides (Wall.) Bitter
- Lycianthes macrodon (Wall. ex Nees) Bitter
- Lycianthes magdalenae (Dunal) Bitter
- Lycianthes manantlanensis A.Rodr. & O.Vargas
- Lycianthes mariovelizii E.Dean
- Lycianthes marlipoensis C.Y.Wu & S.C.Huang
- Lycianthes maxonii Standl.
- Lycianthes medusocalyx (Bitter) Bitter
- Lycianthes michaelneei E.Dean
- Lycianthes minutipila Bitter
- Lycianthes moszkowskii (Bitter) Bitter
- Lycianthes mozinoana (Dunal) Bitter
- Lycianthes multiflora Bitter
- Lycianthes multifolia (Merr. & L.M.Perry) A.R.Bean
- Lycianthes neesiana (Wall. ex Nees) D'Arcy & Zhi Y.Zhang
- Lycianthes neglecta (Dunal) Lourteig
- Lycianthes nitida Bitter
- Lycianthes novogranatensis Moldenke
- Lycianthes ocellata (Donn.Sm.) C.V.Morton & Standl.
- Lycianthes oliveriana (Lauterb. & K.Schum.) Bitter
- Lycianthes orogenes Standl. & Steyerm.
- Lycianthes parasitica (Blume) Bitter
- Lycianthes pauciflora (Vahl) Bitter
- Lycianthes peduncularis (Schltdl.) Bitter
- Lycianthes peranomala (Wernham ex Ridl.) A.R.Bean
- Lycianthes pilifera (Benth.) Bitter
- Lycianthes poeppigii Bitter
- Lycianthes porteriana D'Arcy
- Lycianthes pringlei (B.L.Rob. & Greenm.) Bitter
- Lycianthes profunderugosa Bitter
- Lycianthes purpusii (Brandegee) Bitter
- Lycianthes quichensis (J.M.Coult. & Donn.Sm.) Bitter
- Lycianthes radiata (Sendtn.) Bitter
- Lycianthes rafatorresii E.Dean
- Lycianthes rantonnetii (Carrière) Bitter – blue potato bush
- Lycianthes reflexa Rusby
- Lycianthes repens (Spreng.) Bitter
- Lycianthes rimbachii Standl.
- Lycianthes rostellata (Merr. & L.M.Perry) A.R.Bean
- Lycianthes rzedowskii E.Dean
- Lycianthes sanctae-marthae Bitter
- Lycianthes sanctaeclarae (Greenm.) D'Arcy
- Lycianthes sancti-caroli (H.J.P.Winkl.) Bitter
- Lycianthes shanesii (F.Muell.) A.R.Bean
- Lycianthes shunningensis C.Y.Wu & S.C.Huang
- Lycianthes sideroxyloides (Schltdl.) Bitter
- Lycianthes sodiroi Bitter
- Lycianthes sprucei (Van Heurck & Müll.Arg.) Bitter
- Lycianthes starbuckii E.Dean
- Lycianthes stellata (Jacq.) Bitter
- Lycianthes stenoloba (Van Heurck & Müll.Arg.) Bitter
- Lycianthes stephanocalyx (Brandegee) Bitter
- Lycianthes surotatensis Gentry
- Lycianthes synanthera (Sendtn.) Bitter
- Lycianthes talamancensis E.Dean & J.Poore
- Lycianthes tarapotensis Bitter
- Lycianthes testacea (O.E.Schulz) S.Knapp
- Lycianthes textitlaniana E.Dean
- Lycianthes tibetica Li Bing Zhang & Yi F.Duan
- Lycianthes tricolor (Dunal) Bitter
- Lycianthes tysoniana D'Arcy
- Lycianthes urnigera Bitter
- Lycianthes venturana E.Dean
- Lycianthes virgata (Lam.) Bitter
- Lycianthes vitiensis (Seem.) A.R.Bean
- Lycianthes wollastonii (Wernham) A.R.Bean
- Lycianthes yunnanensis (Bitter) C.T.Wu & S.C.Huang

== See also ==
- Nonochton
