= Lycianthes mozinoana =

- Lycianthes mozinoana in habitat

Scientific classification
- Kingdom: Plantae
- Clade: Tracheophytes
- Clade: Angiosperms
- Clade: Eudicots
- Clade: Asterids
- Order: Solanales
- Family: Solanaceae
- Subfamily: Solanoideae
- Tribe: Capsiceae
- Genus: Lycianthes
- Species: L. mozinoana

Binomial name
- Lycianthes mozinoana (Dunal) Bitter

Synonyms
- Solanum mozinoanum Dunal

Species of flowering plant

flower from front

flower from behind showing 10-lobed calyx

hairy stem

plant base with emerging stems

Lycianthes mozinoana, with no commonly used English name though sometimes English speakers call it by its local Mexican name tlanochtle, is a herbaceous plant which grows as a perennial. Native only to Mexico, it belongs to the Nightshade Family, the Solanaceae.

== Description ==
These key features distinguish the polymorphic Lycianthes mozinoana from similar species:

- Arising from tubers which gradually diminish in width at each end, stems may recline on the ground, ascend, or stand erect, growing up to 90 cm (35 1/2 in) tall, though usually much lower. They die back each season far below the soil surface. The plant's green parts are covered with white hairs, or trichomes, which usually are unbranched and with no glands, and grow up to 2 mm (3/32 in) long though some are much shorter.
- Leaves are papery, simple with very short or no petioles. Blades develop in various shapes and are up to 10.5 cm (4 in) long and a little less than half as wide; blade margins develop no teeth or indentations, though they may be somewhat wavy to irregularly angled. Where leaves arise in pairs they are of unequal size.
- Flowers arise singly on pedicels up to 18 cm (7 in) long, though usually shorter; in flower, the pedicels are erect but bend downward in fruit. Peduncles are absent. Densely hairy calyces bear 10 fingerlike appendages 2 to 10 mm (3/32 to 13/32 in) long, which lie closely against the corolla. These appendages attach as much as 1 mm (1/32 in) below the calyx rim. As fruits enlarge, both the calyx and its appendages enlarge, the appendages often breaking. Corollas are up to 6.8 cm (2 1/2 in) in diameter, though sometimes half that. The lilac to dark purple or even white or pale lilac corolla's outer edge is only shallowly notched, there being no separate petals. On the corolla's back side dark purple stripes run along the main veins. Stamens of unequal length have yellow anthers up to 8.5 mm (5/16 in) long, with pollen escaping through pores at the anthers' tips, not slits along the side. Styles up to 14.5 mm (9/16 in) long extend beyond the anthers' tips.
- The soft, juicy, berry-type fruit is round to egg-shaped, to 28 mm (1 1/8 in) in diameter, and bears up to 139 small, smooth-skinned seeds. The fruit with its attached calyx hangs downward or lies on the ground.

== Distribution ==
Lycianthes mozinoana is endemic just to Mexico, where it occurs widely in the uplands from the states of Tamaulipas, Nuevo León, Coahuila and Durango in the north, south into the southernmost state of Chiapas. It is absent mainly in the arid northwestern states, including the Baja California peninsula, and also is absent from the Yucatan Peninsula.

== Habitat ==
The typical variety of the species occurs mainly on volcanic soils of the Trans-Mexican Volcanic Belt in disturbed areas such as pastures, agricultural fields, along paths and roadsides, and in clearings of dry scrub and oak forests and forests of conifers, at 1,600–3,000 m (5,200–9,800 ft) in elevation. The variety margaretiana inhabits oak and pine forests mixed with dry scrub at 900–2,700 m (3,000–8,900 ft) in elevation. The variety oaxacana, native only to Oaxaca state, is found both in weedy areas and forests with oaks and pines at 2,100–2,900 m (6,900–9,500 ft) in elevation.

== Uses by humans ==
=== Edible fruits ===
Lycianthes mozinoana, known in Mexico by its Nahuatl name Tlanoxtle, has an edible fruit gathered in certain regions of Mexico. The species' broad distribution area has been suggested as resulting from dispersal by humans.

In modern times the juicy, sweet, slightly tart fruits are eaten raw. Fruit maturity often coincides closely with the maturation of field crops, so Tlanoxtle fruits and the crop may be harvested at the same time. At home, the fruits are eaten like grapes or wrapped in tortillas. If the fruit harvest is abundant, the fruits may be boiled in sugar syrup and canned to make preserves. Also the fruits can be dried, often the fruits' long pedicels being braided and the resulting bunches hung from rafters of the house. After 15-20 days the fruits become dark and wrinkled, with a raisin-like texture and a very sweet flavor. Fruits sometimes appear in regional markets

=== In traditional medicine ===
In Mexico's central state of México, country people take 3 tubers, which serve as a laxative with no painful effects.

=== In traditional ceremonies ===
Lycianthes mozinoana fruits may be offered during Mexico's Day of the Dead ceremonies. They are placed on an altar along with other such offerings, some of them fragrant, such as marigold, and burning copal incense. The fragrance of sweet Tlanoxtle fruits combined with the other fragrances represents the supernatural "essence" of the offering.

== Taxonomy ==
=== Varieties ===
In 2026, these three varieties of Lycianthes mozinoana were recognized:

- Lycianthes mozinoana var. margaretiana (northeastern Mexico)
- Lycianthes mozinoana var. mozinoana (mostly the Trans-Mexican Volcanic Belt)
- Lycianthes mozinoana var. oaxacana (Oaxaca state)

=== Is it mozinoana or moziniana? ===
There can be confusion about whether the species here called Lycianthes mozinoana should be spelled Lycianthes moziniana.

In 1814, Lycianthes mozinoana was formally named using the basionym Solanum mozinoanum. In terms of Latin grammar, in 1919 when that species was transferred from the neuter genus Solanum to the feminine genus Lycianthes, following rules suggested by the International Rules of Botanical Nomenclature then in force (the Brussels Rules of 1912, Chapter I, Article 7), the neuter species name ending -um was changed to the feminine ending -a, resulting in the name Lycianthes mozinoana. This name is used by major international databases such as Plants of the World Online.

However, Mexican authorities, such as the governmental Comisión Nacional para el Conocimiento y Uso de la Biodiversidad (CONABIO) and associated databases, continue using the spelling moziniana. Possibly this hesitancy to change is influenced by the definitive monograph of Mexican Lycianthes species published in 2020 by Ellen Dean, which also uses it. Currently in Mexican academic papers, herbaria and university databases this spelling is well established.

=== From the protologue ===
In 1814 when Michel Félix Dunal formally described and named Lycianthes mozinoana with the basionym Solanum mozinoanum, his description was taken from a painting resulting from the Royal Botanical Expedition to New Spain (1787–1803) under the direction of Martín de Sessé y Lacasta. It can be noted that more than half of the names coined by Mociño and the leader of the Expedition Sessé have no physical material associated with them.

=== Phylogeny ===
Within the genus Lycianthes, based on traditional analysis methods, Lycianthes mozinoana belongs to the series Meizonodontae, which includes 8 species and 2 varieties. The other 7 species are: Lycianthes acapulcensis, Lycianthes ciliolata, Lycianthes dejecta, Lycianthes hintonii, Lycianthes peduncularis, Lycianthes rzedowskii, and Lycianthes starbuckii. All of these occur within the area from Mexico to central Costa Rica, and are perennial herbs producing solitary flowers, calyces with 10 appendages, and have round corollas. The chromosome number is x = 12.

=== Etymology ===
The genus name Lycianthes is based on the preexisting genus Lycium, and the Greek anthos, meaning "flower." Presumably this alludes to the resemblance of the spiny Lycianthes lycioides to species of Lycium, which often are thorny.

Presumably the species name mozinoana, or mozinoanum, was chosen to honor José Mariano Mociño, a Mexican botanist who played an important role during the Royal Botanical Expedition to New Spain of 1787–1803. During that expedition the plant was discovered that is represented in the illustration consulted by Dunal when he formally described and named Solanum mozinoanum.
