= Ice jelly =

Ice jelly may refer to:

- Aiyu jelly, a Taiwanese dessert
- Bingfen, a dessert in Southwest China
