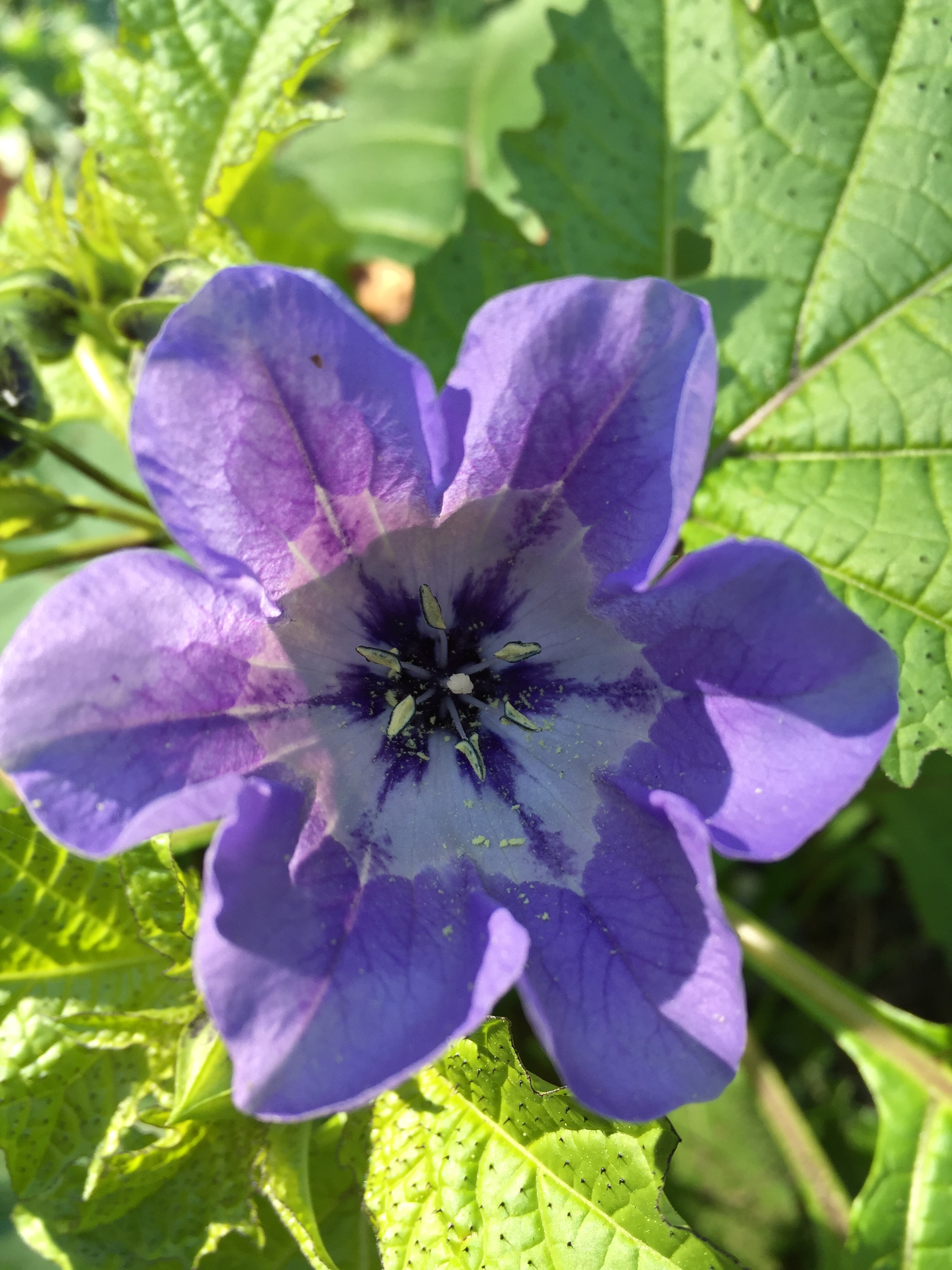

Scientific classification
- Kingdom: Plantae
- Clade: Tracheophytes
- Clade: Angiosperms
- Clade: Eudicots
- Clade: Asterids
- Order: Solanales
- Family: Solanaceae
- Genus: Nicandra
- Species: N. physalodes

Binomial name
- Nicandra physalodes (L.) Gaertn.

= Nicandra physalodes =

Species of flowering plant in the nightshade family

Nicandra physalodes is a species of flowering plant in subfamily Solanoideae of the nightshade family. It is known by the common names apple-of-Peru and shoo-fly plant. It is thought originally to have been native to western South America, including Peru, and is known elsewhere as an introduced and ruderal species – sometimes as a weed – in tropical, subtropical and, to a lesser extent, temperate areas all over the world. It has also long been cultivated as an ornamental plant for its attractive flowers and curious fruits (the latter sometimes dried for use in floral design) and has been adopted into the traditional medicine of countries far-removed from its original home.

== Description ==
Nicandra physalodes is an annual species growing to 1 metre tall with spreading branches and ovate, mid-green, toothed and waved leaves. The flowers are bell-shaped and 5 centimeters or more across, pale violet with white throats (occasionally pure white), opening only for a few hours in the day. The flower becomes lantern-like towards the end of its blooming period, the inflated calyces somewhat resembling those of certain Physalis spp., although in Nicandra (unlike in Physalis) the fruiting calyx is deeply lobed, (the sepals cordate) and not a single, undivided, bladder-like structure. The plant is thought to have insect repellent properties, particularly in relation to whitefly. N. physalodes seeds have a relatively thick testa (seed coat) and exhibit strong dormancy, which may, however be broken by a combination of warm and cold stratification, involving temperature fluctuation between 15 and 25 °C (59 and 77 °F).

== Distribution ==
Nicandra physalodes is native to western South America – Northwest Argentina, Bolivia, North and Central Chile and Peru. It has been introduced in many tropical and temperate regions worldwide. It is a weed of arable land nearly worldwide. In the British Isles, the plant is a frequent casual, found in bare or sparsely grassy places, including cultivated ground, waste places and rubbish tips. Its occurrence is often traceable to the presence of its seeds in commercial brands of bird seed.

== Stock poison ==
Nicandra physalodes is suspected of having poisonous properties similar to those possessed by certain Physalis species implicated in the poisoning of sheep. Some conflicting evidence in respect of these suspicions has emerged from Australia (where the plant is sometimes known as wild gooseberry), in which the plant has been suspected, on rather vague evidence, of poisoning stock at various times, although a feeding test carried out in New South Wales using a sheep and a goat gave negative results. A case was reported from New South Wales in 1970 in which two crossbred ewes died, apparently as a result of consuming this plant. The animals had been left to graze in a paddock of Wimmera ryegrass heavily infested with Nicandra physalodes plants of around 60 cm (24 in) in height, such that they overtopped the grass. Both ewes died, with symptoms of bloat within 12 hours. At necropsy there were extensive hemorrhages in heart and lungs, but no other apparent abnormalities. The paunches of the ewes were observed to contain large amounts of Nicandra.

== Uses ==
The literature on the plant features somewhat conflicting accounts of use, as a species both edible and toxic/medicinal, pointing to the conclusion that it should be regarded as suspect and treated with caution. The whole plant is said to be toxic (even, according to some sources, very toxic) and to be used medicinally as a diuretic, sedative and cough medicine. The tender leaves have, on occasion, been cooked as a leaf vegetable or pot herb (e.g. in the cuisine of Tanzania), yet the decoction of the leaves has been used as an insecticide to treat head lice; while the juice of the fresh leaves has been used to treat amoebiasis. Unspecified medicinal uses of the leaves have also been recorded in the folk medicine of Brazil and Madagascar.

The rather dry, brown berries within the papery calyces have an odour reminiscent of cooking oil and, although described in at least one source as being poisonous, are eaten by the Raji people of Nepal. The seeds are said to be edible, but also to be employed as an insecticide and medicinally as an antipyretic, being boiled with water and taken for fever, indigestion and constipation, thus further implying laxative properties.

The seeds are used in traditional Tibetan medicine in which system they are described as having an acrid taste and to possess 'a cooling, very poisonous potency' manifested in effects that are analgesic, anthelmintic, antibiotic, anti-inflammatory and antipyretic; being used also to treat toothache, impotence and unspecified 'contagious disorders' and furthermore to 'increase bodily vigour' (i.e. to function as an adaptogen) if consumed in regular doses.

Nicandra physalodes is used as a folk remedy in several countries in the Himalaya, including Himachal Pradesh, Uttar Pradesh, Nepal and Sikkim, although it is not native to the region. This may be due to a popular recognition of a familial resemblance – particularly in regard to calyces inflated at fruiting – to several native Solanaceous plants of the Himalaya long used in traditional medical practices, the genera involved being Anisodus, Physochlaina, Przewalskia and Scopolia (all belonging to tribe Hyoscyameae of subfamily Solanoideae). The much valued (and consequently over-harvested) species Anisodus tanguticus is perhaps particularly relevant in this context.

Nicandra seeds have been used for at least a century in Southwestern China to produce the jelly used in the dessert known as bingfen (Chinese: 冰粉; pinyin: bīngfěn: literal translation: iced rice noodles), known usually in the west as crystal jelly or ice jelly and said to have been invented in the Qing dynasty. The jelly is prepared by pouring a quantity of the small, plump, brown seeds into an envelope of cheesecloth, soaking them for a time and then scrubbing them vigorously in a bowl of mineral water in order to liberate the pectin which they contain. Slaked lime is then stirred into the pectin-rich solution, causing it to set after a few hours into a delicate, yellowish jelly of neutral flavour. This gelatinous product is relished, not for its taste, but for its intriguing and pleasant texture and it serves as a 'blank canvas' for a variety of flavourings – notably a locally-produced, unrefined, brown sugar syrup with a molasses-like taste. Desserts based upon crystal jelly are particularly popular in the city of Chengdu, where they are valued both for the cooling relief they afford to those irked by the humid summer heat and the equally cooling contrast which they provide to the often highly-spiced, local Sichuan cuisine (see also Mala (seasoning).

In the southern United States, the juice of the plant has been mixed with milk as a poisoned bait for houseflies and blow flies in the same way in which the crumbled caps of the fungus Amanita muscaria were used in parts of Europe. However, the flies were said to be killed outright, rather than merely stupefied, as in the case of the mushroom/milk infusion.

== Chemistry ==
Nicandra physalodes contains nicandrenones, a group of the steroidal lactones known as withanolides. The nicandrenones, like certain other types of withanolide, have insecticidal properties. 30 years after their discovery, the first total synthesis of nicandrenones was carried out in the year 2000. Amongst its other paradoxical attributes, N. physalodes is also slightly intoxicating, showing a certain degree of psychoactivity of a type similar to that elicited by the tropane alkaloid hyoscyamine (well known as one of the active principles present in the notoriously toxic nightshades Hyoscyamus niger and Atropa belladonna and causing mydriasis – a symptom said also to be caused by the alkaloids present in Nicandra). This property of the plant is reflected in one of the common names given it in France (namely belladonne de pays i.e. 'country belladonna') and likewise in the common name belladona given it in Bolivia. It is not yet known whether this mild psychoactivity is referable to the alkaloid content or the withanolide content (or possibly to both – or indeed a synergy between the two). Like its more toxic relatives, Nicandra physalodes is alkaloidal, analyses having revealed the presence of the tropane alkaloid tropinone and the pyrrolidine alkaloid hygrine (0.1%, in the root). Withanolides are found almost exclusively in plants of the Solanaceae and, while it is noticeable that many psychoactive species belonging to that family contain only, or primarily, such compounds, not a single withanolide has yet been proven to be psychoactive. The compounds are named for the Solanaceous genus Withania, the best-known species of which, Withania somnifera, is, as its specific name suggests, mildly psychoactive to the extent of being sleep-inducing (among other useful medicinal properties). The use of W. somnifera (common name (i.a.) 'Indian ginseng') as a tonic (adaptogen) in Ayurvedic medicine parallels the use of Nicandra as an adaptogen in traditional Tibetan medicine (see above, under 'Uses') and is accounted for by withanolide content. Also present in Nicandra are calystegines, a new group of polyhydroxy alkaloids with a nortropane skeleton and named for the bindweed genus Calystegia (Convolvulaceae). Their occurrence has been noted in several species of the Solanaceae, including Atropa belladonna. The biosynthesis of these compounds is thought to take place via the tropane alkaloid pathway, the first metabolite being pseudotropine.

== Gallery ==
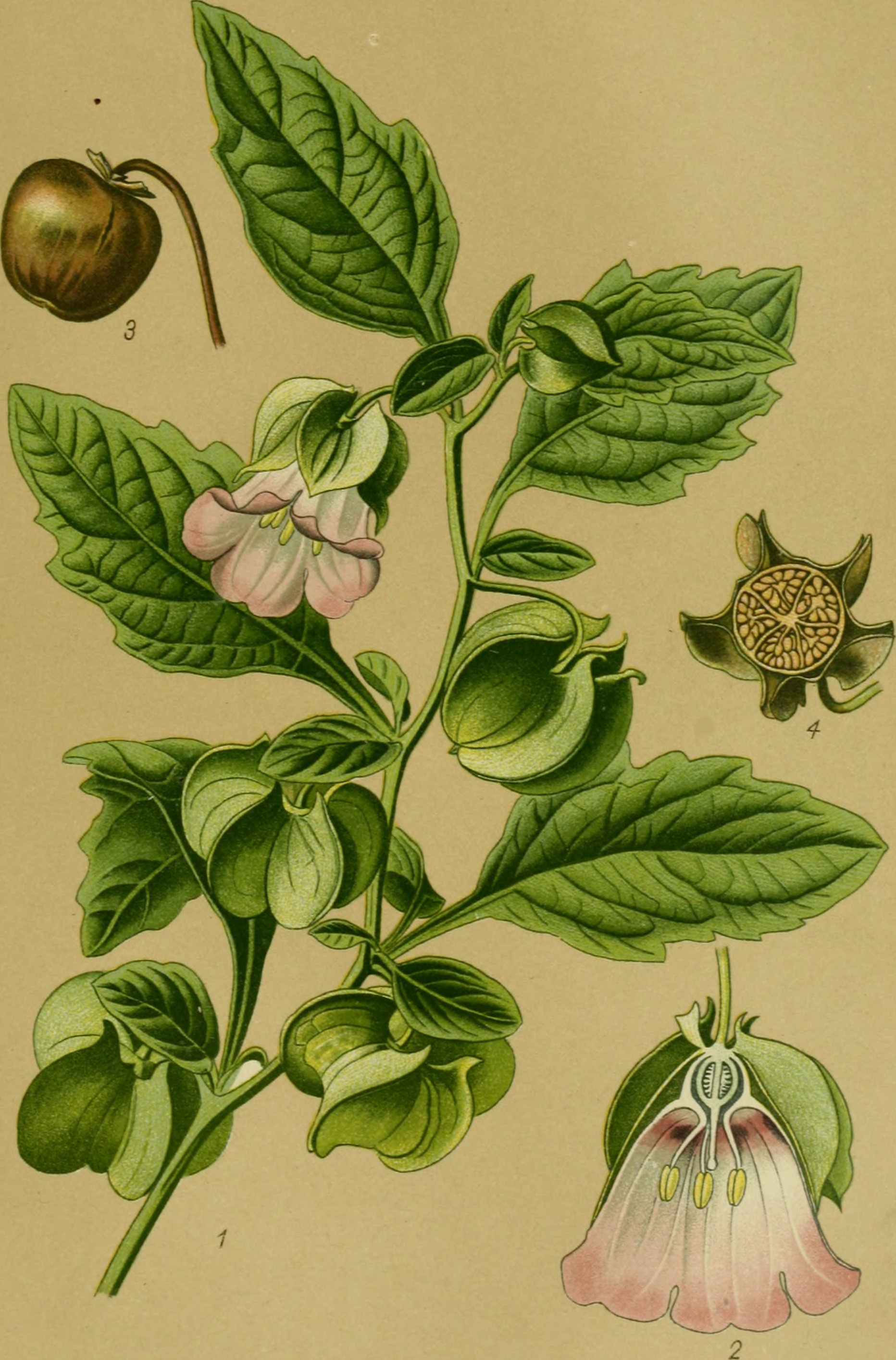

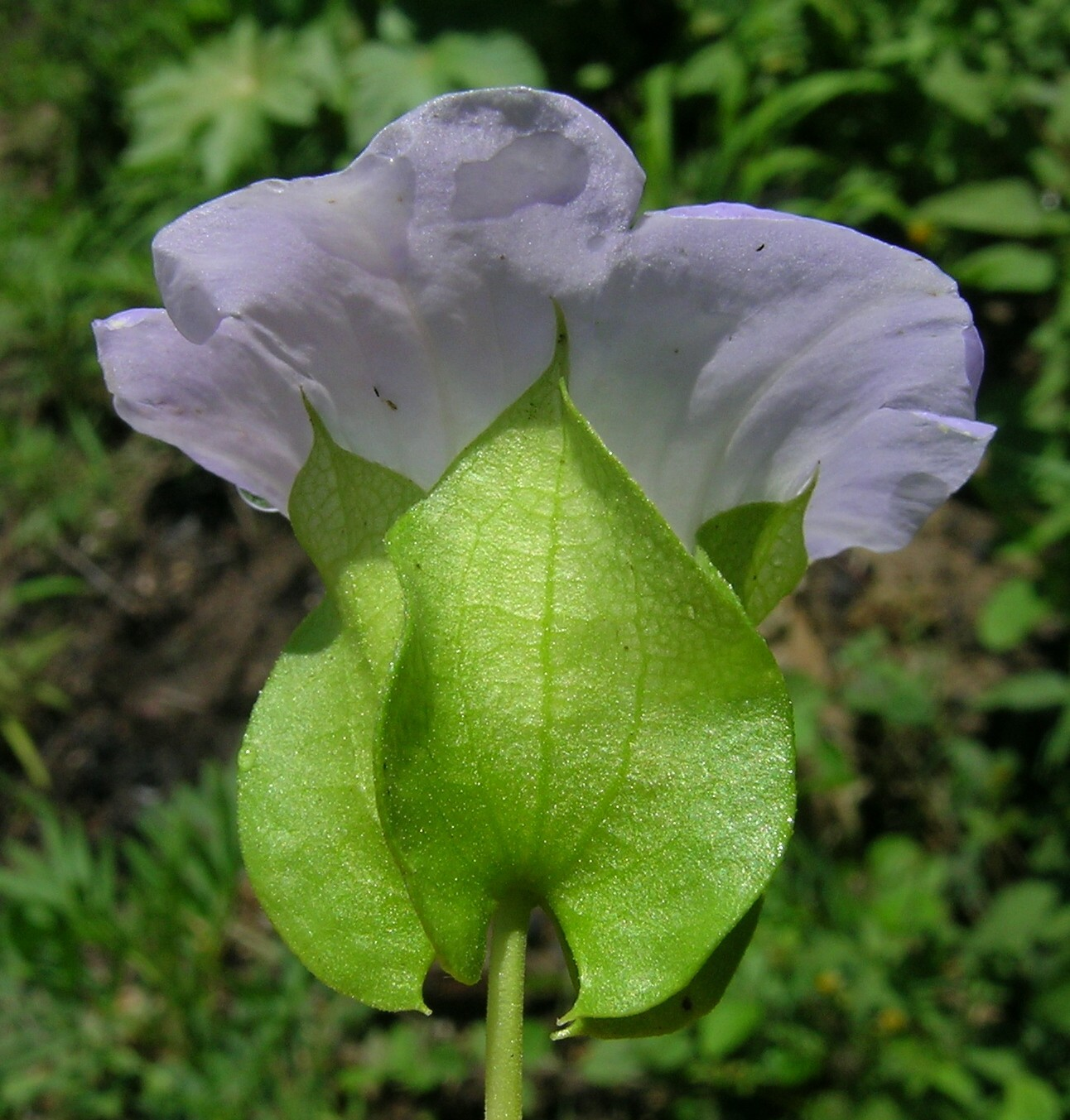

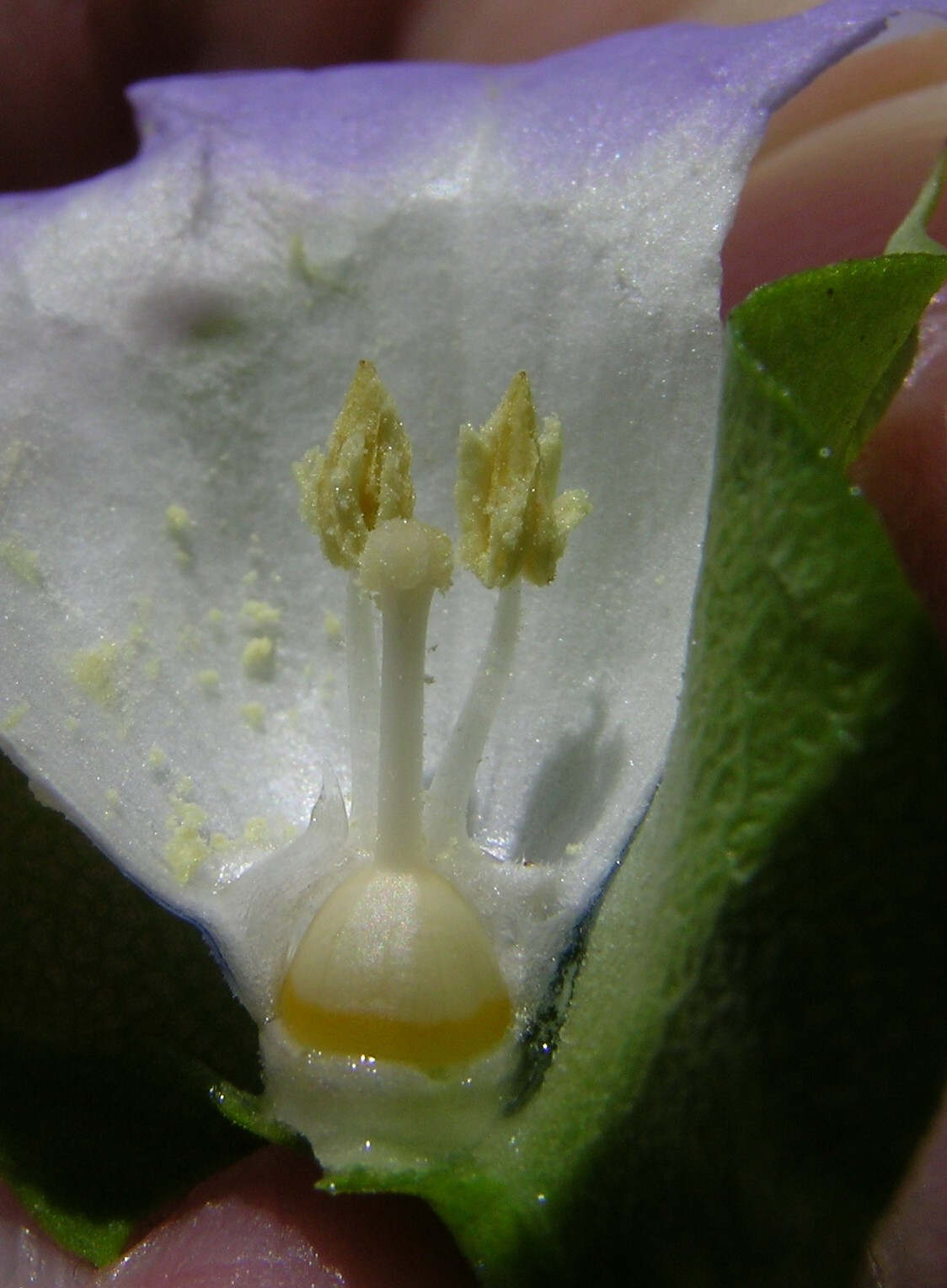

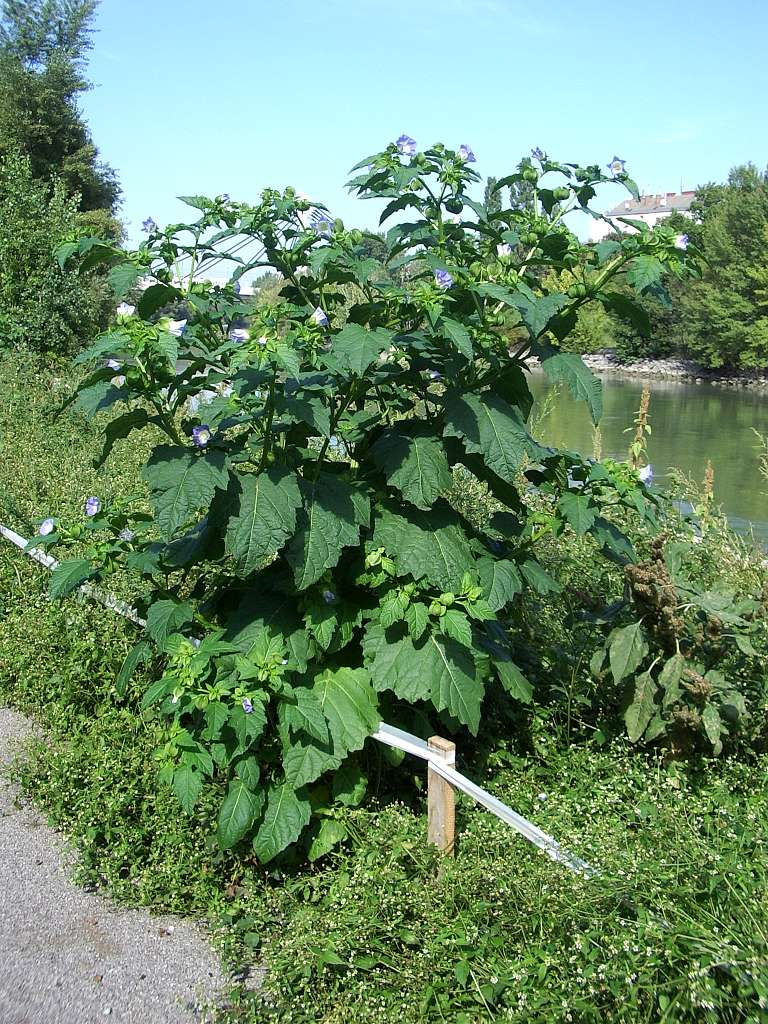

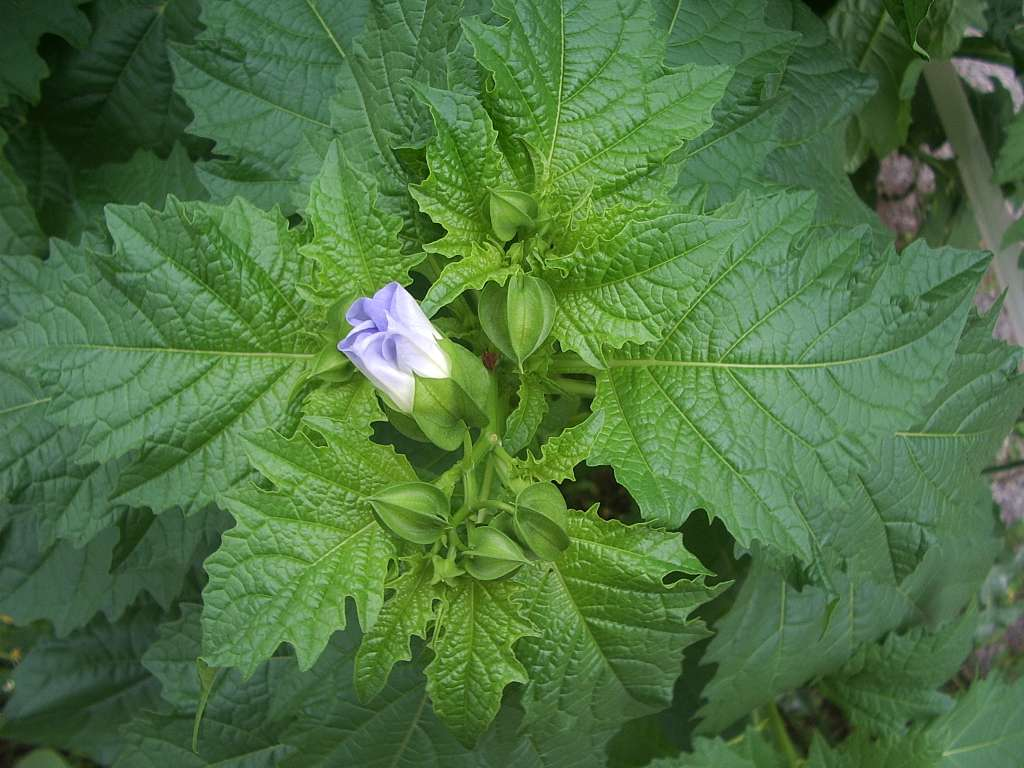

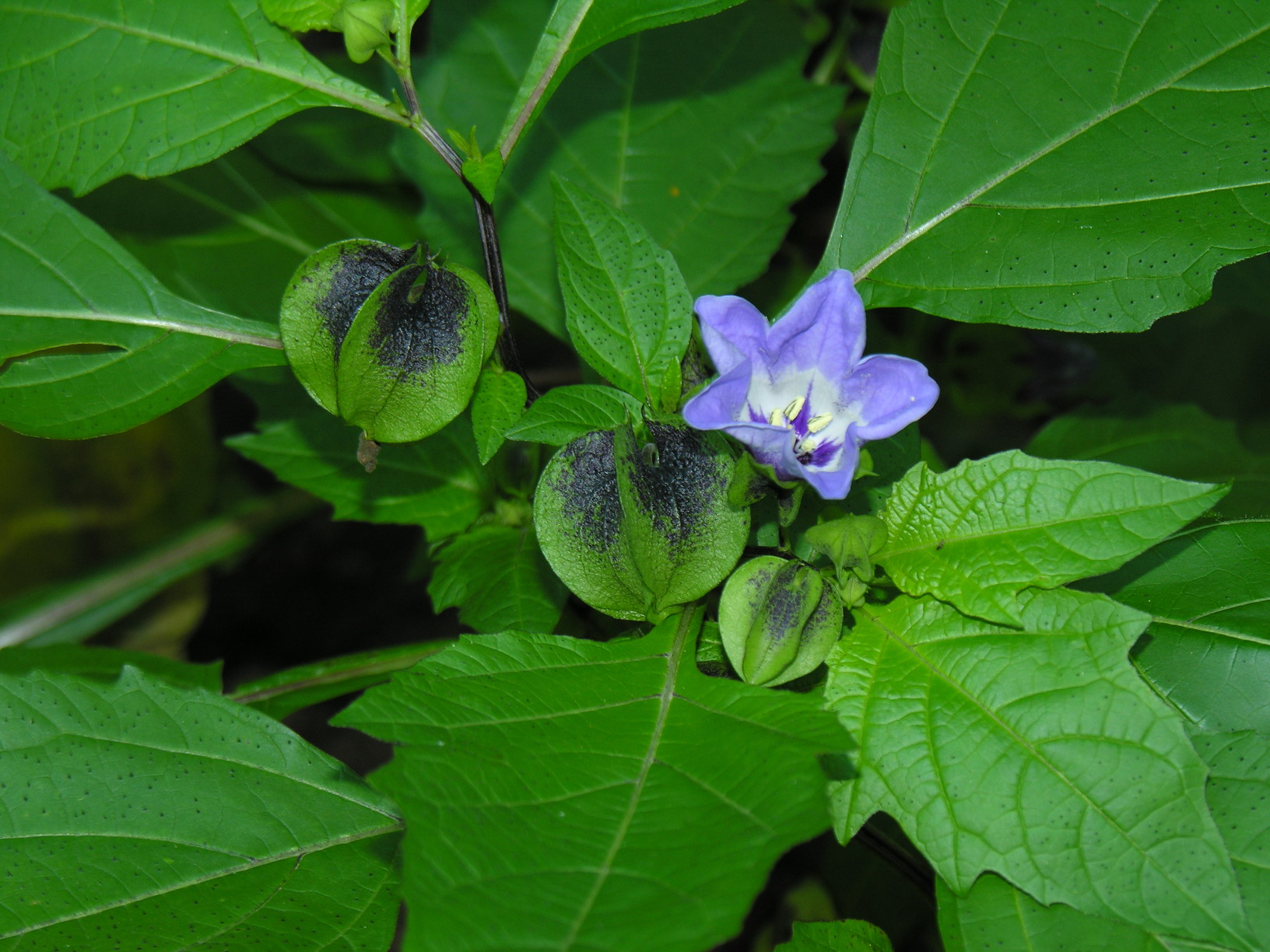

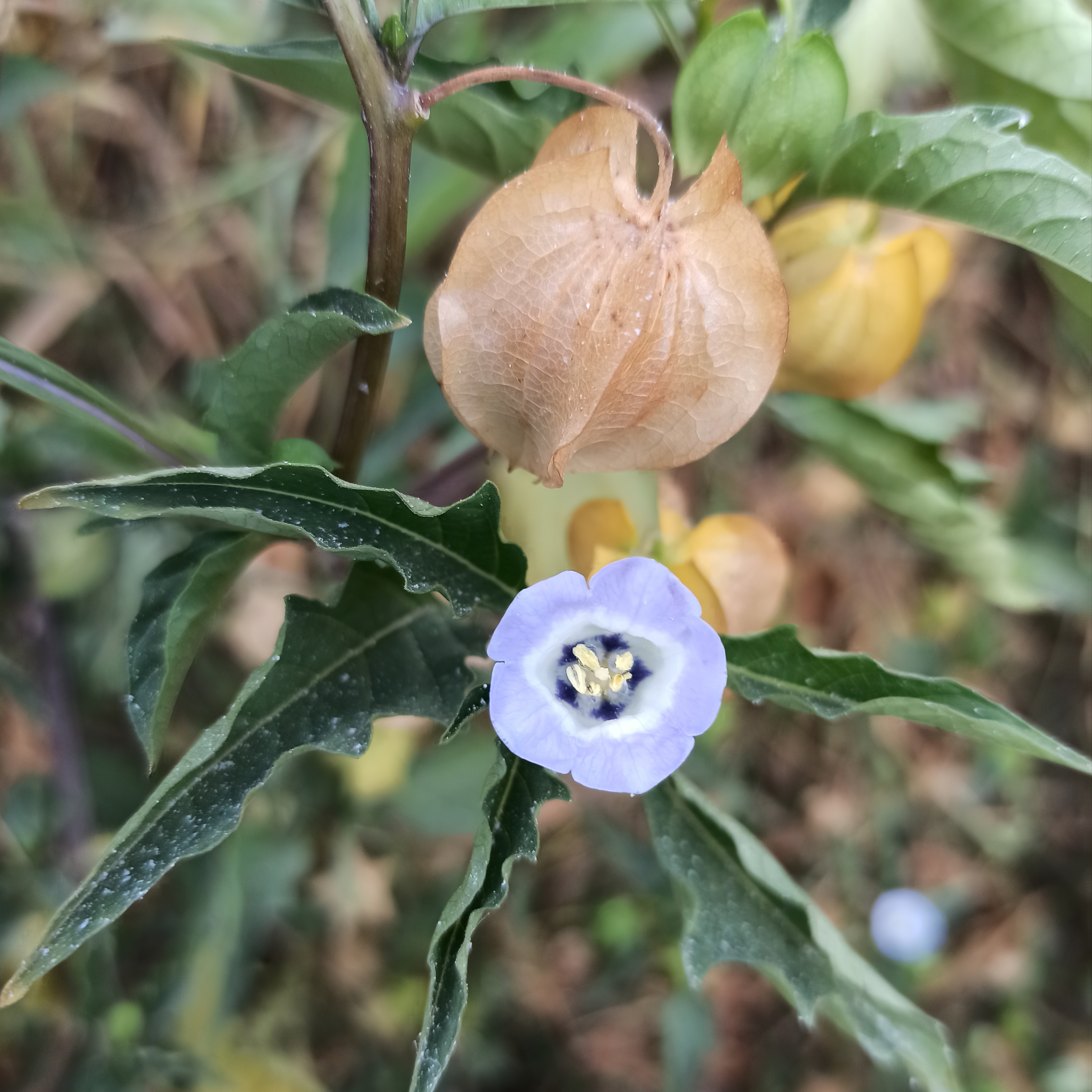

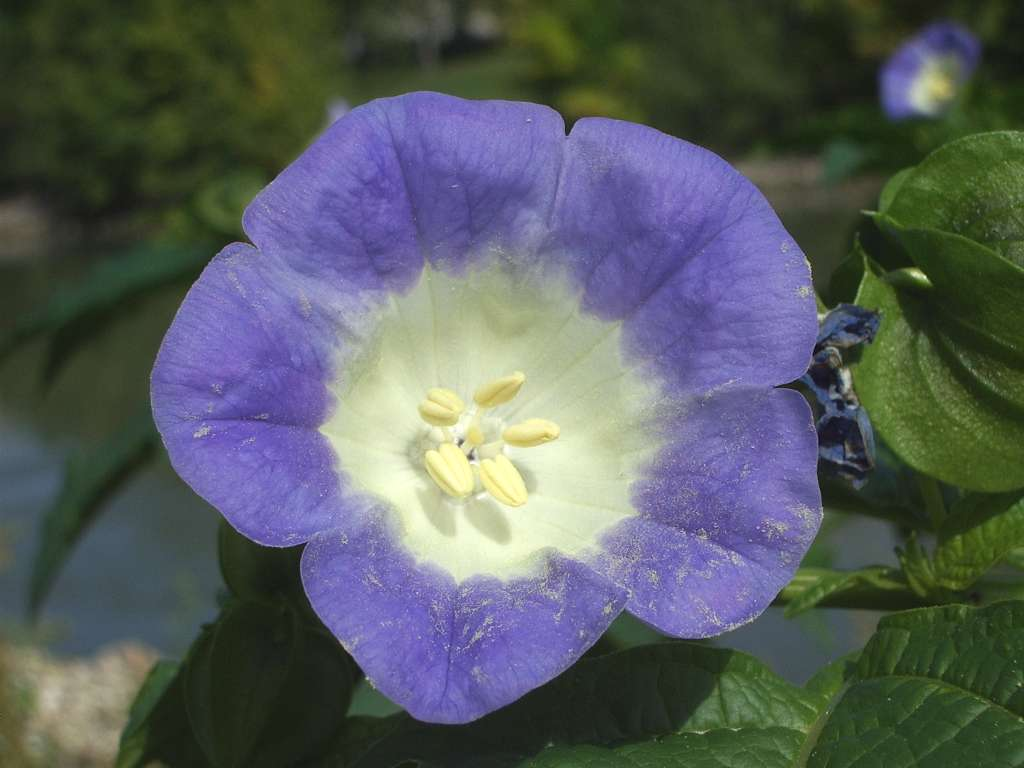

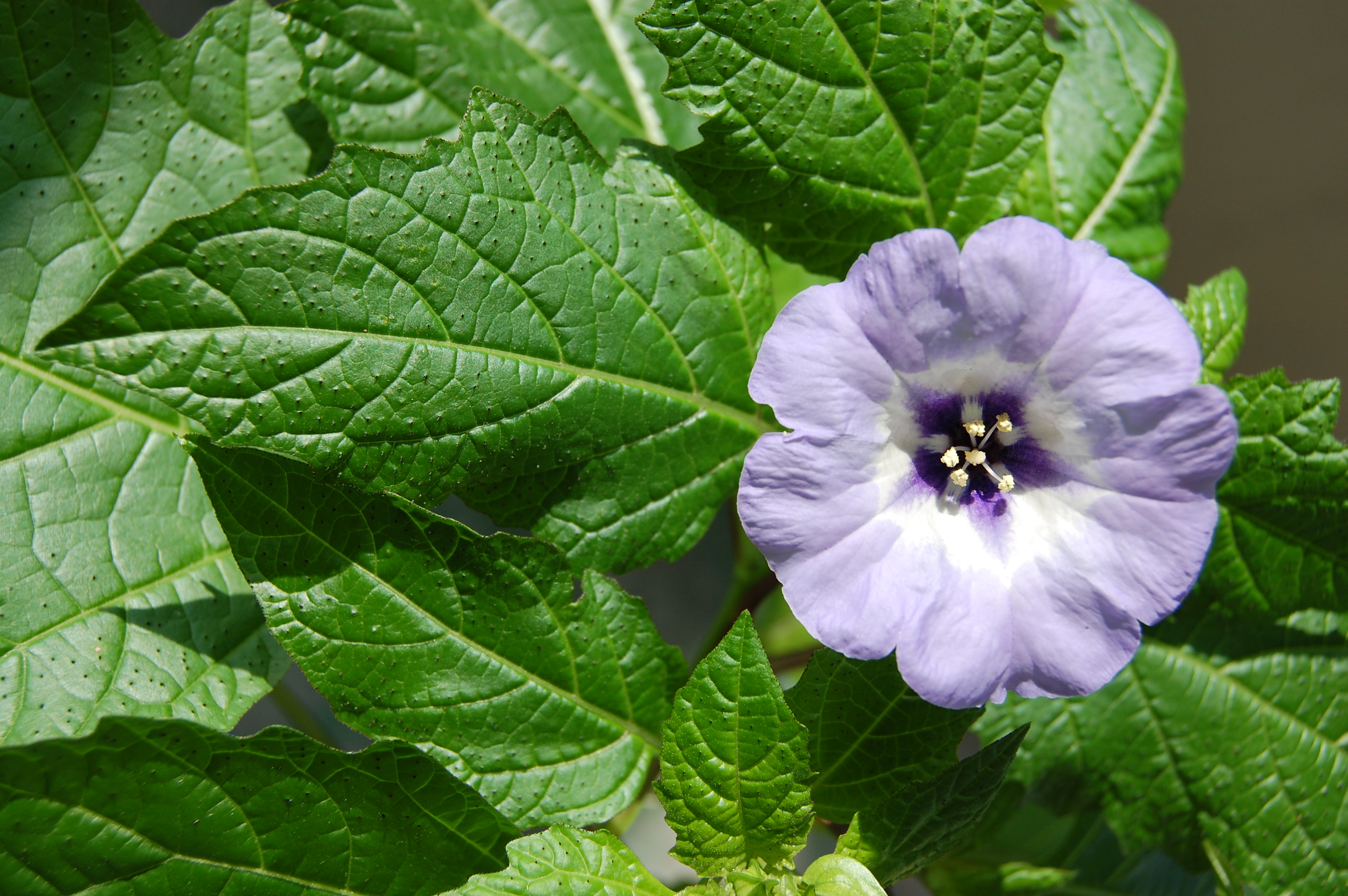

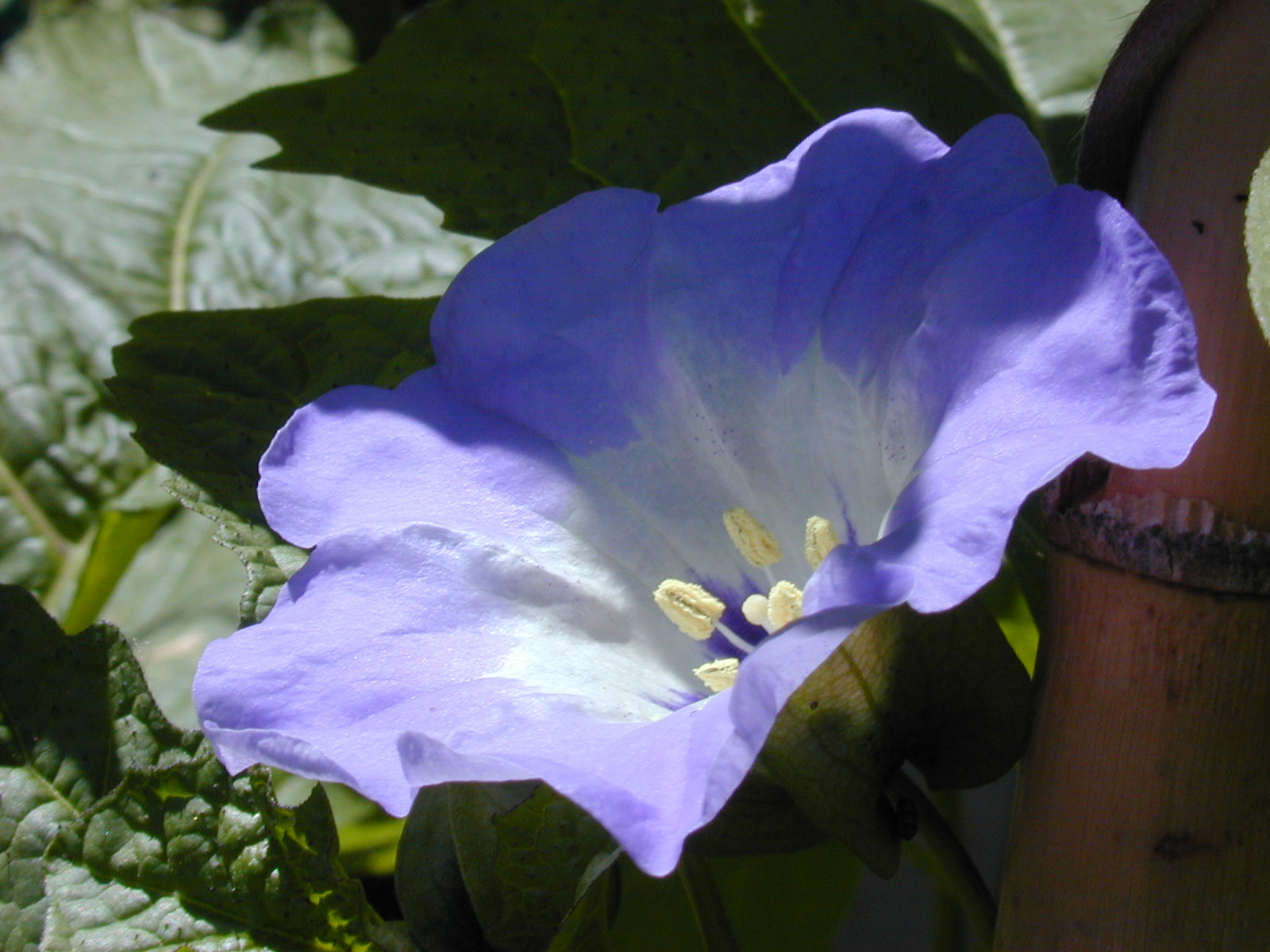

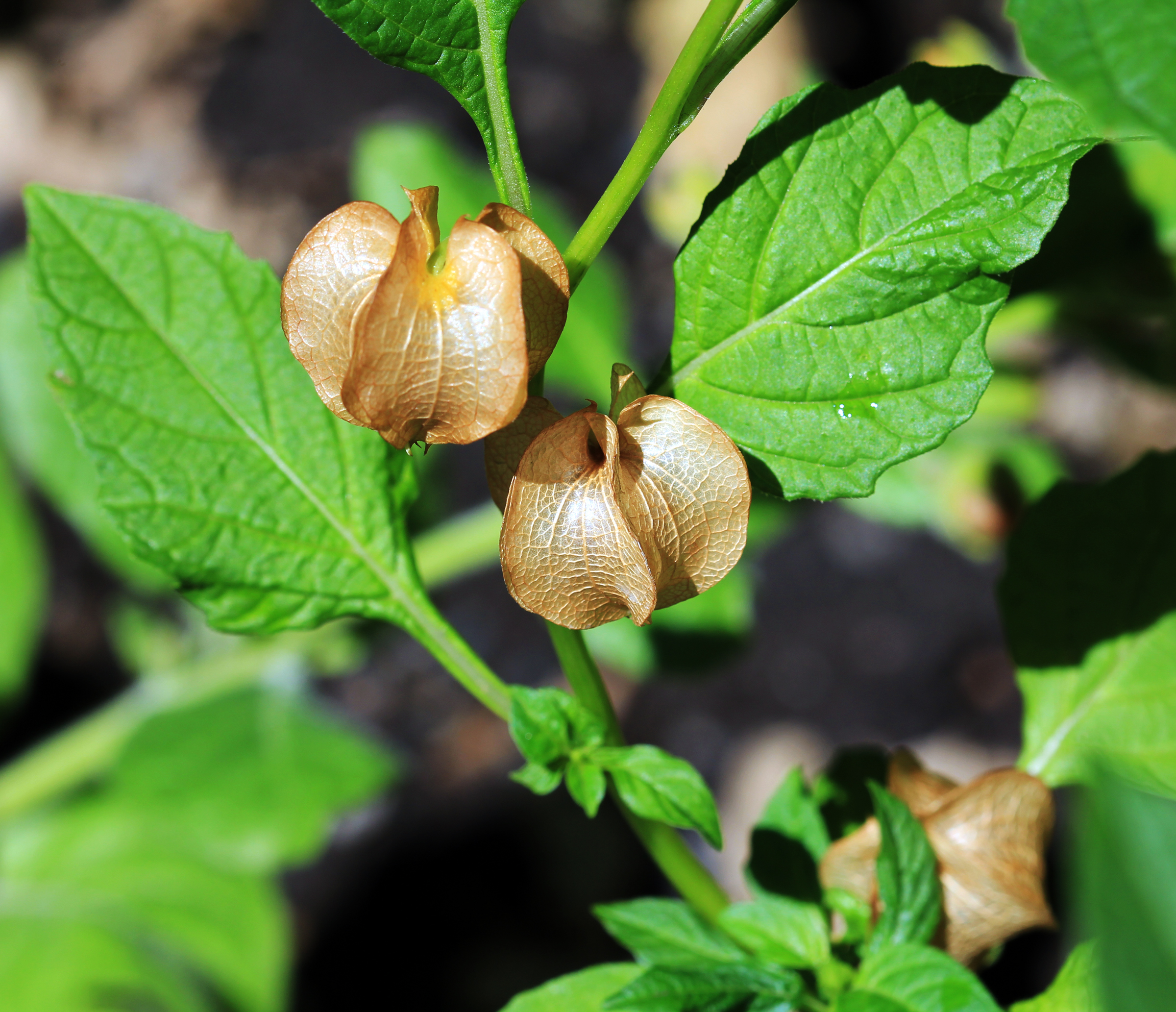

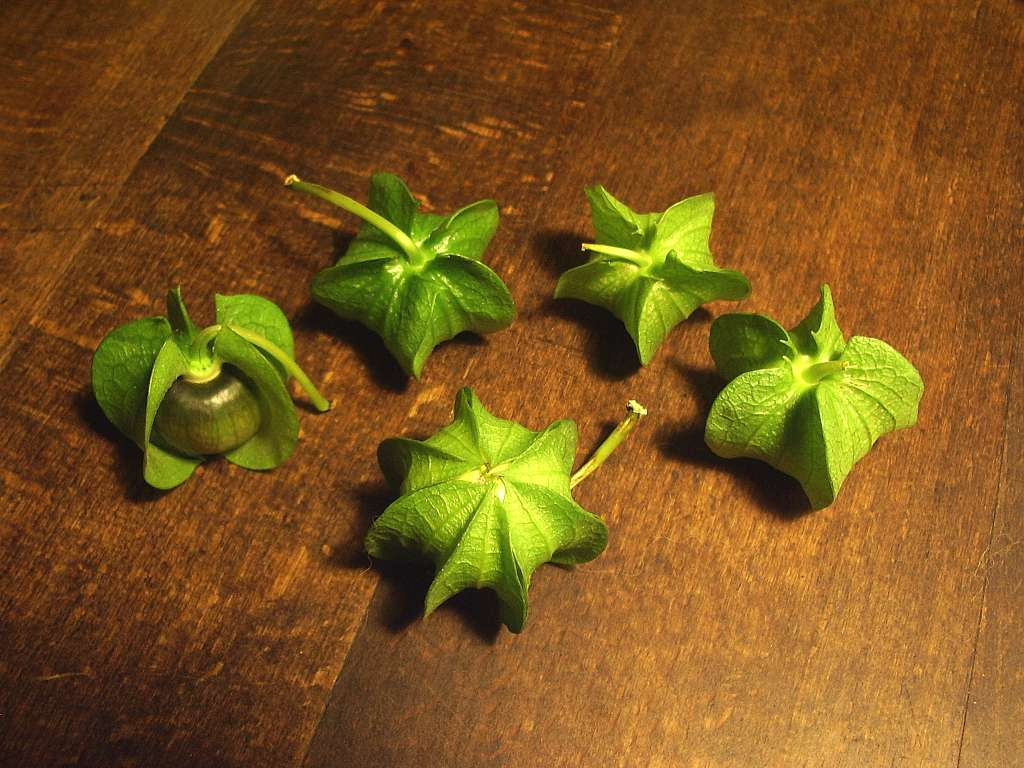

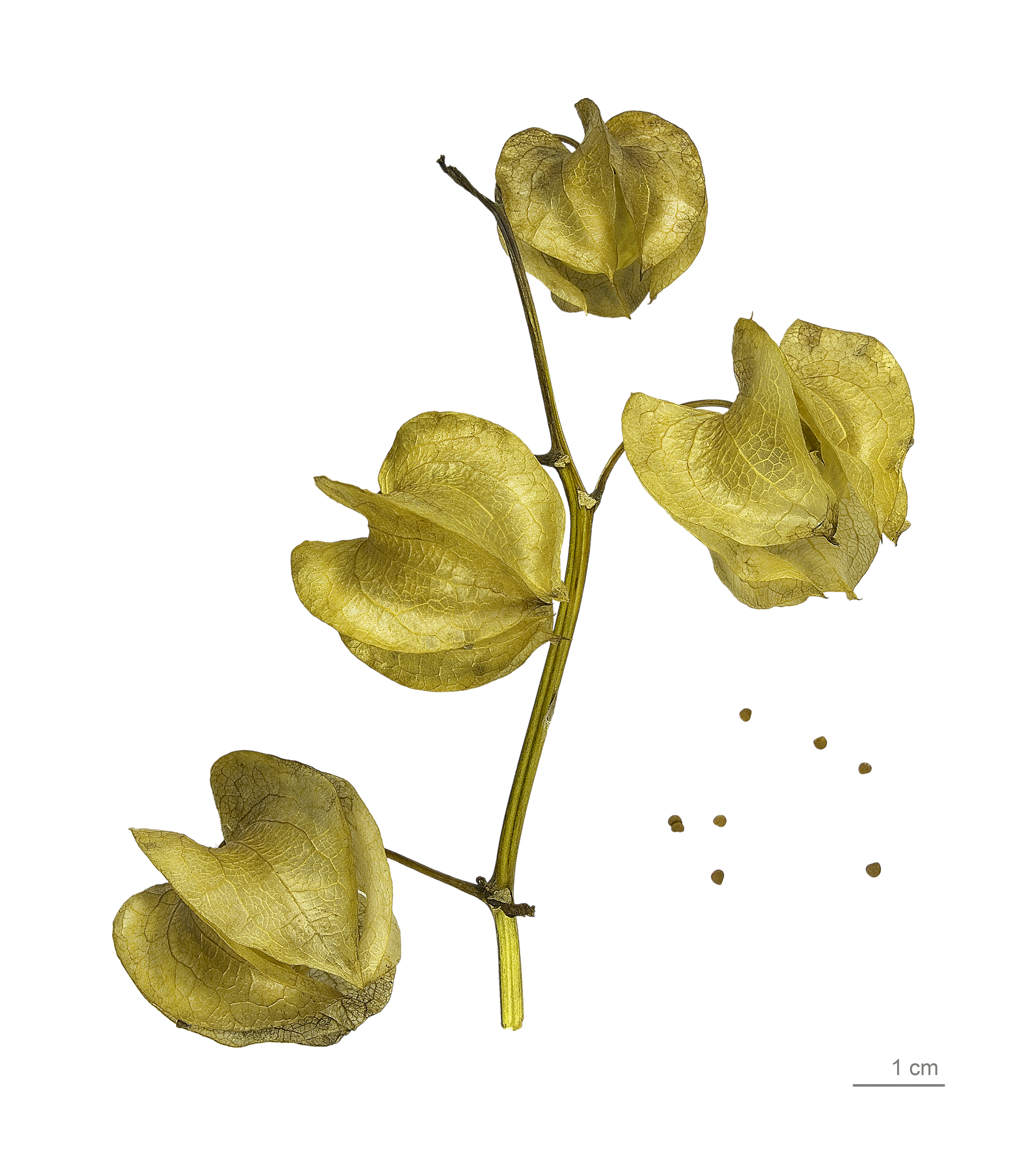

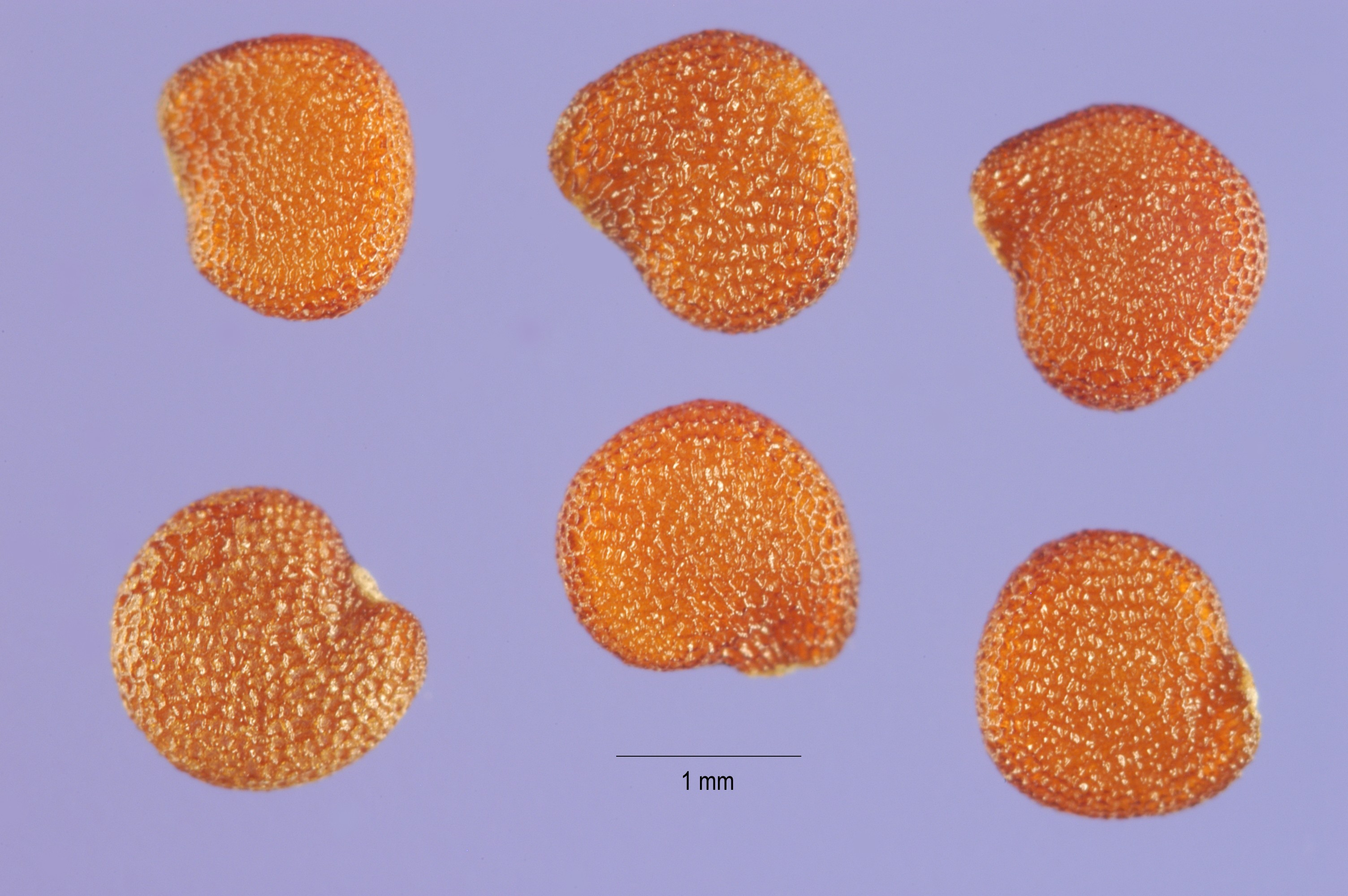
