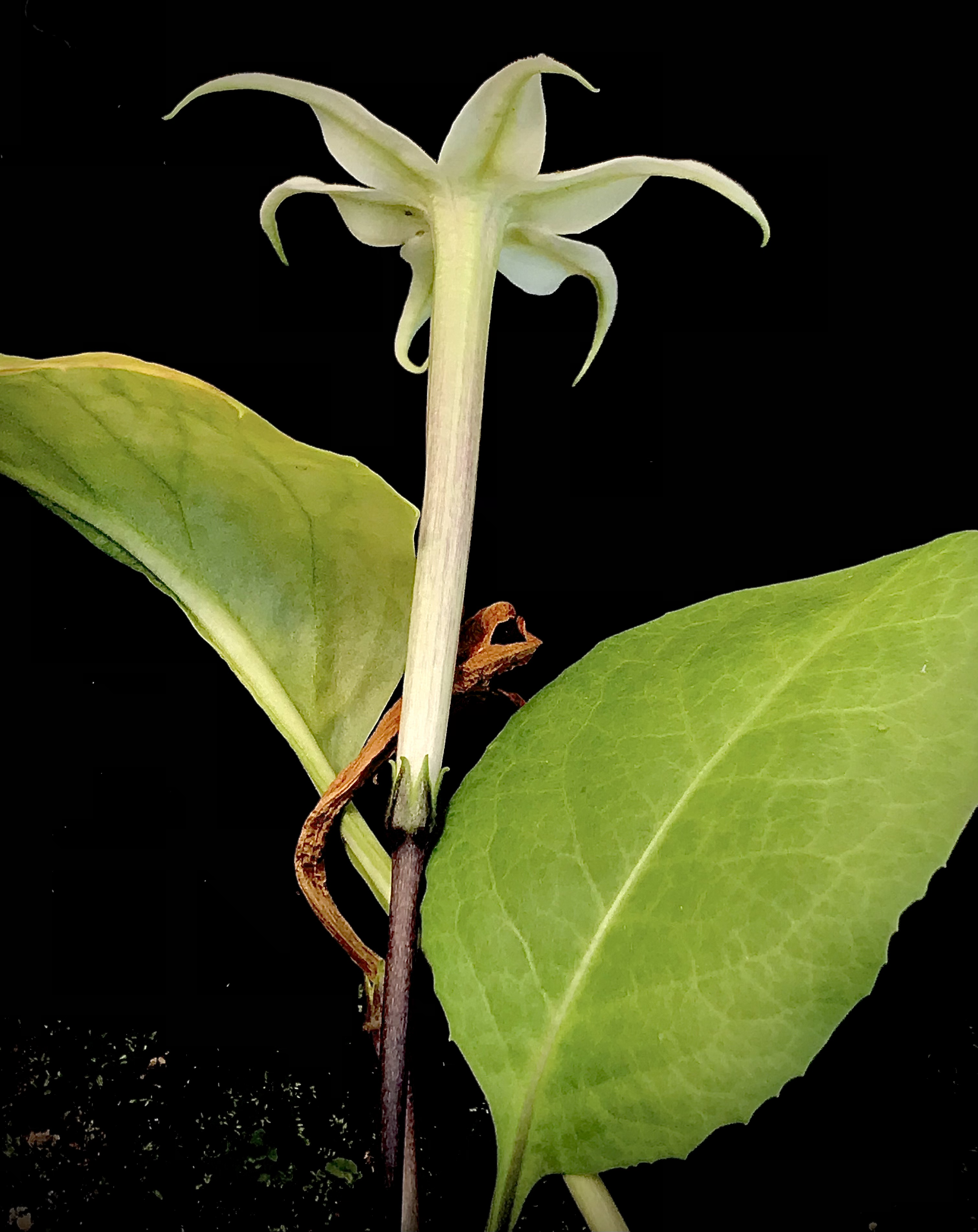
- Jaborosa integrifolia

Scientific classification
- Kingdom: Plantae
- Clade: Tracheophytes
- Clade: Angiosperms
- Clade: Eudicots
- Clade: Asterids
- Order: Solanales
- Family: Solanaceae
- Subfamily: Solanoideae
- Tribe: Jaboroseae; Miers
- Genus: Jaborosa; Juss.

Species
- About 23, see text

Synonyms
- Dolichosiphon Phil.; Dorystigma Miers; Himeranthus Endl.; Trechonaetes Miers

= Jaborosa =

Genus of flowering plants

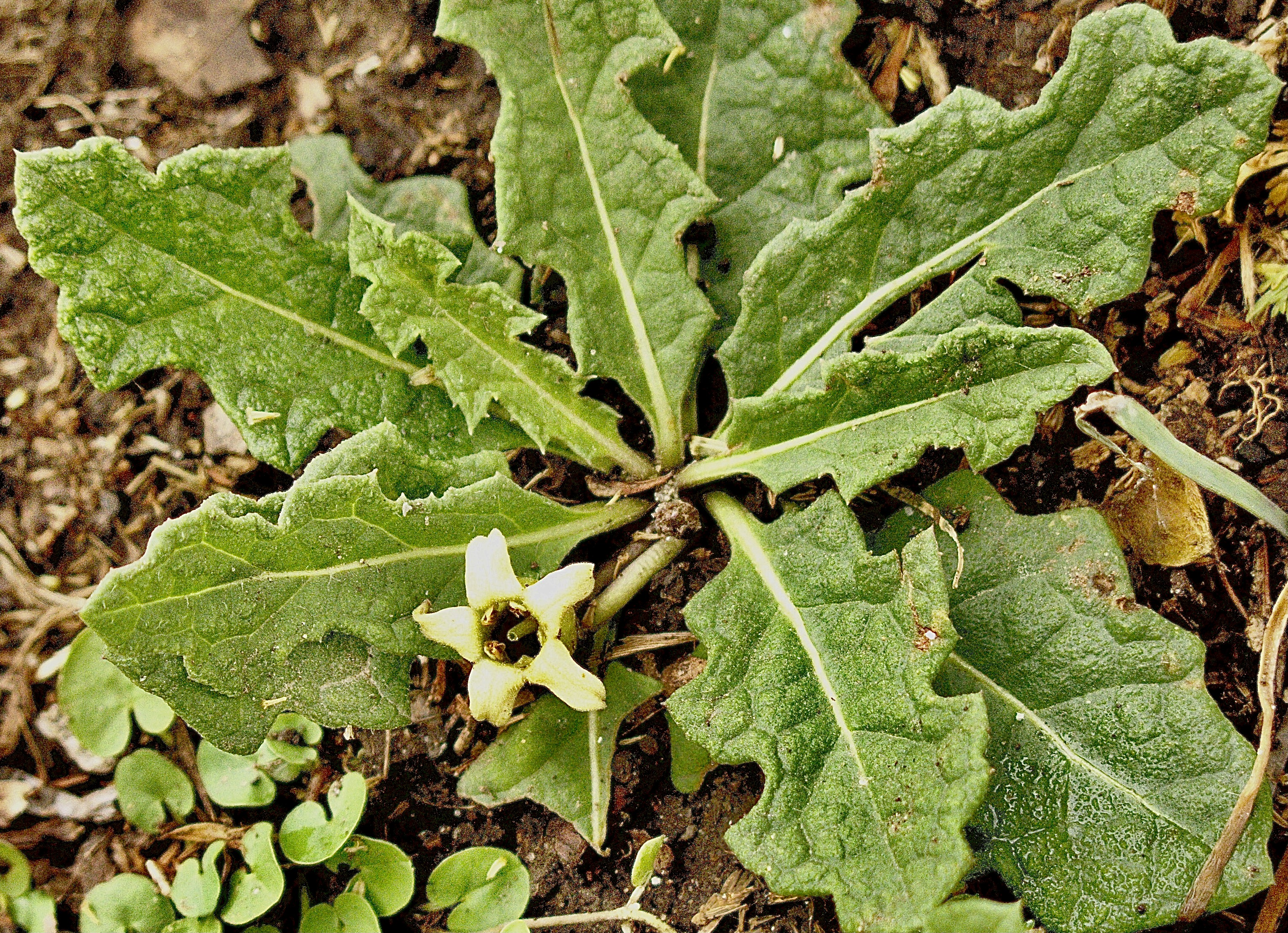
Jaborosa runcinata flowering in Northeastern Argentina

Jaborosa is a genus of flowering plants in the family Solanaceae, the nightshades. There are about 23 species, all native to South America, where they are distributed from Peru to Patagonia. Most occur in the Andes. Most can be found in Argentina and ten are endemic to the country.

== Description ==
Most Jaborosa are rhizomatous perennial herbs except J. bergii and J. sativa, which are annual or biennial.

== Ecology ==
Jaborosa rotacea is pollinated by flies, and J. runcinata is pollinated by moths. Sphingid moths feed on the nectar of J. integrifolia.

== Chemistry ==
Like plants in several other genera of the Solanaceae, many Jaborosa species contain steroid-derived compounds called withanolides. Many of the withanolides isolated from Jaborosa have been dubbed jaborosalactones. Some withanolides are phytotoxic, having effects on other plants such as inhibiting germination and radicle growth. Some have antifeedant effects, deterring insects such as mealworms (Tenebrio molitor), the Mediterranean fruit fly (Ceratitis capitata), and the African cotton leafworm (Spodoptera littoralis) from consuming the plant.

== Diversity ==
As of November 2026, Plants of the World Online accepted the following species:

- Jaborosa ameghinoi (Speg.) Macloskie
- Jaborosa araucana Phil.
- Jaborosa bergii Hieron.
- Jaborosa cabrerae Barboza
- Jaborosa caulescens Gillies & Hook.
- Jaborosa chubutensis Barboza & Hunz.
- Jaborosa integrifolia Lam.
- Jaborosa kurtzii Hunz. & Barboza
- Jaborosa laciniata (Miers) Hunz. & Barboza
- Jaborosa lanigera (Phil.) Hunz. & Barboza
- Jaborosa leucotricha (Speg.) Hunz.
- Jaborosa magellanica Phil.
- Jaborosa odonelliana Hunz.
- Jaborosa oxipetala Speg.
- Jaborosa parviflora (Phil.) Hunz. & Barboza
- Jaborosa pinnata Phil.
- Jaborosa reflexa Phil.
- Jaborosa riojana Hunz. & Barboza
- Jaborosa rotacea (Lillo) Hunz. & Barboza
- Jaborosa runcinata Lam.
- Jaborosa sativa (Miers) Hunz. & Barboza
- Jaborosa squarrosa (Miers) Hunz. & Barboza
- Jaborosa volkmannii (Phil.) Reiche
