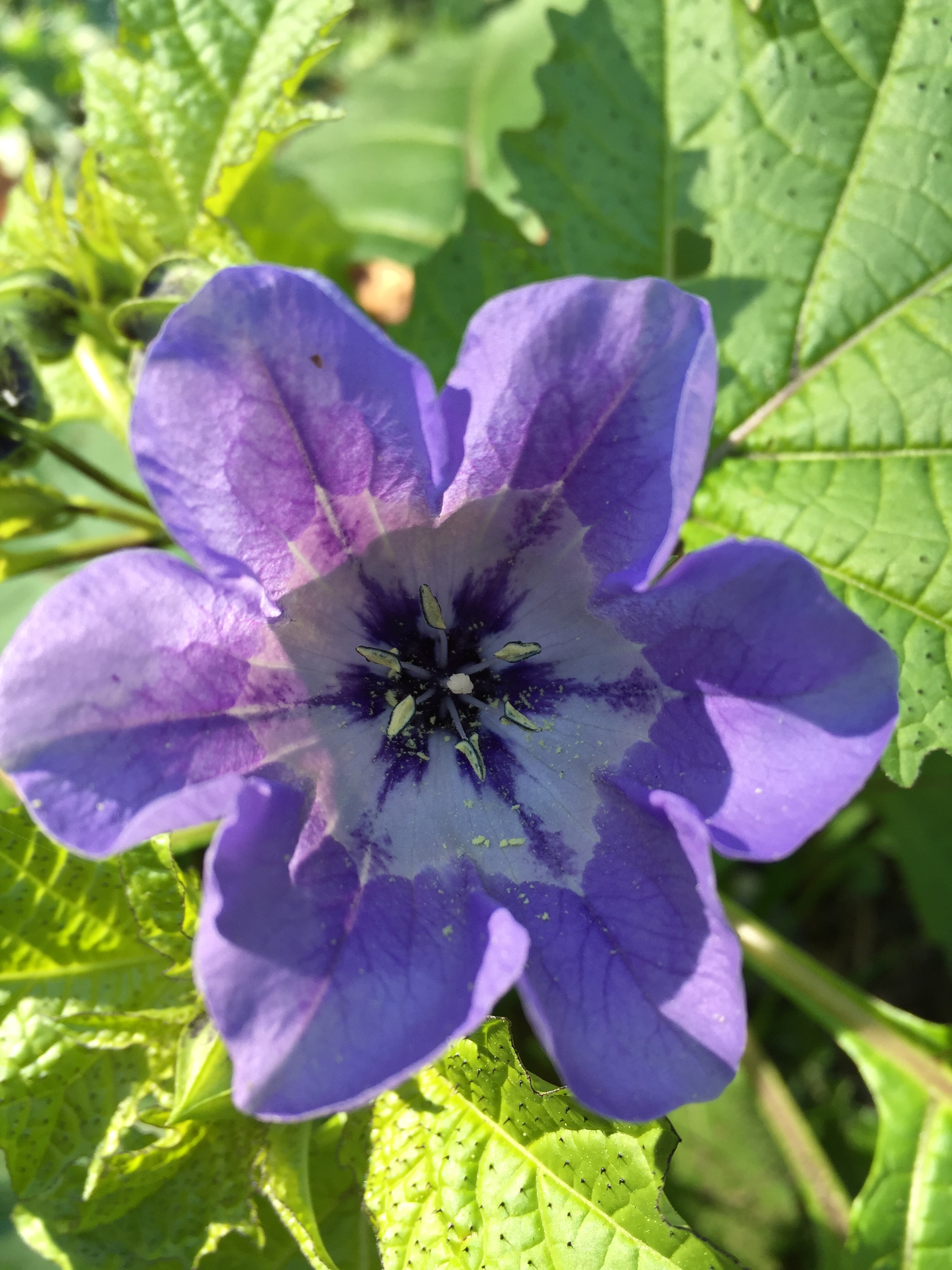
- Nicandra physalodes

Scientific classification
- Kingdom: Plantae
- Clade: Tracheophytes
- Clade: Angiosperms
- Clade: Eudicots
- Clade: Asterids
- Order: Solanales
- Family: Solanaceae
- Subfamily: Solanoideae
- Tribe: Nicandreae
- Genus: Nicandra; Adans.

Synonyms
- Calydermos Ruiz & Pav.

= Nicandra =

Genus of flowering plants

Nicandra is a genus of flowering plant in the family Solanaceae, native to western South America. It was first described by Michel Adanson in 1763. The genus is named for Greek poet Nicander of Colophon, who wrote about plants – notably in his poem Alexipharmaca, which treats of poisons and their antidotes.

As of March 2019, Plants of the World Online accepted three species:

- Nicandra john-tyleriana S.Leiva & Pereyra
- Nicandra physalodes (L.) Gaertn.
- Nicandra yacheriana S.Leiva

From 1763 until 2007, when Nicandra john-tyleriana was described, the only species in the genus was Nicandra physalodes. A third species, Nicandra yacheriana, was described in 2010.
