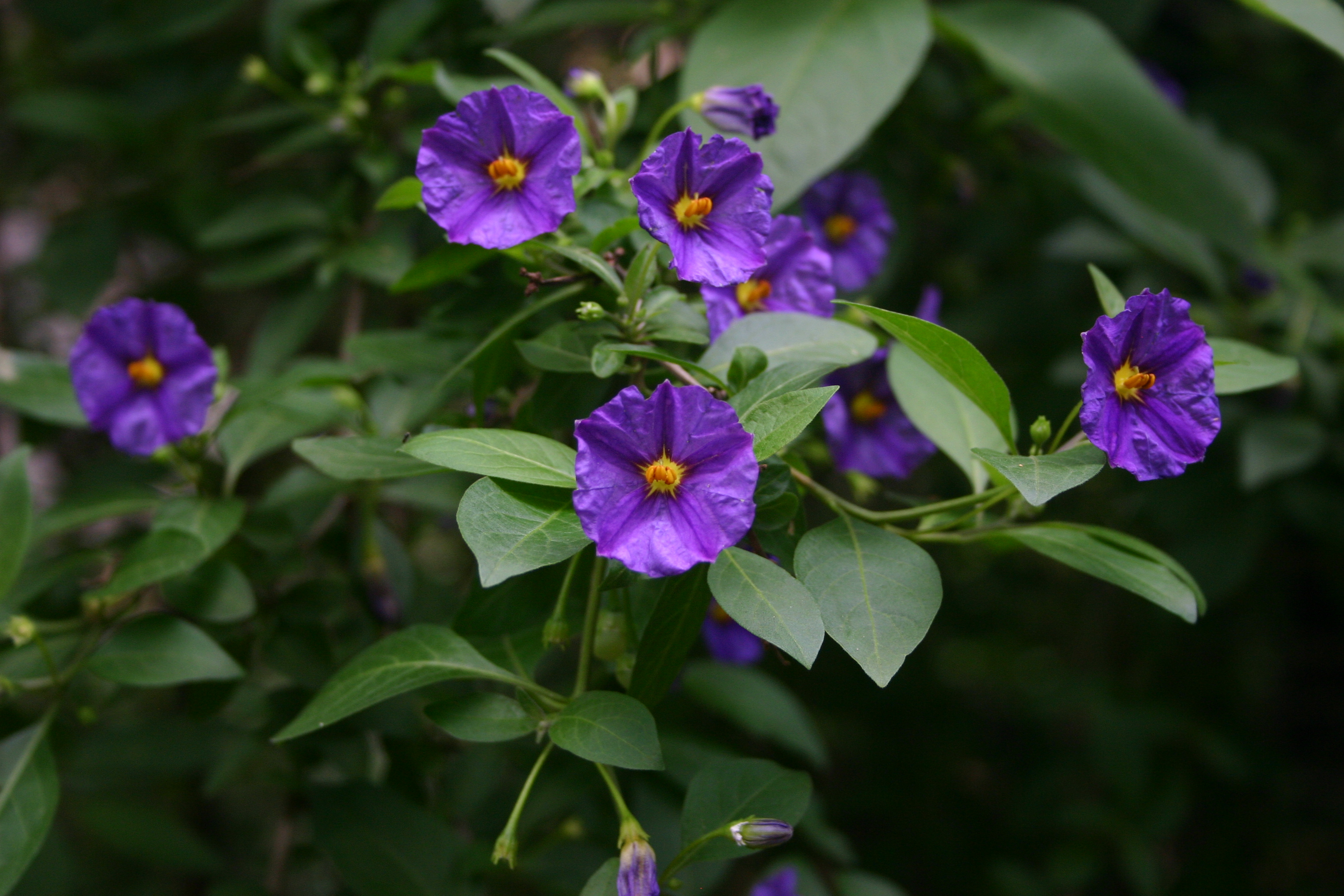

Scientific classification
- Kingdom: Plantae
- Clade: Embryophytes
- Clade: Tracheophytes
- Clade: Spermatophytes
- Clade: Angiosperms
- Clade: Eudicots
- Clade: Asterids
- Order: Solanales
- Family: Solanaceae
- Genus: Lycianthes
- Species: L. rantonnetii

Binomial name
- Lycianthes rantonnetii (Carrière) Bitter

Synonyms
- Solanum rantonnei orth. var. Carrière; Solanum rantonnetii Carrière

= Lycianthes rantonnetii =

Species of flowering plant

Lycianthes rantonnetii, the blue potato bush or Paraguay nightshade, is a species of flowering plant in the nightshade family Solanaceae, native to South America. Though related to food plants like the potato and tomato, all parts of the plant are considered toxic to humans.

== Description ==
Growing to about 6 ft (1.8 m) tall and broad, it is a rounded evergreen shrub with a somewhat lax, sprawling habit. The branches are slender and diverge sharply from the nodes. Internodes are approximately 5 centimetres (2.0 in) long. Young twigs are sparsely pubescent, becoming glabrous with age. The indumentum consists predominantly of simple trichomes, with only a small proportion of branched trichomes. The leaves are thin, entire and ovate to elliptic in shape, with an acute to acuminate apex and occasionally a slightly undulate margin. They are borne on short petioles and are sparsely pubescent. Mature leaves are typically 5 to 7 centimetres (2.0 to 2.8 in) long and 3 to 4 centimetres (1.2 to 1.6 in) wide, although some may reach nearly twice these dimensions.

Native to Argentina, Bolivia, Brazil, and Paraguay, the species is a fast-growing shrub that is deciduous in cooler climates but remains evergreen in warmer regions. It typically flowers from early spring to autumn in temperate areas, although in frost-free climates it may bloom throughout the year, with peak flowering occurring during summer.

=== Flowers ===
A profusion of trumpet-shaped, bright blue-purple flowers with a prominent yellow eye appear in summer, followed by red berries. The bisexual flowers are borne terminally or in the leaf axils, either solitary or in clusters of up to seven. They are supported by slender pedicels 2 to 4 centimetres (0.8 to 1.6 in) long. The cup-shaped calyx is up to 5 millimetres (0.20 in) long and divided into one to five narrow, pointed lobes of similar length, alternating with one to five small swellings along the calyx rim. The wheel-shaped sympetalous corolla is deep blue to violet with a conspicuous yellow centre, glabrous, and 2 to 3 centimetres (0.8 to 1.2 in) in diameter, with broad, undulate lobes. The five stamens have unequal, slightly curved filaments 1 to 3 millimetres (0.04 to 0.12 in) long, which are fused at the base and finely hairy on the inner surface. The robust anthers measure 2 to 4 millimetres (0.08 to 0.16 in) in length and dehisce through large terminal pores. Pollen grains are 17 to 23 micrometres in diameter. The glabrous style curves above the anthers, and the superior ovary is two-chambered.

=== Fruit ===
The fruit is a smooth, yellow to orange berry that is ellipsoid to nearly spherical and 20 to 35 millimetres (0.8 to 1.4 in) in diameter. It retains the persistent calyx and contains numerous seeds together with more than 25 sclerosomes. Although the fruit is attractive in appearance, it may be poisonous and is therefore not recommended for consumption.

== Taxonomy ==
The species is named for Barthélémy Victor Rantonnet, a 19th-century French horticulturalist. Lycianthes rantonnetii has previously been placed in Solanum, a huge genus which has recently been the subject of major investigation, with species being transferred to and from several different genera. There are many rare and little-known species whose true placement has yet to be determined.

== Cultivation ==
It is widely cultivated and may be hardy in mild or coastal areas. Alternatively it can be grown in a container and brought under cover in winter. It requires a sheltered location in full sun. It has been given the Royal Horticultural Society's Award of Garden Merit. The plant is vulnerable to pests such as aphids, caterpillars, and thrips.

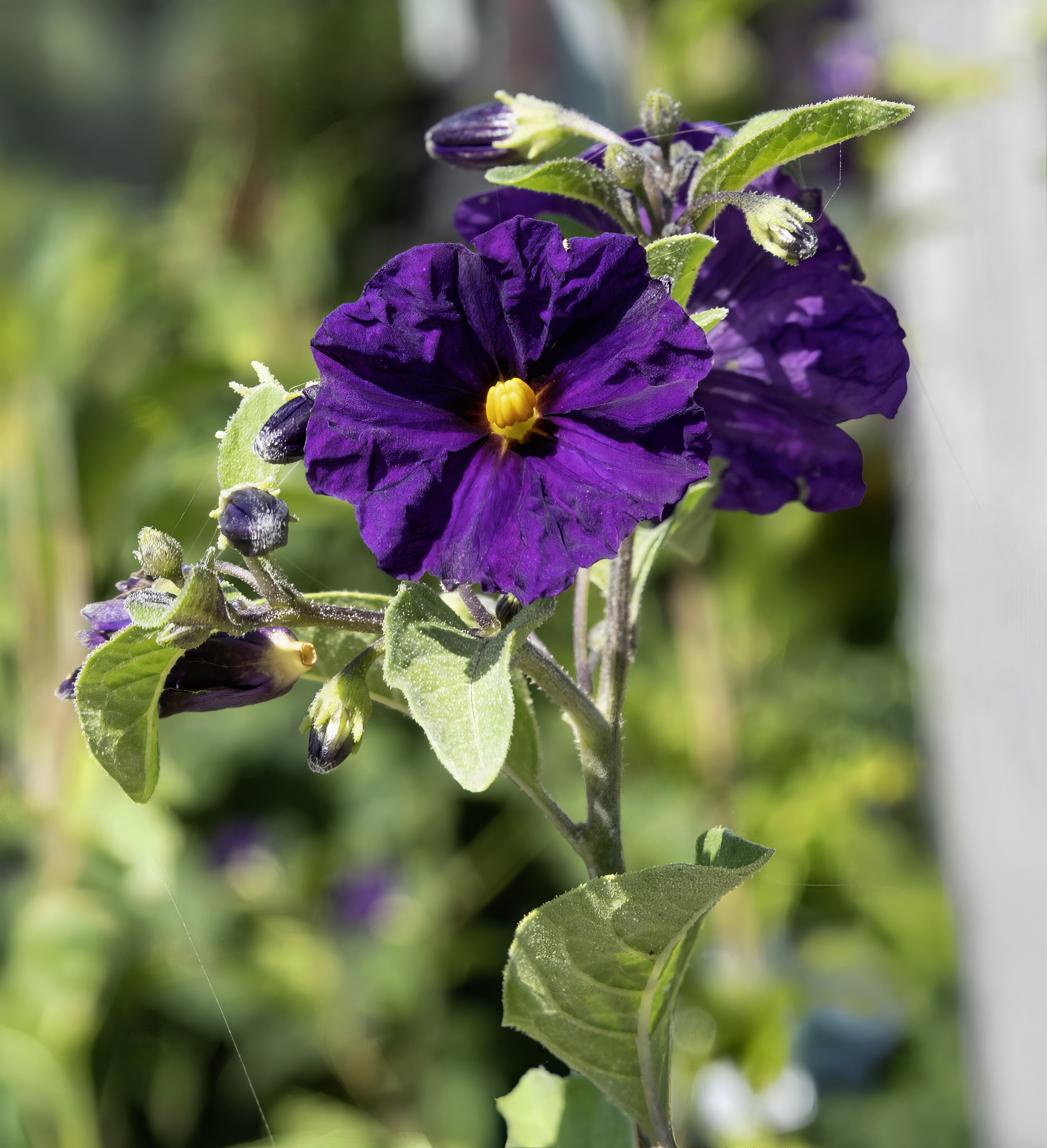
Lycianthes rantonnetii 'royal robe'

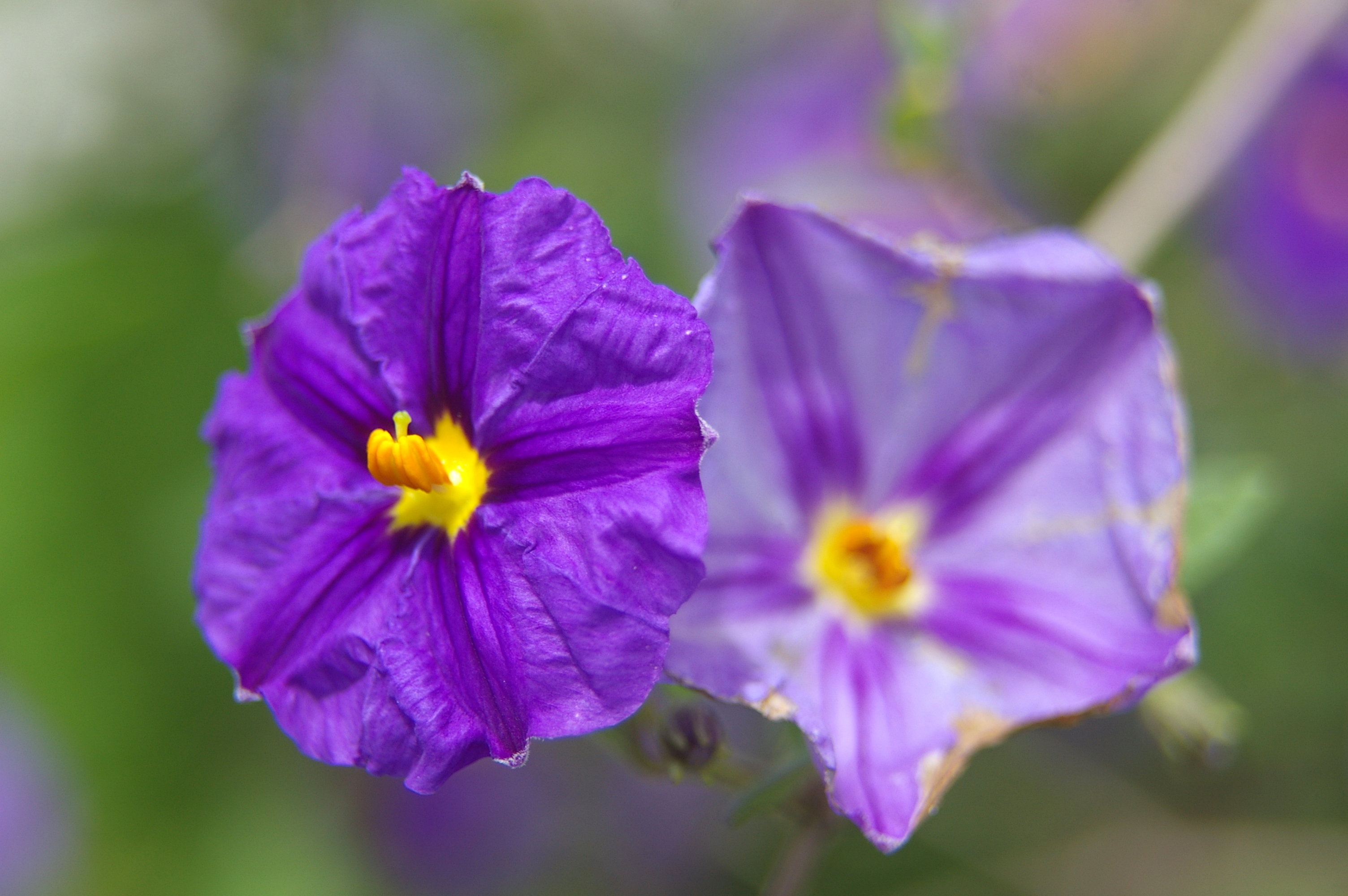

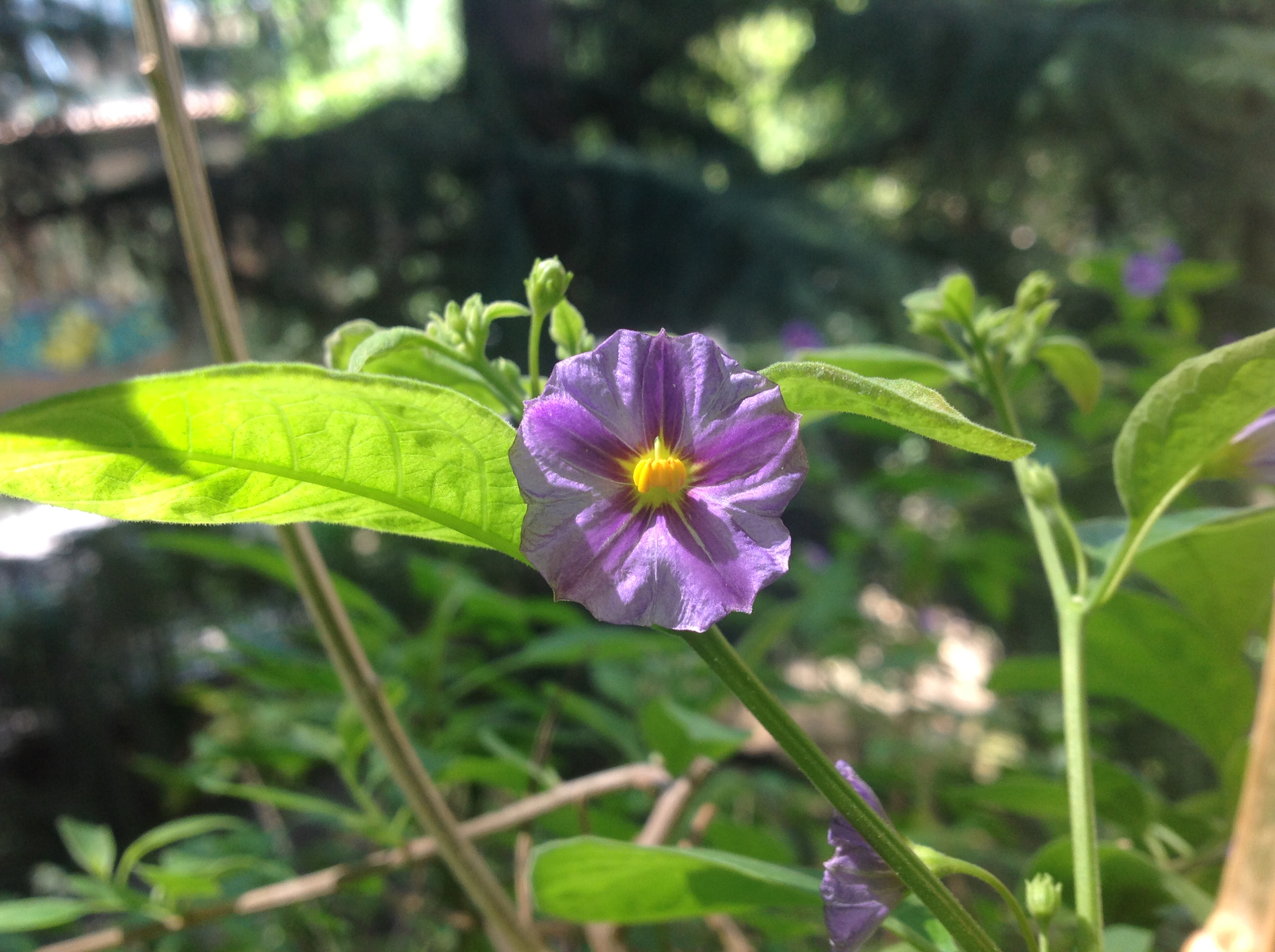
