= Lycianthes peduncularis =

- Lycianthes peduncularis in habitat

Scientific classification
- Kingdom: Plantae
- Clade: Tracheophytes
- Clade: Angiosperms
- Clade: Eudicots
- Clade: Asterids
- Order: Solanales
- Family: Solanaceae
- Genus: Lycianthes
- Species: L. peduncularis

Binomial name
- Lycianthes peduncularis (Schltdl.) Bitter

Synonyms
- Solanum pedunculare Schltdl.

Species of flowering plant

Flower from front

Flower from behind showing 10-lobed calyx

Leafy stem reclining on forest floor

Hairy stem

Lycianthes peduncularis, with no commonly used English name, is a herbaceous plant which grows as a perennial. Native only to Mexico, it belongs to the family Solanaceae.

== Description ==
These key features distinguish Lycianthes peduncularis from similar species:

- Arising from large root tubers which gradually diminish in width at each end, stems lie on the ground or lean onto it forming plants up to 25 cm (10 in) tall and twice that in width. The plant's green parts are covered with white hairs, or trichomes, up to 1.5 mm (1/16 in) long; these usually are unbranched and lie close to the plant surface.
- Larger leaves usually have poorly defined petioles bearing blades of various shapes narrowing at both ends; they are up to 14 cm (5 1/2 in) long and half as wide.
- Flowers arise singly on peduncles up to 11.5 cm (4 1/2 in) tall, growing longer in fruit. Hairy calyces bear 10 fingerlike appendages up to 6 mm (1/4 in) long, though often much shorter. Corollas, opening very early in the morning and closing around mid-day, are roundish not divided into distinct petals, white to pale lilac, and are up to 2.5 cm (1 in) long. Veins on the corolla's back side may show some greenness, and are somewhat hairy. Stamens have filaments of unequal length bearing slender anthers which are sweet-scented and up to 6.5 mm (1/4 in) long; these disperse their pollen through pores or slits at their tips. Extending beyond the anthers, the ovary's style, usually curved, is up 12 mm (1/2 in) long.
- The juicy, berry-type fruit is round to egg-shaped, to 26 mm (1 in) in diameter. It is green with purple or black lines turning yellowish with age. In fruit the expanded calyx remains, the 10 appendages curved backwards. A fruit may contain well over a hundred seeds.

== Distribution ==
Lycianthes peduncularis is endemic just to Mexico's central and southern states of Guanajuato, Hidalgo, México, Michoacán, Morelia, Oaxaca, Puebla, Querétaro and San Luis Potosí. Within that area, the distribution is somewhat discontinuous, restricted to limestone soils on the northern and southern sides of the Trans-Mexican Volcanic Belt, though within the Belt, and rarely on rhyolite, it appears in some eroded volcanic areas.

== Habitat ==
In central Mexico, Lycianthes peduncularis occurs on soils mostly derived from calcareous rocks, in dry scrub and grasslands. Images on this page show an individual in central Mexico on a steep, usually shaded slope encrusted with mosses atop which lay debris from fallen juniper branches and twigs. Often it grows near a drainage or in a wash or canyon, on an eroded floodplain, and sometimes within or beside agricultural fields or pastures, at 770–2,500 m (2,530–8,200 ft) in elevation.

== Conservation status ==
Lycianthes peduncularis is not listed on the IUCN Red List, but within Mexico specialists consider it to be a common species within its distribution area and a least-concern species.

== Uses by humans ==
=== In Gardening ===
Although Lycianthes peduncularis seldom is found in gardens, during the 1800s and early 1900s the species was widely cultivated in German botanical gardens. The German botanist Carl Albert Purpus took seeds from a half-ripe fruit found on a plant in Oaxaca, germinated them in Germany, and produced what he thought were very attractive plants. He wrote that it was easy to grow, but sensitive to overwatering and not frost tolerant. During cold months the plants should overwinter inside, and the tubers should be kept dry.

=== As food ===
In Mexico, Lycianthes peduncularis fruits are eaten.

=== In traditional ceremonies ===
Lycianthes peduncularis fruits are offered to the spirits during Mexico's Day of the Dead ceremonies.

== Taxonomy ==
in 1846 when Diederich Franz Leonhard von Schlechtendal formally described and named Lycianthes peduncularis, using the basionym Solanum pedunculare, he made this note: "Mineral del Monte frequens ad Omitlan, Velasco (C. Ehrenberg)." Mineral del Monte is a town and municipality of Mexico's state of Hidalgo. The species was frequent around nearby Omitlán de Juárez. Velasco refers to Hacienda de Velasco, a location in Omitlán de Juárez Municipality. C. A. Ehrenberg was a German merchant, botanist and plant collector who collected the material Schlechtendal described and named.

The concept of Lycianthes peduncularis has a confusing history, including that Schlechtendal's description, the protologue, does match the type material supplied by Ehrenberg. Schlechtendal himself seemed uncertain whether certain specimens were Lycianthes peduncularis or Lycianthes mozinoana. Critical specimens upon which the taxon was based may have been lost in the destruction of the Berlin herbarium during World War 2, but those specimens still may turn up someplace. In 2020, these considerations suggested that the original name Solanum peduculare may need to be retypified, but not at that time.

=== Phylogeny ===
Within the genus Lycianthes, based on traditional analysis methods, Lycianthes peduncularis belongs to the series Meizonodontae, which includes 8 species and 2 varieties. The other 7 species are: Lycianthes acapulcensis, Lycianthes ciliolata, Lycianthes dejecta, Lycianthes hintonii, Lycianthes mozinoana, Lycianthes rzedowskii, and Lycianthes starbuckii. All of these occur within the area from Mexico to central Costa Rica, and are perennial herbs producing solitary flowers, calyces with 10 appendages, and have round corollas. The chromosome number is x = 12.

In 2025, within the series Meizonodontae, molecular phylogenetic analysis using sequence analysis found that Lycianthes peduncularis is sister to L. dejecta. These two species are thought to have diverged relatively recently, and the variation and structure of both species is due to Pleistocene cycles of glaciation interacting with the presence of the Trans-Mexican Volcanic Belt.

=== Etymology ===
The genus name Lycianthes is based on the preexisting genus Lycium, and the Greek anthos, meaning "flower." Presumably this alludes to the resemblance of the spiny Lycianthes lycioides to species of Lycium, which often are thorny.

The species name peduncularis derives from botanical Latin, meaning "having a peduncle"; each flower of Lycianthes peduncularis does rise majestically atop a robust peduncle.
