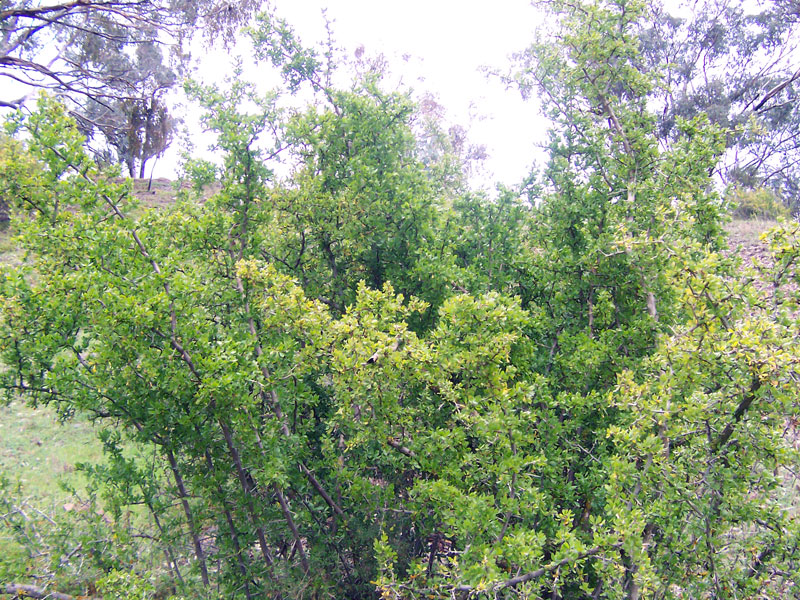
- African boxthorn (Lycium ferocissimum)

Scientific classification
- Kingdom: Plantae
- Clade: Tracheophytes
- Clade: Angiosperms
- Clade: Eudicots
- Clade: Asterids
- Order: Solanales
- Family: Solanaceae
- Subfamily: Solanoideae
- Tribe: Lycieae

Genera
- Lycium; Grabowskia

= Lycieae =

Tribe of flowering plants

Lycieae is a tribe of flowering plants in the subfamily Solanoideae of the family Solanaceae. It comprises two genera: Lycium and Grabowskia.
