= Barthélémy Victor Rantonnet =

French horticulturist and botanist

Barthélémy Victor Rantonnet (1797-1871), was a gardener, horticulturalist and French nurseryman, a pioneer in the acclimatisation of plants on Côte d'Azur. He worked in the garden that Jean-Baptiste Fihle de Sainte-Anne had created in Hyères (Var). He became interested in the acclimatisation of plants, and transformed the garden into a commercial plant nursery, named "Jardin Filhe" in honour of its former proprietor. He published, among other things, "Jardin d'acclimatation, Catalogue des végétaux exotiques". Solanum rantonnei was named in his honour and later synonymised with Lycianthes rantonnetii.

In 1883, Charles Huber bought Rantonnet's garden. Hyères became an important centre for the acclimatisation of palms and many residents created their own gardens of exotic plants : Jacques Nicolas Ernest Germain de Saint-Pierre (château Saint-Pierre des Horts), Alphonse Denis (château Denis), Gustave Bonnet (villa Marguerite) and Gustave Charles Ferdinand de Bonstetten (villa Mathilde).
