= Lycianthes rimbachii =

Conservation status
- Endangered (IUCN 3.1)

Scientific classification
- Kingdom: Plantae
- Clade: Tracheophytes
- Clade: Angiosperms
- Clade: Eudicots
- Clade: Asterids
- Order: Solanales
- Family: Solanaceae
- Genus: Lycianthes
- Species: L. rimbachii

Binomial name
- Lycianthes rimbachii Standl.

Species of flowering plant

Lycianthes rimbachii is a species of flowering plant in the family Solanaceae. It is a shrub endemic to Andean Ecuador.
