= Nonochton =

Classical Nahuatl name for a plant whose identity is uncertain

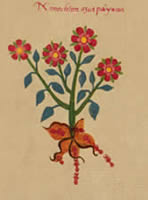
Illustration of nonochton from the Libellus de Medicinalibus Indorum Herbis (1552).

Nonochton is the Classical Nahuatl name for a plant whose identity is uncertain. Suggested plants include Portulaca, Pereskiopsis, and Lycianthes mociniana, a plant now called tlanochtle in the local variety of modern Nahuatl spoken by highland farmers that cultivate it for its fruit.

== Medicinal uses ==
In Aztec medicine, nonochton was used as an ingredient in a remedy for pain in the heart:

For him whose heart pains him or burns, take the plant nonochton that grows near an ants’ nest, gold, electrum, teo-xihuitl, chichiltic tapachtli and tetlahuitl, with the burned heart of a deer, and grind them up together in water; let him drink the liquor.

— Libellus de Medicinalibus Indorum Herbis (1552), translated by William Gates

== See also ==
- Aztec entheogenic complex
