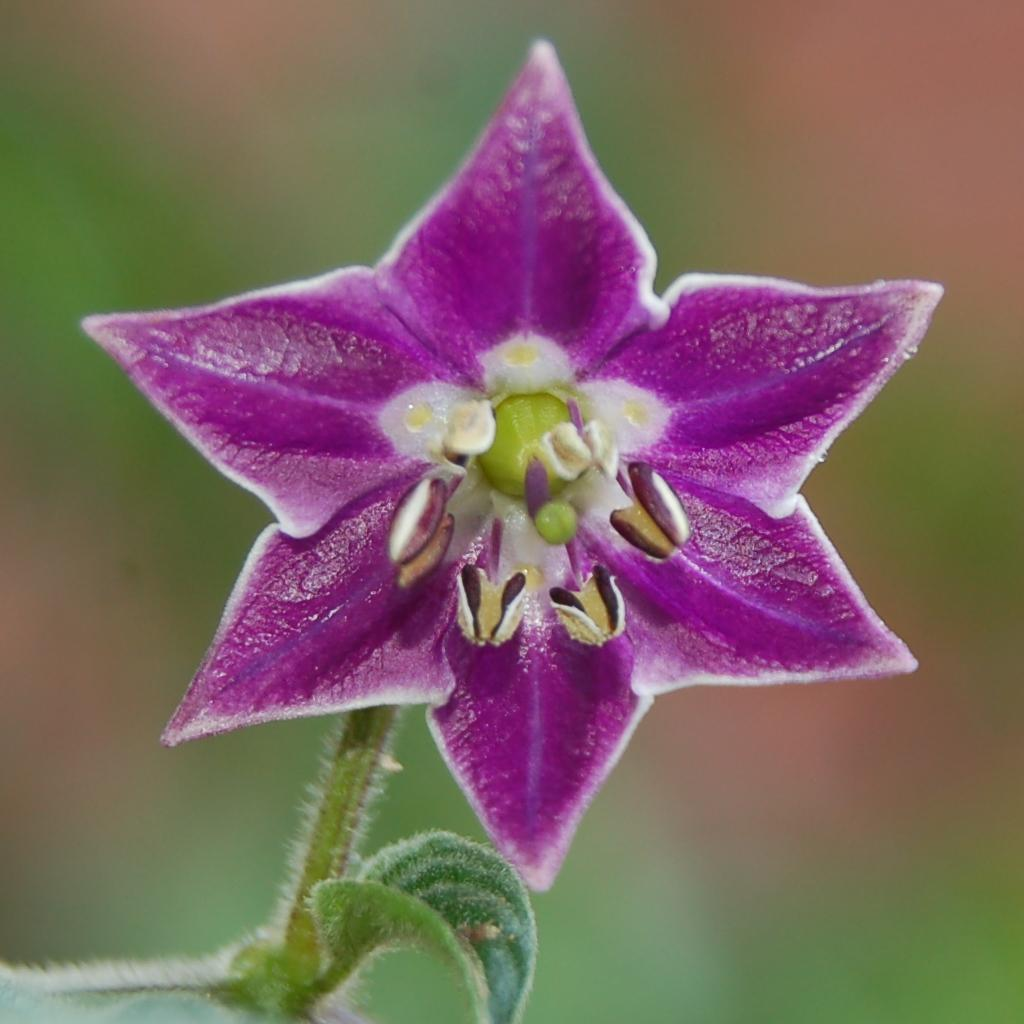
- Capsicum pubescens

Scientific classification
- Kingdom: Plantae
- Clade: Tracheophytes
- Clade: Angiosperms
- Clade: Eudicots
- Clade: Asterids
- Order: Solanales
- Family: Solanaceae
- Subfamily: Solanoideae
- Tribe: Capsiceae; Dumort. 1827

Genera
- Capsicum; Lycianthes

= Capsiceae =

Capsiceae Temporal range: Early Eocene to recent

Tribe of flowering plants

Capsiceae is a taxonomic tribe of bell peppers and related plants belonging to the Solanoideae subfamily within the family Solanaceae. The tribe was described by Barthélemy Charles Joseph Dumortier in 1827.

== Phylogenomes ==
Research from spacer data proved that the genera Lycianthes and Capsicum together form a highly supported clade that placed them in the tribe. Phylogenetic networks support placing the genera Capsicum and Lycanthes within a common bifurcating species tree.

The earliest fossils assigned to this tribe are from the Early Eocene of the Green River Formation in Colorado, and can be identified by their trademark calyces. This suggests that the Solanaceae may have originated in North America rather than South America as previously assumed, and were dispersed south during the Paleocene by fruit-eating birds.
