= Bingfen =

Chinese dessert

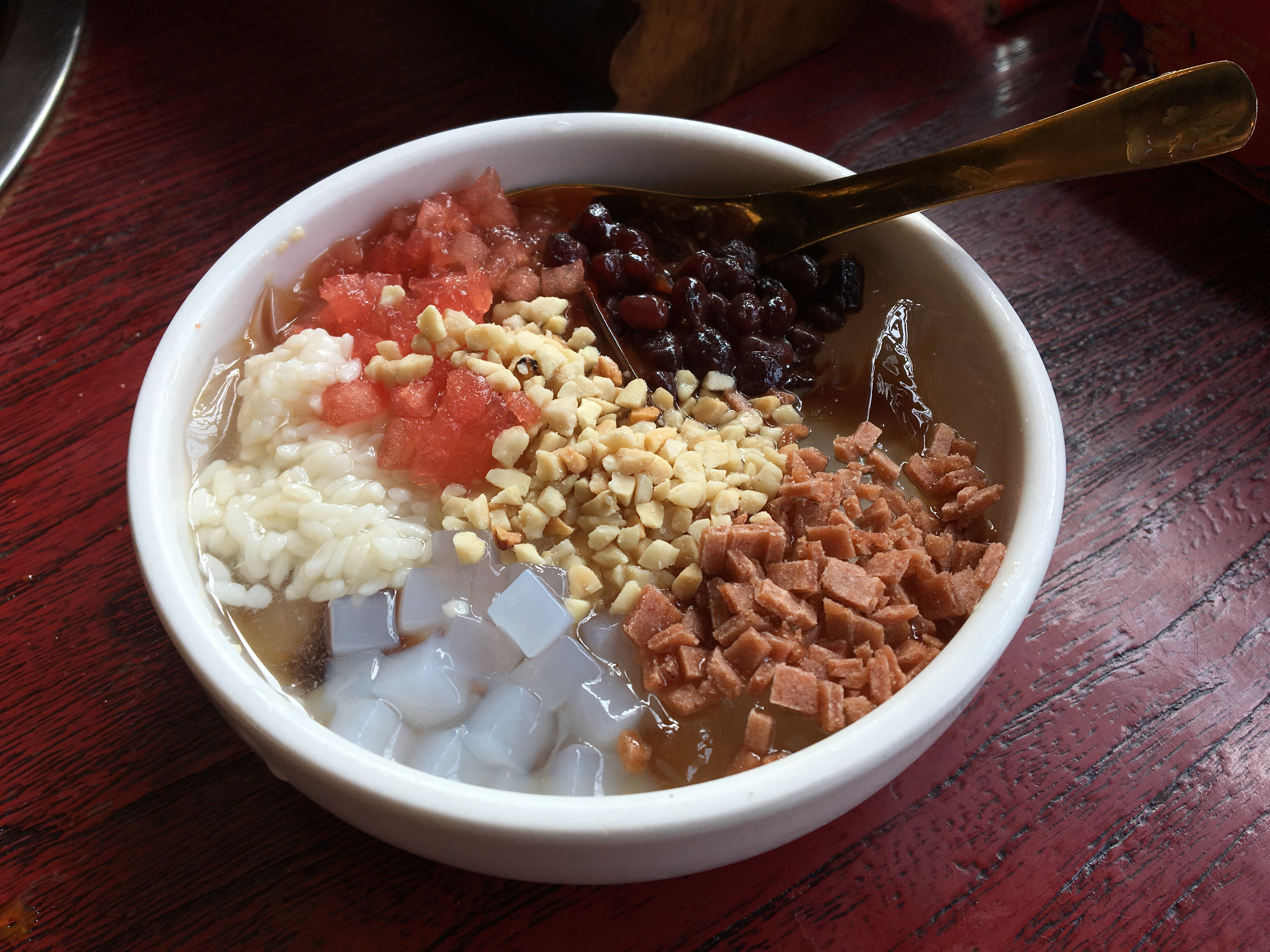
A bowl of bingfen

Bingfen (Chinese: 冰粉; pinyin: bīngfěn), also called ice jelly, is a Chinese dessert native to Southwest China in provinces such as Sichuan, Guizhou, and Yunnan. It is served as a bowl of iced transparent jelly, traditionally made from the seeds of the Nicandra physalodes plant. In modern times, bingfen can also be made from konjac root. The jelly can be topped with toppings like haw flakes and wolfberries. It is commonly sold in the summertime as a street food.

== See also ==
- Sichuan cuisine
- Aiyu jelly
- Climbing fig tofu
- List of Chinese desserts
- Chinese desserts
