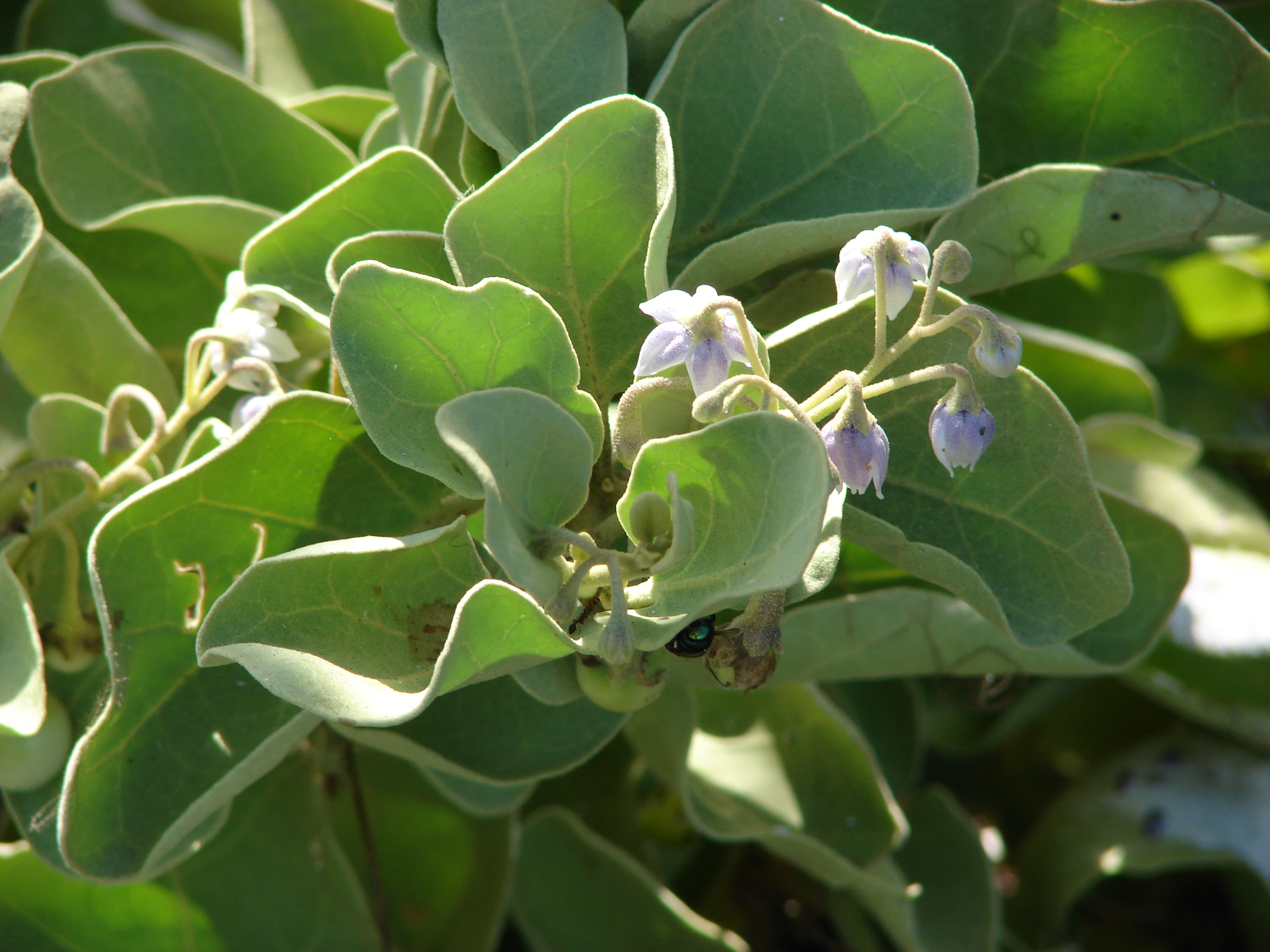
- Solanum nelsonii

Scientific classification
- Kingdom: Plantae
- Clade: Tracheophytes
- Clade: Angiosperms
- Clade: Eudicots
- Clade: Asterids
- Order: Solanales
- Family: Solanaceae
- Subfamily: Solanoideae; Kostel.

Tribes
- Capsiceae; Datureae; Hyoscyameae; Jaboroseae; Juanulloeae; Lycieae; Mandragoreae; Nicandreae; Nolaneae; Physaleae; Solandreae; Solaneae

= Solanoideae =

Solanoideae Temporal range: Eocene–present

Subfamily of flowering plants

Solanoideae is a subfamily of the flowering plant family Solanaceae, and is sister to the subfamily Nicotianoideae. Within Solanaceae, Solanoideae contains some of the most economically important genera and species, such as the tomato (Solanum lycopersicum), potato (Solanum tuberosum), eggplant or aubergine (Solanum melongena), chili and bell peppers (Capsicum), mandrakes (Mandragora), and jimson weeds (Datura).

This subfamily consists of several well-established tribes: Capsiceae, Datureae, Hyoscyameae, Juanulloeae, Lycieae, Nicandreae, Nolaneae, Physaleae, Solandreae, and Solaneae. The subfamily also contains the contended tribes Mandragoreae and Jaboroseae.

== Tribal relationships ==
The relationship between the tribes has recently been well described. Nicandreae is sister to the other 9 (or by some counts 11) tribes. Datureae lies sister to Nicandreae, Physaleae, Capsiceae, and Solaneae. Solaneae + (Physaleae + Capsiceae) form a well-supported monophyletic group, but the exact branching within the clade remains unclear.
