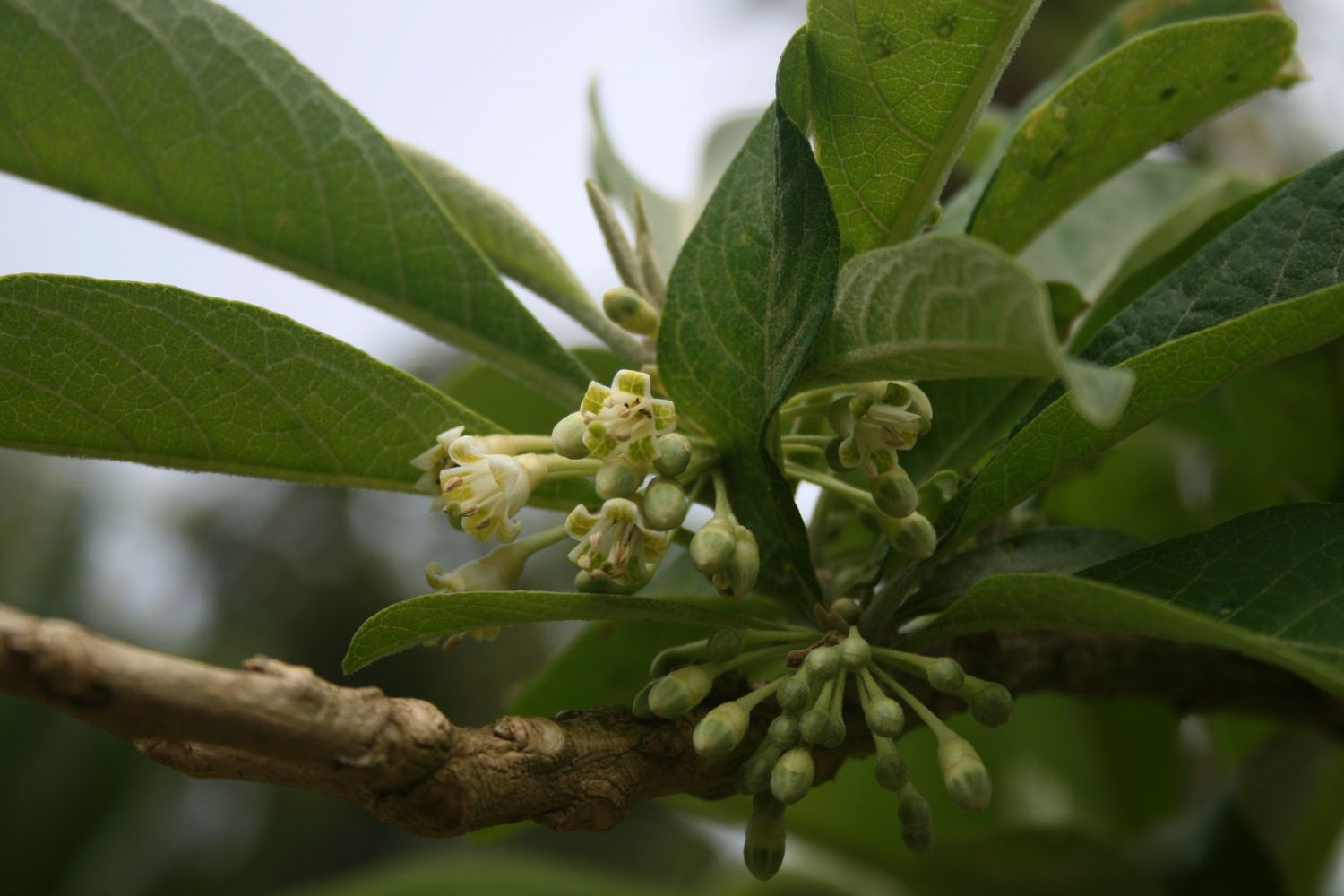

Scientific classification
- Kingdom: Plantae
- Clade: Tracheophytes
- Clade: Angiosperms
- Clade: Eudicots
- Clade: Asterids
- Order: Solanales
- Family: Solanaceae
- Genus: Iochroma
- Species: I. arborescens

Binomial name
- Iochroma arborescens (L.) J.M.H.Shaw

= Iochroma arborescens =

Species of plant

Iochroma arborescens is a species of flowering plant in the genus Iochroma, belonging to the nightshade family Solanaceae. Formerly it was considered the single species in the monotypic genus Acnistus. Common names include gallinero (= 'henhouse'), mata-gallina (= 'chicken-killer'), fruta-de-sabiá (= 'thrush-fruit'), hollowheart, wild tobacco, siyou, bastard sirio, galán arbóreo, tabaco de monte (= 'mountain tobacco'), nigüito, marieneira, güitite, and tabak djab (= 'devil's tobacco').

== Etymology ==
The former genus name Acnistus has been claimed to be a compound of the Greek prefix 'a-' and Latin 'cnistus' [ misreading of Latin 'crista' - a crest ? ] which would give the meaning 'without a crest'. A more likely derivation, however, is from the single Homeric Greek word άκνηστις (pron. 'akneestis' / 'aknistis'), meaning 'backbone', possibly in reference to the backbone-like, white, longitudinal stripes running up the centre of each green patch on the exterior of the corolla.

== Publication ==
The genus name Acnistus was published by Austrian botanist Heinrich Wilhelm Schott in Wiener Zeitschrift für Kunst, Litteratur, Theater und Mode, (- abbreviation :'Wiener Z. Kunst' - a journal featuring botanical descriptions and illustrations published between the years 1817 and 1848 ) : Vol. 4: 1180 on the 28th of November of the year 1829. The binomial Acnistus arborescens (L.) Schltdl. was published by German botanist Diederich Franz Leonhard von Schlechtendal in the journal Linnaea, Vol. 7 (pps. 67–68) in the year 1832.

== History of classification ==
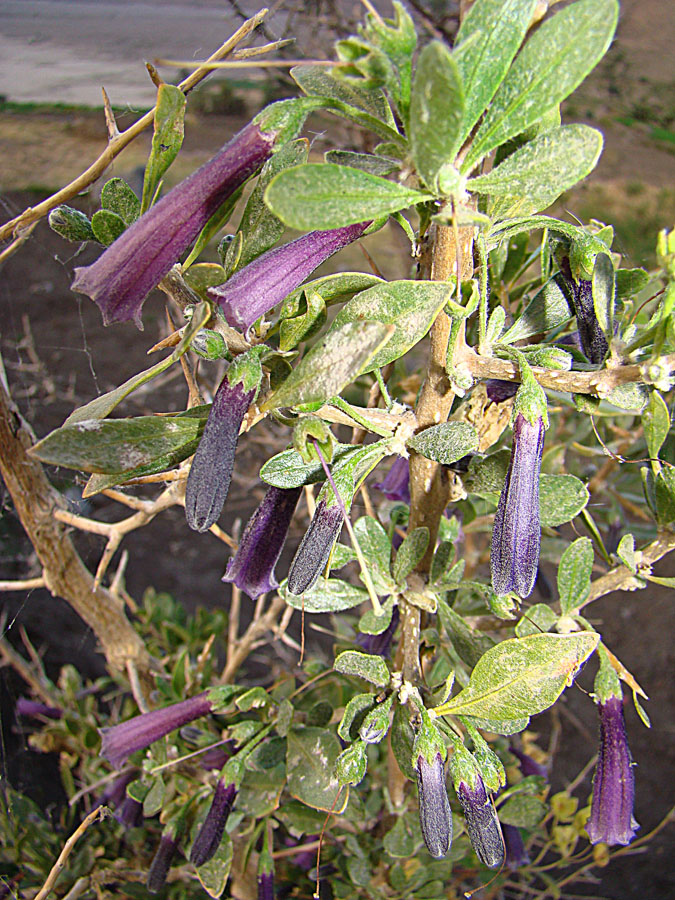
Dunalia spinosa, wild plant, growing near the town of Chachas in southern Peru (The plant now known as Acnistus arborescens has, in the past, been assigned to the closely related genus Dunalia – among many other genera.)

The case of Acnistus arborescens is remarkable, considering the vicissitudes of its long and varied taxonomic history; it has received 29 botanical names with 17 different epithets associated to 6 generic names.- Armando Hunziker

Since Hunziker made the observation quoted above, the case of Acnistus arborescens has grown yet more remarkable : the Plant List enumerates no fewer than 11 genera to which the plant has been assigned since it first became known to science : Acnistus, Atropa, Brachistus, Capsicum, Cestrum, Dunalia, Ephaiola, Eplateia, Fregirardia, Lycium and Pederlea. The brief assignment to the genus Cestrum is particularly wide of the mark, given the fact that the generic name Cestrum actually furnished the name of the subfamily Cestroideae (Acnistus belongs to the subfamily Solanoideae, not Cestroideae. Atropa is an exclusively Old World genus. The obsolete genus Fregirardia formerly contained various Capsicum species and a single species of Cestrum; while the obsolete genera Ephaiola, Eplateia and Pederlea are referable solely to Acnistus arborescens. Of the genera in the list above, Dunalia is the genus most closely related to Acnistus, belonging as it does to the same tribe within the Solanoideae – namely Physaleae (named for Physalis). Indeed, Hunziker draws attention to the fact that, such is the closeness of the relationship between Acnistus, Dunalia and Iochroma...

...these three genera were merged by Sleumer, but soon after Hunziker called attention to the elaborate stapet of Dunalia and its taxonomic importance as well. – Armando Hunziker

[ Note : the uncommon botanical term stapet (employed above by Hunziker in reference to the genus Dunalia) is used to designate congenital fusion of stamens to petals, which is found commonly in association with sympetaly in core eudicots. However, this phenomenon is rarely found in rosids The word stapet is a portmanteau of sorts, combining as it does abbreviated forms of the words stamen and petal ].

== List of 50 synonyms by genus ==
- Acnistus aggregatus (Ruiz & Pav.) Miers
- Acnistus benthamii Miers
- Acnistus campanulatus (Lam.) Merr.
- Acnistus cauliflorus Schott
- Acnistus cerasus Hieron. ex Seckt
- Acnistus confertiflorus Miers [ This name is unresolved, but some data suggest that it is synonymous with Iochroma confertiflorum (Miers) Hunz. – but see also section below on closeness / hybridisation of genera Acnistus and Iochroma ].
- Acnistus floccosus Werderm.
- Acnistus floribundus (Kunth) G.Don
- Acnistus geminifolius Dammer
- Acnistus grandiflorus Miers
- Acnistus guayaquilensis (Kunth) G.Don
- Acnistus lehmannii Dammer
- Acnistus macrophyllus (Benth.) Standl.
- Acnistus miersii Dunal
- Acnistus plumieri Miers
- Acnistus pringlei Fernald
- Acnistus punctatus Ridl.
- Acnistus ramiflorus Miers
- Acnistus sideroxyloides (Willd. ex Roem. & Schult.) G.Don
- Acnistus virgatus Griseb.
- Atropa arborea Willd. ex Dunal
- Atropa arborescens L.
- Atropa arborescens Roem. & Schult.
- Atropa sideroxyloides Willd. ex Roem. & Schult.
- Atropa solanacea All. ex Steud.
- Brachistus oblongifolius Miers
- Brachistus physocalycius D.A.Sm.
- Brachistus riparius (Kunth) Miers
- Capsicum oblongifolium (Miers) Kuntze
- Cestrum campanulatum Lam.
- Cestrum cauliflorum Jacq.
- Cestrum cauliflorum Sieber ex Bercht. & C.Presl
- Cestrum kohauti Bercht. & J.Presl
- Cestrum macrostemon Sessé & Moç.
- Dunalia arborescens (L.) Sleumer
- Dunalia arborescens var. campanulata (Lam.) J.F.Macbr.
- Dunalia campanulata (Lam.) J.F.Macbr.
- Dunalia macrophylla (Benth.) Sleumer
- Ephaiola odorata Raf.
- Eplateia arborescens (L.) Raf.
- Fregirardia riparia (Kunth) Dunal
- Lycium aggregatum Ruiz & Pav.
- Lycium arborescens (L.) Spreng.
- Lycium grandifolium Willd. ex Roem. & Schult.
- Lycium guayaquilense Kunth
- Lycium macrophyllum Benth.
- Lycium ovale Roem. & Schult.
- Pederlea aggregata (Ruiz & Pav.) Raf.
- Pederlea arborescens (L.) Raf.
- Pederlea cestroides Raf.

== Taxonomy ==
It is a member of the subtribe Iochrominae, which contains the following genera:

- Dunalia Kunth
- Eriolarynx (Hunz.) Hunz.
- Iochroma Benth.
- Saracha Ruiz and Pav.
- Vassobia Rusby

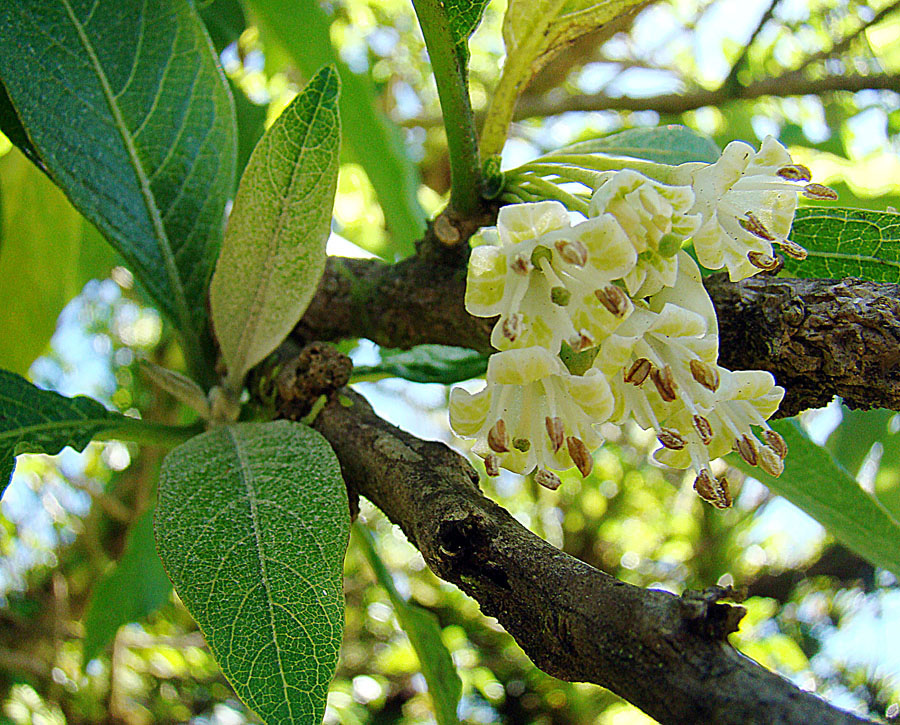
Flowers of Acnistus arborescens, viewed from beneath, revealing taxonomically significant 1.) short anthers and 2.) yellowish-green marks on interior of corolla lobes. Wild plant, Volcan Mombacho, Nicaragua.

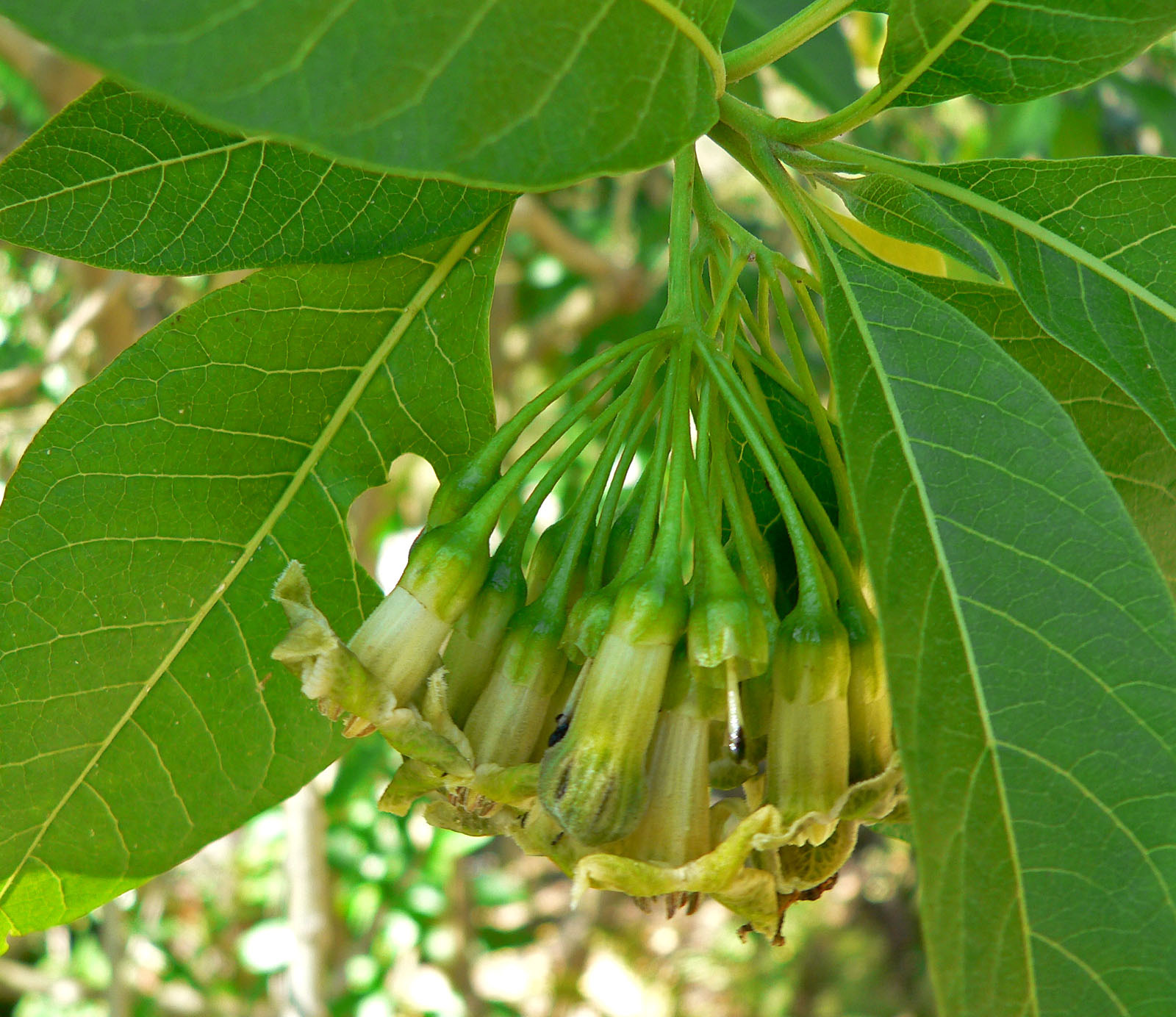
The flowers of certain species of Iochroma bear a marked similarity to those of Acnistus – note especially green stripes on interior of white corolla lobes (Iochroma umbellatum – cultivated plant, University of California Botanical Garden, Berkeley, California)

Iochroma Benth. was the genus most closely related to the monotypic genus Acnistus, differing by its induplicate corolla aestivation – with five conspicuous plaits lacking in Acnistus, its (Iochroma) accrescent calyx (unchanged or only slightly accrescent in Acnistus) and its (Iochroma) larger anthers (1.4 – 2.1 mm long in Acnistus, but 2.8 – 4.7 mm long in Iochroma).

Concerning the very close relationship of Iochroma with the monotypic genus Acnistus, it is of the utmost importance to make intensive collections properly annotated in southern Ecuador and northern Peru; in this region native populations grow, with yellow-coloured corollas which appear to be intermediate between both genera. – Armando Hunziker (2001)

In Hunziker’s revision of Acnistus, he acknowledged that Acnistus has greatest affinity to the genus Iochroma. The important differences he noted between them were the small flowers and anthers of Acnistus, the calyx (accresent in Iochroma but not in Acnistus), and the bud aestivation (induplicate in Iochroma but valvate in Acnistus). Confusing this demarcation are a few species currently placed in Iochroma that have the latter two characteristics of Acnistus. For example, Iochroma ellipticum and I. confertiflorum, two large-flowered species that were transferred from Acnistus by Hunziker, have valvate bud aestivation and lack a strongly accresent calyx. This combination of traits is also found in two recently named species, I. edule and I. salpoanum and in I. peruvianum. Furthermore, field observations of these five Iochroma spp. (S. D. Smith, personal observation) indicate that they share with Acnistus a conspicuous green mark on the inner surface of the corolla lobe, which fades to yellow as the flower ages. Thus, it is not surprising that Acnistus and these five other species form a well-supported clade in our analyses...but whether this group should be officially segregated from Iochroma deserves careful consideration...The small-flowered form traditionally named Acnistus arborescens occurs from Argentina to Mexico and the Caribbean and is morphologically variable...A. arborescens [may] refer to a lowland progenitor form that has given rise to multiple novel higher-elevation forms... A. arborescens may occasionally hybridize in nature with related higher-elevation taxa such as Iochroma confertiflorum (S. D. Smith, personal observation)... – Stacey DeWitt Smith and David A.Baum (2006)

== Description ==
Iochroma arborescens forms a large shrub or small tree up to 10 meters in height. It flowers in clusters on naked branch parts below the leaves. Leaves are alternate, simple, elliptical, narrow to a long v-shape at the base, variably narrowed to a point at the tip, 15 to 30 cm long and 5 to 15 cm wide, margins entire or slightly wavy, hairless except when young. Young stems and young leaves have rusty hairs. The fragrant flowers bloom in clusters of 30 or more, with broadly funnel-shaped tubes about 1.2 cm long and recurving lobes. The protruding stamens are greenish-white to cream. The bright orange fruit is round, and about 1 cm across. There is evidence that these fruits are bird-dispersed.

The plant flowers sporadically throughout the year and fruits generally from March to July.

== Distribution and habitat ==
The plant is native to Central and South America, and the Caribbean, a species characteristic of Montane cloud forests (in clearings, forest edges etc.) between 300 and 2000m elevation. In Puerto Rico and the United States Virgin Islands, it is classified by the US Department of Agriculture as a native plant species.

== Edibility/inedibility of fruit ==
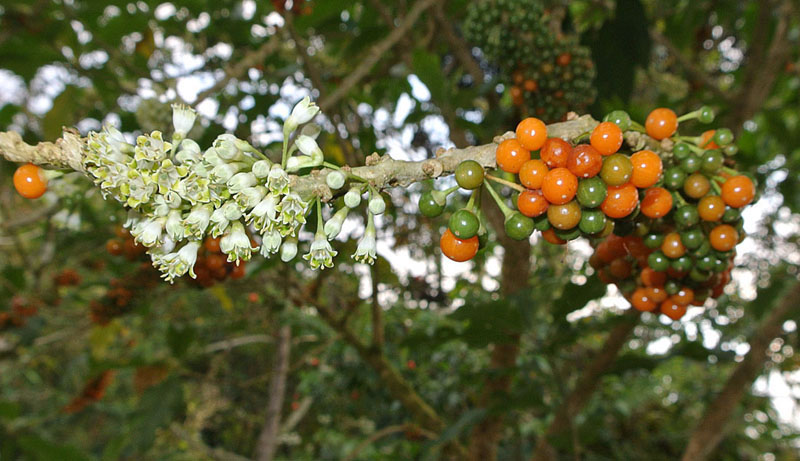
Branch of Acnistus arborescens bearing simultaneously flowers and fruit – both ripe and unripe. Wild plant, Sumaco Napo-Galeras National Park, Ecuador – where the plant has the common name of Gallinero.

Some sources claim that the attractive fruits are edible (though causing diarrhea if consumed to excess) : others that they are inedible, due to bitterness or insipidity. The variability in chemistry of different populations (see below) may account for these conflicting accounts. In addition to being consumed raw, the fruits have also been used to prepare fruit preserves and / or jellies .

== Medicinal uses ==
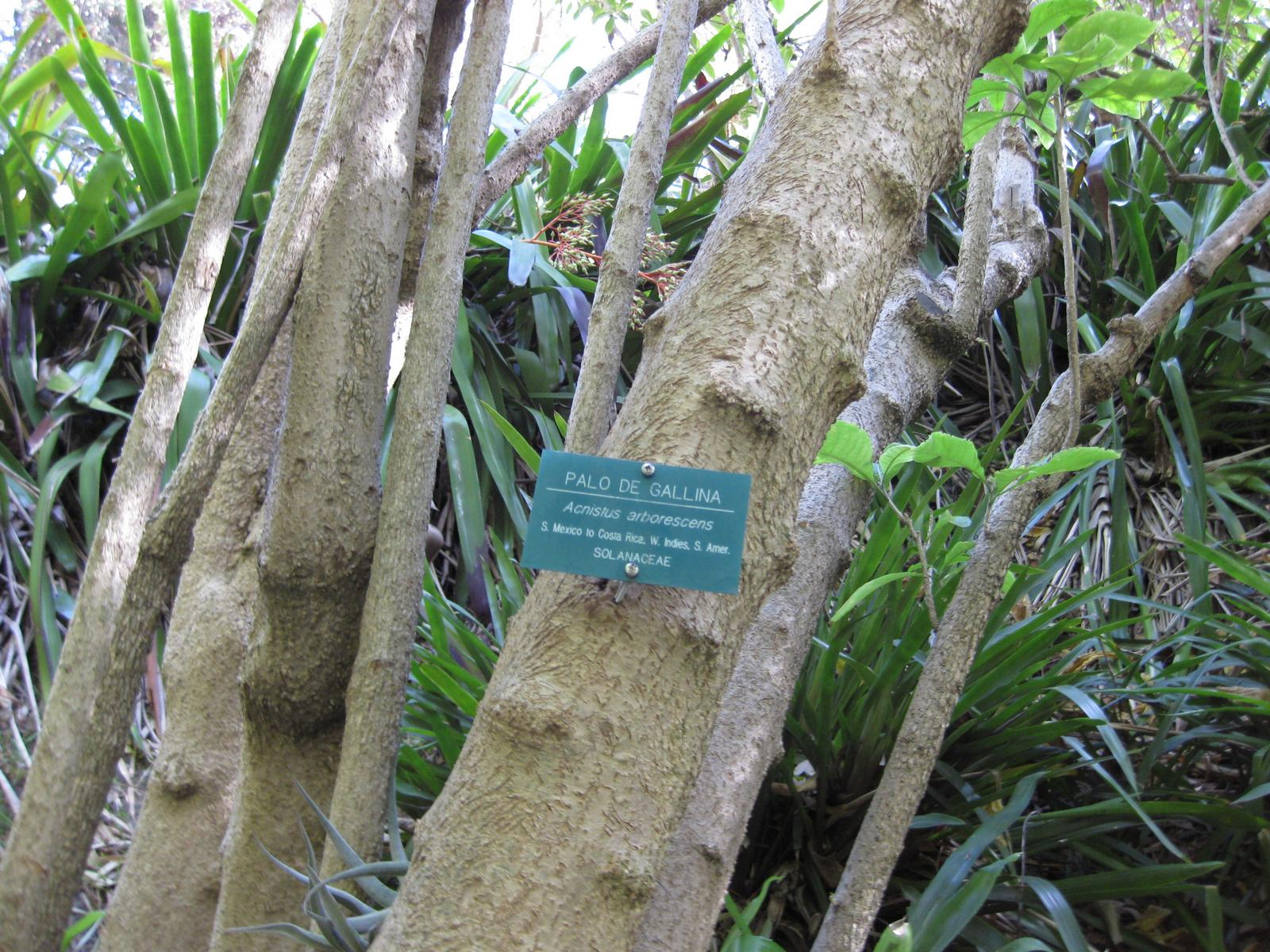
Trunks of mature specimen of Acnistus arborescens showing corky, grey bark. Cultivated plant, Mildred E. Mathias Botanical Garden at UCLA, Westwood, Los Angeles, California.

Leaf extracts in have been used in folk medicine for cancerous growths, and scientific studies indicate that compounds present in the plant display in vitro cytotoxic activity against a panel of human cancer cell lines. A hot infusion of the leaves or bark has been used for bruises and sprains.

== Psychoactivity ==
In Brazil, the plant is considered to be psychoactive, possessing narcotic and depressant properties. The patois name Tabak djab (Devil's tobacco) may be significant in this context, suggesting that the leaves of the plant may have been smoked. Compare the Spanish name Tabaco del Diablo – also meaning Devil's Tobacco – applied to Lobelia tupa, a narcotic plant smoked by the Mapuche of Chile.

== Toxicity ==
Iochroma arborescens is seldom portrayed in the literature as a particularly poisonous plant, but two sets of herbarium notes from dried specimens held by the New York Botanical Garden present a different picture : a specimen collected in Peru bears the note 'sap very poisonous' and gives the common name 'Catahui', while another collected in Martinique under the synonym Atropa arborescens carries the German note 'Die Pflanze enthält narkotisch giftige Stoffe' (the plant contains narcotic poisons).

== Chemistry ==
The plant contains withanolides, including cytotoxic withaphysalins. An alkaloid, acnistine is also sometimes present, studies having indicated that this widespread tropical American species contains a number of chemical races, other analyses of the same species having yielded yet other compounds. Ayensu (1981) lists alkaloids, glycosides, organic acids, saponins and tannins as constituents of plant material collected in Trinidad and Dominica.

The essential oil from leaves harvested from a population of I. arborescens growing in the vicinity of Mérida, Venezuela, has been isolated by hydrodistillation. The chemical composition of the leaf oil thus recovered was determined by GC-FID and GC-MS and the most abundant components found to be (Z)-hex-2-enal (40.7%) and estragol (25.6%).

== Influence of floral scent upon insect pollination ==
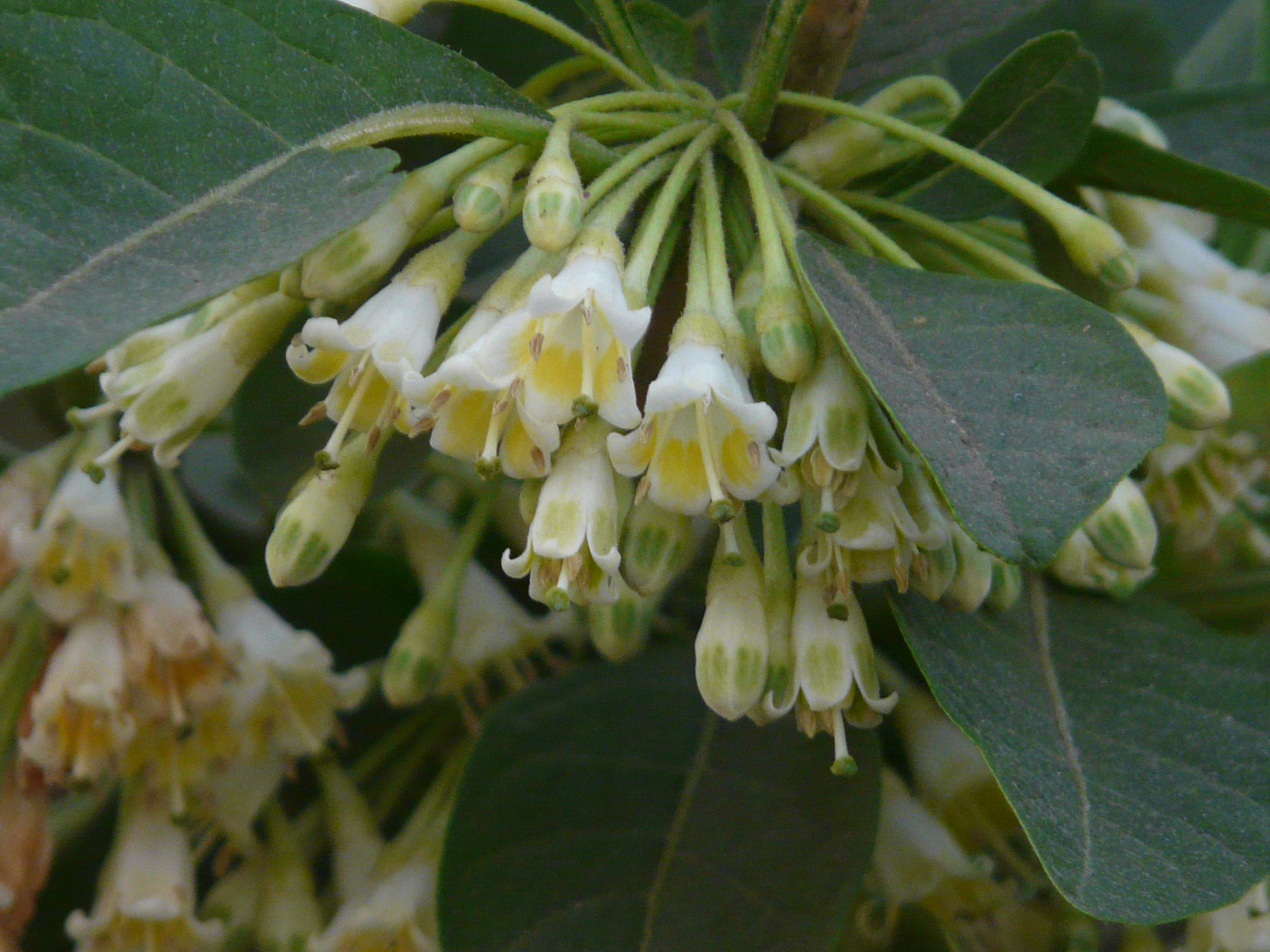
The fragrant flowers of Acnistus arborescens, redolent of a rare volatile attractive to honey bees.

The flowers of I. arborescens secrete a fragrant compound of rare occurrence (though found also in roses and the flowers of the Amaryllid Narcissus tazetta) called orcinol dimethyl ether or 3,5-Dimethoxytoluene. This volatile is almost undetectable by the human nose, but (as revealed by experiments) readily detectable by the olfactory sense of honey bees.

== Cultivation ==
Iochroma arborescens is grown as an ornamental tree for gardens and natural landscaping projects for its attractive flowers and abundant beautiful golden fruit, the latter being relished by many species of birds – whence its Brazilian common name Fruta-de-sabiá (Portuguese for 'thrush fruit').

== Gallery ==
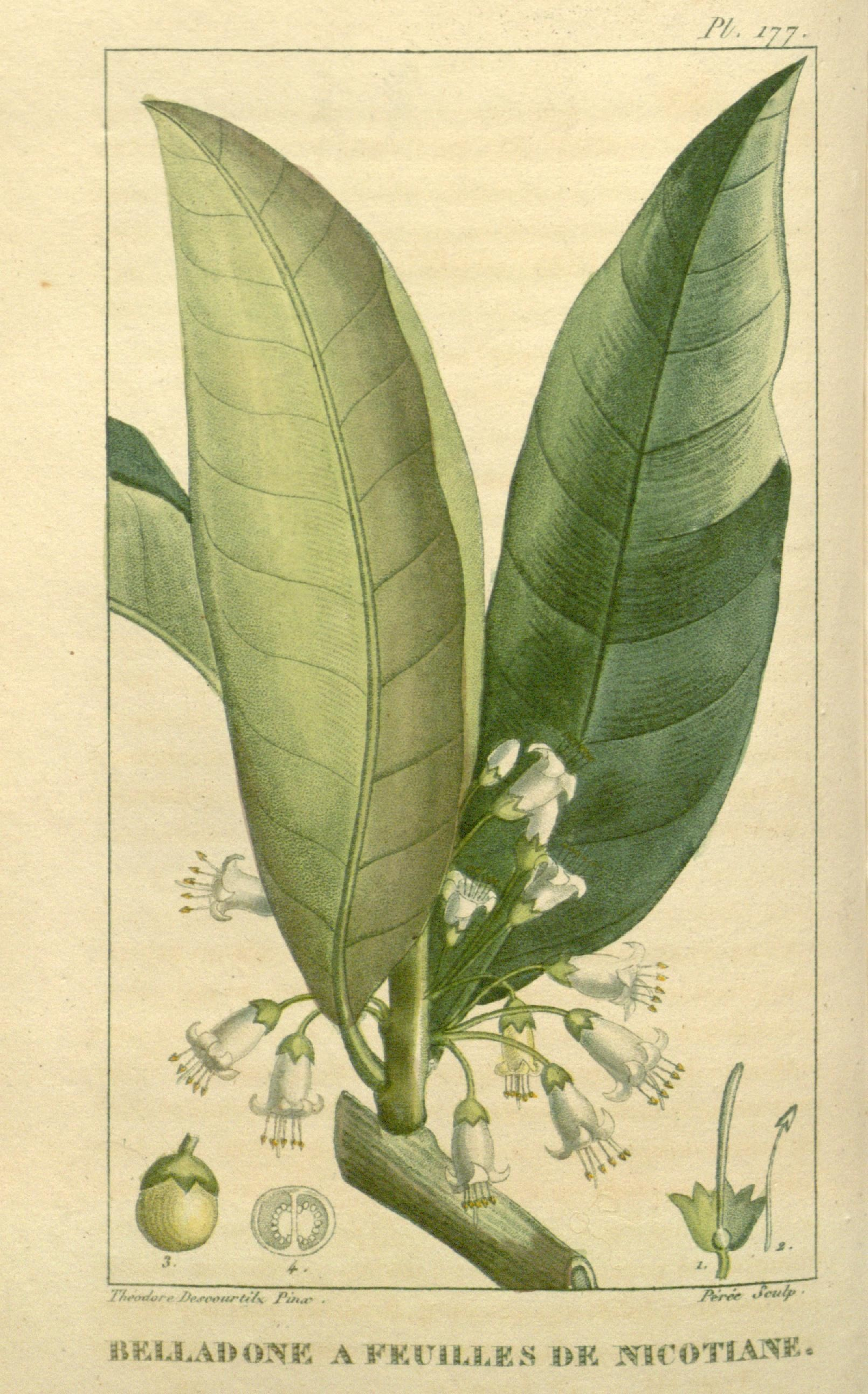
Plate from Flore médicale des Antilles (1827) by J. Descourtilz, bearing the French title 'Nicotiana-leaved (i.e. Tobacco-leaved) belladonna' and showing anatomy of flower and fruit of Acnistus arborescens.

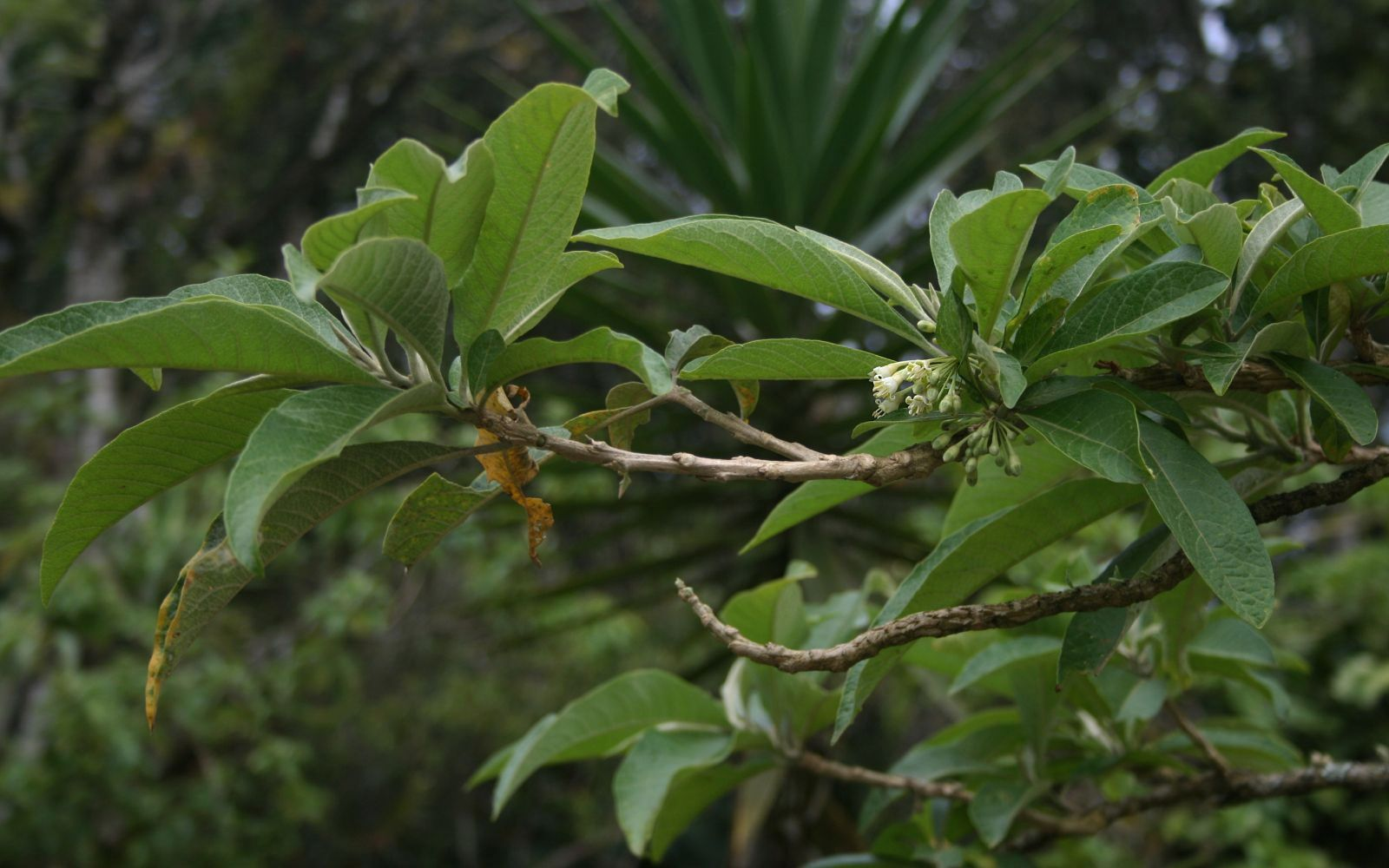
Acnistus arborescens, cultivated plant, Lankester Botanical Garden Costa Rica.
