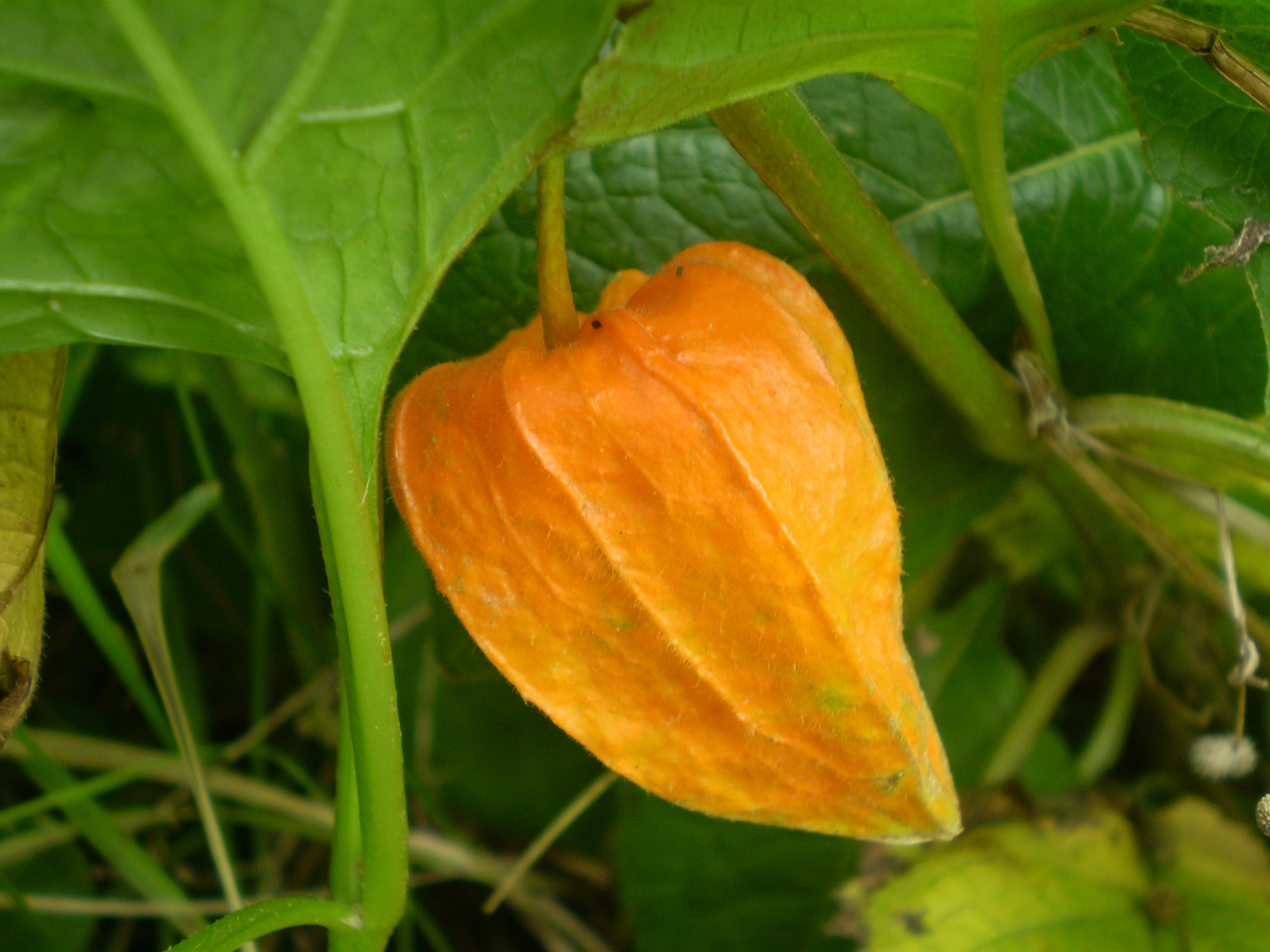
- Alkekengi officinarum

Scientific classification
- Kingdom: Plantae
- Clade: Tracheophytes
- Clade: Angiosperms
- Clade: Eudicots
- Clade: Asterids
- Order: Solanales
- Family: Solanaceae
- Subfamily: Solanoideae
- Tribe: Physaleae; D'Arcy

Subtribes
- Iochrominae; Physalinae; Withaninae

= Physaleae =

Tribe of flowering plants

Physaleae is a tribe of flowering plants in the subfamily Solanoideae of the family Solanaceae.

== Genera ==
Subtribe Iochrominae

- Acnistus Schott
- Dunalia Kunth
- Iochroma Benth.
- Saracha Ruiz & Pav.
- Vassobia Rusby

Subtribe Physalinae

- Alkekengi Mill.
- Brachistus Miers
- Calliphysalis Whitson
- Chamaesaracha (A.Gray) Benth.
- Leucophysalis Rydb.
- Oryctes S.Watson
- Physalis L.
- Quincula Raf.
- Tzeltalia E.Estrada & M.Martínez
- Witheringia L'Hér.

Subtribe Withaninae

- Athenaea Sendtn.
- Aureliana Sendtn.
- Discopodium Hochst.
- Mellissia Hook.f.
- Nothocestrum A.Gray
- Tubocapsicum (Wettst.) Makino
- Withania Pauquy

incertae sedis

- Cuatresia Hunz.
- Deprea Raf. (syn. Larnax Miers)
