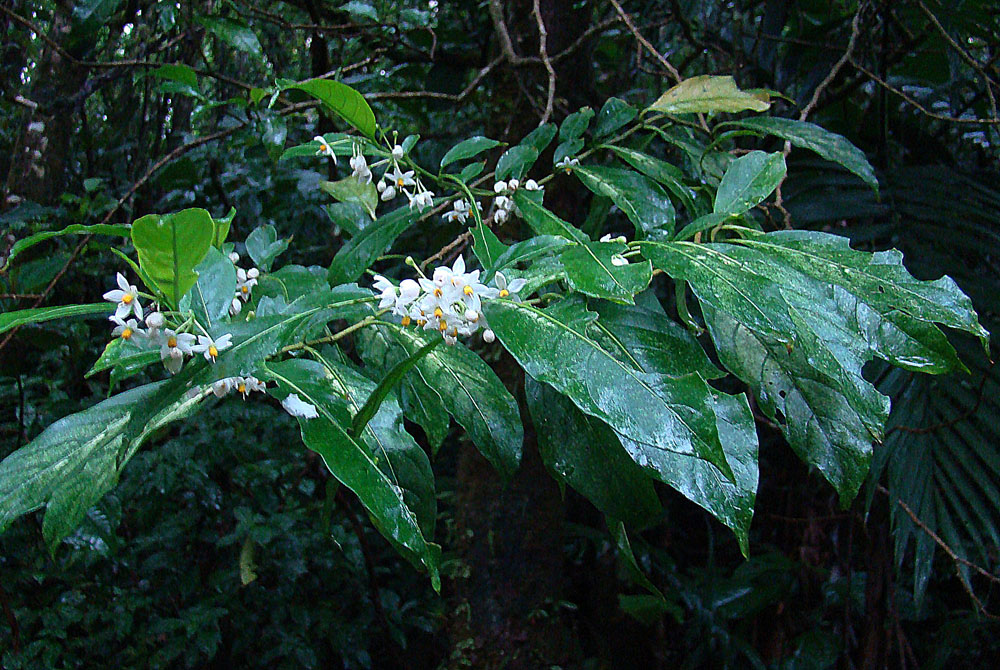

Scientific classification
- Kingdom: Plantae
- Clade: Tracheophytes
- Clade: Angiosperms
- Clade: Eudicots
- Clade: Asterids
- Order: Solanales
- Family: Solanaceae
- Genus: Solanum
- Species: S. arboreum

Binomial name
- Solanum arboreum Humb. & Bonpl. ex Dunal

Synonyms
- Solanum dolichostylum O.E.Schulz; Solanum euchylozum Bitter; Solanum kenoyeri Standl.; Solanum orgyale C.V.Morton

= Solanum arboreum =

Species of shrub

Solanum arboreum is an arborescent shrub in the family Solanaceae, which reaches a height of 0.5–3 m (1 ft 8 in – 9 ft 10 in). It is native to Central and South America.
