= Saracha =

Scientific classification
- Kingdom: Plantae
- Clade: Tracheophytes
- Clade: Angiosperms
- Clade: Eudicots
- Clade: Asterids
- Order: Solanales
- Family: Solanaceae
- Tribe: Physaleae
- Genus: Saracha; Ruiz & Pav. (1794)

Synonyms
- Bellinia Roem. & Schult. (1819), nom. superfl.; Diskion Raf. (1838), nom. superfl.; Poecilochroma Miers (1848), nom. superfl.

Genus of flowering plant

Saracha is a genus of flowering plants belonging to tribe Physaleae of subfamily Solanoideae of the nightshade family Solanaceae. The genera most closely related to Saracha are Iochroma, Dunalia, and Vassobia.

It is native to Bolivia, Colombia, Ecuador, Peru and Venezuela.

The genus name of Saracha is in honour of Isidoro Saracha (1733–1803), a Spanish monk, apothecary and botanist at the Abbey of Santo Domingo de Silos. It was first described and published in Fl. Peruv. Prodr. on page 31 in 1794.

== Known species ==
According to Kew:

- Saracha andina Rob.Fernandez, Revilla & E.Pariente
- Saracha ferruginea (Sodiro & Damm.) ined.
- Saracha guttata (Miers) Miers
- Saracha ovata (Miers) Hunz.
- Saracha pubescens Humb. ex Roem. & Schult.
- Saracha punctata Ruiz & Pav.
- Saracha quitensis (Hook.) Miers
- Saracha spinosa (Dammer) D'Arcy & D.N.Sm.
