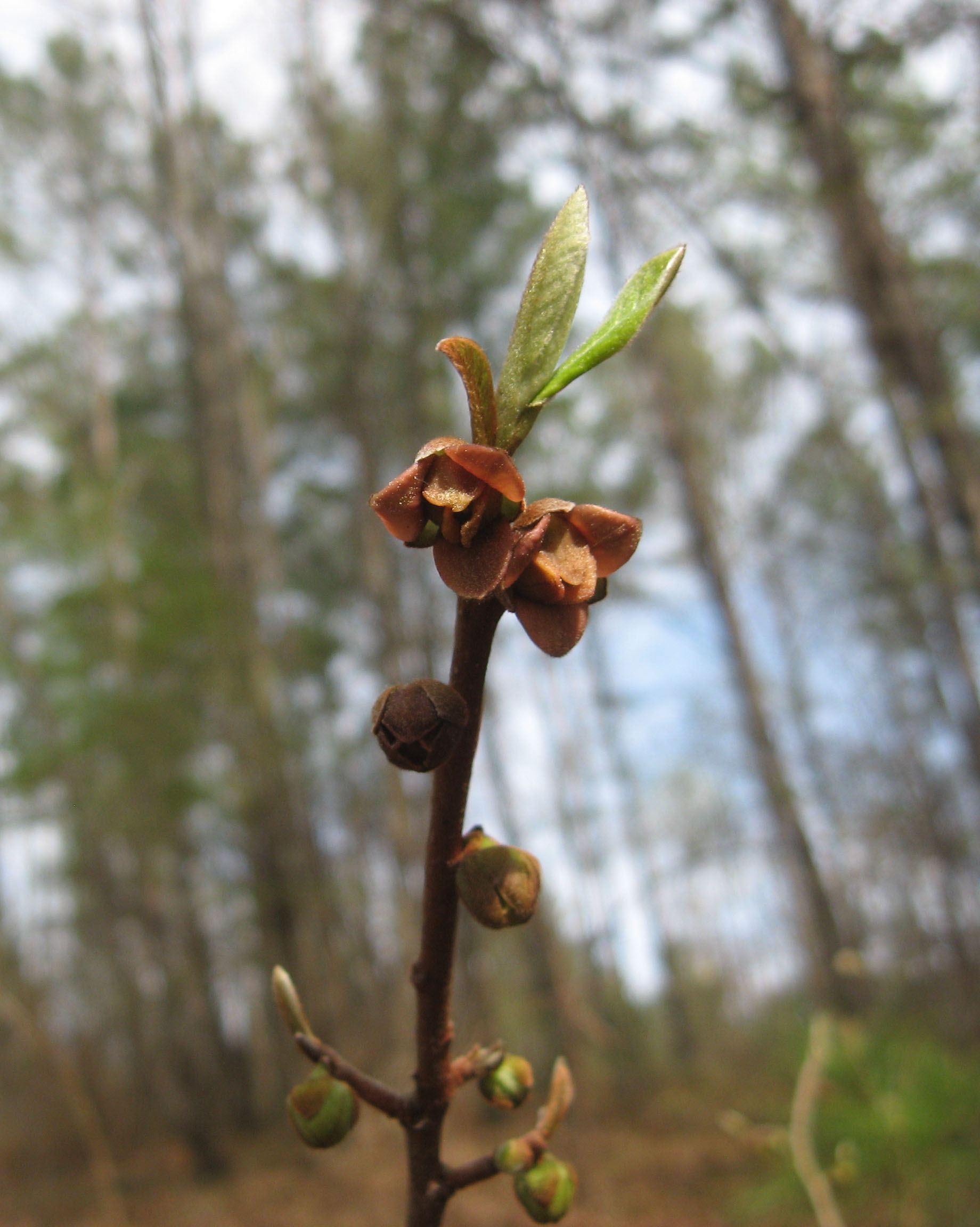

Conservation status
- Least Concern (IUCN 3.1)

Scientific classification
- Kingdom: Plantae
- Clade: Tracheophytes
- Clade: Angiosperms
- Clade: Magnoliids
- Order: Magnoliales
- Family: Annonaceae
- Genus: Asimina
- Species: A. parviflora

Binomial name
- Asimina parviflora (Michx.) Dunal

Synonyms
- Orchidocarpum parviflorum Michx.; Porcelia parviflora (Michx.) Pers.; Uvaria parviflora (Michx.) Torr. & A.Gray

= Asimina parviflora =

Species of tree

Asimina parviflora, the smallflower pawpaw, is a small to medium shrub in the custard apple family.

Asimina parviflora hybridizes readily with A. triloba to form Asimina × piedmontana.

== Distribution ==
It is native to the Southeastern United States, where it is found from Texas to Virginia. It is found most often in sandy areas, alluvial areas, and dry woods.

== Description ==
Asimina parviflora has maroon, fleshy flowers in the spring. It produces an edible fruit, although the fruit is smaller than of its relative Asimina triloba, the pawpaw tree.

Its pollen is shed as permanent tetrads. Small-flower pawpaws are found further south than common pawpaws, and form shrubs rather than trees, with most plants ranging in height from one to three feet, with only a few getting taller. The flowers are usually smaller than two centimeters in size. The flowers begin as brown buds, then swell to green immature flowers, and turn burgundy or brown when fully mature. They reach up to 3 inches in length.

The leaves are usually a dark green, and smooth in texture. They are alternately arranged, and are simple, oblanceolate to oblong, or obovate in shape. They can reach up to 8 inches in length.

== Ecology ==
=== Habitat ===
A. parviflora is found most commonly in environments with loamy or moist sands, such as woodland slopes, floodplains, and hardwood forests.

=== Phenology ===
The flowers of A. parviflora are in bloom from February to May, but some individuals have been observed to be flowering in June.

== Cultural uses ==
The fruit of A. parviflora is edible, often used in baking or eaten raw.

The seeds of the fruit can be used medicinally, able to induce vomiting or function as a head lice remedy when powdered. Additionally, juice made from the fruit of A. parviflora has been used as a treatment for intestinal worms.

== Gallery ==
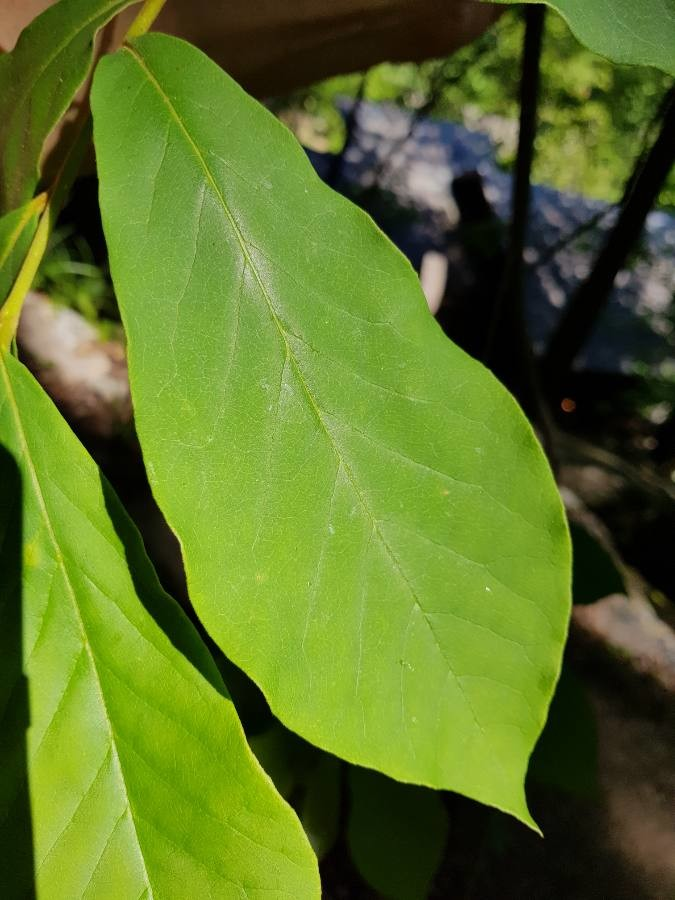
Leaf

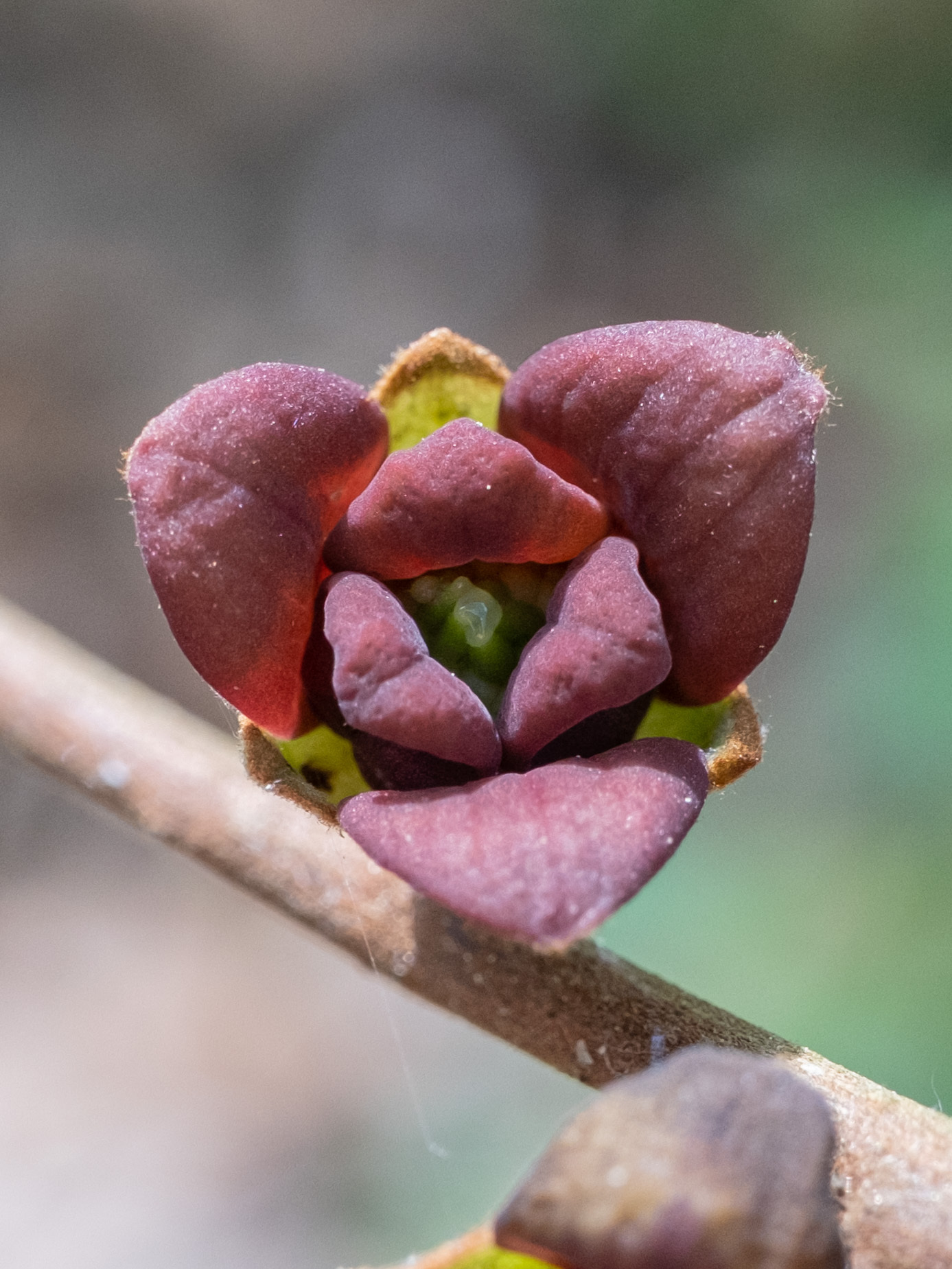
Flower

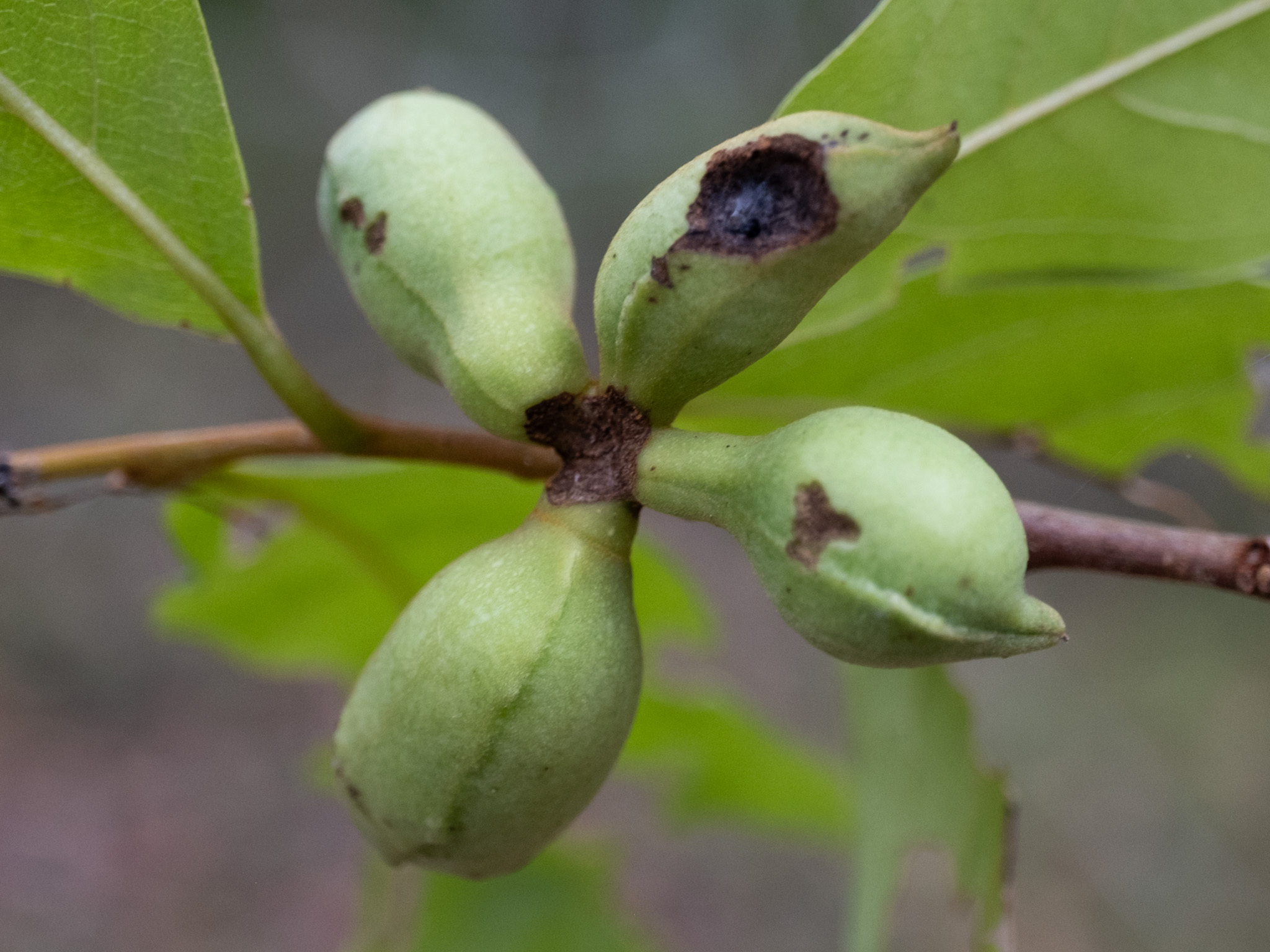
Fruits

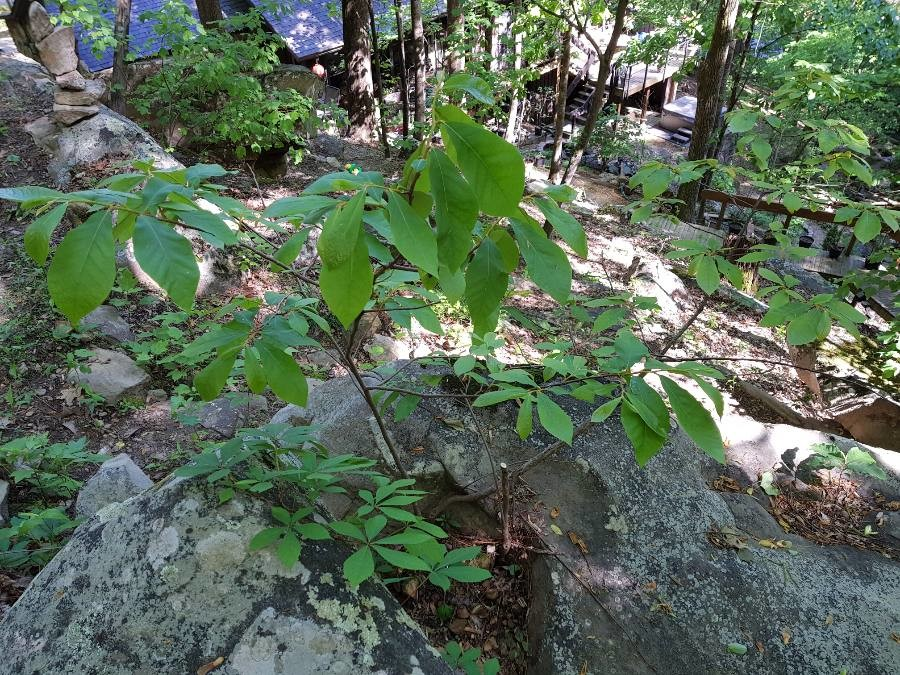
Bush
