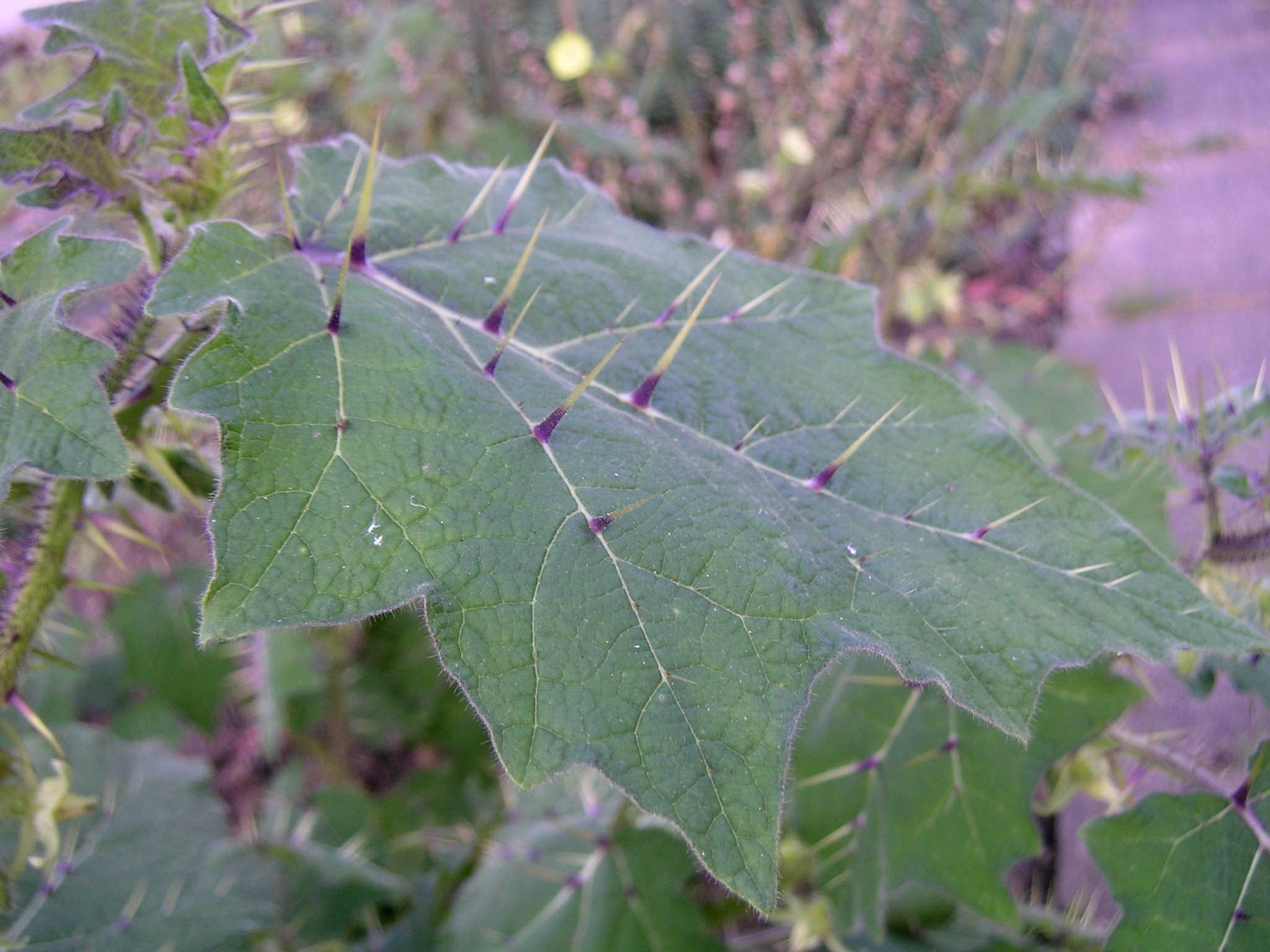
- Close up of leaf
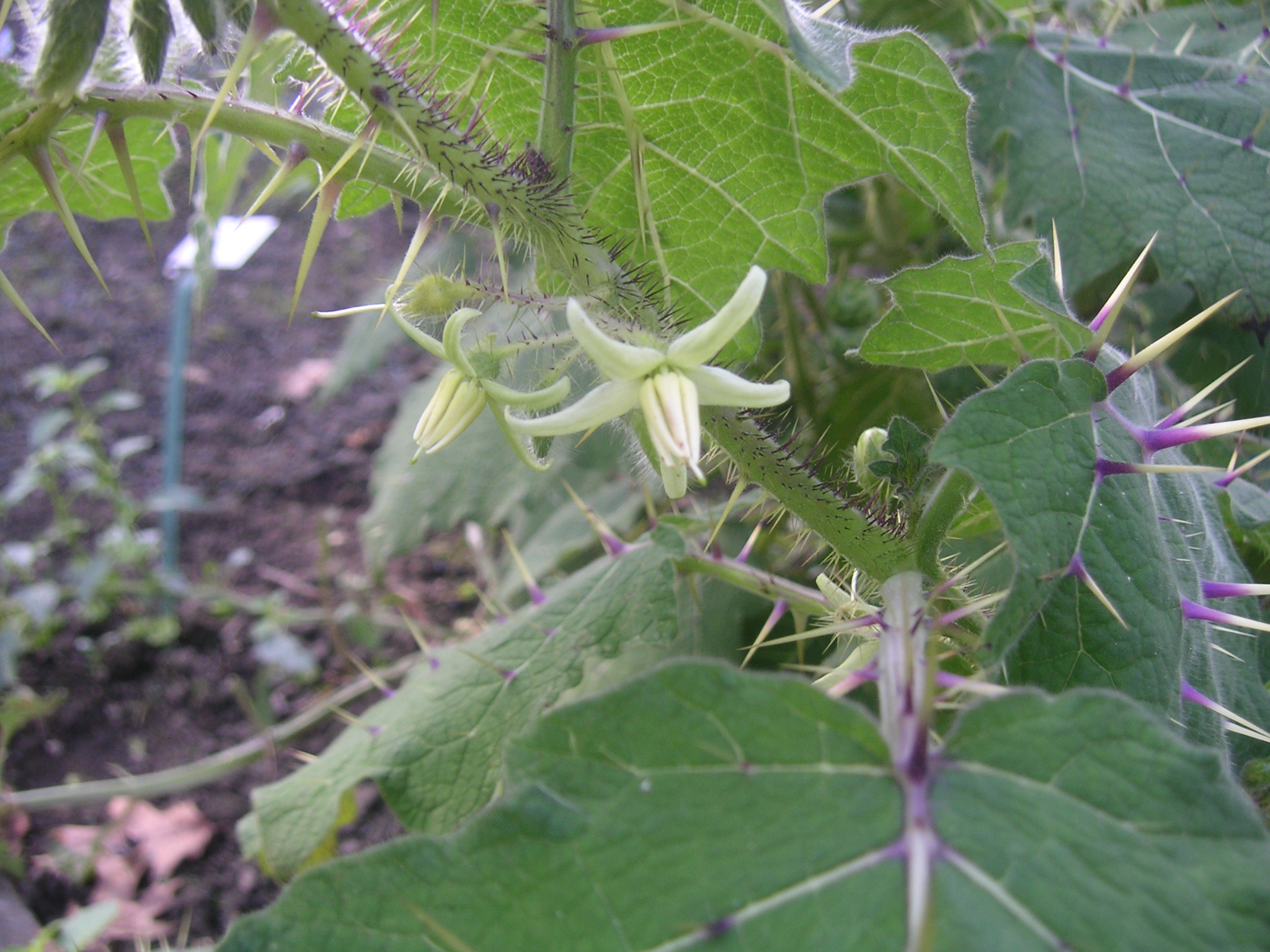
- Flower buds

Scientific classification
- Kingdom: Plantae
- Clade: Tracheophytes
- Clade: Angiosperms
- Clade: Eudicots
- Clade: Asterids
- Order: Solanales
- Family: Solanaceae
- Genus: Solanum
- Species: S. myriacanthum

Binomial name
- Solanum myriacanthum Dunal

Synonyms
- Solanum chloropetalon Schltdl.; Solanum khasianum C.B.Clarke; Solanum macranthum M.Martens & Galeotti; Solanum porphyranthum Dunal; Solanum reflexum var. chloropetalon Witasek

= Solanum myriacanthum =

Species of plant in the nightshade family

Solanum myriacanthum (syn. Solanum khasianum), the Himalayan nightshade, is a species of flowering plant in the family Solanaceae. It is native to Mexico and Central America, and has been introduced to Cuba, Nepal, Assam and Myanmar. It may be invasive in the southeastern United States
