= Oryctes (disambiguation) =

Oryctes is a scientific name which may refer to:

- Oryctes, a genus of beetles
- Oryctes nevadensis, the sole species in the plant genus Oryctes
