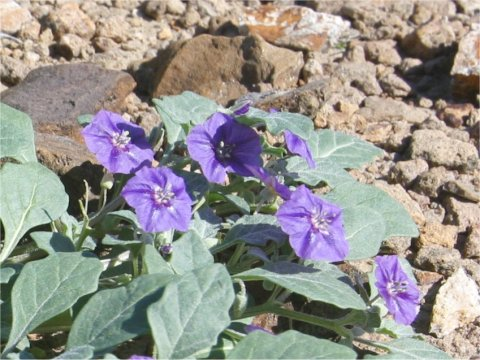

Conservation status
- Least Concern (IUCN 3.1)

- Secure (NatureServe)

Scientific classification
- Kingdom: Plantae
- Clade: Tracheophytes
- Clade: Angiosperms
- Clade: Eudicots
- Clade: Asterids
- Order: Solanales
- Family: Solanaceae
- Subfamily: Solanoideae
- Tribe: Physaleae
- Genus: Quincula; Raf.
- Species: Q. lobata

Binomial name
- Quincula lobata (Torr.) Raf.

Synonyms
- Physalis lobata Torr.

= Quincula =

Genus of flowering plants

Quincula is a monotypic genus of flowering plants in the nightshade family, Solanaceae. The sole species it contains, Quincula lobata, is commonly known as Chinese lantern, lobed groundcherry, or purple groundcherry.

This plant is also classified as Physalis lobata in genus Physalis.

== Distribution ==
It is native to the southwestern United States as far east as Kansas and Oklahoma, as well as northern Mexico, where it grows in many types of open, dry habitat, including disturbed areas.

== Description ==
It is a perennial herb producing ridged, spreading stems up to half a meter long. The lance-shaped leaves are up to 7 centimetres (2.8 in) long, smooth or lobed on the edges. The flowers blooming from the leaf axils are up to 2 centimetres (0.79 in) wide, widely bell-shaped or flat-faced with five vague, pointed lobes, not drooping like those of many Physalis species. They are purple in color, sometimes with white deep in the throats. The bell-shaped calyx of sepals at the base of the flower enlarges as the fruit develops, becoming an inflated, lanternlike structure up to 2 centimetres (0.79 in) long which contains the berry.

Phylogenetic studies suggest that Quincula is closely related to the small North American genus Chamaesaracha.

The plant's berries have been used by the Kiowa tribe to make jam.
