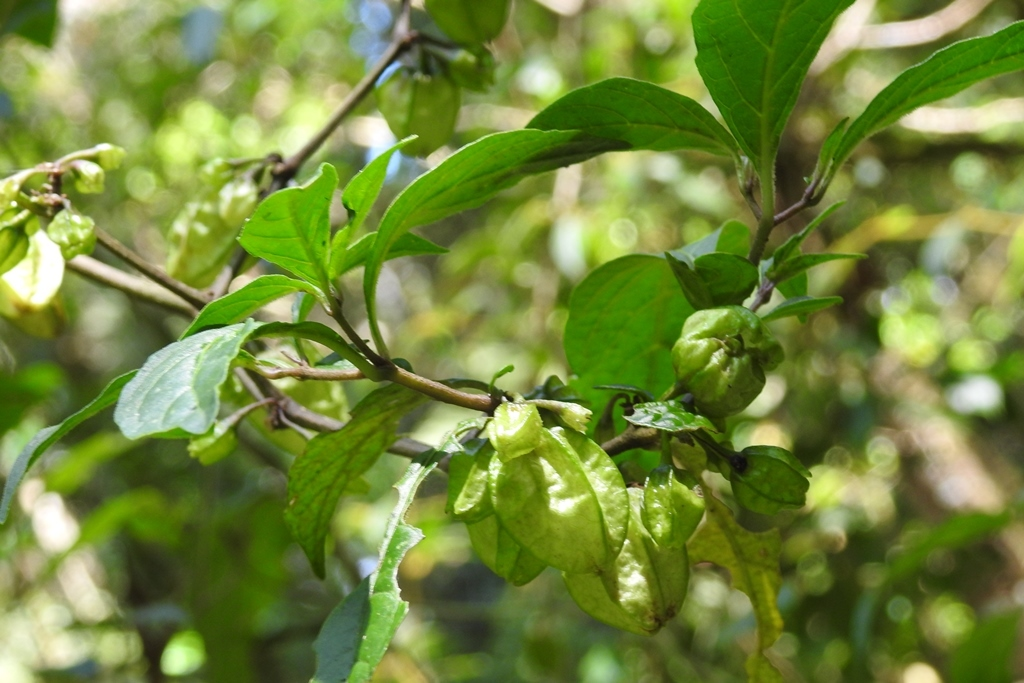
- Tzeltalia amphitricha in Mexico

Scientific classification
- Kingdom: Plantae
- Clade: Tracheophytes
- Clade: Angiosperms
- Clade: Eudicots
- Clade: Asterids
- Order: Solanales
- Family: Solanaceae
- Subfamily: Solanoideae
- Tribe: Physaleae
- Genus: Tzeltalia; E.Estrada & M.Martínez

= Tzeltalia =

Genus of flowering plants

Tzeltalia is a genus of flowering plants belonging to the family Solanaceae.

Its native range is Guatemala and North America.

Species:

- Tzeltalia amphitricha (Bitter) E.Estrada & M.Martínez
- Tzeltalia calidaria (Standl. & Steyerm.) E.Estrada & M.Martínez
- Tzeltalia esenbeckii M.Martínez & O.Vargas
