= Deprea andersonii =

Conservation status
- Vulnerable (IUCN 3.1)

Scientific classification
- Kingdom: Plantae
- Clade: Tracheophytes
- Clade: Angiosperms
- Clade: Eudicots
- Clade: Asterids
- Order: Solanales
- Family: Solanaceae
- Genus: Deprea
- Species: D. andersonii

Binomial name
- Deprea andersonii (N.W.Sawyer) Deanna & S.Leiva (2015)

Synonyms
- Larnax andersonii N.W.Sawyer (1998)

Species of flowering plant

Deprea andersonii is a species of flowering plant in the family Solanaceae. It is endemic to Ecuador.
