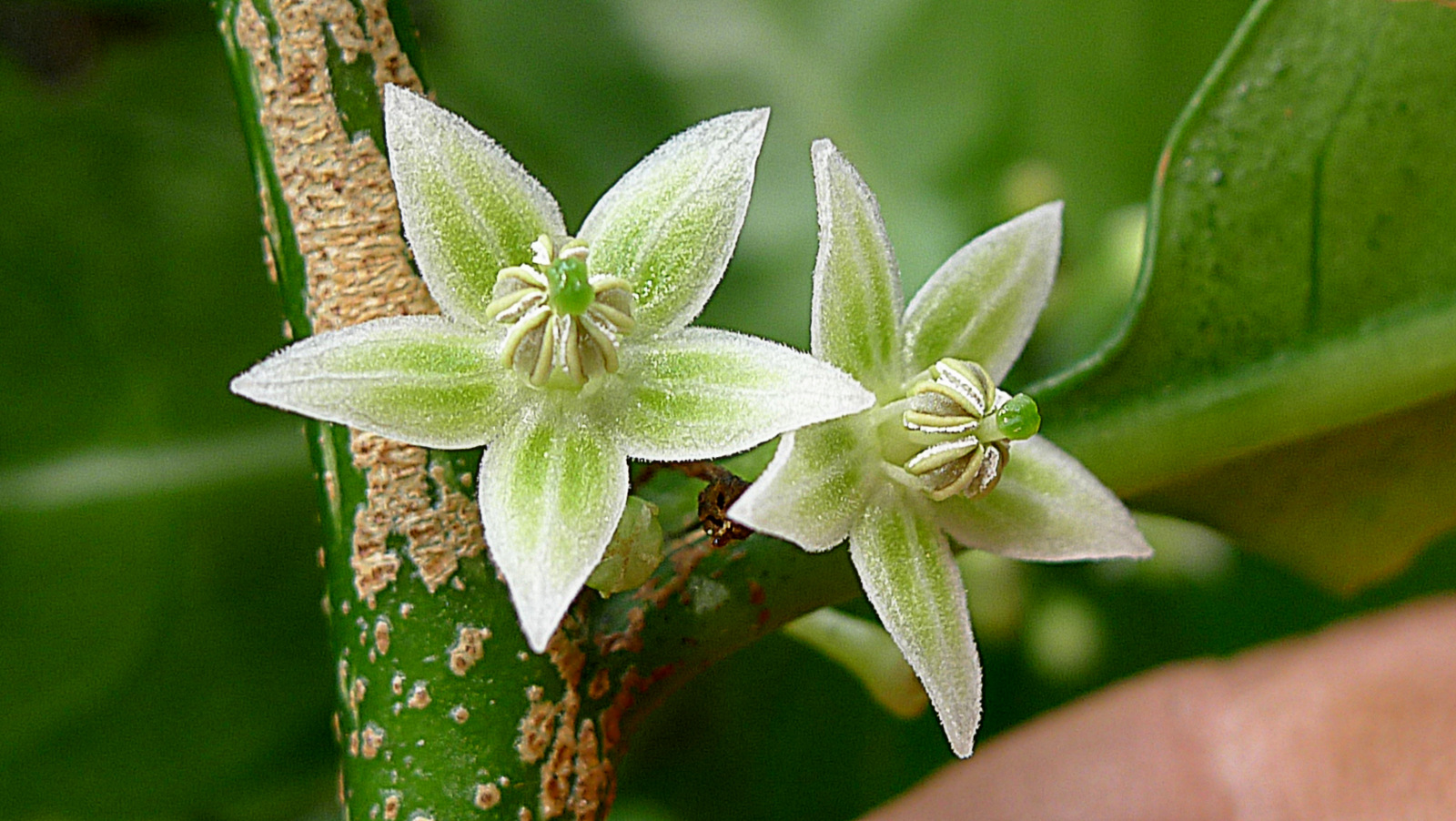
- Athenaea fasciculata

Scientific classification
- Kingdom: Plantae
- Clade: Tracheophytes
- Clade: Angiosperms
- Clade: Eudicots
- Clade: Asterids
- Order: Solanales
- Family: Solanaceae
- Subfamily: Solanoideae
- Tribe: Physaleae
- Subtribe: Withaninae
- Genus: Athenaea; Sendtn., nom. cons.

Species
- 14; see text

Synonyms
- Aureliana Sendtn., nom. illeg.; Witheringia Miers, nom. illeg.

= Athenaea (plant) =

Genus of flowering plants

Athenaea is a genus of plants in the family Solanaceae. It includes 14 species native to South America, ranging through Brazil to Bolivia, Paraguay, and northeastern Argentina. The greatest diversity of species is in the Brazilian Atlantic Rainforest.

== Species ==
14 species are accepted.

- Athenaea altoserranae I.M.C.Rodrigues & Stehmann
- Athenaea angustifolia (Alm.-Lafetá) I.M.C.Rodrigues & Stehmann
- Athenaea anonacea Sendtn.
- Athenaea brasiliana Hunz.
- Athenaea cuspidata Witasek
- Athenaea fasciculata (Vell.) I.M.C.Rodrigues & Stehmann (synonym Aureliana fasciculata (Vell.) Sendtn.)
- Athenaea hunzikeriana I.M.C.Rodrigues & Stehmann
- Athenaea martiana Sendtn.
- Athenaea picta (Mart.) Sendtn.
- Athenaea pogogena (Moric.) Sendtn.
- Athenaea sellowiana (Sendtn.) I.M.C.Rodrigues & Stehmann
- Athenaea tomentosa (Sendtn.) I.M.C.Rodrigues & Stehmann
- Athenaea velutina (Sendtn.) D'Arcy
- Athenaea wettsteiniana (Witasek) I.M.C.Rodrigues & Stehmann
