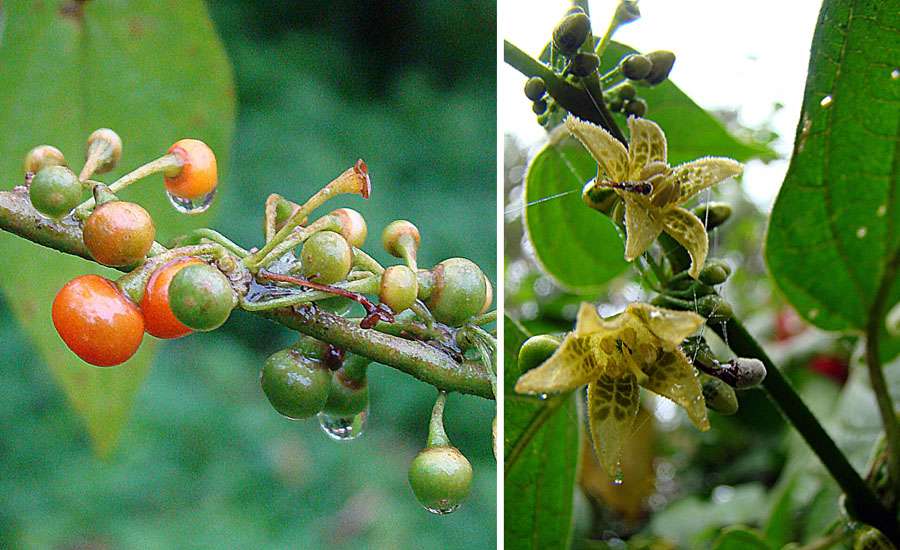
- Witheringia solanacea

Scientific classification
- Kingdom: Plantae
- Clade: Embryophytes
- Clade: Tracheophytes
- Clade: Spermatophytes
- Clade: Angiosperms
- Clade: Eudicots
- Clade: Asterids
- Order: Solanales
- Family: Solanaceae
- Tribe: Physaleae
- Subtribe: Physalinae
- Genus: Witheringia; L'Hér.

Species
- See text

Synonyms
- Sicklera Sendtn.

= Witheringia =

Genus of flowering plants

Witheringia is a genus of flowering plants in the family Solanaceae, with a neotropical distribution. It is closely related to Physalis.

== Species ==
Currently accepted species include:

- Witheringia allogona (Schltdl.) Miers
- Witheringia asterotricha (Standl.) Hunz.
- Witheringia bristaniana D'Arcy
- Witheringia coccoloboides (Dammer) Hunz.
- Witheringia conspersa (Miers) Miers
- Witheringia correana D'Arcy
- Witheringia glabrata (Miers) Miers
- Witheringia hunzikeri D'Arcy
- Witheringia killipiana Hunz.
- Witheringia laxissima (Standl.) D'Arcy
- Witheringia maculata (Standl. & C.V.Morton) Hunz.
- Witheringia meiantha (Donn.Sm.) Hunz.
- Witheringia mexicana (B.L.Rob.) Hunz.
- Witheringia mortonii Hunz.
- Witheringia pogonandra Lem.
- Witheringia solanacea L'Hér.
- Witheringia stellata (Greenm.) Hunz.
- Witheringia wurdackiana Benítez
