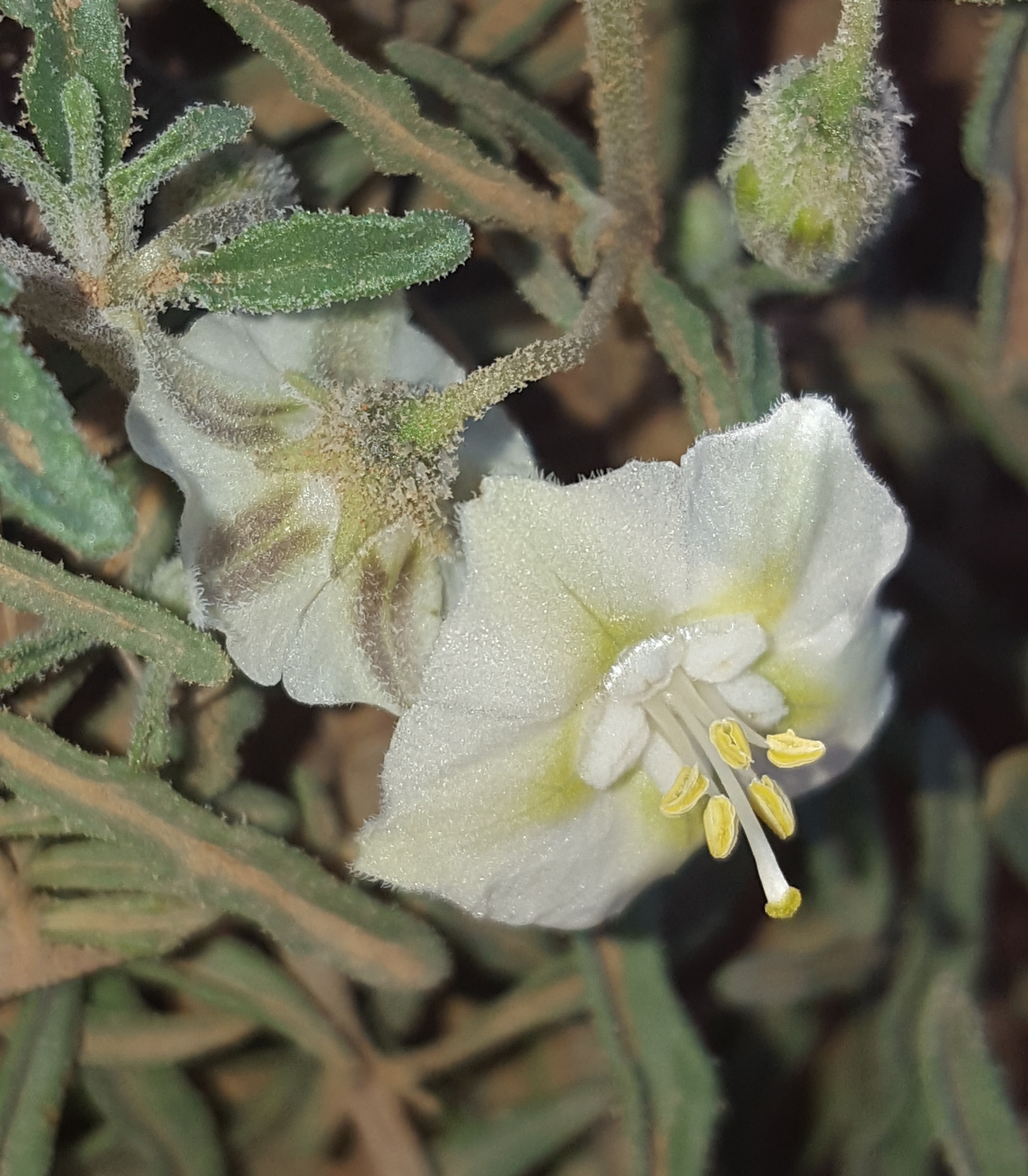

Scientific classification
- Kingdom: Plantae
- Clade: Tracheophytes
- Clade: Angiosperms
- Clade: Eudicots
- Clade: Asterids
- Order: Solanales
- Family: Solanaceae
- Genus: Chamaesaracha
- Species: C. coronopus

Binomial name
- Chamaesaracha coronopus (Dunal) A.Gray

= Chamaesaracha coronopus =

Species of flowering plant

Chamaesaracha coronopus (formerly Solanum coronopus), commonly called greenleaf five eyes, is a plant in the nightshade family (Solanaceae) found in dry open flat areas from southeastern California to Kansas and western Texas.
