= Deprea steyermarkii =

Conservation status
- Endangered (IUCN 3.1)

Scientific classification
- Kingdom: Plantae
- Clade: Tracheophytes
- Clade: Angiosperms
- Clade: Eudicots
- Clade: Asterids
- Order: Solanales
- Family: Solanaceae
- Genus: Deprea
- Species: D. steyermarkii

Binomial name
- Deprea steyermarkii (Hunz.) S.Leiva & Barboza (2015)

Synonyms
- Larnax steyermarkii Hunz. (1977)

Species of flowering plant

Deprea steyermarkii is a species of plant in the family Solanaceae. It is a subshrub endemic to Ecuador.
