= Saracha quitensis =

Conservation status
- Data Deficient (IUCN 3.1)

Scientific classification
- Kingdom: Plantae
- Clade: Tracheophytes
- Clade: Angiosperms
- Clade: Eudicots
- Clade: Asterids
- Order: Solanales
- Family: Solanaceae
- Genus: Saracha
- Species: S. quitensis

Binomial name
- Saracha quitensis (Hook.) Miers (1853)

Synonyms
- Acnistus quitensis (Hook.) Hunz. (1960); Grabowskia sodiroi Bitter (1914); Lycium quitense Hook. (1845); Poecilochroma quitensis (Hook.) Miers (1848); Poecilochroma sodiroi Dammer (1905)

Species of flowering plant

Saracha quitensis is a species of flowering plant in the family Solanaceae. It is a shrub or tree native to Ecuador, Colombia, and northwestern Venezuela.

== Description ==
A spiny shrub up to 3.5m in height; leaves dark green above; calyx teeth pubescent; corolla pale yellow, campanulate; filaments pale yellow, anthers greenish-purple; style pale, stigma green; fruit a turbinate berry.
