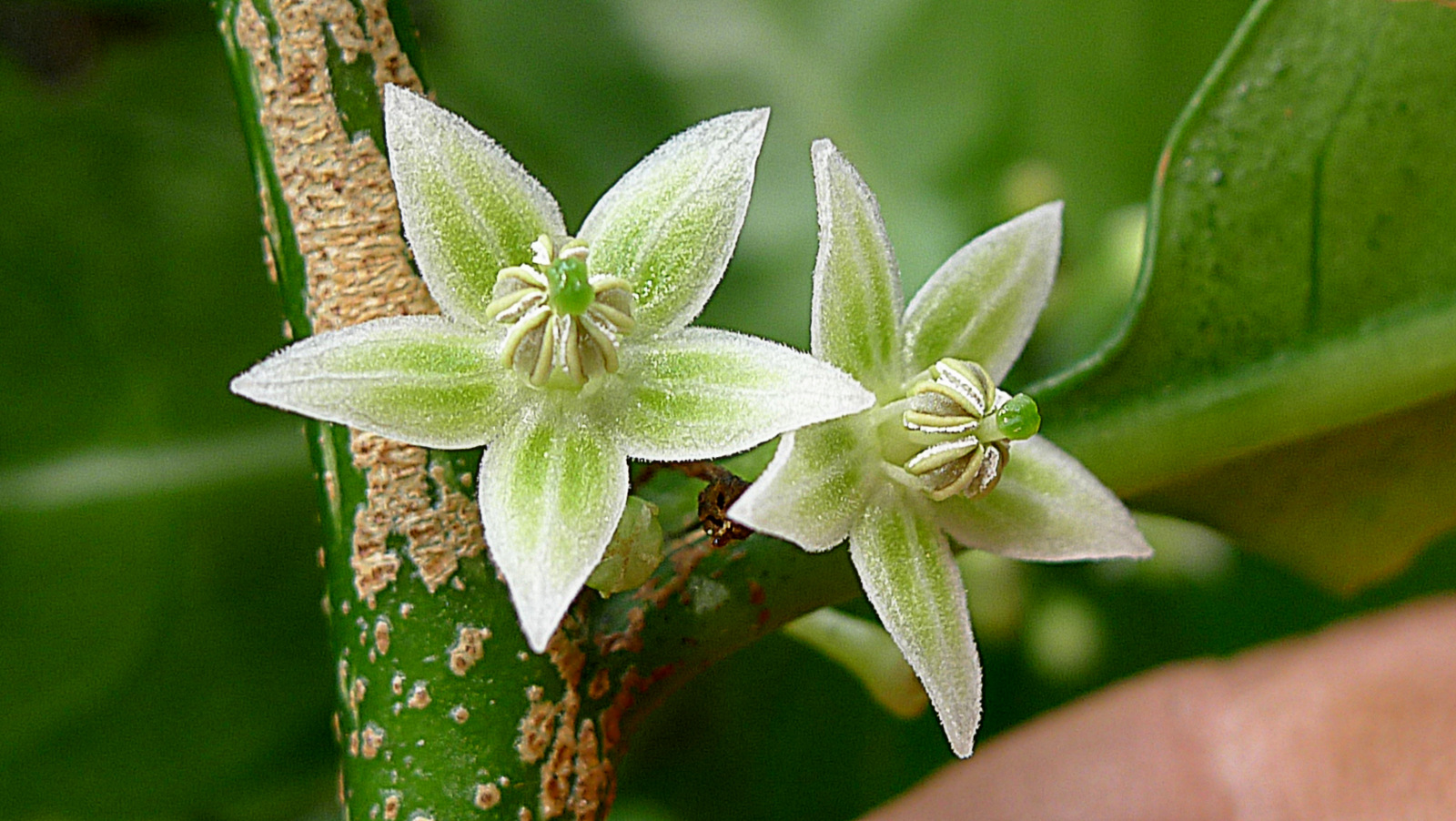

Conservation status
- Conservation Dependent (IUCN 2.3)

Scientific classification
- Kingdom: Plantae
- Clade: Tracheophytes
- Clade: Angiosperms
- Clade: Eudicots
- Clade: Asterids
- Order: Solanales
- Family: Solanaceae
- Genus: Athenaea
- Species: A. fasciculata

Binomial name
- Athenaea fasciculata (Vell.) I.M.C.Rodrigues & Stehmann (2019)

Synonyms
- Synonymy: Aureliana darcyi Carvalho & Bovini (1995); Aureliana fasciculata (Vell.) Sendtn. (1846); Aureliana fasciculata var. longifolia (Sendtn.) Hunz. & Barboza (1990 publ. 1991); Aureliana fasciculata var. tomentella (Sendtn.) Barboza & Hunz. (1990 publ. 1991); Aureliana glomuliflora Sendtn. (1846); Aureliana glomuliflora var. longifolia Sendtn. (1846); Aureliana lucida (Moric.) Sendtn. (1846); Aureliana lucida var. tomentella Sendtn. (1846); Bassovia fasciculata (Vell.) Dunal (1852); Bassovia glomuliflora Dunal (1852); Bassovia glomuliflora var. longifolia (Sendtn.) Dunal (1852); Bassovia hebepoda Dunal (1852); Bassovia lucida (Moric.) Dunal (1852); Bassovia lucida var. celastroides (Sendtn. ex Mart.) Dunal (1852); Bassovia lucida var. pilosulum Dunal (1852); Bassovia lucida var. rufescens Dunal (1852); Bassovia lucida var. tomentella (Sendtn.) Edwall (1897); Capsicum fasciculatum (Vell.) Kuntze (1891), nom. illeg.; Capsicum glomuliflorum (Sendtn.) Kuntze (1891); Capsicum hebepodum (Dunal) Kuntze (1891); Capsicum lucidum (Moric.) Kuntze (1891); Solanum celastroides Sendtn. ex Mart. (1841); Solanum fasciculatum Vell. (1829) (basionym); Solanum lucidum Moric. (1837); Solanum monanthos Dunal (1852)

= Athenaea fasciculata =

Species of flowering plant

Athenaea fasciculata is a species of flowering plant in the family Solanaceae. It is a shrub or tree which grows in the coastal Atlantic Forest of eastern Brazil, and ranges inland to northeastern Argentina, Paraguay, and Bolivia.

It is threatened by habitat loss.
