= Deprea psilophyta =

Conservation status
- Vulnerable (IUCN 3.1)

Scientific classification
- Kingdom: Plantae
- Clade: Tracheophytes
- Clade: Angiosperms
- Clade: Eudicots
- Clade: Asterids
- Order: Solanales
- Family: Solanaceae
- Genus: Deprea
- Species: D. psilophyta

Binomial name
- Deprea psilophyta (N.W.Sawyer) S.Leiva & Deanna (2015)

Synonyms
- Larnax psilophyta N.W.Sawyer (1998)

Species of flowering plant

Deprea psilophyta is a species of flowering plant in the family Solanaceae. It is endemic to Ecuador. It was first described as Larnax psilophyta in 1998 by N. W. Sawyer, and was placed in genus Deprea in 2015.
