= Asimina × piedmontana =

Scientific classification
- Kingdom: Plantae
- Clade: Tracheophytes
- Clade: Angiosperms
- Clade: Magnoliids
- Order: Magnoliales
- Family: Annonaceae
- Genus: Asimina
- Species: A. × piedmontana

Binomial name
- Asimina × piedmontana C.N.Horn (2015)

Hybrid species of flowering plant

Asimina × piedmontana, known as the Piedmont hybrid pawpaw, is a hybrid species of pawpaw. It is a cross between the species Asimina triloba and Asimina parviflora.

== Description ==
Asimina × piedmontana is most easily identified by its flowers, which start out light green, and mature to dark burgundy, growing larger and opening wider as they do so. When fully mature, the flowers are an intermediate size between Asimina triloba and Asimina parviflora.

Like Asimina parviflora, the hybrid flowers at a shorter height, and forms shrubs rather than trees, which helps to differentiate it from Asimina triloba, which forms larger tree trunks, and flowers when much older and taller.

== Taxonomy and etymology ==
The hybrid was described by botanist Charles Norman Horn in 2015.

The hybrid is named "piedmontana" after the Piedmont region in the United States. It is most commonly found in North Carolina, South Carolina, Georgia, and Alabama, as the ranges of A. triloba and A. parviflora overlap there most heavily.
