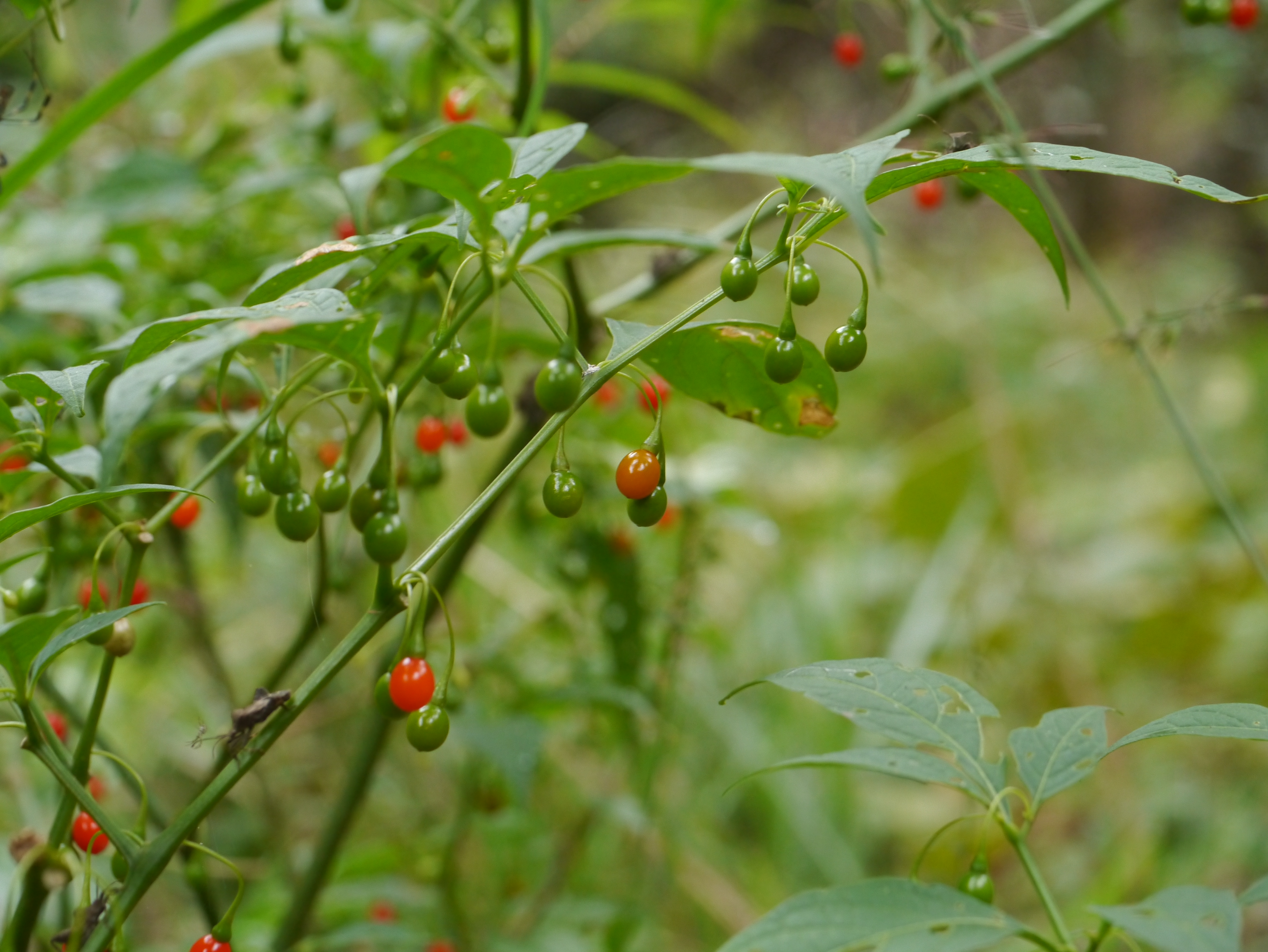
- Tubocapsicum anomalum

Scientific classification
- Kingdom: Plantae
- Clade: Tracheophytes
- Clade: Angiosperms
- Clade: Eudicots
- Clade: Asterids
- Order: Solanales
- Family: Solanaceae
- Subfamily: Solanoideae
- Tribe: Physaleae
- Genus: Tubocapsicum; Makino

= Tubocapsicum =

Genus of flowering plants

Tubocapsicum is a genus of flowering plants belonging to the family Solanaceae.

Its native range is Tropical Asia and Temperate Asia.

Species:

- Tubocapsicum anomalum (Franch. & Sav.) Makino
- Tubocapsicum boninense (Koidz.) Koidz. ex H.Hara
