= Deprea =

Scientific classification
- Kingdom: Plantae
- Clade: Tracheophytes
- Clade: Angiosperms
- Clade: Eudicots
- Clade: Asterids
- Order: Solanales
- Family: Solanaceae
- Genus: Deprea; Raf. (1838)

Synonyms
- Larnax Miers (1849)

Genus of flowering plants

Deprea is a genus of flowering plants belonging to the family Solanaceae.

It includes 55 species native to the tropical Americas, ranging from Costa Rica to Venezuela, Northern Brazil, and Bolivia.

The genus name of Deprea is in honour of Alexandre-Armand Desprez (1747–1829), a French doctor and botanist.

== Species ==
55 species are accepted.

- Deprea abra-patriciae (S.Leiva & Barboza) S.Leiva & Deanna
- Deprea altomayoensis (S.Leiva & Quip.) Barboza & Deanna
- Deprea andersonii (N.W.Sawyer) Deanna & S.Leiva
- Deprea auccana S.Leiva, Barboza & Deanna
- Deprea bitteriana (Werderm.) Sawyer & Benítez
- Deprea bongaraensis (S.Leiva) Deanna & Barboza
- Deprea cardenasiana Hunz.
- Deprea chotanae (S.Leiva, Pereyra & Barboza) S.Leiva
- Deprea cuyacensis (N.W.Sawyer & S.Leiva) S.Leiva & Lezama
- Deprea cyanocarpa Garzón & C.I.Orozco
- Deprea darcyana (N.W.Sawyer) Barboza & S.Leiva
- Deprea dilloniana (S.Leiva, Quip. & N.W.Sawyer) Barboza
- Deprea ecuatoriana Hunz. & Barboza
- Deprea glabra (Standl.) Hunz.
- Deprea grandiflora (N.W.Sawyer & S.Leiva) Deanna & Barboza
- Deprea harlingiana (Hunz. & Barboza) S.Leiva & Deanna
- Deprea hawkesii (Hunz.) Deanna
- Deprea kann-rasmussenii (S.Leiva & Quip.) S.Leiva & Barboza
- Deprea longicalyx E.Rodr., S.Leiva & J.Campos
- Deprea longipedunculata (S.Leiva, E.Rodr. & J.Campos) Barboza
- Deprea lutea (S.Leiva) Deanna
- Deprea macasiana (Deanna, S.Leiva & Barboza) Barboza
- Deprea macrocalyx (S.Leiva, E.Rodr. & J.Campos) S.Leiva, E.Rodr. & J.Campos
- Deprea maculatifolia (E.Rodr. & S.Leiva) S.Leiva
- Deprea micrantha S.Leiva & Barboza
- Deprea nieva (S.Leiva & N.W.Sawyer) Barboza & Deanna
- Deprea nubicola N.W.Sawyer
- Deprea orinocensis (Kunth) Raf.
- Deprea oxapampensis M.A.Cueva & Treviño
- Deprea paneroi C.Benítez de Rojas & M.Martínez
- Deprea parviflora (N.W.Sawyer & S.Leiva) S.Leiva
- Deprea pauciflora Deanna, Barboza & S.Leiva
- Deprea pecaensis S.Leiva, Deanna & Barboza
- Deprea pedrazae (S.Leiva & Barboza) Deanna & S.Leiva
- Deprea peruviana (Zahlbr.) S.Leiva & Barboza
- Deprea physalidicalyx S.Leiva, Barboza & Deanna
- Deprea pilosa (S.Leiva, E.Rodr. & J.Campos) Deanna
- Deprea pomacochaensis (S.Leiva) Barboza
- Deprea psilophyta (N.W.Sawyer) S.Leiva & Deanna
- Deprea pumila (S.Leiva, Barboza & Deanna) S.Leiva
- Deprea purpurea (S.Leiva) Barboza & S.Leiva
- Deprea purpureocarpa (S.Leiva, Deanna & Barboza) Deanna
- Deprea sachapapa (Hunz.) S.Leiva & Deanna
- Deprea sagasteguii (S.Leiva, Quip. & N.W.Sawyer) Barboza
- Deprea sapalachensis S.Leiva & Barboza
- Deprea sawyeriana (S.Leiva, E.Rodr. & J.Campos) S.Leiva
- Deprea schjellerupiae (S.Leiva & Quip.) Barboza & Deanna
- Deprea steyermarkii (Hunz.) S.Leiva & Barboza
- Deprea subtriflora (Ruiz & Pav.) D'Arcy
- Deprea sylvarum (Standl. & C.V.Morton) Hunz.
- Deprea teresitae Deanna & A.Orejuela
- Deprea toledoana (Barboza & S.Leiva) Barboza
- Deprea vasquezii (S.Leiva, E.Rodr. & J.Campos) Deanna
- Deprea zakii Barboza, S.Leiva & Deanna
- Deprea zamorae Barboza & S.Leiva
