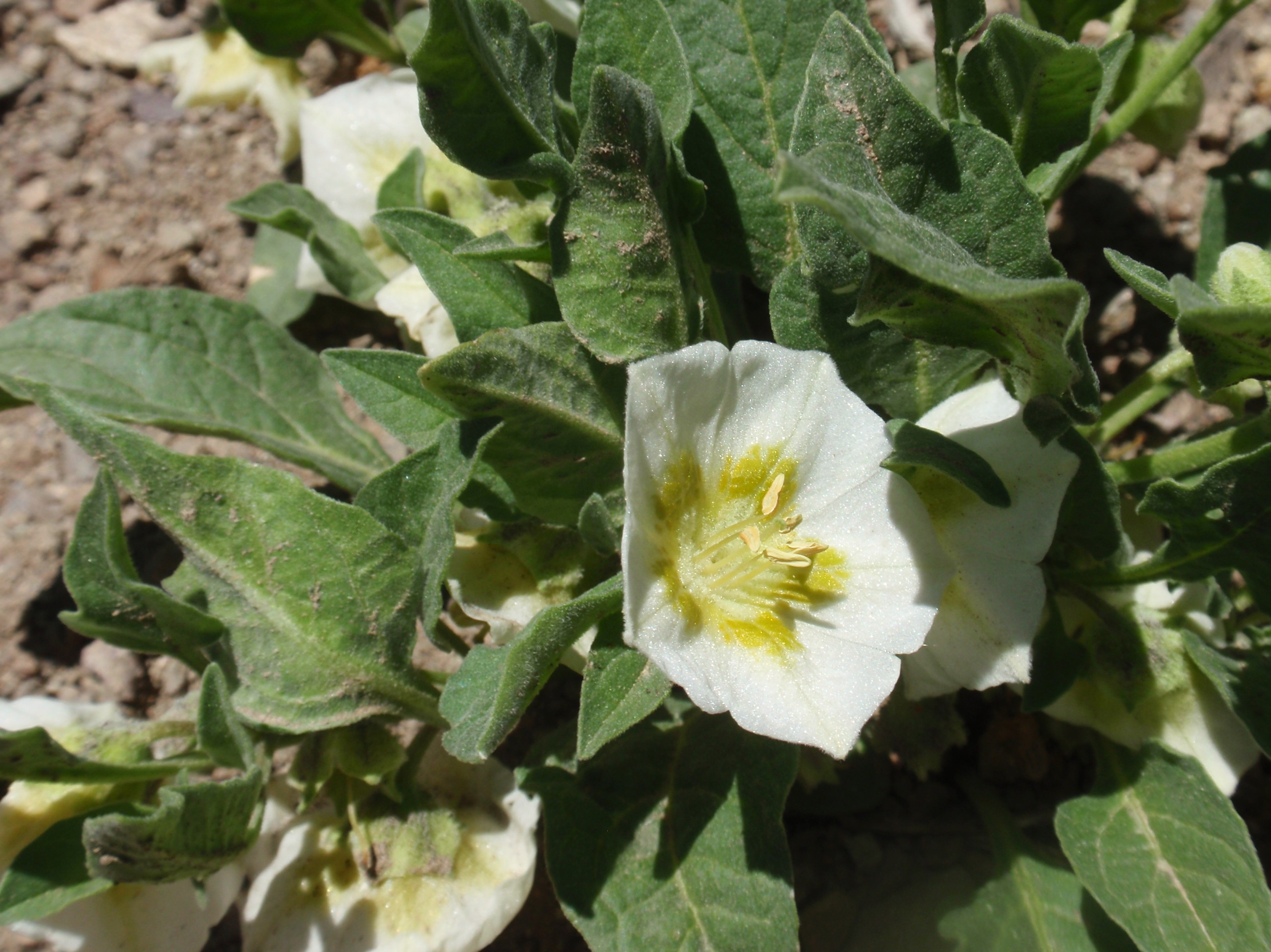
- Chamaesaracha nana

Scientific classification
- Kingdom: Plantae
- Clade: Tracheophytes
- Clade: Angiosperms
- Clade: Eudicots
- Clade: Asterids
- Order: Solanales
- Family: Solanaceae
- Subfamily: Solanoideae
- Tribe: Physaleae
- Genus: Chamaesaracha (Gray) Benth.

Species
- 9 — see text

= Chamaesaracha =

Genus of flowering plants

Chamaesaracha is a genus of perennial herbs in the nightshade family which are known commonly as five eyes. There are around nine species of five eyes, and they are native to the southwestern and western United States and parts of Mexico. These are hairy plants growing low to the ground and covered in crinkly dull green leaves. The flowers are star-shaped to wheel-shaped and their dried remnants can be found around the fruits, which are spherical berries filled with flat, kidney-shaped seeds.

Selected species:

- Chamaesaracha coniodes — gray five eyes
- Chamaesaracha coronopus — greenleaf five eyes
- Chamaesaracha crenata — toothed five eyes
- Chamaesaracha edwardsiana — Edwards Plateau five eyes
- Chamaesaracha geohintonii
- Chamaesaracha pallida — pale five eyes
- Chamaesaracha nana — dwarf chamaesaracha
- Chamaesaracha sordida — hairy five eyes
- Chamaesaracha villosa — TransPecos five eyes
