= Discopodium =

Scientific classification
- Kingdom: Plantae
- Clade: Tracheophytes
- Clade: Angiosperms
- Clade: Eudicots
- Clade: Asterids
- Order: Solanales
- Family: Solanaceae
- Genus: Discopodium; Hochst.

Genus of plants

Discopodium is a genus of flowering plants belonging to the family Solanaceae.

Its native range is Tropical Africa.

Species:

- Discopodium eremanthum Chiov.
- Discopodium penninervium Hochst.
