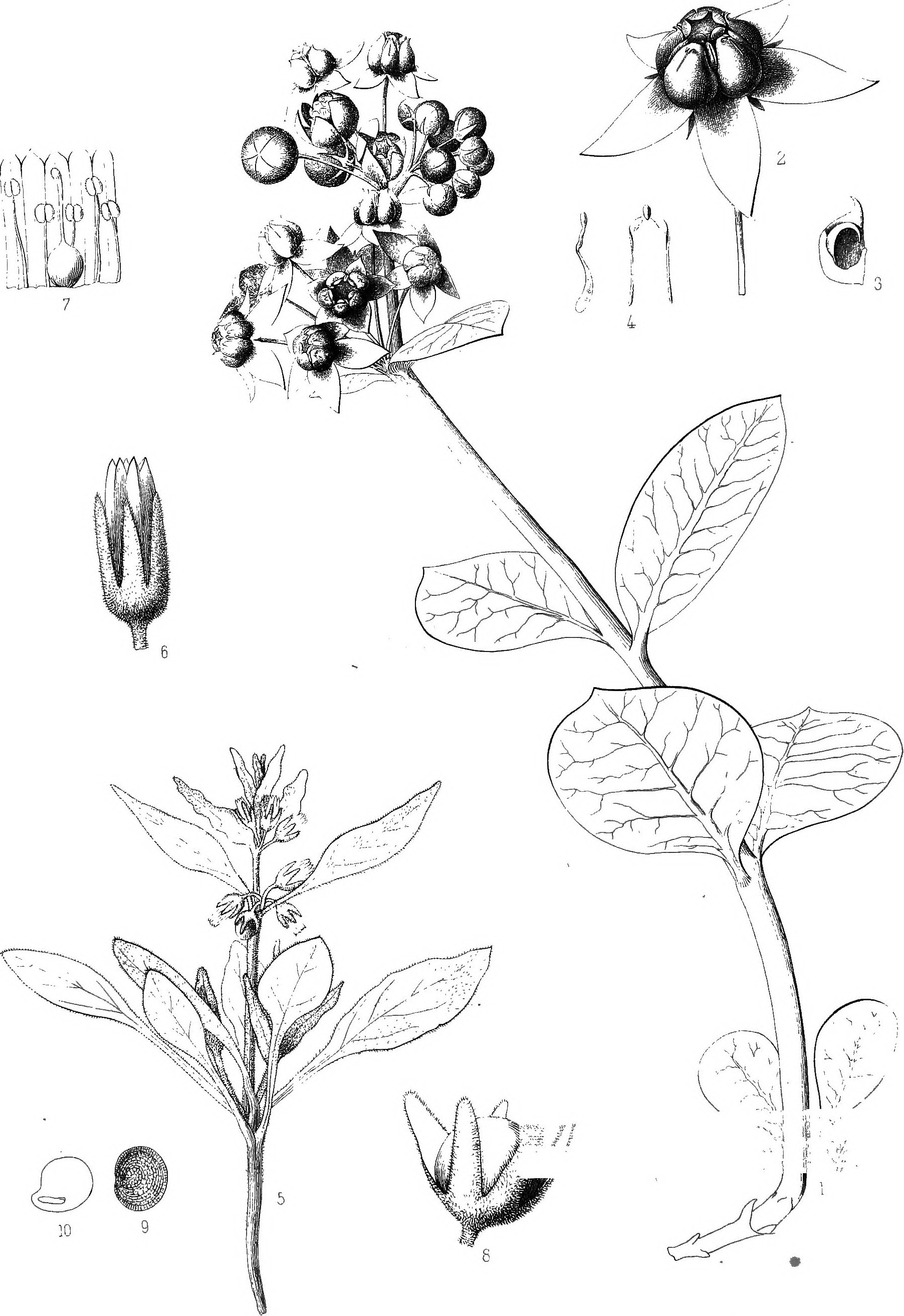

Scientific classification
- Kingdom: Plantae
- Clade: Tracheophytes
- Clade: Angiosperms
- Clade: Eudicots
- Clade: Asterids
- Order: Solanales
- Family: Solanaceae
- Subfamily: Solanoideae
- Tribe: Physaleae
- Genus: Oryctes; S.Watson
- Species: O. nevadensis

Binomial name
- Oryctes nevadensis S.Watson

= Oryctes nevadensis =

Species of flowering plant

Oryctes is a genus of flowering plants in the nightshade family containing the single species Oryctes nevadensis, which is known by the common name Nevada oryctes. This rare plant is native to a small area of desert straddling the California - Nevada border, where it grows in habitat with deep sand. It is difficult to estimate its abundance because the plant is only seen in years with certain rainfall amounts and temperature ranges. This is a small annual herb growing from a taproot and producing sticky, scaly foliage, growing up to about 20 centimeters in maximum height. The leaves are 1 to 3 centimeters long, linear in shape to oval and divided into lobes, sometimes wavy along the edges. The inflorescences are umbels of a few tiny flowers each, emerging from leaf axils. The flower is purplish and rounded into an urn shape, measuring a few millimeters wide. The fruit is a spherical capsule containing several seeds. The plant typically flowers in the spring months of April, May and June.

This species has neither federal or state government level species protection status but, is recognized globally with G3 - vulnerable status indicating its moderate risk for global extinction and S2 - imperiled status within California state borders recognizing the plant's high risk for extirpation. These classifications are due to its restricted range, small occurrences of populations, population declines, threats and/or other impacts. It also has a 2B California rare plant ranking, indicating that its populations are rare or endangered in California but are common in other locales. This species has not been seed banked but has been recorded in the California Natural Diversity Database (CNDDB).
