= Cuatresia =

Scientific classification
- Kingdom: Plantae
- Clade: Tracheophytes
- Clade: Angiosperms
- Clade: Eudicots
- Clade: Asterids
- Order: Solanales
- Family: Solanaceae
- Genus: Cuatresia; Hunz.

Genus of flowering plants

Cuatresia is a genus of flowering plants belonging to the family Solanaceae.

Its native range is Central and Southern Tropical America.

Species:

- Cuatresia amistadensis D.A.Soto & A.K.Monro
- Cuatresia anomala N.W.Sawyer & C.I.Orozco
- Cuatresia colombiana Hunz.
- Cuatresia cuneata (Standl.) Bohs
- Cuatresia cuspidata (Dunal) Hunz.
- Cuatresia exiguiflora (D'Arcy) Hunz.
- Cuatresia foreroi Hunz.
- Cuatresia fosteriana Hunz.
- Cuatresia garciae Hunz.
- Cuatresia glomeruflorula Canal & C.I.Orozco
- Cuatresia harlingiana Hunz.
- Cuatresia hunzikeriana (Benítez & M.Martínez) N.W.Sawyer
- Cuatresia morii (D'Arcy) Sousa-Peña ex Bohs
- Cuatresia physalana C.I.Orozco & W.Vargas
- Cuatresia plowmanii Hunz.
- Cuatresia riparia (Kunth) Hunz.
- Cuatresia trianae Hunz.
