= Brachistus =

Scientific classification
- Kingdom: Plantae
- Clade: Tracheophytes
- Clade: Angiosperms
- Clade: Eudicots
- Clade: Asterids
- Order: Solanales
- Family: Solanaceae
- Genus: Brachistus; Miers

Genus of flowering plants

Brachistus is a genus of flowering plants belonging to tribe Physaleae of subfamily Solanoideae of the nightshade family,Solanaceae.

Its native range is Mexico to Central America.

Species:

- Brachistus knappiae Mont.-Castro & Sousa-Peña
- Brachistus nelsonii (Fernald) D'Arcy, J.L.Gentry & Averett
- Brachistus stramoniifolius (Kunth) Miers
