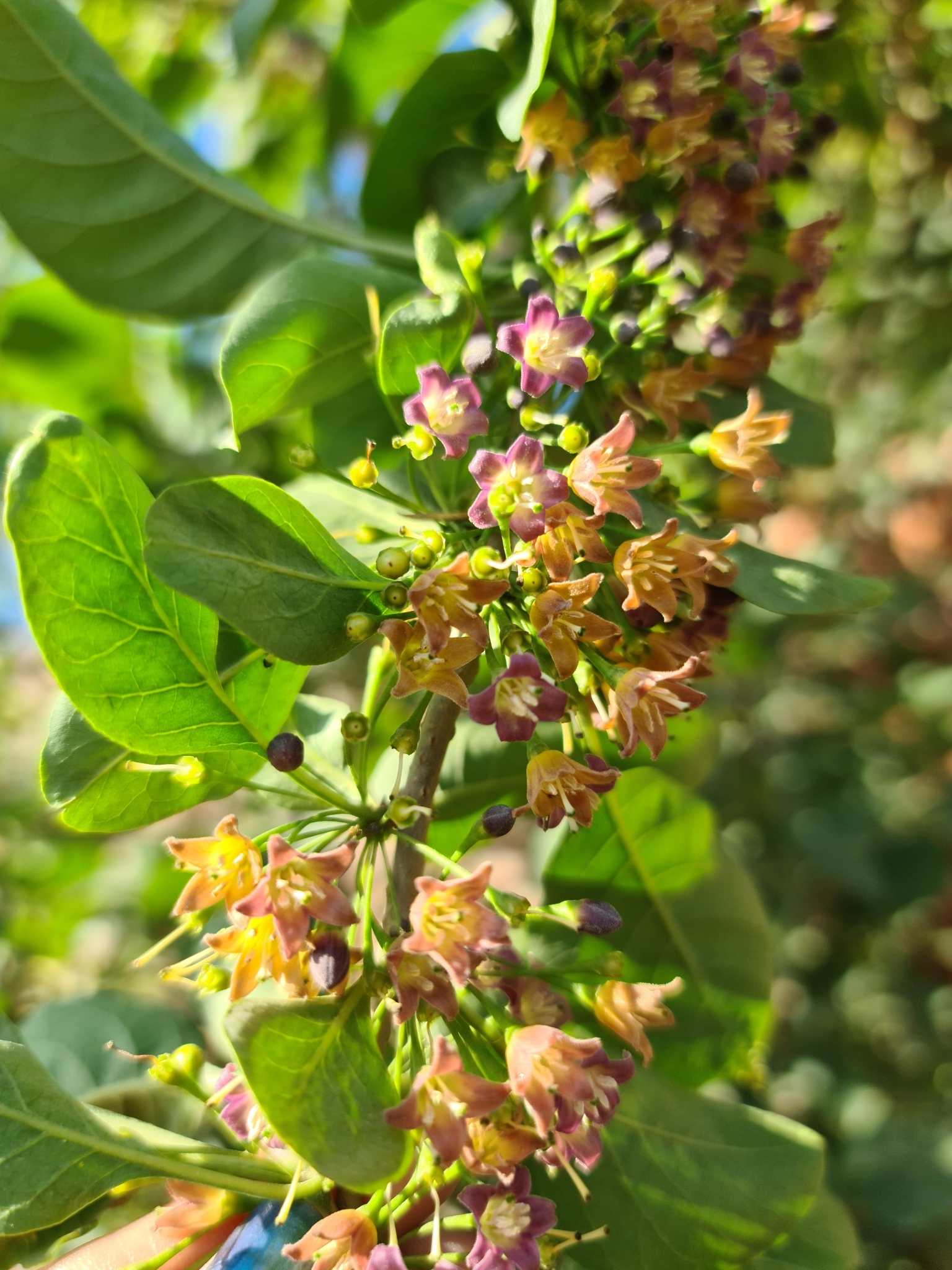
- Vassobia breviflora

Scientific classification
- Kingdom: Plantae
- Clade: Tracheophytes
- Clade: Angiosperms
- Clade: Eudicots
- Clade: Asterids
- Order: Solanales
- Family: Solanaceae
- Subfamily: Solanoideae
- Tribe: Physaleae
- Genus: Vassobia; Rusby

= Vassobia =

Genus of flowering plants

Vassobia is a genus of flowering plants belonging to the family Solanaceae.

Its native range is South America.

Species:

- Vassobia breviflora (Sendtn.) Hunz.
- Vassobia dichotoma (Rusby) Bitter
