= Michel Félix Dunal =

French botanist (1789–1856)

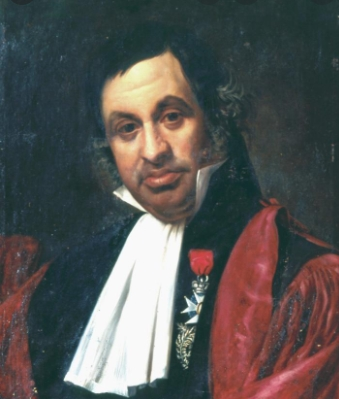
- Portrait of M-F Dunal at Academy of Sciences and Letters of Montpellier
- Born: October 24, 1789; Montpellier, Kingdom of France
- Died: July 29, 1856 (aged 66); Montpellier, France
- Known for: Solanorum generumque affinium Synopsis seu Solanorum Historia
- Scientific career
- Institutions: University of Montpellier
- Author abbrev. (botany): Dunal

Michel Félix Dunal (24 October 1789 in Montpellier – 29 July 1856 in Montpellier) was a French botanist. He was a professor of botany in Montpellier, France.

He held the chair of natural history at the University of Montpellier from 1816 until his death in 1856. The Solanaceous plant genus Dunalia is named after him, as is the green algae genus Dunaliella.

He is especially known for his work with the genus Solanum, and published an important work on the genus; Solanorum generumque affinium Synopsis seu Solanorum Historiae, editionis secundae summarium ad characteres differentiales redactum, seriem naturalem, habitationes stationesque specierum breviter indicans, Montpellier, 1816.

For the work Prodromus systematis naturalis regni vegetabilis by Augustin de Candolle and his son, Alphonse Pyrame de Candolle, he contributed to Volume I of 1824 "Cistineae" (modern Cistaceae), to Volume VII, No. 2 of 1839 "Vaccinieae", and to Volume XIII No. 1 of 1852 "Solanaceae". Its publication in 1852 was the last taxonomic treatment of the genus Solanum in its entirety. This also includes a first attempt to divide the species of Solanum into sections. Starting points were morphological features such as the shape of the anthers and the presence or absence of spines.

== Honours ==
The genus name of Dunalia (5 species of plant found in South America) is in honour of Dunal, the genus was published in F.W.H.von Humboldt, A.J.A.Bonpland & C.S.Kunth, Nov. Gen. Sp. Vol.3 on page 55 in 1818.

== Complete Bibliography ==
- on WorldCat
