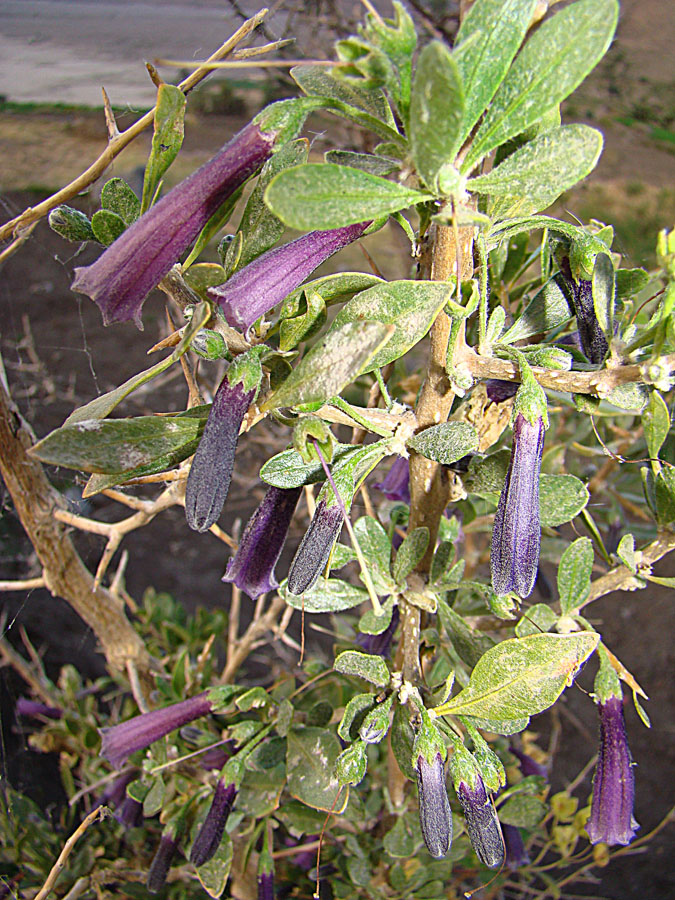
- Dunalia spinosa

Scientific classification
- Kingdom: Plantae
- Clade: Embryophytes
- Clade: Tracheophytes
- Clade: Spermatophytes
- Clade: Angiosperms
- Clade: Eudicots
- Clade: Asterids
- Order: Solanales
- Family: Solanaceae
- Genus: Dunalia; Kunth

Synonyms
- Dierbachia Spreng. Huanuca Raf. Lycioplesium Miers

= Dunalia =

Genus of plants

Dunalia is a genus of flowering plants belonging to the family Solanaceae.

Its native range is western and southern South America, and it is found in Argentina, Bolivia, Chile, Colombia, Ecuador and Peru.

The genus name of Dunalia is in honour of Michel Félix Dunal (1789–1856), a French botanist, the genus was published in F.W.H.von Humboldt, A.J.A.Bonpland & C.S.Kunth, Nov. Gen. Sp. Vol.3 on page 55 in 1818.

Known species:

- Dunalia brachyacantha Miers
- Dunalia dombeyana (Dunal) J.F.Macbr.
- Dunalia obovata (Ruiz & Pav.) Dammer
- Dunalia spathulata (Ruiz & Pav.) A.Braun & Asch.
- Dunalia spinosa (Meyen) Dammer
