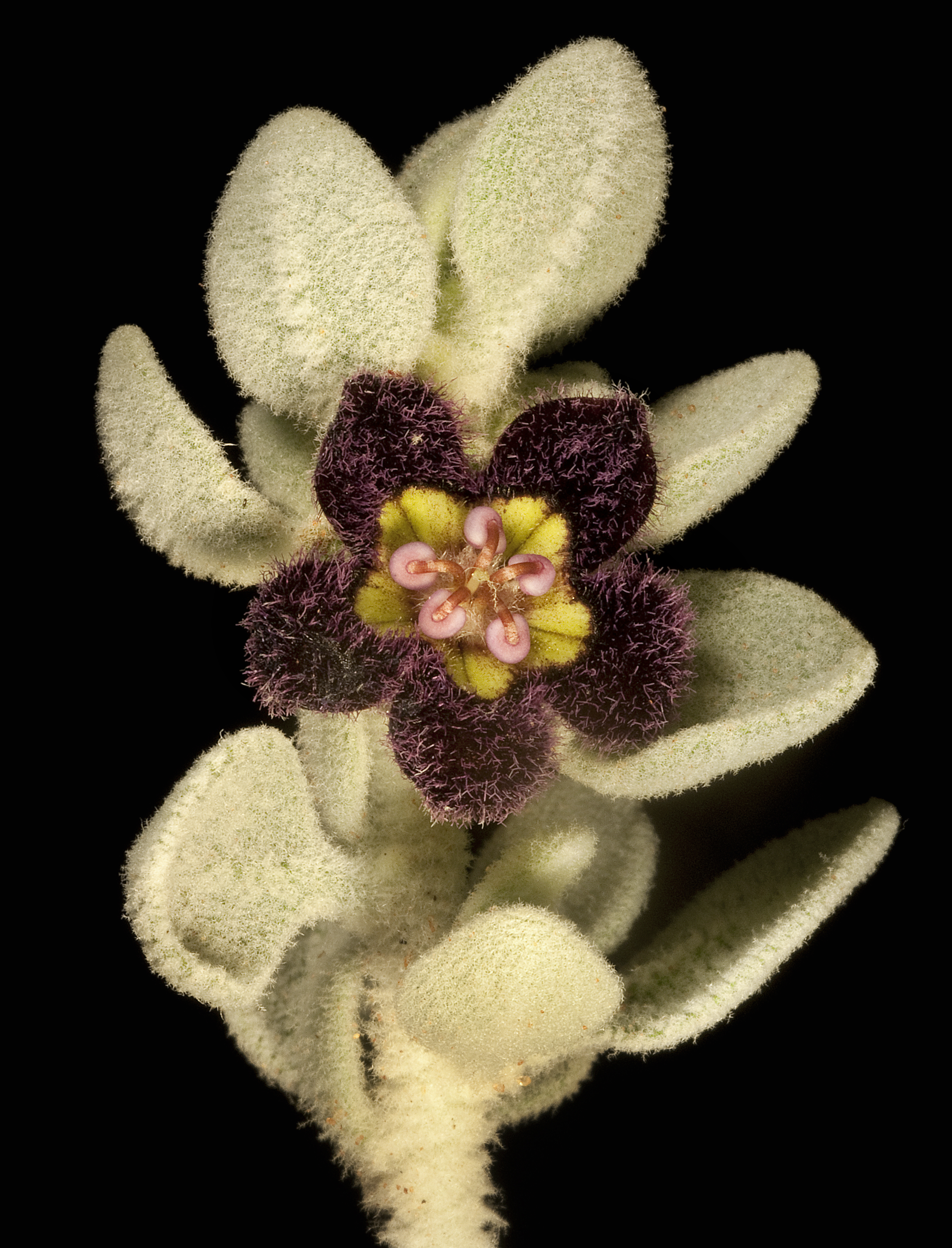

Scientific classification
- Kingdom: Plantae
- Clade: Tracheophytes
- Clade: Angiosperms
- Clade: Eudicots
- Clade: Asterids
- Order: Solanales
- Family: Solanaceae
- Genus: Anthotroche
- Species: A. pannosa

Binomial name
- Anthotroche pannosa Endl.

Synonyms
- Anthotroche blackii F.Muell. Anthotroche healiana F.Muell.

= Anthotroche pannosa =

Species of flowering plant

Anthotroche pannosa (common name - felted Anthotroche) is an erect or sprawling shrub in the family Solanaceae. It is found in Western Australia.

Anthotroche pannosa is an erect or prostrate shrub, growing from 10 cm to 2.5 m high, growing on sandy soils, on sandplains or in low lying saline areas.

The species was first described in 1839 by Stephan Endlicher.
