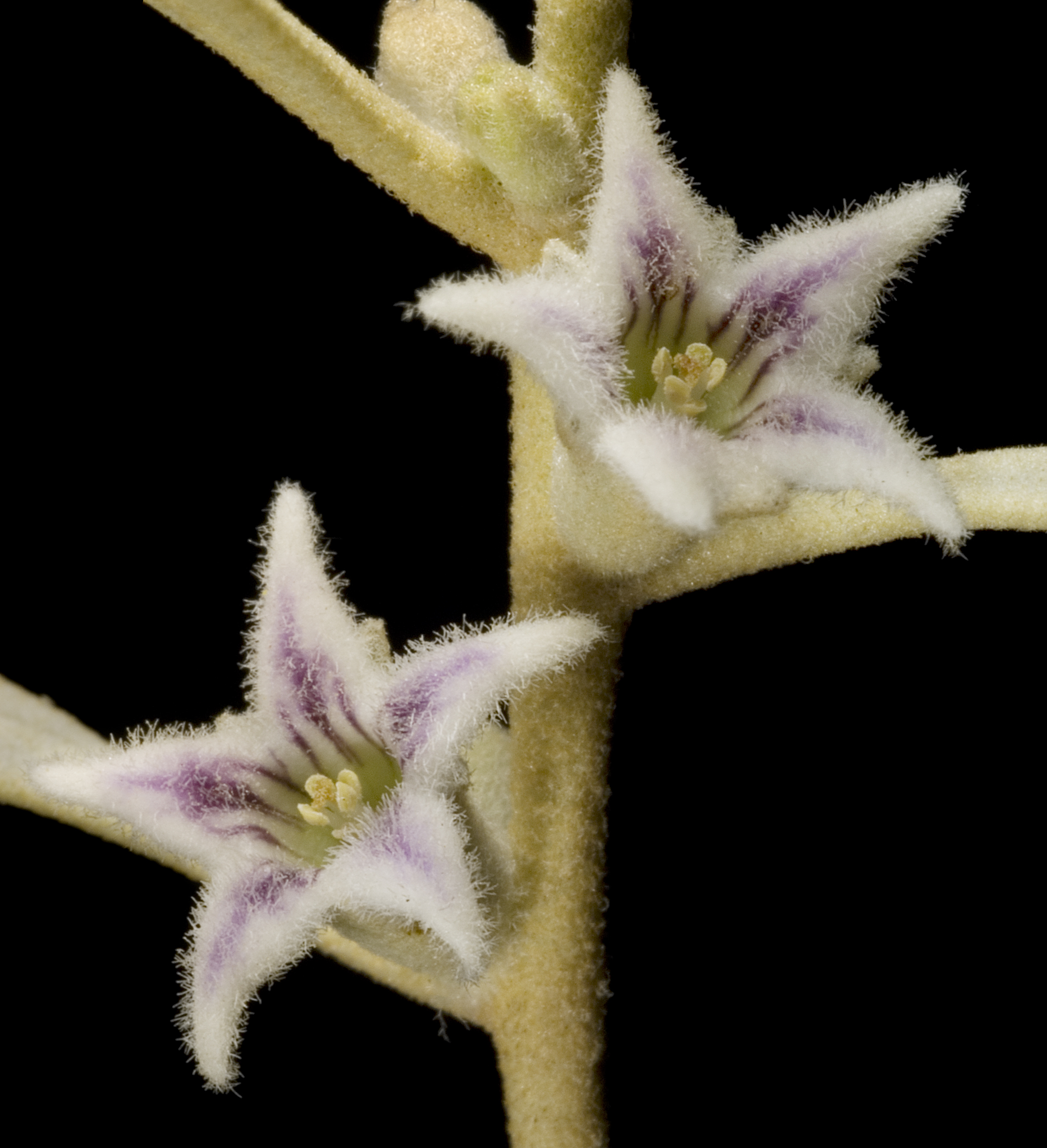

Scientific classification
- Kingdom: Plantae
- Clade: Tracheophytes
- Clade: Angiosperms
- Clade: Eudicots
- Clade: Asterids
- Order: Solanales
- Family: Solanaceae
- Genus: Anthotroche
- Species: A. myoporoides

Binomial name
- Anthotroche myoporoides C.A.Gardner

= Anthotroche myoporoides =

Species of flowering plant

Anthotroche myoporoides is a plant species in the family Solanaceae, native to Western Australia. It was first described in 1943 by Charles Gardner.

It is an intricately branched shrub, with white-cream-green flowers from August to January, and growing to heights of 60 cm to 3 m. on red or yellow sand.
