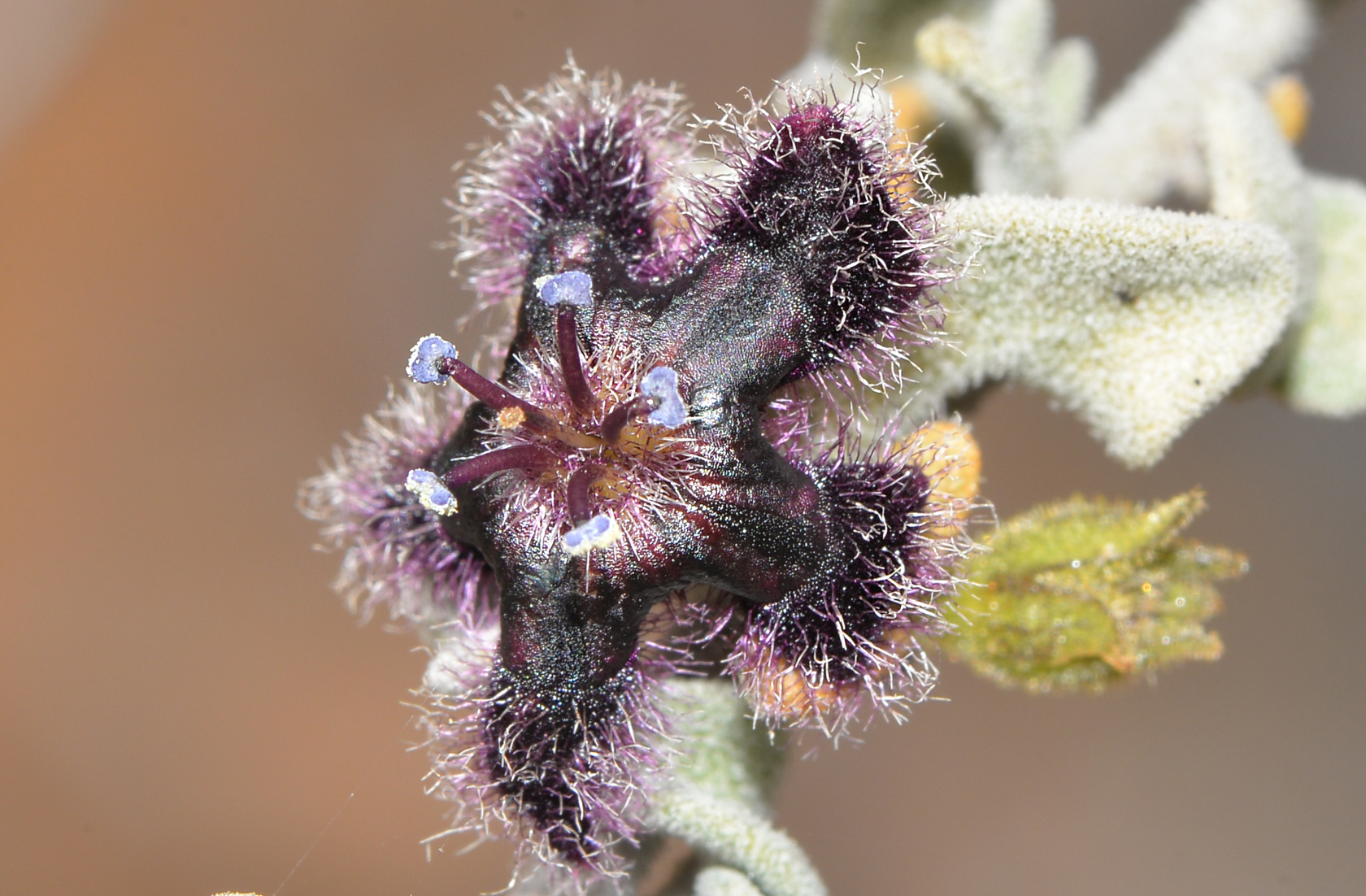

Scientific classification
- Kingdom: Plantae
- Clade: Tracheophytes
- Clade: Angiosperms
- Clade: Eudicots
- Clade: Asterids
- Order: Solanales
- Family: Solanaceae
- Genus: Anthotroche
- Species: A. walcottii

Binomial name
- Anthotroche walcottii F.Muell.

= Anthotroche walcottii =

Species of flowering plant

Anthotroche walcottii is a small to medium hardy shrub with attractive purple and white star shaped flowers. It is native to sandy areas of Western Australia and has some tolerance of salt spray. Grow from seed.
