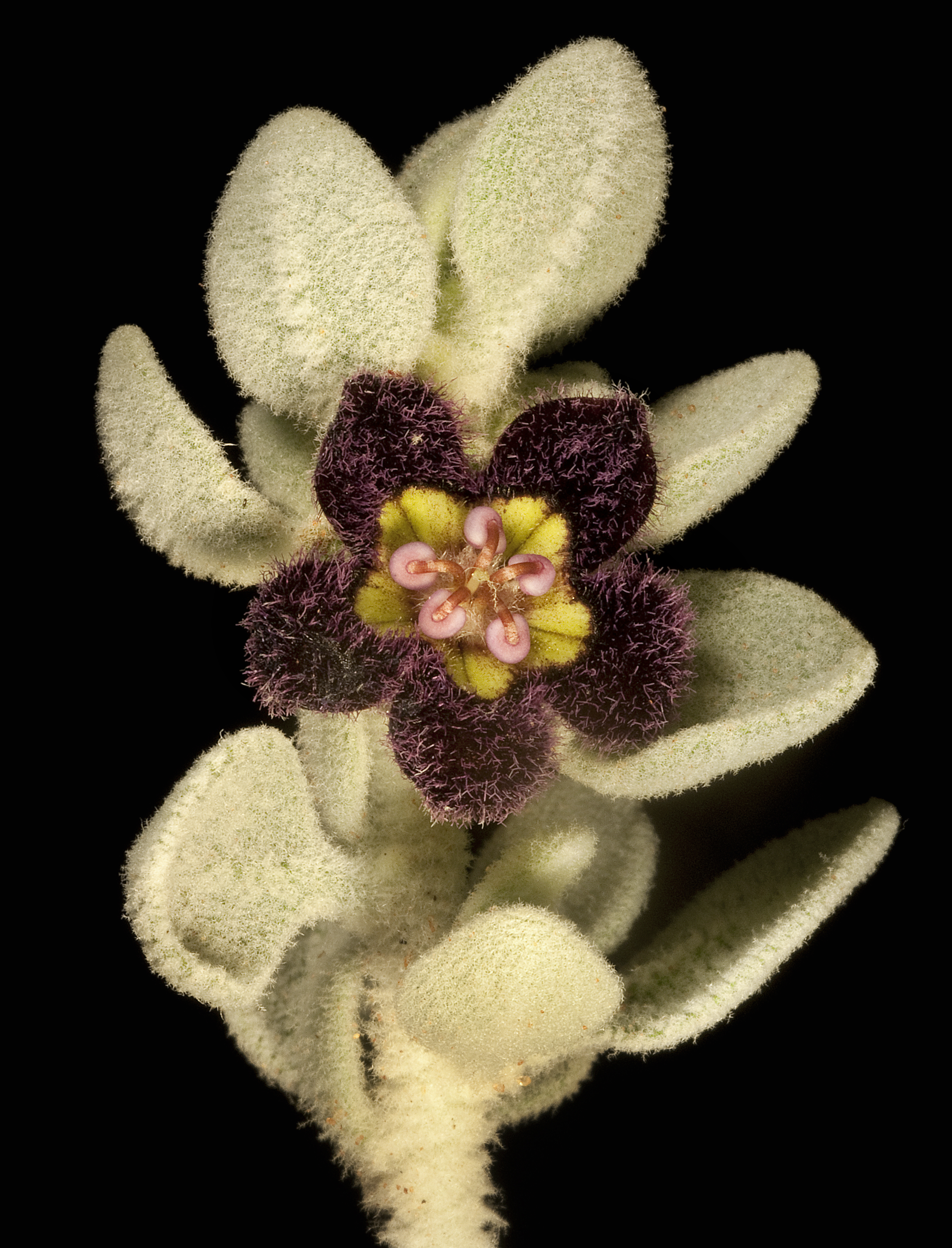
- Anthotroche pannosa

Scientific classification
- Kingdom: Plantae
- Clade: Tracheophytes
- Clade: Angiosperms
- Clade: Eudicots
- Clade: Asterids
- Order: Solanales
- Family: Solanaceae
- Subfamily: Nicotianoideae
- Tribe: Anthocercideae
- Genus: Anthotroche; Endl.

Species
- See text

= Anthotroche =

Genus of flowering plants

Anthotroche is a genus of shrubs in the family Solanaceae. The genus is endemic to Western Australia.

Species include:

- Anthotroche myoporoides - Myoporum-like anthotroche C.A.Gardner
- Anthotroche pannosa - Endl. Felted anthotroche
- Anthotroche walcottii F.Muell.

The genus was first formally described by Austrian botanist Stephan Endlicher in 1839 in Novarum Stirpium Decades. The type species is Anthotroche pannosa.
