= Bibliography of code-switching =

The bibliography of code-switching comprises all academic and peer-reviewed works on the topic of code-switching. It is sorted by category, then alphabetically.

== General theories ==
- Bhatia, Tej K. and William Ritchie. (2009). "Language Mixing, Universal Grammar and Second Language Acquisition". In: The New Handbook of Second Language Acquisition. William C. Ritchie and Tej K. Bhatia (eds.), Chapter 25, pp. 591–622. Bingley, UK: Emeralds Group Publishing Ltd.
- Bhatia, Tej K. (2011). "The multilingual mind, optimization theory and Hinglish". In Chutneyfying English: The phenomenon of Hinglish, Rita Kothari and Rupert Snell (eds.) pp. 37–52. New Delhi: Penguin Books India.
- Clyne, Michael (2000). "Constraints on code-switching: how universal are they?". In Li Wei. The Bilingualism Reader. Routledge.
- Gardner-Chloros, Penelope (2009). Code-switching. Cambridge: Cambridge University Press. Print.
- Gumperz, John J. (1982). Discourse Strategies. Cambridge: Cambridge University Press.
- Heller, Monica (1992). "The Politics of Codeswitching and Language Choice". In C. Eastman. Codeswitching. Clevedon: Multilingual Matters.
- James, Allan (2016). From code-mixing to mode-mixing in the European context. John Wiley & Sons: World Englishes. 259-275
- Kanngieser, Anja (2012). "A sonic geography of voice: Towards an affective politics". Progress in Human Geography. 36 (3): 336–353.
- Kohnert, K.; Yim, D.; Nett, K.; Duran, P. F.; Duran, L. (2005). "Intervention with linguistically diverse preschool children: A focus on developing home language(s)". Language, Speech and Hearing Services in Schools. 36 (3): 251–63
- Muysken, Pieter (1995). "Code-switching and grammatical theory". In L. Milroy; P. Muysken. One Speaker, Two Languages: Cross-disciplinary Perspectives on Code-switching. Cambridge: Cambridge University Press. pp. 177–98.
- Myers-Scotton, Carol (1989). "Codeswitching with English: types of switching, types of communities". World Englishes. 8 (3): 333–346
- Poplack, Shana (1980). Sometimes Ι start a sentence in Spanish y termino en español: toward a typology of code-switching. Linguistics (18): 581-618
- Poplack, Shana; David Sankoff (1984). "Borrowing: the synchrony of integration". Linguistics. 22 (269): 99–136
- Poplack, Shana & Meechan, Marjory (1998). Introduction: How Languages Fit Together in Codemixing. The International Journal of Bilingualism. Vol. 2 (2): 127-138
- Pujolar, Joan (2000). Gender, Heteroglossia and Power. A Sociolinguistic Study of Youth Culture. Berlin: Walter de Gruyter.
- Rampton, Ben (1995). Crossing: Language and Ethnicity among Adolescents. London: Longman.
- Weinreich, Uriel (1953). Languages in Contact. The Hague: Mouton.
- Woolard, Kathryn (2004). "Codeswitching". In A. Duranti. A Companion to Linguistic Anthropology. Malden, Mass.: Blackwell. pp. 73–94.

== Grammatical theories ==
- Altarriba, Jeanette & Basnight-Brown, Dana M. (2009). Empirical approaches to the study of code-switching in sentential contexts: 3-25
- Belazi, Heidi; Edward Rubin; Almeida Jacqueline Toribio (1994). "Code switching and X-Bar theory: The functional head constraint". Linguistic Inquiry. 25 (2): 221–37.
- Bhatia, Tej K. and William Ritchie. (2009). "Language Mixing, Universal Grammar and Second Language Acquisition". In: The New Handbook of Second Language Acquisition. William C. Ritchie and Tej K. Bhatia (eds.), Chapter 25, pp. 591–622. Bingley, UK: Emeralds Group Publishing Ltd.
- Bhatt, Rakesh M. (1995). "Code-switching and the functional head constraint". In Janet Fuller; et al. Proceedings of the Eleventh Eastern States Conference on Linguistics. Ithaca, NY: Department of Modern Languages and Linguistics. pp. 1–12.
- Bokamba, Eyamba G. (1989). "Are there syntactic constraints on code-mixing?". World Englishes. 8 (3): 277–92
- Cantone, K. F.; MacSwan, J. (2009). "The syntax of DP-internal codeswitching". In Isurin, L.; Winford, D.; de Bot, K. Multidisciplinary Approaches to Codeswitching. Amsterdam: John Benjamins. pp. 243–278.
- Joshi, Aravind (1985). "How much context-sensitivity is necessary for assigning structural descriptions: Tree adjoining grammars".
- Kootstra, Gerrit Jan; van Hell, Janet G. & Dijkstra, Ton (2010). Syntactic alignment and shared word order in code-switched sentence production: Evidence from bilingual monologue and dialogue. Journal of Memory and Language 63: 210–231
- MacSwan, Jeff (2013). "Code-switching and grammatical theory". In T. Bhatia and W. Ritchie. Handbook of Multilingualism (2nd ed.). Cambridge: Blackwell.
- Myers-Scotton, Carol (1993). Duelling languages: grammatical structure in codeswitching. Oxford, Eng.: Clarendon Press. Print.
- Pfaff, Carol W. (1979). Constraints on Language Mixing: Intrasentential Code-Switching and Borrowing in Spanish/ English. Language, Vol. 55 (2): 291-318
- Sankoff, David; Shana Poplack (1981). "A formal grammar for code-switching". Papers in Linguistics. 14 (1–4): 3–45.
- Sebba, Mark; Wooton, Tony (1998). "We, They and Identity: Sequential Versus Identity-Related Explanation in Code Switching". In P. Auer. Code-Switching in Conversation: Language, Interaction, and Identity. London: Routledge. pp. 262–86.
- Stammers, Jonathan R. & Deuchar, Margaret (2012). Testing the nonce borrowing hypothesis: Counter-evidence from English- origin verbs in Welsh. Bilingualism: Language and Cognition. Vol. 15 (3): 630 - 643
- Winford, Donald (2003). "Code Switching: Linguistic Aspects." An Introduction to Contact Linguistics. Malden, MA: Blackwell Pub. 126–167. Print.

== Social theories ==
- Barbarie, Yves (1982). Analyse sociolinguistique de la syntaxe de l’interrogation en français québécois. Revue québécoise de linguistique, vol. 12 (1): 145-167
- Blom, Jan-Petter; John J. Gumperz (1972). "Social meaning in linguistic structures: Code switching in northern Norway". In J. J. Gumperz; D. Hymes. Directions in Sociolinguistics. New York: Holt, Rinehart, and Winston.
- Gardner-Chloros, Penelope & Cheshire, Jenny (1998). Code-switching and the sociolinguistic gender pattern. International Journal of the Sociology of Language 129: 5-34
- Kroskrity, Paul V (2000). "Language ideologies in the expression and representation of Arizona Tewa identity". In P. V. Kroskrity. Regimes of Language: Ideologies, Polities, and Identities. Santa Fe, New Mexico: School of American Research Press. pp. 329–59.
- Myers-Scotton, Carol (1993). Social Motivations for Codeswitching: Evidence from Africa. Oxford: Clarendon.

=== Conversational code-switching ===
- Auer, Peter (1998). Code-Switching in Conversation. London: Routledge.
- Reyes, Iliana (2004). "Functions of code switching in schoolchildren's conversations". Bilingual Research Journal. 28 (1): 77–98.
- Cromdal, Jakob (2001). "Overlap in bilingual play: Some implications of code-switching for overlap resolution". Research on Language and Social Interaction, 34 (4): 421–451. doi:10.1207/S15327973RLSI3404_02
- Cromdal, Jakob (2004). "Building bilingual oppositions: Code-switching in children’s disputes". Language in Society, 33 (1): 33–58. doi:10.1017/S0047404504031021
- Musk, Nigel John (2010). "Code-switching and code-mixing in Welsh bilinguals' talk: Confirming or refuting the maintenance of language boundaries?" Language, Culture and Curriculum. 23 (3): 179–197.
- Musk, Nigel John (2012). "Performing bilingualism in Wales: Arguing the case for empirical and theoretical eclecticism". Pragmatics: Quarterly Publication of the International Pragmatics Association. 22 (4): 651–669.

=== Artistic and literary code-switching ===
- Aldama, Frederick Luis and Ilan Stavans. Poets, Philosophers, Lovers: On the Writings of Giannina Braschi. U Pittsburgh, 2020. pp. 5–15.
- Bentahila, Abdelâli and Davies Eirlys E. "Language mixing in rai music: Localisation or globalisation?" Language and communication 22 (2002): 187–207
- Casielles-Suárez, Eugenia. "Radical code-switching in The Brief Wondrous Life of Oscar Wao." Bulletin of Hispanic Studies 90.4 (2013): 475–488.
- Castillo, Debra A. Redreaming America: Toward a Bilingual American Culture. SUNY Press, 2005.
- Davies, Eirlys E. & Bentahila, Abdelâli (2008). Translation and Code Switching in the Lyrics of Bilingual Popular Songs, The Translator, 14:2, 247-272
- Demaizière Colette (1989). Les niveaux de langue dans le roman québécois : Michel Tremblay et Réjean Ducharme. In: Cahiers de l'Association internationale des études françaises, n°41. pp. 81–98.
- González, Christopher. Permissible Narratives: The Promise of Latino/a Literature. The Ohio State University Press, 2017.
- Guzmán, Gualberto A., et al. "Metrics for Modeling Code-Switching Across Corpora." INTERSPEECH. 2017.
- Ladouceur, Louise (2006). Write to speak: Accents et alternances de codes dans les textes dramatiques écrits et traduits au Canada. Target 18 (1): 49–68.
- Martin, Holly E. (2005) Code-switching in US ethnic literature: multiple perspectives presented through multiple languages, Changing English, 12:3, 403-415
- McClure, Erica (2001). "Oral and Written Assyrian-English Code-switching." In Rodolfo Jacobson. Codeswitching Worldwide II. Berlin, New York: Mouton de Gruyter, 2001. pg 166. Print.
- Moreno Fernández, Francisco, "Yo-Yo Boing! Or Literature as a Translingual Practice" Poets, Philosophers, Lovers: On the Writings of Giannina Braschi. University of Pittsburgh Press. pp. 54–62.
- Picone, Michael (2002). Artistic codemixing. University of Pennsylvania Working Papers in Linguistics. Vol. 8 (3): 191-207
- Sarkar, Mela (2008). "Ousqu'on chill à ce soir" pratiques multilingues dans rap montrealais. Diversité urbaine (1): 27–44.
- Sarkar, Mela & Winer, Lise (2006). Multilingual codeswitching in Quebec Rap: Poetry, Pragmatics and Performativity. International Journal of Multilingualism. Vol. 3 (3): 173-192
- Toribio, Almeida Jacqueline. "25 Code-switching among US Latinos." The Handbook of Hispanic Sociolinguistics (2011): 530.
- Torres, Lourdes. "In the contact zone: Code-switching strategies by Latino/a writers." Melus 32.1 (2007): 75–96.
- Wei, Li (1998). "The 'Why' and 'How' Questions in the Analysis of Conversational Codeswitching". In P. Auer. Code-Switching in Conversation: Language, Interaction, and Identity. London: Routledge. pp. 156–76

== Languages ==
- Berg Grimstad, Maren; Lohndal, Terje & Åfarli, Tor A. (2014). Language mixing and exoskeletal theory: A case study of word-internal mixing in American Norwegian. The Norwegian University of Science and Technology (NTNU), Nordlyd 41 (2): 213-237
- Bovet, Ludmila (1986). Le traitement des québécismes dans le Grand Robert 1985. Revue québécoise de linguistique, vol. 16 (1): 311–320.
- Cromdal, Jakob (2013). "Bilingual and second-language interactions: Views from Scandinavia". International Journal of Bilingualism, 17 (2): 121–131. doi:10.1177/1367006912441415
- Das, Sonia (2011). "Rewriting the past and reimagining the future: The social life of a Tamil heritage language industry". American Ethnologist. 38 (4): 774–789.
- Martel, Pierre & Vincent, Nadine & Cajolet-Laganière, Hélène (1998). Le français québécois et la légitimité de sa description. Revue québécoise de linguistique, vol. 26 (2): 95-106
- Torres, Lourdes (2007). "In the Contact Zone: Code-Switching Strategies by Latino/a Writers". Melus. 32 (1): 75–96
- Vézina, Robert (2002). La norme du français québécois: l’affirmation d’un libre arbitre normatif. In: 'Les pratiques terminologiques et lexicographiques', Conference proceedings of the 69th Acfas congress, held at the University of Sherbrooke on May 14 and 15, 2001. Eds. Bouchard, Pierre & de Monique C. Cormier. Montréal: Office de la langue française, Langues et sociétés (39): 37-47

=== AAVE-Standard English ===
- DeBose, Charles (1992). "Codeswitching: Black English and Standard English in the African-American linguistic repertoire". In Eastman, Carol. Codeswitching. Clevedon: Multilingual Matters. pp. 157–167

=== English-Spanish ===
- Anderson, Tyler Kimball & Toribio, Almeida Jacqueline (2007). Attitudes towards lexical borrowing and intra-sentential code-switching among Spanish-English bilinguals. Spanish in Context 4 (2): 217–240
- Balukas, Colleen & Koops, Christian (2014). Spanish-English bilingual voice onset time in spontaneous code-switching. International Journal of Bilingualism, Vol. XX(X) 1–21
- Poplack, Shana (1980). Sometimes Ι start a sentence in Spanish y termino en español: toward a typology of code-switching. Linguistics (18): 581-618
- Zentella, Ana Celia (1997). Growing Up Bilingual. Malden, MA: Blackwell.

=== Spanish-German ===
- González-Vilbazo, Kay & López, Luis (2010). Some properties of light verbs in code-switching. Elsevier. 833-850

=== Arabic-French ===
- Redouane, Rabia (2005). Linguistic Constraints on Codeswitching and Codemixing of Bilingual Moroccan Arabic-French Speakers in Canada. ISB4: Proceedings of the 4th International Symposium on Bilingualism, ed. James Cohen, Kara T. McAlister, Kellie Rolstad, and Jeff MacSwan. Somerville, MA: Cascadilla Press. 1921–1933.

== Bilingualism ==
- Auer, Peter (1984). Bilingual Conversation. Amsterdam: John Benjamins
- Brice, A.; Brice, R. (2009). Language development: Monolingual and bilingual acquisition. Old Tappan, NJ: Merrill/Prentice Hall.
- Björk-Willén, Polly & Cromdal, Jakob (2009). "When education seeps into play: How preschool children accomplish doing multilingual education in ‘free play’". Journal of Pragmatics, 41 (8): 1493-1518. doi.org/10.1016/j.pragma.2007.06.006
- Cromdal, Jakob (2001). "Overlap in Bilingual Play: Some Implications of Code-Switching for Overlap Resolution". Research on Language and Social Interaction. 34 (4): 421–51. doi:10.1207/S15327973RLSI3404_02
- Cromdal, Jakob (2003). "The creation and administration of social relations in bilingual group work". Journal of Multilingual and Multicultural Development, 24 (1-2): 56–75.
- Cromdal, Jakob (2004). "Building bilingual oppositions: Code-switching in children's disputes". Language in Society, 33, 33–58. doi:10.1017/S0047404504031021
- Cromdal, Jakob (2005). "Bilingual order in collaborative text processing: On creating an English text in Swedish". Journal of Pragmatics, 37 (3): 329–353. doi:10.1016/j.pragma.2004.10.006
- Fishman, Joshua (1967). "Bilingualism with and without diglossia; Diglossia with and without bilingualism". Journal of Social Issues. 23 (2): 29–38.
- Genesee, Fred (2000). "Early bilingual language development: one language or two?". In Li Wei. The Bilingualism Reader. Routledge.
- Grosjean, François & Miller, Joanne L. (1994). Going in and out of Languages: An Example of Bilingual Flexibility. Psychological Science, Vol. 5 (4): 201-206
- Gutierrez-Clellen, V. (1999). "Language choice in intervention with bilingual children". American Journal of Speech-Language Pathology. 8: 291–302.
- Huq, Rizwan-ul, Barajas Eriksson, Katarina & Cromdal, Jakob (2017). "Sparkling, Wrinkling, Softly Tinkling: On Poetry and Word Meaning in a Bilingual Primary Classroom". In Amanda Bateman & Amelia Church (Eds.), Children's knowledge-in-interaction. Studies in conversation analysis. Berlin: Springer. 189–209.
- Jiang, Yih-Lin Belinda; García, Georgia Earnest & Willis, Arlette Ingram (2014). Code-Mixing as a Bilingual Instructional Strategy. Bilingual Research Journal. 37 (3): 311-326
- MacSwan, Jeff (2000). "The architecture of the bilingual language faculty: Evidence from codeswitching". Bilingualism: Language and Cognition 3 (1): 37–54.
- McClure, Erica (1977). Aspects of code-switching in the discourse of bilingual Mexican-American children. In: Saville-Troike, Muriel (ed.). Linguistics and Anthropology. Georgetown University School of Languages and Linguistics: 93-115
- Muysken, Pieter (2016). From Colombo to Athens: Areal and Universalist Perspectives on Bilingual Compound Verbs. Languages 1 (2): 1-18
- Valenti, Eva (2014). Nous autres c’est toujours bilingue anyways: Code–Switching and Linguistic Displacement Among Bilingual Montréal Students. American Review of Canadian Studies, 44 (3): 279-292
- Wei, Li, ed. (2000). The Bilingualism Reader. London: Routledge.
- Woolford, Ellen (1983). "Bilingual Code-Switching and Syntactic Theory." Linguistic Inquiry. Vol. 14. Cambridge: MIT. 520–36. Print.
- Zentella, Ana Celia (1997). Growing Up Bilingual. Malden, MA: Blackwell.

== See also ==
- Code-switching
- Code-switching in Hong Kong
- Heteroglossia
- Metaphorical code-switching
- Mixed language
- Situational code-switching
- Style shifting
- Raciolinguistics
- Translanguaging
