= Markedness model =

Sociolinguistic model of code-switching

The markedness model (sociolinguistic theory) proposed by Carol Myers-Scotton is one account of the social indexical motivation for code-switching. The model holds that speakers use language choices to index rights and obligations (RO) sets, the abstract social codes in operation between participants in a given interaction.

== Theory ==
According to Myers-Scotton, for any communicative situation there exists an unmarked, expected RO set and a marked, differential one. In choosing a code the speaker evaluates the markedness of their potential choices, determined by the social forces at work in their community, and decides either to follow or reject the normative model. Making the marked choice is thus a conscious bid for a new RO set. Speakers employ code choices rationally, as a way of establishing their social position according to the "negotiation principle": "Choose the form of your conversational contribution such that it indexes the set of rights and obligations which you wish to be in force between the speaker and addressee for the current exchange". Marked choices are often accompanied by prosodic features such as pauses, or metacommentary on the switch. When the unmarked choice is not clear, speakers use code-switching in an exploratory way to establish the favored social balance. Myers-Scotton has proposed that the markedness model is applicable to all language choices, beyond the limits of code-switching.

The markedness model operates within Myers-Scotton's matrix language-frame theory, a production-based explanation for code-switching that posits constraints on switches at the level of the mental lexicon (as opposed to that of the surface structure). The theory holds that a code-switching speaker alternates between the matrix language (ML) and an embedded language (EL). The ML is the more active and more frequently-used language, which restricts the use of the EL. It is common, though not necessary, for the ML to correspond with the unmarked choice in a typical interaction.

=== Example ===
Myers-Scotton gives the following example to illustrate the markedness model, involving a clerk and customer at a bank in Nairobi for whom the unmarked code choice is Swahili. The customer begins speaking in the unmarked Swahili and later switches to Luo, their shared ethnic language, to index social solidarity with the clerk, trying to solicit extra help.

Clerk (Swahili): Ee-sema. 'OK-what do you want?' (lit.: 'speak')

Customer: Nipe fomu ya kuchukua pesa. 'Give me the form for withdrawing money.'

Clerk: Nipe kitabu kwanza. 'Give me [your] book first.' (Customer gives him the passbook.)

Customer: Hebu, chukua fomu yangu. 'Say, how about taking my form.'

Clerk: Bwana, huwezi kutoa pesa leo kwa sababu hujamaliza siku saba. 'Mister, you can't take out money today because you haven't yet finished seven days (since the last withdrawal).'

Customer (switching to Luo): Konya An Marach. 'Help, I'm in trouble.'

Clerk (also switching to Luo): Anyalo Kony, Kik Inuo Kendo. 'I can help you, but don't repeat it.'

=== Criticisms ===
Analyst Peter Auer has critiqued the markedness model for not adequately describing speakers' perceptions of their own behavior. He contends that in switching codes speakers do not make reference to any pre-existing normative model but rather actively create and produce social meaning according to the particularities of the interaction.

Blommaert and Meeuwis, drawing on a study of Zairians in Belgium, have further proposed that the markedness model is limited in its failure to account for variability within languages (codes), describing only shifts from one language to another. They criticize the model for assuming monolingualism to be the normative point of reference in communication.

Kathryn Woolard has challenged Myers-Scotton's assumption that code-switching is strategic, and suggests that switching is not always a deliberate, or even conscious choice. Her research has shown that speakers are not always aware of their code-switching in communicative interaction.

== See also ==
- Bibliography of code-switching
- Diglossia
- Indexicality
- Language contact
