= Metaphorical code-switching =

Metaphorical code-switching refers to the tendency in a bilingual or multilingual community to switch codes (language or language variety) in conversation in order to discuss a topic that would normally fall into another conversational domain. "An important distinction is made from situational switching, where alternation between varieties redefines a situation, being a change in governing norms, and metaphorical switching, where alternation enriches a situation, allowing for allusion to more than one social relationship within the situation." For example, at a family dinner, where you would expect to hear a more colloquial, less prestigious variety of language (called "L variety" in studies of diglossia), family members might switch to a highly prestigious form (H variety) in order to discuss school or work. At work (where you would expect high prestige language) interlocutors may switch to a low prestige variety when discussing family.

== Development ==
Jan-Petter Blom and John J. Gumperz coined the linguistic term 'metaphorical code-switching' in the late sixties and early seventies. They wanted to "clarify the social and linguistic factors involved in the communication process ... by showing that speaker's selection among semantically, grammatically, and phonologically permissible alternates occurring in conversation sequences recorded in natural groups is both patterned and predictable on the basis of certain features of the local social system." They wanted to explain why, in a community where all the members of a community have access to two codes, a speaker will sometimes prefer one over another. They therefore did a study in Hemnesberget, a diglossic community in Norway, to test their hypothesis that switching was topic related and predictable.

== Hemnesberget ==
In Hemnesberget, most residents are native speakers of Ranamål, a dialect of northern Norway. Contrastively, formal education is always carried out in the standard, Bokmål. Residents of Hemnesberget see their dialect as part of their social identity. Gumperz and Blom showed the use of metaphorical code switching by Norwegian University students who were native to Hemnesberget and thus native speakers of Ranamål. The study was conducted in an informal setting in the home of one of the informants where refreshments were served and people spoke casually. Some elicitation strategies were used to make sure a wide variety of topics were covered. As they hypothesized, the students spoke in their dialect the low variety when talking about casual topics such as drinking habits and switched to the high variety when talking about more academic topics such as industrial development and university regulations. One of the most interesting findings was that these switches were subconscious to the speakers. When informants listened to the recordings of their conversations, they not only were appalled that their speech had diverged from their dialect, but they also "promised to refrain from switching during future discussion sessions."

== Examples ==
An example of metaphorical code-switching comes from conversation recorded by Susan Gal in Oberwaert, an Austrian town that is home to many ethnic Hungarians. According to Gal's study the German language had high prestige in Oberwaert, while Hungarian had low prestige. In this exchange a grandfather is calling his two grandchildren to come and help him. (Hungarian is shown in ordinary type with German in italics.)

Grandfather: Szo! Ide dzsiini! jeszt jeramunyi

(Well, come here! out all this way)

mind e kettuotok, no hat akkor!

(both of you, well now)

kum her! (pause) Nem koapsz vacsorat

(Come here! You don't get supper.)

The grandfather first calls his grandchildren in Hungarian. But when they do not answer him, he switches to German. Since the German language is associated with more formal settings, it gives the grandfather's words more force.

Another example comes from testimony to South Africa's Truth and Reconciliation Commission by Muhammad Ferhelst, a man who was imprisoned and tortured during apartheid. Ferhelst speaks English but switches to Afrikaans when he quotes a white policeman.

At about seven or eight Van Brakel came, he started asking me questions, smacking me around what and then he left again and he said ons maak jou nog vrek, voor jy uit die tronk uit kom they told me they would kill me.

(We'll make you die yet, before you get out of prison.)

Most of Mr. Ferhelst's testimony was in English, even when quoting white policemen. The use of impolite Afrikaans words in this case characterizes the policeman as rude and uncivilized. The switch from English to Afrikaans emphasizes the trauma of the experience.

== Domain specificity ==
Domain specificity refers to the pattern in bilingual or multilingual speech communities in which speakers use one language or code in formal settings and conversations (high variety) and another for informal ones (low variety). The general social situations and behavioral co-occurrences in which speakers prefer one code over another are termed domains. Domain specificity has been expanded to include the idea of metaphorical code-switching.

Charles A. Ferguson's 1959 work on diglossia served as a foundation for Joshua Fishman's later work on domain specificity. According to Ferguson, diglossia describes a situation where two or more distinct (related or unrelated) languages are spoken in a single speech community, and where the languages "are used side by side within a community each with a clearly defined role."

Following Ferguson's work on Diglossia, Fishman developed his theory of domain specificity. Diglossia refers to the expected use of language on a broad social level (or macro-level) and domain specificity refers to the use of language in a face-to-face conversation (micro-level).

Fishman stated that domains were "defined, regardless of their number, in terms of institutional contexts and their congruent behavioural co-occurrences." He said "'proper' usage dictates that only one of the theoretically co-available languages or varieties will be chosen by particular classes of interlocutors on particular kinds of occasions to discuss particular topics."

Though they did not define specific universal domains, Fishman and Greenfield observed five in a study that they published in 1970 on Puerto Rican communities in New York. They observed the community then specified apparent domains. The domains included: family, friendship, work, religion and education. They subsequently asked the community to report on their language use in these domains. The results largely fit with the patterns they expected to find where members of the community largely preferred Spanish with friends and family and English at work and in school.

== See also ==
- Code mixing
- Communication Accommodation Theory
- Heteroglossia
- Indexicality
- Language contact
- Macaronic language
- Markedness Model
- Mixed language
- Style shifting
