= Code-switching =

Changing between languages during a conversation

Sarah Geronimo and an interviewer code-switch between English and Filipino. Such code-switching is widespread in the Philippines.

Maya Diab code-switches between English and Lebanese Arabic mid-sentence.

In linguistics, code-switching or language alternation is the process of shifting from one linguistic code (a language or dialect) to another, depending on the social context or conversational setting. These alternations are generally intended to influence the relationship between the speakers, for example, suggesting that they may share identities based on similar linguistic histories.

Code-switching is different from plurilingualism in that plurilingualism refers to the ability of an individual to use multiple languages, while code-switching is the act of using multiple languages together. Multilinguals (speakers of more than one language) sometimes use elements of multiple languages when conversing with each other. Thus, code-switching is the use of more than one linguistic variety in a manner consistent with the syntax and phonology of each variety.

Code-switching may happen between sentences, sentence fragments, words, or individual morphemes (in synthetic languages). However, some linguists consider the borrowing of words or morphemes from another language to be different from other types of code-switching.

Code-switching can occur when there is a change in the environment in which one is speaking, or in the context of speaking a different language or switching the verbiage to match that of the audience. There are many ways in which code-switching is employed, such as when speakers are unable to express themselves adequately in a single language or to signal an attitude towards something. Several theories have been developed to explain the reasoning behind code-switching from sociological and linguistic perspectives.

== Use ==
The earliest known use of the term "code-switching" was published in 1951 by Lucy Shepard Freeland in Languages of the Sierra Miwok, and more widely recognized by Roman Jakobson in Results of the Conference of Anthropologists and Linguists in 1953. Written with C. F. Voegelin, T. A. Sebeok, and C. Lévi-Strauss, Jakobson attributes the idea to linguist William Freeman Twaddell, inspired by "communication engineers".

In the 1950s, many scholars considered code-switching to be a substandard use of language. Since the 1980s, however, most scholars have come to regard it as a normal, natural product of bilingual and multilingual language use.

In popular usage and in sociolinguistic study, the term code-switching is frequently used to refer to switching among dialects, styles or registers. This form of switching is practiced, for example, by speakers of African American Vernacular English as they move from less formal to more formal settings. Such shifts, when performed by public figures such as politicians, are sometimes criticized as signaling inauthenticity or insincerity.

The term "code-switching" is also used outside the field of linguistics. Informally, code-switching is sometimes used to refer to relatively stable informal mixtures of two languages, such as Spanglish, Taglish, or Hinglish. Some scholars of literature use the term to describe literary styles that include elements from more than one language, as in novels by Chinese-American, Anglo-Indian, or Latino writers.

As switching between languages is exceedingly common and takes many forms, code-switching can also be recognized as sentence alternation. A sentence may begin in one language, and finish in another. Or phrases from both languages may succeed each other in apparently random order. Such behavior can be explained only by postulating a range of linguistic or social factors such as the following:

- Speakers cannot express themselves adequately in one language, so they switch to another to work around the deficiency. This may trigger a speaker to continue in the other language for a while.
- Switching to a minority language is very common as a means of expressing solidarity with a social group. The language change signals to the listener that the speaker is from a certain background; if the listener responds with a similar switch, a degree of rapport is established.
- The switch between languages can signal the speaker's attitude towards the listener - friendly, irritated, distant, ironic, jocular and so on. Monolinguals can communicate these effects to some extent by varying the level of formality of their speech; bilinguals can do it by language switching.

Code-switching involves the capacity of bilingual individuals to switch between different languages within a single conversation. John Gutiérrez notes that code-switching is most commonly observed among bilingual individuals who are highly skilled in both languages and is actually prevalent in numerous bilingual communities, contrary to common beliefs. The patterns of language switching exhibited by the speaker can be influenced by the listener's level of proficiency in the languages or their personal language preferences.

== Distinguishing features ==
Code-switching is distinct from other language contact phenomena, such as borrowing, pidgins and creoles, and loan translation (calques), and translanguaging. Borrowing affects the lexicon, the words that make up a language, while code-switching takes place in individual utterances. Speakers form and establish a pidgin language when two or more speakers who do not speak a common language form an intermediate, third language. Translanguaging refers to multilingual speakers' abilities to draw from multiple languages in a fluid way, rather than the distinction of multiple languages in codeswitching. Speakers also practice code-switching when they are each fluent in both languages. The process of code-switching focuses on the grammatical system within the analyzing and interpretation of languages. Individuals have a blended grammatical system that allows them to apply one, combined set of language rules. Code-mixing is a thematically related term, but the usage of the terms code-switching and code-mixing varies. Some scholars use either term to denote the same practice, while others apply code-mixing to denote the formal linguistic properties of language-contact phenomena and code-switching to denote the actual, spoken usages by multilingual persons.

=== Code-switching and language transfer ===
There is much debate in the field of linguistics regarding the distinction between code-switching and language transfer. According to Jeanine Treffers-Daller, "considering CS [code-switching] and [language] transfer as similar phenomena is helpful if one wants to create a theory that is as parsimonious as possible, and therefore it is worth attempting to aim for such a unified approach, unless there is compelling evidence that this is not possible."

Not all linguists agree on whether they should be considered similar phenomena. In some cases, linguists refer to the benefits and disadvantages of language transfer as two separate phenomena, i.e., language transference and language interference, respectively. In such views, these two kinds of language transfer, along with code-switching, comprise what is known as cross-linguistic influence.

Part of the debate may be solved by simply clarifying some key definitions. Evidently, linguists sometimes use different terminology to refer to the same phenomenon, which can make it confusing to distinguish between two phenomena from one another in investigative discourse. For instance, psycholinguists frequently make use of the term language switching in reference to the "controlled and willed switching" to another language. However, this term is hardly used by linguists working on natural code-switching.

Nevertheless, adopting the notion that code-switching involves switching between languages by a multilingual speaker fluent in the languages being alternated can alleviate the contention behind this debate. This is so because language transfer does not require such a switch between language systems to be performed by a multilingual speaker fluent in the alternated languages. As a result, this can account for transfer errors, when proficiency in one language is lower than the proficiency of the speaker in the other.

On the other hand, there are linguists that maintain "that CS and transfer are manifestations of the same phenomenon, i.e. the influence of one language on another, is an attractive null hypothesis that can be tested in experimental settings."

== Easily confused terms ==
Some terms are commonly confused with usage when discussing code-switching. Sometimes they are used interchangeably as there is not a fixed and definitive definition of code-switching in the field. Below are some commonly considered definitions by scholars in the field of these terms easily confused with code-switching, highlighting the differences between them and code-switching.

Code-meshing is considered to be the combination or variation of one language with other linguistic aspects of the same language, like linguistic traditions, or simply with other languages. Whereas code-switching can indicate one language having higher recognition over another in certain settings, resulting in the latter being transmitted into the former or even being switched out for the former, code-meshing may indicate the achievement of a relative linguistic equality. The resulting product of code-meshing turns out to be more of an integration or system of language, instead of having the different components of the product separated or segregated. Therefore, it even avoids some issues regarding racism and promotes rhetoric effectiveness compared to code-switching.

Translingual or translanguaging may have come in the form of a combination of language usage with nonlinguistic elements. For example, people can use multiple different languages plus drawing symbol or small images to express one message or idea by putting them together on a surface. When compared to code-switching, it has a more common or fixed purpose of making sense or conveying meanings. Some scholars use the term translingualism to broadly describe the behavior of combining different languages together without prescriptive definition and articulation. Specifically, they consider translingualism to be highly the usage of multiple language in writing and divide it into translingual work, translingual negotiation and translingual rhetoric for discussion and research study purpose.

== Rationale ==
A single conversation may afford several reasons to switch codes:

- A particular topic: People generally switch codes during discourse about a particular topic when a specific language is necessary or preferred; alternative speech may better convey relevant concepts. For example, some Afrobarometer surveys were conducted in the language used in school because certain concepts only exist in that language, and switched to a tribal or community language they grew up with for everyday concepts.
- Quoting someone: People will switch codes while quoting another person.
- Solidarity and gratitude: When expressing gratitude or solidarity, code-switching can occur inadvertently or with the intention of fostering a rapport.
- Clarification: A speaker may engage in code-switching when listeners have difficulty comprehending specific words or concepts initially by simplifying their vocabulary or syntax and increasing volume to strengthen comprehension.
- Group identity: People may alter their language to express group identification. This can happen, for example, when introducing members of a particular group to others.
- To soften or strengthen command: While asking someone to do something, code-switching works to mark emphasis or provide inspiration.
- Lexical need: Code-switching occurs when people use technical or idiomatic speech from a foreign or non-primary language in order to translate ideas in their native language. Alternating between their native language and English allows individuals to assist with gaps in their understanding or to aid in the comprehension of others.
- Unconscious effort: People may engage in code-switching without thinking about it. This can occur when one is frightened by a specific event or circumstances such as going on a thrilling ride at an amusement park.
- To fit in: Code-switching is a useful tool for people to talk and act more like those around them.
- To get something: People code-switching to a dialect, language, or accent of the local people in the area may get better deals, prices, or treatments when purchasing an item or service.
- To say something in secret: Code-switching can be used when a person wants to relay a message to another person with the intention that no one else around them can understand if they converse in another language.

== Types ==
Scholars use different names for various types of code-switching.

- Intersentential switching occurs outside the sentence or the clause level (i.e. at sentence or clause boundaries). It is sometimes called "extrasentential" switching. In Assyrian-English switching one could say, "Ani wideili. What happened?" ("Those, I did them. What happened?").
- Intra-sentential switching occurs within a sentence or a clause. In Spanish-English switching one could say, "La onda is to fight y jambar." ("The latest fad is to fight and steal.")
- Tag-switching is the switching of either a tag phrase or a word, or both, from one language to another, (common in intra-sentential switches). In Spanish-English switching one could say, "Él es de México y así los criaron a ellos, you know." ("He's from Mexico, and they raise them like that, you know.")
- Intra-word switching occurs within a word itself, such as at a morpheme boundary. In Shona-English switching one could say, "But ma-day-s a-no a-ya ha-ndi-si ku-mu-on-a. ("But these days I don't see him much.") Here the English plural morpheme -s appears alongside the Shona prefix ma-, which also marks plurality.

Most code-switching studies primarily focus on intra-sentential switching because it creates hybrid grammatical structures that require explanation. By contrast, the other types typically involve utterances that follow the grammar of a single language. Within intra-sentential switching, two major patterns are commonly distinguished: alternational and insertional. In alternational code-switching, a new mixed grammar emerges that combines elements of the two languages involved. In insertional code-switching, by contrast, elements from one language are inserted into the morphosyntactic frame of the other. Corroborating this typology, recent empirical work on social-media conversations reports that insertional code-mixing predominates, followed by congruent lexicalization and alternation.

A portmanteau sentence is a particular type of intrasentential code-switching. It is a hybrid involving structures from two different languages in one sentence in which an item in one language is used as a bridge between portions of the sentence in languages which have differing word order typologies. It is more of a "syntactic blend" than the kind of lexical blend one sees in portmanteau words such as smog.

Almedia Jacqueleline Toribio's study aims to answer a fundamental question: How do second language learners acquire the necessary knowledge to maintain structural coherence and make well-formedness judgments when using code-switched forms? The study reveals that there are two main beneficial aspects of code-switching. Both developmental patterns contribute to assessing methodological linguistic constructs. Toribio offers an illustration of intrasentential code-switching, showcasing consistent grammatical patterns. Proficient bilingual individuals, equipped with advanced proficiency in both languages, engage in intra-sentential code alternations.

=== Intrasentential vs. insertional ===
Intrasentential code-switching should be distinguished from the related linguistic phenomenon of insertional code-switching. Toribio defines intrasentential code-switching as the practice of switching between two languages within a single sentence structure while adhering to grammatical rules. Skilled bilingual individuals, who are competent in both languages, can judge whether the acceptability of such code-switching is grammatically and functionally correct.

Insertional code-switching is often referred to as borrowing or tag-switching. Toribio refers to insertional code-switching when lexical items from a secondary language are introduced into the primary language. These loan words are partially or fully assimilated into the secondary language, conforming to its phonological and morphological structure. Insertional code-switching serves a "pragmatic purpose, acting as sentence enhancers or indicating the speaker's attitude towards the context of an utterance."

Examples of intrasentential code-switching:

As spoken

Llegamos a los Estados Unidos en los 60s. We came to New York in the 60s.

Code-switching among bilinguals ha sido la fuente de numerosas investigaciones.

Translation:
In English

We arrived in the United States in the 60s. We came to New York in the 60s.

Code-switching among bilinguals has been the source of numerous studies.

Toribio also provides an instance of insertional code-switching, which demonstrates the incorporation of specific lexical elements into a target language. The borrowed words can be integrated into the host language either partially or entirely, taking into account their phonological and morphological structure.

Examples of insertional code-switching:

As spoken

El estudiante leyó el libro en el reference room.

I met up with my compadres at the fiesta.

Translation:
In English

The student read the book in the reference room.

I met up with my buddies at the party.

== Code-switching in language education ==
In most language education programs, such as English-as-a-second-language (ESL) programs, educators and learners have significant proficiency differences in their target language (the language which those learners are learning). Therefore, under such condition, code-switching is often a very common method to establish communication between educators and learners.

=== Applications in language learning process ===
The application of code-switching under such a condition can be divided into two main different situations: one is the interaction between learners and the educator, and the other is the communication between students and classmates. Linguists and educators have different opinions and views toward the use of code-switching under different situations in language teaching, so the two situations will be discussed separately. Assuming that both learners and language teachers have the same native language background, which means that everyone can use their same native language to build normal communication. In addition, the situation of foreign teachers (whose native language is the target language), and students from diverse backgrounds (each student has a different native language) are not included.

According to Grace Cornell Gonzales and Emily Machado, many teachers adapt their teaching styles to code-switching because they believe that it allows students to feel as if they are maintaining their full identity. Some educators allow students to code-switch when talking or writing. This strategy has been seen to be effective because it allows students to communicate their experiences just how they felt them happen. In some cases, some teachers will participate in code-switching when interacting with students because it allows students to feel more comfortable. According to Barbara Mellix, code-switching also allows students to feel more confident and secure with their languages and writing because they see that code-switching is acceptable in certain instances. Although code-switching can become difficult to control, it has been said that speaking and writing go hand in hand: if a person can write, then they can speak and control their switch in the same or similar way. According to Ena Lee and Steve Marshall, the process of code-switching in a classroom also allows for a "greater access" to knowledge. Code-switching occurs more often with those whose dominant language is not standard English.

Code switching involves utilizing entire sentences, phrases, and borrowed vocabulary from a different language. It is a prevalent linguistic occurrence observed among individuals who are bilingual. To proficiently engage in code switching, students need to possess a substantial comprehension of both cultures, along with a profound understanding of the fundamental structures and functions of language systems. Contrary to the conventional notion of code switching representing a disadvantaged and partially literate upbringing, it actually signifies an intellectual advantage.

Nevertheless, code switching has typically not been regarded as a favorable attribute by educational institutions, teachers, or the dominant culture. The methods employed for assessing and identifying giftedness have traditionally focused on a single language or relied on criteria and behaviors that align with the values and norms of the majority culture.

Historically, there has been a prevalent tendency to discourage code switching in both the educational system and society as a whole. Jean Aitchison's notes that discouragement stems from concerns regarding the potential negative impact on the languages involved, which could potentially lead to language erosion or decline. According to Aitchison, one possible explanation for the widespread disapproval of language variations is rooted in social-class prejudice. There exists a general belief that someone should arbitrate between the different forms of English. Aitchison concludes that the puristic stance toward language, which maintains the idea of an absolute standard of correctness, has its roots in a natural inclination towards nostalgia, further amplified by social pressures.

On the other hand, Adalberot Aguirre Jr. argues that language alternation, commonly known as code-switching, can serve as a valuable teaching and learning strategy in the bilingual classroom. A bilingual teacher possesses an intuitive understanding of bilingual behavior, which can play a crucial role in constructing a sociolinguistic profile of the student in such a classroom. This understanding enables the teacher to determine three key aspects: 1) the nature of the code-switching and how it occurs; 2) whether a student is mixing or alternating languages in a manner that indicates confusion; and 3) criteria for discerning between code-switching that carries meaning and code-switching that lacks significance.

Aguirre asserts that a bilingual teacher's intuitive knowledge of bilingual behavior can be instrumental in his or her construction of a sociolinguistic profile for the student in the bilingual classroom. He supports his argument by outlining three ways in which a teacher's intuitive knowledge can benefit bilingual children in the classroom. Firstly, if a teacher's intuitive knowledge suggests that a child possesses similar linguistic abilities in both languages, they may choose to alternate languages during instruction. This approach aims to enhance sentence complexity and expand the student's vocabulary, thereby strengthening their intuitive knowledge base for bilingual behavior. Secondly, a bilingual teacher's intuition may alert them to instances where a bilingual student is mixing languages in a way that indicates confusion rather than intentional code switching. Lastly, teachers can utilize their intuitive understanding of code switching to establish criteria for distinguishing meaningful code switching from meaningless instances.

=== Code-switching among learners ===
In these language education programs, the most common situation is that the learners do not have proficient language skills in the targeting language. For some examples, the vocabulary mastery of the learners is not enough to build the desired conversation or the learners lack of the abilities to construct sentence in the targeting language structure. In this case, it is impractical to build a complete conversation in the target language. In order to establish a clearer conversation in target language, learners often inevitably use code-switching so that they use their mother tongue to fill the gap caused by the lack of proficiency in the target language. Code-switching's occurrence in this case can reflected in a phenomenon known as "Cited Language". This phenomenon simply means that code-switching is used as a tool to fill in the lexical gaps that arise when establishing conversation in the target language. A simple example for this is to ask how to say a certain thing or a certain word in the target language. In addition, students in these language learning programs could actively avoid using Code-switching, either because of their own desire to establish a pure conversation in targeting language or because of the demands of their instructor. This is reflected in the fact that learners in these language programs often use code-switching briefly in a low-voice manner to help form a complete dialogue. Although the presence of code-switching in language learning programs is common, there are some educators who believe that the use of code-switching can cause dependency. For example, with frequent use of code-switching, students do not quickly adapt to speaking purely in the target language. Moreover, in language programs where the native language is quite different from the target language, the use of code-switching can lead to confusion about grammar and other sentence structures.

=== Code-switching for educators ===
In contrast with learners, educators usually have a higher level of proficiency in the target language which means they can use the target language for normal communication without barriers. Educators can converse fluently in both languages, so they have a choice as to whether and how often code-switching is used in the language teaching process. From the perspective of learning, in most cases, these frequencies are often inversely correlated with the learners' proficiency in the target language, that is, the higher the proficiency of the learners, the rarer the occurrence of code-switching.

From another perspective, compared to enhancing knowledge construction, some of these moves are done unintentionally because speaking in native languages simply helps reducing the complexity of communication, which simplified communication is also easier for students to understand what their teacher is trying to convey. A code-switched expression can be useful rather than in academic conversation that student actually learning languages through figuring out complicated sentences. These situations might cover maintaining class order, understanding students' mental health state, or making clarifications. Although instructors have the ability to choose whether or not to use code-switching, the question of when and how often to use it remains controversial. It is undeniable that code-switching is a powerful tool for making clarifications in many cases, especially when the scholar is extremely unfamiliar with the target language. But on the other hand, the use of code-switching by teachers can also lead to students not being able to adapt to new language situations.

== Code-switching in the classroom ==
Code-switching in classrooms is the practice of alternating between two or more languages or dialects in an educational setting. While sometimes confused with lexical borrowing, code-switching involves a more fluid transition between languages. Its role in the classroom is heavily debated among educators, more specifically, whether or not to incorporate it into school teachings. Code-switching has mainly been argued to shape student identity, learning outcomes, and classroom power dynamics.

=== Impact on student identity ===
Adapting to different languages and cultural norms can be a difficult process. Students tend to assimilate into the new culture to fit in with their peers, a behavior that lines up with the communication accommodation theory. Critics argue that formal or informal expectations to code-switch can intensify this pressure by encouraging students to conform to a dominant language norm. This dynamic has been described as contributing to feelings of cultural disconnect and isolation, as well as the perception that a student's native language is less valued.

As an alternative, code-meshing has been proposed as a method of teaching, where all languages are valued equally. Instead of strictly separating languages, this approach encourages students to incorporate their primary language into their school work. This allows students to utilize their cultural background, bringing diverse perspectives into a classroom.

Other scholars take a different view, suggesting that code-switching can help non-native speakers feel recognized in the classroom. As language practices are an of a student's bicultural life. From this perspective, code-switching is seen as a way to acknowledge students' linguistic and cultural identities rather than treating them as obstacles. Instead of being a mistake or lack of skill, code switching is a way of using language to show that a student has an idea and understands how the two languages work. Others argue that ethnic identity is connected to linguistic identity which creates pride and self acceptance for bilingual students.

==== Learning outcomes ====
Adapting to a new language and its norms can change how students process information and engage with course material. Some linguists point out that schools and universities often overestimate how proficient students are in the main language of instruction. When the classroom's primary language is a student's secondary language, they may work through content more slowly. This can unfortunately lead teachers to label them as "inadequate" or "behind" even when the issue is primarily linguistic, not cognitive.

However, in foreign language classrooms, student-led code-switching can actually help learners understand. Some teachers consider code-switching as a useful because it allows students to guess what words in another language mean using the context of their native language. To ensure students understand content in different languages, some teachers use translanguaging practices. This allows teachers to shift between language, giving students better academic content while proving their linguistic skills. A major challenge with this approach is that teachers have to ensure students truly understand the content across different languages, which creates distinct challenges in multilingual classrooms. Students often use "interliteracy," where they temporarily apply the grammar, spelling, or punctuation rules of one language to their writing in another as a way to support their development.

Students who are able to use code-switching in their writing demonstrate statistically significant improvements in specific higher order skills, notably "idea development" and "explicitness." Students, especially children, use their full repertoire of languages, opposing earlier theory about code-switching. It was thought that when an individual is code-switching, it is a transition between two separate monolingual identities. This idea is also known as translanguaging in writing.

=== Classroom power dynamics ===
The expectations around language use in schools often highlight underlying power dynamics. While code-switching usually refers to the blending of languages, "code-switching pedagogy" often refers to the expectation that students must switch out their native dialects and use Standard English for academic work. Some critics argue that mandatory code-switching is a harmful, or even racist, pedagogy that upholds standard English as the most "powerful". This is because it prevents students from thinking or speaking in ways that come easiest to them and frames other dialects as inappropriate for school.

For many bilinguals, code-switching is not a lack of 'rigor, correctness or appropriateness' but instead a natural way of speaking that is used to communicate and express themselves of who they are. Students use these languages practices in creative, skillful, and intelligent ways to express themselves in social interaction. As a response, some educators encourage students to question these linguistic hierarchies rather than just submitting to them. In practice, teachers might actively mix languages during lecture to clarify concepts and validate students' home languages, or allow students to draft assignments in their native dialect before translating them.

== Code-switching in remote settings ==
Code-switching in remote settings has become higher on the writing agenda due to the COVID-19 pandemic. Code-switching requires individuals to pull from various different language skill sets in order to contribute and engage in social situations that range from in person interactions to remote settings. Remote settings have taken the likes of social media, emails, and any other setting where communication has been made via online platforms. A study done by Cambridge University looked into how code-switching is present on remote, online platforms. Looking at tweets from Twitter regarding Hurricane Irma, researchers looked to see how posting went hand in hand with the impacted English and Spanish speaking countries. They found that many utilized English due to the platform's systemic influences. However, translations were prevalent in tweets to make them accessible to both English and Spanish speakers. To understand the relationship between how often people code-switched, the researchers calculated the proportion of code-switches of prior and current Tweets. The results of the study found that language switching produces Tweets that are better at conveying messages the individual wished to put across. Likewise, they found that multilingual individuals differed their code switches based on the language used in their previous Tweets. Due to the difficulty to use multiple languages in the same sentence in writing, more messages were English than in Spanish. Finally, when comparing non-code switching Tweets by the same writer, those with code-switching present had more complex language. This study is only one of potentially many studies to be done. Writing studies has much more to dissect about remote code-switching. Potential research could look into Zoom etiquette, Discord forums, etc.

== Theories ==
=== Social theories ===
Code-switching relates to, and sometimes indexes social-group membership in bilingual and multilingual communities. Some sociolinguists describe the relationships between code-switching behaviours and class, ethnicity, and other social positions. In addition, scholars in interactional linguistics and conversation analysis have studied code-switching as a means of structuring speech in interaction. Some discourse analysts, including conversation analyst Peter Auer, suggest that code-switching does not simply reflect social situations, but that it is a means to create social situations.

==== Markedness model ====
The Markedness model, developed by Carol Myers-Scotton, is one of the more complete theories of code-switching motivations. It posits that language users are rational and choose to speak a language that clearly marks their rights and obligations, relative to other speakers, in the conversation and its setting. When there is no clear, unmarked language choice, speakers practice code-switching to explore possible language choices. Many sociolinguists, however, object to the Markedness Model's postulation that language-choice is entirely rational.

==== Sequential analysis ====
Scholars of conversation analysis such as Peter Auer and Li Wei argue that the social motivation behind code-switching lies in the way code-switching is structured and managed in conversational interaction; in other words, the question of why code-switching occurs cannot be answered without first addressing the question of how it occurs. Using conversation analysis (CA), these scholars focus their attention on the sequential implications of code-switching. That is, whatever language a speaker chooses to use for a conversational turn, or part of a turn, impacts the subsequent choices of language by the speaker as well as the hearer. Rather than focusing on the social values inherent in the languages the speaker chooses ("brought-along meaning"), the analysis concentrates on the meaning that the act of code-switching itself creates ("brought-about meaning").

==== Communication accommodation theory ====
The communication accommodation theory (CAT), developed by Howard Giles, professor of communication at the University of California, Santa Barbara, seeks to explain the cognitive reasons for code-switching, and other changes in speech, as a person either emphasizes or minimizes the social differences between himself and the other person(s) in conversation. Giles posits that when speakers seek approval in a social situation they are likely to converge their speech with that of the other speaker. This can include, but is not limited to, the language of choice, accent, dialect, and para-linguistic features used in the conversation. In contrast to convergence, speakers might also engage in divergent speech, in which an individual person emphasizes the social distance between himself and other speakers by using speech with linguistic features characteristic of his own group.

==== Diglossia ====
In a diglossic situation, some topics are better suited to the use of one language over another. Joshua Fishman proposes a domain-specific code-switching model (later refined by Blom and Gumperz) wherein bilingual speakers choose which code to speak depending on where they are and what they are discussing. For example, a child who is a bilingual Spanish-English speaker might speak Spanish at home and English in class, but Spanish at recess.

=== Linguistic theories ===
In studying the syntactic and morphological patterns of language alternation, linguists have postulated specific grammatical rules and specific syntactic boundaries for where code-switching might occur.

==== Constraint-based model: Poplack (1980) ====
Shana Poplack's model of code-switching is an influential theory of the grammar of code-switching. In this model, code-switching is subject to two constraints. The free-morpheme constraint stipulates that code-switching cannot occur between a lexical stem and bound morphemes. Essentially, this constraint distinguishes code-switching from borrowing. Generally, borrowing occurs in the lexicon, while code-switching occurs at either the syntax level or the utterance-construction level. The equivalence constraint predicts that switches occur only at points where the surface structures of the languages coincide, or between sentence elements that are normally ordered in the same way by each individual grammar. For example, the sentence: "I like you porque eres simpático" ("I like you because you are friendly") is allowed because it obeys the syntactic rules of both Spanish and English. On the contrary, cases like the noun phrases the casa white and the blanca house are ruled out because the combinations are ungrammatical in at least one of the languages involved. Spanish noun phrases are made up of determiners, then nouns, then adjectives, while the adjectives come before the nouns in English noun phrases. The casa white is ruled out by the equivalence constraint because it does not obey the syntactic rules of English, and the blanca house is ruled out because it does not follow the syntactic rules of Spanish.

Moreover, some observations on Sankoff and Poplack's model were later pointed out by outside researchers. The observations regard that free-morpheme and equivalence constraints are insufficiently restrictive, meaning there are numerous exceptions that occur. For example, the free morpheme constraint does not account for why switching is impossible between certain free morphemes. The sentence: "The students had visto la película italiana" ("The students had seen the Italian movie") does not occur in Spanish-English code-switching, yet the free-morpheme constraint would seem to posit that it can. The equivalence constraint would also rule out switches that occur commonly in languages, as when Hindi postpositional phrases are switched with English prepositional phrases like in the sentence: "John gave a book ek larakii ko" ("John gave a book to a girl"). The phrase ek larakii ko is literally translated as a girl to, making it ungrammatical in English, and yet this is a sentence that occurs in English-Hindi code-switching despite the requirements of the equivalence constraint. Sankoff and Poplack's model focuses on the instances where code-switching does not interfere with the syntactic rule of the speaker's primary or second language. Although the model has been challenged with counter-examples collected by other researchers, there is a conclusion that most agree on. The conclusion is that the practice of code-switching demonstrates grammatical proficiency of an equivalent level as a monolingual speaker's speech competence, unlike the claims that code-switching reflects incompetence in either of the two languages of a bilingual speaker.

==== Matrix language-frame model ====
Carol Myers-Scotton's Matrix Language-Frame (MLF) model is the dominant model of insertional code-switching. The MLF model posits that there is a Matrix Language (ML) and an Embedded Language (EL). In this case, elements of the Embedded Language are inserted into the morphosyntactic frame of the Matrix Language. The hypotheses are as follows (Myers-Scotton 1993b: 7):

The Matrix Language Hypothesis states that those grammatical procedures in the central structure in the language production system which account for the surface structure of the Matrix Language + Embedded Language constituent (linguistics) are only Matrix Language–based procedures. Further, the hypothesis is intended to imply that frame-building precedes content morpheme insertion. A Matrix Language can be the first language of the speaker or the language in which the morphemes or words are more frequently used in speech, so the dominant language is the Matrix Language and the other is the Embedded Language. A Matrix Language island is a constituent composed entirely of Matrix Language morphemes.

According to the Blocking Hypothesis, in Matrix Language + Embedded Language constituents, a blocking filter blocks any Embedded Language content morpheme which is not congruent with the Matrix Language with respect to three levels of abstraction regarding subcategorization. "Congruence" is used in the sense that two entities, linguistic categories in this case, are congruent if they correspond in respect of relevant qualities.

The three levels of abstraction are:

- Even if the Embedded Language realizes a given grammatical category as a content morpheme, if it is realized as a system morpheme in the Matrix Language, the Matrix Language blocks the occurrence of the Embedded Language content morpheme. (A content morpheme is often called an "open-class" morpheme, because they belong to categories that are open to the invention of arbitrary new items. They can be made-up words like "smurf", "nuke", "byte", etc. and can be nouns, verbs, adjectives, and some prepositions. A system morpheme, e.g. function words and inflections, expresses the relation between content morphemes and does not assign or receive thematic roles.)
- The Matrix Language also blocks an Embedded Language content morpheme in these constituents if it is not congruent with a Matrix Language content morpheme counterpart in terms of theta role assignment.
- Congruence between Embedded Language content morphemes and Matrix Language content morphemes is realized in terms of their discourse or pragmatic functions.

===== Examples =====
As spoken in Hindi/English

Life ko face kiijiye with himmat and faith in yourself.

Translation:
In English

Face life with courage and faith in yourself.

As spoken in Swahili/English

Hata wengine nasikia washawekwa cell.

Translation:
In English

Even others I heard were put [in] cells.

Example 1 is consistent with the Blocking Hypothesis and the system content morpheme criteria, so the prediction is that the Hindi or Urdu equivalents are also content morphemes. Sometimes non-congruence between counterparts in the Matrix Language and Embedded Language can be circumvented by accessing bare forms. "Cell" is a bare form and so the thematic role of "cell" is assigned by the verb -wek- 'put in/on'; this means that the verb is a content morpheme.

The Embedded Language Island Trigger Hypothesis states that when an Embedded Language morpheme appears which is not permitted under either the Matrix Language Hypothesis or Blocking Hypothesis, it triggers the inhibition of all Matrix Language accessing procedures and completes the current constituent as an Embedded Language island. Embedded Language islands consist only of Embedded Language morphemes and are well-formed by Embedded Language grammar, but they are inserted in the Matrix Language frame. Therefore, Embedded Language islands are under the constraint of Matrix Language grammar.

- Swahili/English

*Sikuona your barau ambayo uliipoteza.     (Code-switching ungrammatical, English in bold)

"I didn't see your letter which you lost."       (Translation)

- Swahili/English

*Nikamwambia anipe ruhusa niende ni-ka-check for wewe.             (Code-switching, ungrammatical, English in bold)

"And I told him he should give me permission so that I go and check for you."   (Translation)

Nikamwambia anipe ruhusa niende ni-ka-check for you.                  (Code-switching, grammatical, English in bold)

Example 1 is ungrammatical (indicated by the leading asterisk) because "your" is accessed, so the Embedded Language Island Trigger Hypothesis predicts that it must be followed by an English head (e.g., "your letter") as an Embedded Language island. The reason is that possessive adjectives are system morphemes. We see the same thing happen in example 2, which is therefore ungrammatical. However, the correct way to finish the sentence is not "for wewe", switching back to Swahili; rather, it should end with "for you", which would be an Embedded Language island.

The Embedded Language Implicational Hierarchy Hypothesis can be stated as two sub-hypotheses:

1. The farther a constituent is from the main arguments of the sentence, the freer it is to appear as an Embedded Language island.
2. The more formulaic in structure a constituent is, the more likely it is to appear as an Embedded Language island. Stated more strongly, choice of any part of an idiomatic expression will result in an Embedded Language island.

The Implication Hierarchy of Embedded Language Islands:

1. Formulaic expressions and idioms (especially prepositional phrases expressing time and manner, but also as verb phrase complements)
2. Other time and manner expressions
3. Quantifier expressions
4. Non-quantifier, non-time noun phrases as verb phrase complements
5. Agent Noun phrases
6. Theme role and case assigners, i.e. main finite verbs (with full inflections)
- Wolof/French

Le matin de bonne heure ngay joge Medina pour dem juilli. Suba tee nga fa war a joge.               (Code-switching, French in bold)

"Early in the morning you leave Medina to go to pray. Early in the morning you should leave then."  (Translation)

- Arabic/English

English languageكيف هي دراستك في ال?
(Kayf heya derasatik l English language?)      (Code-switching, Arabic in bold)

"How are your English language studies going?"  (Translation)

- Swahili/English

Ulikuwa ukiongea a lot of nonsense.   (Code-switching, English in bold)

"You were talking a lot of nonsense."  (Translation)

We see example 1 work because the French Embedded Language island Le matin de bonne heure, "early in the morning", is a time expression. (Also, it is repeated in Wolof in the second sentence.) In example 2, we see the quantifier a lot of is a predicted Embedded Language island. Here we see an objective complement of a finite verb begin with the quantifier.

==== Constraint-free approach ====
Jeff MacSwan has posited a constraint-free approach to analyzing code-switching. This approach views explicit reference to code-switching in grammatical analysis as tautological, and seeks to explain specific instances of grammaticality in terms of the unique contributions of the grammatical properties of the languages involved. MacSwan characterizes the approach with the refrain, "Nothing constrains code-switching apart from the requirements of the mixed grammars." The approach focuses on the repudiation of any rule or principle which explicitly refers to code-switching itself. This approach does not recognize or accept terms such as "matrix language", "embedded language", or "language frame", which are typical in constraint-based approaches such as the MLF Model.

Rather than posit constraints specific to language alternation, as in traditional work in the field, MacSwan advocates that mixed utterances be analyzed with a focus on the specific and unique linguistic contributions of each language found in a mixed utterance. Because these analyses draw on the full range of linguistic theory, and each data set presents its own unique challenges, a much broader understanding of linguistics is generally needed to understand and participate in this style of codeswitching research.

For example, Cantone and MacSwan (2009) analyzed word order differences for nouns and adjectives in Italian-German codeswitching using a typological theory of Cinque that had been independently proposed in the syntax literature; their account derives the word order facts of Italian-German codeswitching from underlying differences between the two languages, according to Cinque's theory.

Myers-Scotton and MacSwan debated the relative merits of their approaches in a series of exchanges published in 2005 in Bilingualism: Language and Cognition, issues 8(1) and 8(2).

==== Other theories ====
Much remains to be done before a more complete understanding of code-switching phenomena is achieved. Linguists continue to debate apparent counter-examples to proposed code-switching theories and constraints.

The Closed-class Constraint, developed by Aravind Joshi, posits that closed class items (pronouns, prepositions, conjunctions, etc.) cannot be switched. The Functional Head Constraint developed by Belazi et al. holds that code-switching cannot occur between a functional head (a complementizer, a determiner, an inflection, etc.) and its complement (sentence, noun-phrase, verb-phrase). These constraints, among others like the Matrix Language-Frame model, are controversial among linguists positing alternative theories, as they are seen to claim universality and make general predictions based upon specific presumptions about the nature of syntax.

== Neuroscience ==
=== Bilingual advantage ===
Compared to their monolingual peers, bilingual children seem to have some advantage in non-linguistic tasks related to executive and attentional control. For instance, they are able to identify relevant visual information and ignore irrelevant perceptual information better than monolingual children. Bilinguals employ these executive and attentional processes daily as they need to quickly be able to select the correct vocabulary and grammar in context. According to Ena Lee and Steve Marshall, people are also able to switch from their bi/multilingual identity to a strict monolingual identity whenever they are required to do so. According to a research study, bi/Multilingual people's brains are working quicker than monolingual people's brains because they are constantly switching between different languages. When writing, bi/multilingual people tend to go through different stages of writing styles, essentially allowing them to go through the learning process in more depth compared to monolingual writers. Code-switching is a writing tool that many people use in order to communicate with similar people whenever they are struggling with formulating words or ideas.

=== Bilingual disadvantage ===
Despite the advantages to code-switching in the classroom, research has shown that bilingual children seem to have more of a disadvantage compared to their monolingual peers. For example, many of them are required to write or speak in English in American schools, rather than writing and speaking in their native languages. Ena Lee and Steve Marshall state that "many students are required to write or speak in English, causing them to push away their other known languages that make up a huge part of their identities." Oftentimes, children speak their native language at home whenever they are around their family, and then once they leave their homes they speak in English. According to Barbara Mellix, the switch in language causes a person to be careful and aware of their surroundings in order to know when it is acceptable to speak a certain language. On the contrary, whenever they feel comfortable around someone, they tend to code-switch and speak in a mixture of two languages or more. The adaptation to standard English language can be quite difficult for bi/multilingual speakers and Multilingual writers because they can feel unsupported and discouraged by the educational systems. Code-switching occurs very naturally and is hard to control for those who are fluent in more than one language.

During class writing activities, bi/multilingual students are oftentimes faced with writer's block because they are constantly thinking in more than one language, making it difficult to narrow down their ideas so that they can be expressed in a single language. It has been noted that English grammar is one of the most important yet most difficult topics in English, which even monolingual students struggle with. Code-switching makes it very difficult to follow all of standard English grammar rules because students' brains are constantly wanting to switch from one language to another, making it harder for students to formulate good grammatical sentences. According to Barbara Mellix, bi/multilingual writers can oftentimes feel "diminished" or "embarrassed" whenever they are forced to solely stick to standard English because they are afraid to be wrong and stand out in a negative way compared to their monolingual peers.

=== Neuroanatomy ===
Research has shown that the knowledge and use of more than one language alters both the anatomical and functional organization of the brain, which leads to different functional capabilities both in language and other areas. Certain regions of the bilingual brain have been repeatedly shown to differ from those of monolinguals in both size and neural activity.

One such study (Michelli et al., 2004) showed significant increase in grey matter density in the left inferior parietal cortex of bilinguals relative to monolinguals as a specific instance of experience-dependent brain plasticity. Another study (Coggins et al., 2004) showed an increase in the volume of the anterior midbody of the corpus callosum, which is involved in primary and somatosensory function, in bilinguals. The research suggests the increase is an accommodation for the increased phonemic capacity requirement of bilinguals.

==== Subcortical network ====
By using case studies of bilingual patients with cerebral lesions, researchers theorized that language switching relies on the inhibition of the non-target language using the left basal ganglia alongside executive control processes with the anterior cingulate, prefrontal, and front cortices, or bilateral supramarginal gyri and Broca's area. The dorsolateral prefrontal cortex has also been shown as significant in controlling language switching and inhibiting the unused language through observations of uncontrollable language switching in patients with damage to this brain area. Increased activation is seen in dorsolateral prefrontal cortex during language switching, but not regularly.

==== Extended control process model ====
It is postulated that the language not in use is "active" during another language's use and can be primed by a conversation. That priming is what makes it difficult to pinpoint changes in activation within any given network. Based on various studies, it is shown that the immediate spoken context affects the likelihood of a code-switch; "prior utterances can influence the activation of lexico-syntactic representations, making such representations more available for selection".

The extended control process model states the following:

"Language control signals operate on a subcortical gate that acts as a constructor of utterance plans. The gate interacts with frontal regions to select a syntactic structure and binds roles in that structure to a specific lexical content. Plans are constructed in the planning layer of competition queuing CQ network. The competitive choice layer of this network allows serial order to emerge from the parallel activation of items in the plan."

The model hypothesizes that single language use and code-switching use two different types of language control, which is competitive control and cooperative control, respectively. In competitive language control, the "gate" will only allow constructions from a single language to enter the plan. On the other hand, there are two forms of cooperative control: coupled control ("the matrix language temporarily cedes control to other language to allow intended insertion or alternation before control is returned back") and open control ("entry into the utterance planning mechanism is determined by whichever items from either language are most active at some moment in time").

=== Brain response ===
In a study published in 2001, event-related potentials (ERPs) were recorded from native English speakers as they randomly named digits in English or their L2. The results of the study showed that participants named digits slower after a language switch, regardless of the switch direction. Language switches from the L1 to L2 were characterized with an N320 ERP, indicating inhibition of unwanted lexicon, which may reflect a greater need to suppress an active L1 when using L2. However, code-switching during language comprehension, as opposed to production, did not result in an N320.

A 2002 study showed that language switches based on expected endings to sentences (from context) elicited a response consistent with code switches being treated like "unexpected events at the physical level than at the lexico-semantic level. The more proficient the bilingual in L2, the earlier the latency and the smaller the amplitude was this positivity to the code-switch."

=== Limitations ===
The lack of controlled environments for test subjects and their cognitive capabilities regarding language use and fluency has long been a concern in multilingual experimentation. Researchers try to "offset" results that follow no trends by analyzing the social and linguistic history of the populations they are testing, but a good method to standardize data patterns and variation based on individual idiolects has yet to be created and implemented.

Only a few studies have been done to measure brain activity during code switches, and so general trends cannot be expanded into larger theories without additional research.

== Examples in conversation ==
In this section, segments that are switched from the primary language of the conversation are shown in bold.

=== African-American English and Standard English ===
Children growing up in African American communities, who natively speak African-American Vernacular English (AAVE), acquire a kind of bilingualism (or bidialectism) when entering mainstream American classrooms. Teachers and academic expectations they encounter require them to use standard, higher-prestige linguistic features for school assignments and classroom participation, often effectively leading these students to develop an ability to code-switch rapidly between nonstandard AAVE and standard English features. This can pose a processing obstacle for some students who have to navigate subtle grammatical differences between the two varieties of English when interpreting prompts and instructions (see, e.g., Terry, et al., 2010 on past tense copula was/were). Age is a significant factor in determining how many AAVE forms vs. more standard forms are produced by a given student with a significant downshift in classroom AAVE production occurring around the transition from preschool to kindergarten and first grade. Craig and Washington (2004) found a reduction in five out of six morpho-syntactic characteristics studied across the transition from pre-kindergarten to kindergarten including null copula, zero articles, zero past tense, zero plurals, and zero prepositions. The bidialectism developed by these children offers similar advantages to other kinds of bilingualism including increased executive function and advances in critical thinking. As an example of this code-switching in action, see the following transcript of Rachel Jeantel's testimony in the trial of George Zimmerman for the murder of Trayvon Martin below. This transcript was analyzed in Rickford and King (2016); the bolded elements represent places where initially a null copula (indicated by the symbol ∅) was used which was switched to an overt copula ('s) when asked for clarification by the court reporter:

Prosecutor Bernie de la Rionda: "Okay. And after he used, pardon my language, he said, 'Oh, shit', what happened then?"
Rachel Jeantel: "The nigga ∅ behind me."
Court reporter: "I'm sorry, what?"
Jeantel: "[Slowly, deliberately] The nigga's behind—the nigga ∅ behind me."

The structure of African American English differs significantly from standard English, particularly in the use of the Invariant "be". An illustration of this distinction is evident in its application for habitual or repeated actions. In instances involving actions in the present with subjects other than "I," the use of a form of "be" is omitted. For actions in the past tense, "was" or "were" is employed, while present tense questions utilize a conjugated form of "be." Questions pertaining to habitual actions employ the combination of "do" and "be." Notably, the Invariant "be" also serves to indicate future actions, wherein it may be optionally combined with an auxiliary. Unlike the verb "to be", the Invariant "be" lacks variant forms such as "is", "are", or "am".

=== Cantonese and English ===
The following examples demonstrate two types of code-switching (intra-sentential and inter-sentential code-switching) by Cantonese-English bilingual children. The examples are taken from the Hong Kong Bilingual Child Language Corpus.

The first example illustrates intra-sentential code-switching, where the child Alicia (age 2) inserted the English noun apple into her Cantonese sentence:

(Cantonese is in plain text; English is in italic.)

Alicia: 食啲(sik6 di1) apple. ([in Cantonese] "Eat some apples.")

The second example displays inter-sentential code-switching, where the child Kasen (age 2) switched to Cantonese amid an English dialogical context:

(English is in italic; Cantonese is in plain text.)

Mother:  What is it? Do you know what it is?

Kasen:   我要睇(ngo5 jiu3 tai2)！我要睇(ngo5 jiu3 tai2)！([in Cantonese] "I want to see! I want to see!")

Research has found that Cantonese-English bilingual children's intra- and inter-sentential code-switching behaviour is shaped by different factors. The children's intra-sentential code-switching is influenced by parental input rather than developmental language dominance. On the other hand, the children's inter-sentential code-switching is affected by their developmental language dominance (besides pragmatic factors). In Hong Kong, intra-sentential code-switching is a common social practice among adults. Since families provide the first social environment, and interaction with parents is highly influential in socializing children's language use, parental input will have impact on children's intra-sentential code-switching. On the other hand, inter-sentential code-switching is not as common in Hong Kong. It has been proposed that, for Cantonese-English children, their inter-sentential code-switching is related to their readiness, competency, and preference of speaking the designated language of the dialogical context; hence, their inter-sentential code-switching can be affected by developmental language dominance. This finding implies that, in societies where intra-sentential (but not inter-sentential) code-switching is a common social practice, inter-sentential code-switching may serve as signs of a bilingual child's language-dominance status.

=== Tagalog and English ===
Code-switching between English and Tagalog, as well as English and other native languages, is very widespread in the Philippines. Known generally as Taglish, it has become the de facto lingua franca among the urbanized and/or educated middle class. It is largely considered the "normal acceptable conversation style of speaking and writing" in informal settings. It is so widespread that a non-native speaker can be identified easily because they predominantly use pure Tagalog, whereas a native speaker would switch freely with English.

Roger Thompson's research it suggests that the interactions between Tagalog and English depend on what is taking place. In the classroom teachers prefer students to use English. When in media the Philippines tends to prefer using Tagalog over English but in smaller social interactions people use their local dialect over both.

According to the linguist Maria Lourdes S. Bautista, there are two contrasting types of code-switching in the Philippines: deficiency-driven and proficiency-driven. Deficiency-driven code-switching is when a person is not competent in one language and thus has to switch back to the language they are more familiar with. This is common among younger children, as in the example below given by Bautista:

(English is in italic; Tagalog is in boldface.)

Mother:   Francis, why don't you play the piano for your godmother?

Francis:   Mommy, I don't want to. It's so hirap eh. ([in Tagalog] "Because it's so difficult.")

Proficiency-driven code-switching, on the other hand, is when a person is fully competent in both languages being used and can switch between them easily. It is the main type of code-switching in the islands. The example below is given by Bautista, taken from an interview with the television journalist Jessica Soho:

Sa GMA 'yung objectivity has become part na of the culture ([in Tagalog] "At GMA, objectivity has already become part of the culture.") I can tell you with a straight face na wala kaming age-agenda ([in Tagalog] "...that we have nothing like an agenda") – you know, make this person look good and that person look bad. It's really plain and simple journalism. Kung mayroon kang binira, kunin mo 'yung kabilang side ([in Tagalog] "If you attacked somebody, then get the other side") so that both sides are fairly presented.

Proficiency-driven code-switching is characterized by frequent switching of the Matrix Language (ML) between Tagalog and English, demonstrating the high proficiency of the speakers in both languages. There are also a wide range of strategies involved, including: the formation of bilingual verbs by the addition of prefixes, suffixes, and infixes (e.g. Nagsa-sweat ako = "I was sweating"); switching at the morphological, word, phrasal, or clausal levels; and the use of system morphemes (like enclitics, conjunctions, etc.) within long stretches of ML content; and even the inversion of the verb–subject–object word order of Tagalog into the subject-verb-object order of English.

According to Bautista, the reason for this type of code-switching is what she termed "communicative efficiency", wherein a speaker can "convey meaning using the most accurate, expressive, or succinct lexical items available to them." The linguist Rosalina Morales Goulet also enumerated several reasons for this type of code-switching. They are: "for precision, for transition, for comic effect, for atmosphere, to bridge or create social distance, for snob appeal, and for secrecy."

=== French and Tamil ===
This example of switching from French to Tamil comes from ethnographer Sonia Das's work with immigrants from Jaffna, Sri Lanka, to Quebec. Selvamani, who moved from Sri Lanka to Quebec as a child and now identifies as Québécois, speaks to Das in French. When Selvamani's sister, Mala, laughs, Selvamani switches to Tamil to ask Mala why she is laughing. After this aside, Selvamani continues to speak in French. Selvamani also uses the word tsé ("you know", contraction of tu sais) and the expression je me ferai pas poigner ("I will not be caught"), which are not standard French but are typical of the working-class Montreal dialect Joual.

(French is in italic; Tamil is in boldface.)

Selvamani: Parce que n'importe quand quand j'enregistre ma voix ça l'air d'un garçon.
        ([in French] "Because whenever I record my voice I sound like a boy")

         Alors, tsé, je me ferai pas poigner ([in French] "So, you know, I'm not going to be had.")

[laughter]

Selvamani: ennatā, ennatā, enna romba ciritā? ([in Tamil] "What, what, why do you laugh so much?")
        Alors, qu'est-ce que je disais? ([in French] "So, what was I saying?")

=== Hopi and Tewa ===
Researcher Paul Kroskrity offers the following example of code-switching by three elder Arizona Tewa men, who are trilingual in Tewa, Hopi, and English. They are discussing the selection of a site for a new high school in the eastern Hopi Reservation. In their two-hour conversation, the three men primarily speak Tewa; however, when Speaker A addresses the Hopi Reservation as a whole, he code-switches to Hopi. His speaking Hopi when talking of Hopi-related matters is a conversational norm in the Arizona Tewa speech community. Kroskrity reports that these Arizona Tewa men, who culturally identify themselves as Hopi and Tewa, use the different languages to linguistically construct and maintain their discrete ethnic identities.

(Tewa is in italic; Hopi is in boldface.)

Speaker A: Tututqaykit qanaanawakna. ([in Hopi] "Schools were not wanted.")

Speaker B: Wédít'ókánk'egena'adi imbí akhonidi. ([in Tewa] "They didn't want a school on their land.")

Speaker C: Naembí eeyae nąeląemo díbít'ó'ámmí kąayį'į wédimu::di.
        ([in Tewa] "It's better if our children go to school right here, rather than far away.")

=== Latin and Irish ===
Irish annals were written in Ireland between the 8th and 17th centuries by Christian monks and priests. These were fluent in both Irish and Latin and wrote the annals in both languages, often switching between them within a single sentence.

An example is given below, from the 9th-century Martyrology of Óengus that gives a spurious etymology of the prince Connadil's name:

(Irish is in italic; Latin is in boldface.)

Conadail cli buadach Connadil Essa Macc Neirc hiConnachtaib .i. Conna ise intainm. ⁊tucc sua mater perpietatem additamentum sillabæ dil .i. dil lem Conna

(Conandil victorious prince Connadil of Ess Mac nEirc in Connacht, i.e. Conna, that is the name, and his mother, out of love, joined the addition of the syllable 'dil', i.e. dear is Conna to me.)

According to the scholar Nike Stam, "Many switches consisted of inserted Latin fragments: short phrases or single words. Some of these Latin phrases appeared to be of a formulaic nature and seemed to have originated in the medieval catena tradition. They are often used to provide cross-references to other sources or to combine conflicting opinions on a text. These are phrases like ut in proverbio dicitur ["as is said in the proverb"] and ut ferunt peritii ["as experience bears out"]. Most of the language switches, however, consisted of what Muysken called alternation: longer fragments like clauses or long phrases. This type of code-switching has been linked to bilingualism in societies that are strongly diglossic, and thus suggests that the scribes compiling and writing the glosses preferred to use their two languages according to specific norms."

=== Spanish and English ===
Researcher Ana Celia Zentella offers this example from her work with Puerto Rican Spanish-English bilingual speakers in New York City. In this example, Marta and her younger sister, Lolita, speak Spanish and English with Zentella outside of their apartment building. Zentella explains that the children of the predominantly Puerto Rican neighbourhood speak both English and Spanish: "Within the children's network, English predominated, but code-switching from English to Spanish occurred once every three minutes, on average."

(English is in italic; Spanish is in boldface.)

Lolita:   Oh, I could stay with Ana?

Marta:   — but you could ask papi and mami to see if you could come down.

Lolita:  OK.

Marta:   Ana, if I leave her here would you send her upstairs when you leave?

Zentella: I'll tell you exactly when I have to leave, at ten o'clock.
        Y son las nueve y cuarto. ([in Spanish] "And it's nine fifteen.")

Marta:    Lolita, te voy a dejar con Ana. ([in Spanish] "I'm going to leave you with Ana.")
        Thank you, Ana.

== See also ==
- Bibliography of code-switching
- Bicultural identity § Cultural frame switching
- Code-switching in Hong Kong – Switching between Cantonese and English in Hong Kong
- Cultural assimilation – Adoption of features of another culture
- Gloria Anzaldua – American feminist scholar (1942–2004)
- Hegemony – Political, economic or military predominance of one state over other states
- Heteroglossia – Coexistence of multiple points of view within a language
- Linguistic interference – Influence one language has on the acquisition or intelligibility of another
- Llanito – Spanish variety spoken in Gibraltar
- Macaronic language – Text using a mixture of languages
- Metalinguistic awareness – Ability to consciously reflect on the nature of language
- Metaphorical code-switching
- Mixed language – Language that arises amongst a bilingual group
- Raciolinguistics
- Register (sociolinguistics) – Form of language used for a particular purpose or in a particular communicative situation
- Respectability politics – Political strategy
- Situational code-switching – Using different languages or language varieties in different social situations
- Style shifting – Set of linguistic variants with specific social meanings
- Translanguaging – Linguistic term coined by Cen Williams
