= Sali Tagliamonte =

Canadian linguist

- Occupation: Linguist

Academic background
- Education: University of Ottawa

Academic work
- Institutions: University of Toronto
- Main interests: Sociolinguistics, English varieties, Language change

Sali A. Tagliamonte FRSC is a Canadian linguist. Her main area of research is the field of language variation and change.

== Education ==
Tagliamonte received a Bachelor of Arts in Linguistics from York University in 1981, a Master of Arts in 1983 and a Ph.D. in 1991 in Linguistics from University of Ottawa. Her graduate thesis, supervised by Shana Poplack, looked at past temporal reference structures in Samaná English.

== Career ==
Tagliamonte has been a professor at the University of Toronto since 2001, where she currently serves as Chair of the Department of Linguistics. Tagliamonte is also an Honorary Visiting Professor in the Department of Language and Linguistic Science at the University of York. She currently holds the title of Canada Research Chair in Language Variation and Change.

Tagliamonte held a number of professional positions before joining the faculty of the University of Toronto. From 1995 to 2002 she held the position of adjunct professor at the Linguistics Department at University of Ottawa. She was a lecturer at the University of York on two occasions, in 1995 and 2000, and held a position of Visiting Assistant Professor there in 2001 until she became a professor at the University of Toronto.

Tagliamonte's widely-cited research has focused on varieties of English. In particular, her work has focused on Ontario English, including projects related to speech communities looking at various communities in Toronto, North Bay, South Porcupine, Kirkland Lake, Haliburton, Almonte, Wilno, Kapuskasing and Barry's Bay. She also collaborated with Jennifer Smith (sociolinguist) FRSE on dialects in Scotland and North America. Tagliamonte has also worked on internet and youth language. She is a co-creator of a variable rule program, Goldvarb.

== Honors ==
Tagliamonte was a Killam Research Fellow from 2013-2015 and has been a Fellow of the Royal Society of Canada since 2013.

She was a media expert for the Linguistic Society of America in 2013. She was an associate editor of Language from 2007-2010.

In 2017, Tagliamonte was inducted as a Fellow of the Linguistic Society of America.

== Selected publications ==
- Shana Poplack and Sali A. Tagliamonte. (1989) There’s no tense like the present: Verbal -s inflection in early Black English. Language Variation and Change 1.1: 47–84.
- Sali A. Tagliamonte. (1998) Was/were variation across the generations: View from the city of York. Language Variation and Change. 10:2: 153–191.
- Sali A. Tagliamonte and Rachel Hudson. (1999). Be like et al. beyond America: The quotative system in British and Canadian youth. Journal of Sociolinguistics. 3:2: 147–172.
- Sali A. Tagliamonte and Shana Poplack. (2001) African American English in the diaspora: Tense and aspect. Oxford: Blackwell.
- Sali A. Tagliamonte. (2001) Come/came variation in English dialects. American Speech. 76.1: 42–61.
- Sali A. Tagliamonte and Chris Roberts. (2005) So weird; so cool; so innovative: The use of intensifiers in the television series Friends. American Speech. 80.3: 280–300
- Sali A. Tagliamonte. (2006) Analysing Sociolinguistic Variation. Cambridge: Cambridge University Press.
- Sali A. Tagliamonte. (2012) Variationist Sociolinguistics: Change, Observation, Interpretation. Wiley-Blackwell Publishers.
- Sali A. Tagliamonte. (2013) Roots of English: Exploring the History of Dialects. Cambridge: Cambridge University Press.
- Sali A. Tagliamonte. (2016) Teen Talk: The Language of Adolescents. Cambridge: Cambridge University Press.
