= Journal of Language and Social Psychology =

- Discipline: Communication, psychology
- Language: English
- Edited by: Howard Giles

Publication details
- History: Since 1982
- Publisher: SAGE Publications (United States)
- Frequency: Quarterly
- Impact factor: 1.233 (2017)

Standard abbreviations
- ISO 4: J. Lang. Soc. Psychol.

Indexing
- ISSN: 0261-927X (print); 1552-6526 (web)
- LCCN: 93648947
- OCLC no.: 9016161

Links
- Journal homepage; Online access; Online archive

Journal of Language and Social Psychology is a peer-reviewed academic journal that publishes papers in the fields of communication and psychology. The journal's editor is Howard Giles (University of California Santa Barbara). It has been in publication since 1982 and is currently published by SAGE Publications.

== Scope ==
Journal of Language and Social Psychology is devoted to the social psychology of language. The journal publishes reports of research and theory at the crossroads of language, mind and society. Journal of Language and Social Psychology presents articles from a range of disciplines including linguistics, cognitive science and anthropology with a focus on quantitative, experimental studies and positivistic theory.

== Abstracting and indexing ==
Journal of Language and Social Psychology is abstracted and indexed in, among other databases, SCOPUS and the Social Sciences Citation Index. According to the Journal Citation Reports, its 2017 impact factor is 1.233, ranking it 46 out of 64 journals in the category "Psychology, Social", 59 out of 181 journals in the category "Linguistics", and 45 out of 84 journals in the category "Communication".
