= Jennifer Smith (sociolinguist) =

Sociolinguist professor, Fellow of the Royal Society of Edinburgh

Professor Jennifer Smith FRSE
- Education: MA in Linguistics University of Durham PhD in 2000 from the University of York
- Occupation: Professor of sociolinguistics
- Employer: The University of Glasgow School of Critical Studies
- Known for: sociolinguistic studies in Scottish dialects and colonial English
- Notable work: Scottish Syntax Atlas

Jennifer Smith is a sociolinguistic specialist in language variation and dialects, especially Scottish dialects across the generations and geography of Scotland, including developing the Scottish syntax atlas which analyses the diversity. Her research also covers variations in colonial English, for example, in North America. Professor of sociolinguistics at the University of Glasgow School of Critical Studies, she teaches and researches language and variation theory.

== Biography ==
Originally from Buckie, and speaking in that dialect, Smith taught English in Athens before studying for her MA in Linguistics at Durham University. Her doctorate was completed at the University of York (2000) on Synchrony and Diachrony of English: Evidence from Scotland. She was a lecturer at York before becoming professor of linguistics at the University of Glasgow, School of Critical Studies. In 2009 she took time off for health reasons, recovering from ovarian cancer and married her long term partner.

In addition to her own teaching and research interests, Smith is the research convenor of English Language and Linguistics at Glasgow, and is an external examiner for the University of Sheffield, Queen Mary, University of London, Lancaster University and the Open University. She is a PhD examiner for Newcastle University, Trinity College Dublin (2014) and the Université Paris Ouest Nanterre La Défense. She is also a member of the ESRC Virtual College and Assessor for the Natural Science Foundation and Deutsche Forschungsgemeinschaft.

== Publications and editorships ==
Smith is on the Editorial Board of the Journal of Linguistics and is a reviewer for articles for that journal and for Language Variation & Change, Journal of Sociolinguistics, Journal of Child Language. She also is a monograph reviewer for academic publishers Mouton, CUP and OUP. Smith was co-editor in 2017 of Studies in Middle and Modern English: Historical Variation. Series: Studies in the history of the English language, and also previously (in 2014) of Studies in Middle and Modern English: Historical Change. Series: Studies in the history of the English language.

Research with Sali Tagliamonte of the University of Toronto covered variations in sociolinguistic specifics as well as North American variants. Her work with Sophie Holmes-Elliott of Queen Mary University of London was on certain sounds, and findings were presented at the 18th International Congress of Phonetic Sciences.

Smith's (currently 38) key research articles are listed by the Glasgow University School of Critical Studies, and includes work on caregiver and child communications, and other early years dialect learning, presented in articles and at international conferences .

She recently (2019) worked with Mercedes Durham of Cardiff University on a book on sociolinguistic variation in children's language. She had previously contributed a chapter to the Routledge Companion to Sociolinguistics on the analysis of morphosyntactic variation (2007), and wrote the foreword to Sociolinguistics in Scotland (2014).

=== Research communications ===
Smith has communicated in press and social media about her research, such as the computer modelling showing that local dialects are thriving both in terms of words and sounds, and also sentence structures, such that some Scots are considered bilingual. She also spoke about the variation in perceived attractiveness of a voice or the adoption of 'posh' voices for circumstances, including the modern need to instruct technology (voice activation) in a tendency to use slower and more formal speaking ('tech tongue').

Jennifer Smith was made a Fellow of the Royal Society of Edinburgh in 2021.
