= Communication accommodation theory =

Theory that people adjust speech style to listeners

Howard Giles' communication accommodation theory (CAT), "seeks to explain and predict when, how, and why individuals engage in interactional adjustments with others," such as a person changing their accent to match the individual they are speaking with. Additionally, CAT studies "recipients' inferences, attributions, and evaluations of, and responses to, them." This means when speakers change their communication style, listeners are interpreting such alterations. For example, when the speaker adjusts their accent to match the listener's, the recipient may interpret this positively, perceiving it as the speaker trying to fit in, or negatively—questioning whether they are mocking them.

The basis of CAT lies in the idea that people adjust (or accommodate) their style of speech and nonverbal behavior to one another. Convergence is a form of accommodation in which there are changes in the kinesics (face and body motion), haptics (touch), physical appearance, chronemics (time use), artifacts (personal objects), proxemics (personal space), oculesics (the study of eye behavior), paralanguage (vocal qualities), to more similarly mirror the style of the person with whom they are speaking. The concept was later applied to the field of sociolinguistics, in which linguistic accommodation or simply accommodation refers to the changes in language use and style that individuals make to increase the social familiarity or intimacy between themselves and others.

In contrast, divergence "is a communication strategy of accentuating the differences between you and another person." For example, when a native French speaker uses complex terms that a novice learner might not understand, this divergence highlights the difference in competence between the speaker and the listener. By using difficult terminology, the native speaker is highlighting their proficiency while emphasizing the novice's inexperience. This creates a barrier that separates them, conveying the message, "We're not the same." Both of these are active processes that can occur either subconsciously (without the speaker recognizing what they are doing), or consciously, where the speaker intentionally makes these nonverbal and verbal adjustments.

The body of CAT is full of "Accommodative norms, competences, resources, and energies are fundamental characteristics of social interaction and communication in social media and those involving other new technologies, allowing the individuals and groups involved to manage variable conversational goals, identities, and power differentials between and among themselves."

"During the 1970s, social psychologists Giles, Taylor, and Bourhis laid the foundations of what was then named speech accommodation theory (SAT) out of dissatisfaction with socio-linguistics and its descriptive (rather than explanatory) appraisal of linguistic variation in social contexts, as well as to provide the burgeoning study of language attitudes with more theoretical bite". The speech accommodation theory was developed to demonstrate all of the value of social psychological concepts to understanding the dynamics of speech. It sought to explain "... the motivations underlying certain shifts in people's speech styles during social encounters and some of the social consequences arising from them." Particularly, it focused on the cognitive and affective processes underlying individuals' convergence and divergence through speech. The communication accommodation theory has broadened this theory to include not only speech but also the "non-verbal and discursive dimensions of social interaction". CAT has also created a different perspective from other research in language and social interaction—and communication more generally—that focuses on either interpersonal or intergroup communication.

== Social psychology and social identity theory ==
Like speech accommodation theory, communication accommodation theory continues to draw from social psychology, particularly from four main socio-psychology theories: similarity-attraction, social exchange, causal attribution and intergroup distinctiveness. These theories help to explain why speakers seek to converge or diverge from the language, dialect, accent and behavior of their interlocutors. CAT also relies heavily in social identity theory. This latter theory argues that a person's self-concept comprises a personal identity and a social identity, and that this social identity is based in comparisons people make between in-groups (groups they belong to) and out-groups (groups they do not belong to).

According to social identity theory, people strive to maintain a positive social identity by either joining groups where they feel more comfortable or making a more positive experience of belonging to the groups they already belong to. Since speech is a way to express group membership, people adopt convergence or divergence in communication to "signal a salient group distinctiveness, so as to reinforce a social identity". Communication accommodation thus, becomes a tool to emphasize group distinctiveness in a positive way, and strengthen the individual's social identity. There are four main socio-psychological theories:

=== Similarity-attraction ===
Similarity-attraction is one of the biggest contributors to the theory of communication accommodation. The similarity-attraction theory posits that "The more similar our attitudes and beliefs are to those of others, the more likely it is for them to be attracted to us." Convergence through verbal and non-verbal communication is one of the mechanisms that we can use to become more similar to others, increasing their attraction towards us. For this reason, it can be said that one of the factors that leads individuals to use convergence is a desire to obtain social approval from their interlocutor. It could hence be concluded that "the greater one's need for social approval, the greater will be one's tendency to converge". Natalé (1975), for instance, has found that speakers with high needs for approval converge more to another's vocal intensity and pause length than those with low needs for approval. An individual on the receiving end of high level of accommodation is likely to develop a greater sense of self-esteem and satisfaction than being a receiver of low accommodation.

=== Social exchange process ===
The social exchange process theory "... states that prior to acting, we attempt to assess the rewards and costs of alternate courses of action", and that we tend to choose whatever course of action will bring greater rewards and less costs. The Social Exchange Theory is a theory that looks at how people evaluate their relationships. Throughout the process of evaluating relationships, individuals want to feel as if they are receiving more from the relationship than they are expending within the relationship. In other words, people like to be in relationships where the rewards outweigh the costs. Although most often convergence can bring forth rewards, there are some occasions when it can also bring forth costs such as "increased effort to converge, a loss of perceived integrity and personal (and sometimes group) identity". Hence, when choosing whether or not to use convergence, people assess these costs and rewards.

=== Causal attribution process ===
The causal attribution theory "[s]uggests that we interpret other people's behavior, and evaluate the individual themselves, in terms of the motivations and intentions that we attribute as the cause of their behavior" It applies to convergence in that convergence might be viewed positively or negatively depending on the causes we attribute to it: "Although interpersonal convergence is generally favorably received, and non-convergence generally unfavorably received, the extent to which this holds true will undoubtedly be influenced by the listeners attributions of the speaker's intent." Giles and Smith provide the example of an experiment that they conducted amongst French and English speaking Canadians to illustrate this. In this experiment, when individuals believed that the person from the different group used language convergence to reduce cultural barriers, they evaluated it more positively than when they attributed it to the pressures of the situation. "When French Canadian listeners attributed an English Canadian's convergence to French as due to his desire to break down cultural barriers, the shift was viewed favorably. However, when this same behavior was attributed to pressures in the situation forcing the other to converge, positive feelings were not so strongly evoked."

=== Intergroup distinctiveness ===
The process of intergroup distinctiveness, as theorized by Tajfel argues, "... when members of different groups are in contact, they compare themselves on dimensions that are important to them, such as personal attributes, abilities, material possessions and so forth." In these "intergroup social comparisons" individuals seek to find ways to make themselves positively distinct from the out-group to enhance their social identity. Because speech style and language is an important factor in defining social groups, divergence in speech style or language is often used to maintain intergroup distinctiveness and differentiate from the out-group, especially when group membership is a salient issue or the individual's identity and group membership is being threatened.

== Assumptions ==
Many of the principles and concepts from social identity theory are also applicable to communication accommodation theory. Under the influence of social psychology, especially social identity theory, communication accommodation theory are guided by mainly four assumptions.

- There are speech and behavioral similarities and dissimilarities in all conversations.
- The way we perceive the speech and behaviors of another determines our evaluation of the conversation.
- Language and behaviors have the ability to communicate social status and group belonging between people in a conversation.
- Norms guide the accommodation process, which varies in its degree of appropriateness.

The first assumption indicates that people bring their past experience to conversations. Therefore, communication is influenced by situational conditions and initial reactions but also the "social-historical context in which the interaction is embedded". The prior experiences people have with others can influence their communication in the future and how they accommodate others. People's attitudes and beliefs, derived from those factors, determine the extent to which they are willing to accommodate in a conversation. The more similarities that they share with each other, the more likely for them to accommodate.

The second assumption is concerned with how people perceive and evaluate a conversation. Perception is '"the process of attending to and interpreting a message'", and evaluation is the "process of judging a conversation". Someone who enters a conversation usually first observes what takes place and then decides whether he should adjust to fit in. An example would be walking into the break room at work where two other coworkers are discussing a birthday celebration for the boss, the person who walked in would evaluate what they are talking about and determine how to proceed. They would decide if they should join the conversation or acknowledge the two coworkers and leave. If they decided to join the conversation, they would determine how they should communicate based on the people they are talking to and the situation. However, the decision about accommodation is not always necessary. If two strangers meet, they may have a random small talk and simply say goodbye. Then, neither of them is likely to evaluate the conversation since they have little chance of meeting again.

The importance of language and behavior is illustrated in the third assumption since they are indicators of social status and group belongings. When two people who speak different languages try to have a conversation, the language used is more likely to be the one used by the higher status person. This occurs for two reasons. First, the individual with lower status likely desires approval and liking from the individual with higher status, and because similarity increases liking, this desire leads to convergence. Second, when an individual recognizes they hold a higher status than the person they are communicating with, they are not likely to converge to the communication behavior of the lower status individual; in fact, they are likely to diverge. In this example, the lower status individual has no choice but to converge to the language of the higher status individual. That idea of "salient social membership" negotiation is illustrated well during an interview, as the interviewee usually makes all efforts to identify with the interviewer by accommodating the way that is spoken and behaved to raise the chance of getting the job. Once again, this is because the interviewer knows they have a higher status than the interviewee and therefore will not converge to their communication behavior. The interviewee desires liking, which is achieved through similarity. In order to achieve similarity, the interviewee must converge to the communication behavior of the interviewer.

The last assumption puts emphasis on social appropriateness and norms. Here, norms are defined as "expectations of behaviors that individuals feel should or should not occur in a conversation". Those expectations give guidance to people's behaviors, helping them to figure out the appropriate way to accommodate. Most of the time, the accommodation made according to those norms are perceived socially appropriate. For instance, when a young person talks to the seniors in the family, he should avoid using jargons among his generation to show respect and to communicate more smoothly. If the communicator is not careful, this can result in stereotyping if the communicator is not sure about the norms the other person considers to be socially appropriate. Making incorrect assumptions can be more harmful for the relationship than helpful.

== Convergence and divergence ==
=== Convergence ===
Convergence refers to the process through which an individual shifts speech patterns in interaction so that they more closely resemble the speech patterns of speech partners. People can converge through many features of communication such as their use of language, their "pronunciation, pause and utterance lengths, vocal intensities, non verbal behaviors, and intimacy of self disclosures" (Giles and Smith, 1979, 46), but they do not necessarily have to converge simultaneously at all of these levels. In fact, people can both converge at some levels and diverge through others at the same time. People use convergence based on their perceptions of others, as well as what they are able to infer about them and their backgrounds. Attraction (likability, charisma, credibility), also triggers convergence. As Turner and West note, "When communicators are attracted to others they will converge in their conversations." On the other hand, as the similarity attraction theory highlights, when people have similar beliefs, personality and behaviors they tend to be more attracted towards each other. To achieve a "desired social distance" (Pardo, 2016), people use language to converge more towards a conversational partner they are attracted to.

The desire to make social interaction flow subsequently results in convergence. Many people tend to converge with one another because they want to feel a sense of fitting in and experience social approval to the people around them. Thus, when one individual shifts speech and non-verbal behaviors in order to assimilate to the other it can result in a more favorable appraisal of him, that is: when convergence is perceived positively it is likely to enhance both the conversation and the attraction between the listener and the speaker. For this reason it could be said that convergence reflects "an individual's desire for social approval" from his interlocutor, and that the greater the individual's need for social approval, the more likely he or she is to converge. Besides attraction, other factors that "influence the intensity of this" need of approval and hence the level of convergence "include the probability of future interactions, the social status of the addressee, and interpersonal variability for need of social approval".

Other factors that determine whether and to what extent individuals converge in interaction are their relational history, social norms and power variables. Because individuals are more likely to converge to the individual with the higher status it is likely that the speech in a conversation will reflect the speech of the individual with the higher status. Converging also increases the effectiveness of communication, which in turn lowers uncertainty, interpersonal anxiety, and increases mutual understanding. This is another factor that motivates people to converge. People adapt their communication behaviors to establish common ground with another individual. This includes vocal tone/volume, word choice, etc. Social distance is the extent to which two people that are communicating with each other are similar or different. Discourse management is the selection of topics in communication that lead to successful exchanges and minimizing social distance.

There is, however, the chance of the message sender displaying overconvergence (or overaccommodation). This is when the communicator adjusts to a style that they have little or no experience in, which can often be the result of stereotyping. It is "an attempt to overdo efforts in regulating, modifying or responding to others. It has the effect of making the target feel worse." Some examples may be speaking to an elderly person in "baby talk" regardless of their mental or psychological state, shouting or exaggerating other behaviors when speaking to a blind person, or speaking very slowly or simply when communicating with someone who is not fluent in our language. Though the message sender often has good intentions when overaccommodating, it can actually further alienate them from the receiver.

=== Divergence ===
Divergence is a linguistic strategy whereby a member of a speech community accentuates the linguistic differences between themself and their interlocutor. Divergence can be accomplished in one of two ways: (1) purposefully not changing your communication behavior because it is already different from that of your communication partner or (2) changing your communication behavior so that it is different from that of your communication partner when it would naturally be similar. "Given that communication features are often core dimensions of what it is to be a member of a group, divergence can be regarded as a very important tactic of displaying a valued distinctiveness from the other." This helps to sustain a positive image of one's in-group and hence to strengthen one's social identity. Divergence is commonly used to establish dominance or power in an interaction. For example, if a recent college graduate becomes a professor, they might be teaching students who are around the same age as them. Therefore, it is important for the professor to communicate in a way that the students are aware the professor has more authority than them.

Another case where there is a need for divergence is when professionals are with clients. In a 2001 study, doctors and patients discussed musculoskeletal disorders and it was observed that there were miscommunications that occurred because the participants chose to converge during the communication rather than to accentuate their position differences. Patients in the study felt more comfortable discussing their problems because they felt "positive about their doctor's capacity to understand them". Divergence can be used to separate the speaker from a group or person, their speech patterns change based on who they are talking to and how they feel about that person. Communicating in a fashion to make speech different can also be interpreted as a sign of dislike towards a person or group. For example, "when you run into a disliked classmate from high school, your vocal pattern becomes more different from that classmate's." This represents the act of divergence because you are purposely changing your speech to not sound like that person.

== Components ==
Further research conducted by Gallois et al. in 1995 has expanded the theory to include 17 propositions that influence these processes of convergence and divergence. They are categorized into four main components: the sociohistorical context, the communicators' accommodative orientation, the immediate situation and evaluation and future intentions. These components are essential to Communication accommodation Theory and affect the course and outcome of intercultural conversations.

=== Sociohistorical context ===
The sociohistorical context refers to ways that past interactions between groups the communicators belong to influence the communication behaviors of the communicators. It includes "the relations between the groups having contact and the social norms regarding contact". These relations between the different groups the communicators belong to influence the communicators' behavior. Socio-historical factors that influence communicators include political or historical relations between nations, and different religious or ideological views of the two groups participating in the conversation.

=== Accommodative orientation ===
Accommodative orientation refers to the communicator's "... tendencies to perceive encounters with out group members in interpersonal terms, intergroup terms, or a combination of the two". There are three factors that are crucial to accommodative orientations: (1) "intrapersonal factors" (e.g. personality of the speakers), (2) "intergroup factors" (e.g. communicators' feelings toward outgroups), and (3) "initial orientations" (e.g., perceived potential for conflict). Issues that influence this last factor include: collectivistic culture context or whether the culture is collectivistic or individualistic; distressing history of interaction, the possible tensions that exist between groups due to past interactions; stereotypes; norms for treatment of groups; and high group solidarity/ high group dependence, how dependent the person's self-worth is in the group.

=== Immediate situation ===
The immediate situation refers to the moment when the actual communication takes place. It is shaped by five interrelated aspects: (1) sociopsychological states, (2) goals and addressee focus (e.g., motivations and goals for the encounter), (3) sociolinguistic strategies (e.g., convergence or divergence), (4) behavior and tactics (e.g., topic, accent) and (5) labeling and attributions.

=== Evaluation and future intentions ===
This aspect deals with how communicators perceive their conversational partners' behavior and its effects on future encounters between the two groups. Positively rated conversations will most likely lead to further communication between the interlocutors and other members of their respective groups.

== In action ==
In 1991, Giles, Coupland, and Coupland expressed the belief that a "more qualitative perspective" would be necessary to get more diverse and clarifying explanations of the behaviors presented within varying contexts. They referred to this as "the applied perspective" that showed accommodation theory as a vital part of day-to-day activity as opposed to solely being a theoretical construct. They sought to "demonstrate how the core concepts and relationships invoked by accommodation theory are available for addressing altogether pragmatic concerns". For Giles, Coupland, and Coupland, these "pragmatic concerns" were extremely varied in nature.

One of these "pragmatic concerns" included understanding the relational issues that present themselves in the medical and clinical fields, such as the relational "alternatives, development, difficulties, and outcomes" that affected the patients' contentment with their medical interactions—and whether or not, through these interactions, they agreed with and implemented said health care regimens. Another of these situations involved the potential options in a legal arena. The way that the judges, plaintiffs, and defendants accommodated themselves to both the situation and the jury could manipulate the jury's acceptance or rejection of the defendant, and could, thus, control the outcome of the case.

Communication accommodation theory was also found to have a place in media. In regards to radio broadcasting, the alliance of the audience with the broadcaster played an important part in both the ratings that the shows would receive and whether the show progressed or was cancelled.

In the area of jobs and employment, accommodation theory was believed to influence the satisfaction one has with his or her job and the productivity that that person possesses in said job through convergence with or divergence from the co-workers and their work environment.

Accommodation theory also possessed practical applications in the development of learning a second language. This was seen when the student's education of and proficiency in said language was either assisted or hindered by accommodative measures. Giles, Coupland, and Coupland (1991) also addressed the part that accommodation theory plays in a situation they called language switching, when bilingual individuals must decide which language they should speak when they are in an organizational environment with other bilingual individuals. This can be an incredibly important choice to make, especially in a business setting, because an incorrect judgment in this area of communication could unwittingly promote negative reactions between the two or more parties involved. In addition, accommodation theory was strongly intertwined with the way an immigrant accepts and is accepted by their host country. An instance of over-accommodation from the immigrating individual can unintentionally damage that person's sense of individuality while a strong divergence from the immigrating individual from their host culture can prompt the natives of the host country to react negatively to them because of the immigrating individual's use of divergence.

The final area of practical application, as presented by Giles, Coupland, and Coupland (1991), was that of accommodation theory's effect on the lives of people with disabilities. Accommodation theory was thought to either aid them by promoting them to "fulfill their communicative and life potentials", or by hindering them from reaching their full potential by focusing on the disability that made them different rather than the other characteristics that made them similar to their peers.

Despite the fact that communication accommodation theory is theoretical, it has shown itself to be viable by its numerous practical applications.

== Criticisms ==
Communication accommodation theory has been criticized by Judee Burgoon, Leesa Dillman, and Lesa Stern (1993). These scholars questioned the "convergence-divergence frame [and] believe that conversations are too complex to be reduced simply" to the processes of the communication accommodation theory. They "challenge the notion that people's accommodation can be explained by just the practice of [convergence-divergence]", raising the question of the potential consequences to the listener and speaker if they "both converge and diverge in conversations", as well as whether race or ethnicity play a role in the process. Though CAT addresses potential conflicts between interlocutors, it assumes these conflicts will be based on "a reasonable standard of conflict", and not every communicator will engage in a "rational way of communicating".

== Application ==
Communication accommodation theory examines "the role of conversations in our lives". It has been incorporated into "the mass media (Bell, 1991), with families (Fox, 1999), with Chinese students (Hornsey and Gallois, 1998), with elderly (Harwood, 2002), on the job (McCroskey and Richmond, 2000), in interviews (Willemyns, Gallois, Callan, and Pittam, 1997), and even with messages left on telephone answering machines (Buzzanell, Burrell, Stafford, and Berkowitz, 1996)". The theory tends to be heuristic because it is "expansive enough to be complete, and has been supported by research from diverse authors". CAT's "core processes of convergence and divergence make it relatively easy to understand, underscoring the simplicity of the theory".

== Intergenerational communications ==
Researchers of communication accommodation theory who have been interested in conversations between the elderly and the young, actively apply this theory to analyze intergenerational communication situations. Since the aging of population is becoming a serious issue in current society, communication difficulties of older adults and issues like ageism should be addressed. According to mainstream sociolinguistic studies, age is regarded as a variable only to the extent that it may show patterns of dialectal variation within speech communities across time. However, the existence of potentially important generational differences relating to beliefs about talk, situational perceptions, interactional goals, and various language devices between the young and the elderly are all taken into account as empirical questions in their own right when using communication accommodation theory to explore intergenerational communication problems and improve effectiveness. Previous researchers have also developed models such as the communication predicament model of ageing, and the communication enhancement model of ageing, to point out numerous consequences brought by both negative and positive attitudes towards aging.

=== Young-to-elderly language strategies ===
Even though young people are more likely to perceive the old by multiple stereotypes, the elderly are negatively evaluated in most situations, resulting in a reduction of meaningful communication. To further illustrate this, Ryan et al. devised a typology of four young-to-elderly language strategies in his research concerning psycho linguistic and social psychological components of communication with the elderly, addressing a problem for the elderly that they are vulnerable to the social and psychological circumstances of isolation, neglect, and negative stereotyping. However, it is not appropriate to see problematic intergenerational talk as a one-sided affair since both the young and the old can be responsible for miscommunication and unsuitable accommodation.

The first of these is characterized as over-accommodation due to physical or sensory handicaps, which happens when speakers talk to handicapped recipients, usually those with hearing impairment, and adapt their speech beyond the optimal level. This is also known as "Elderspeak", a form of baby talk in which a person addresses the elderly in an overly simple and sometimes patronizing way.

The second strategy is labelled as dependency-related over-accommodation, which refers to overbearing, excessively directive and disciplinary speech to the elderly. "It was conjectured that this strategy is encoded as one of the means by which a younger person can control the relationship and induce the elderly individual to become dependent on the former".

Age-related divergence is the third strategy. This tenet proposes that young speakers may seek to amplify the distinctiveness of their own social group by purposefully acting in ways that differ from their stereotype of old speakers. Older speakers might be seen as in physical and mental decline; slowing down with age and unable to keep pace with the current social norms. These young speakers, attempting to differentiate themselves from this image, will talk faster, use fashionable colloquialism and slang, and express more "modern" ideas and values in their communication with seniors.

The fourth strategy is intergroup over-accommodation and it is considered one of the most pervasive of young-to-elderly language strategies. The "simple perception of an addressee's social category membership being old – and, independently of a particular handicap (if any), considerations of dependency and in-group symbolization are sufficient to invoke negative physical, social, and psychological inferences for many younger people".

=== Communication between old and young people in various relationships ===
Giles has studied the interaction of young and elderly persons in business settings using communication accommodation as a theoretical framework. Findings demonstrated that elderly persons tend to be less accommodating than their younger counterparts. Findings also demonstrated that, for example, in business settings, one is much more likely to accommodate and converge to the language of a superior, such as a manager, than to someone with less or equal amount of superiority, such as a co-worker. While several other factors came into play, convergence, and divergence portions of this theory were used in interpreting and explain this phenomenon.

The prevalence of and consequences for ageism and ageist language in intergenerational interactions in health care contexts such as hospitals and long-term care facilities have also been discussed. Factors such as negative ageist stereotypes and unique features of the older adult patient-physician interaction can result in miscommunication between physicians and patients. Moreover, individuals are more likely to use patronizing language styles, to evaluate patronizing communication positively, and less likely to respond assertively to ageist language in hospital settings than in community dwellings. In the domain of mental health care for older individuals, research also suggests that the elderly are systematically disadvantaged when interacting with mental health professionals.

=== Generation Z ===
Additionally, more research has been done with a focus on Gen Z as they enter the workforce with Gen Y and Millennials. Due to the generational differences in how they communicate compared to the latter, it raises questions on how communication accommodation influences these dynamics. In 2021, Carradini and Janssen looked at Gen Z's communication habits and expectations in the workplace. They found that they hold different attitudes towards personal preferences, professional behaviors, self-efficacy of technology use, and ideas surrounding work-life balance. Their findings suggests that their ability to adapt to the socially accepted norm in these workplaces will slow communication, and perhaps lead to divergence amongst them, but also give way to positive changes. With generational gaps at play, it can lead to ineffective communication practices, which can hurt businesses and slow relationship building. In 2020, Bredbenner and Parcell found that Gen Z prefer face-to-face communication with leadership in the workplace verses digital communication. Yet, when analyzing digital communication, they found that the older generations will accommodate Gen Z by using text messaging. This is a promising find given the increase of millennials entering leadership positions. With levels of engagement an important factor for workplace cohesiveness, it calls for transparent communication between employees and those who manage them. In 2019, Natalie Kompa focused her thesis on this exact ideal, finding that Gen Z's commitment to their organizations, trust, job satisfaction, and feelings of control mutuality, were highly correlated with communication transparency. Moreover, the older generations need to accommodate the younger generations communication styles and preferences, in order to motivate and build valuable relationships with them.

== Communication between genders ==
During communication interactions, there are distinct differences in how men speak in comparison to women. Women and men do not have the same communicative behavior in same-sex situations and in mixed-sex situations. This means that they accommodate their communicative style to their interaction partners' gender. For example, feminine individuals are more accommodating than masculine individuals, as "feminine language" is viewed as more considerate, cooperative, helpful, submissive, and accommodating.

In the past century, "decades of research on FtF communication suggests that females and males sometimes use different communicative strategies". When individuals enter a face-to-face (FtF) conversation, men and women have clear differences in their goals for how the conversation will take place. Currently, "literature explaining gender differences in nonverbal communication often revolves around asymmetrical power relationships between males and females, which could be interpreted as another explanation of the theory of speech accommodation". In other words, different genders communicate non-verbally based on their goals revolving around power. Through current research available, it has been emphasized that "women have been shown to be more accommodating than men, especially those who may follow traditional sex roles". From an early age each gender is conditioned to meet societal expectations and research has indicated that men's choices to be less accommodating is centered on "their concern for connectedness and societal power". In this sense, "women thus are often denied access to speech, a fundamental tool of power". Men are more prone to use language that allows them to "establish control of the conversation topic and hold the floor". An example of this would involve how communication interactions with men will often involve them using interruptions as a controlling communication behavior. However, one study found that "people accommodate their conversants' speech style (more man-like or woman-like) more than to their actual gender". In other words, two people in a conversation may focus their accommodation style to match the interactant's conversation style as it may not match the gender that they present as. The use of CAT provides a "theoretical framework for how gender identities are negotiated during an interaction and the effects on communicative behavior" of those involved in the dyadic interaction."

== Intercultural communications ==
Since communication accommodation theory applies to both interpersonal and inter-group communication one of the fields in which it has been most applied has been in intercultural communication. Within this field it has been applied to explain and analyze communication behaviors in a variety of situations, such as interactions between non-native and natives during second language acquisition processes, and interactions between inter-ethnic groups.

Studies show the comparison of communication accommodation in foreign countries between tourists and locals. In countries with heavy tourism, many being Third World, it is common that the actual tourists have little to no competency in, or desire of having competency in the language and style of communication of the local natives. On the other hand, the country's local economy as well as the livelihood of its citizens, heavily depends on these tourists. Therefore, there is a great need to accommodate the communication styles of the tourists.

In a 2021 study, Presbitero examined the role of communication accommodation in global virtual teams. Global virtual teams are groups of colleagues from different countries working together virtually through platforms such as Zoom, Microsoft Teams, and Slack. Presbitero found a positive correlation between cultural intelligence and convergence, meaning that when colleagues have a higher level of knowledge about the cultures of their colleagues, they are more likely to converge to their communication behavior. Presbitero also found that convergence mediates the relationship between cultural intelligence and synergy, or how well colleagues work together, as well as the relationship between cultural intelligence and direction, or setting and working toward group norms. This means that whether or not an individual's level of knowledge of their colleagues' culture impacts how well they work together and their ability to set and work toward group norms depends on whether or not the individual converges to their colleague's communication behavior. Presbitero's research is crucial to our increasingly global workforce, especially with the advent of technology that allows individuals in different countries with different cultures to work together.

== Communication between native and non-native language speakers in second language acquisition ==
=== Non-native language speakers ===
The input that non-native speakers (NNS) obtain from their interlocutors during second language acquisition is crucial in their process of language learning. For instance, as the similarity attraction theory predicts, non-native speakers (NNS) are more likely to converge towards the native speaker's (NS) language when they identify him or her as similar to themselves: "When an NNS and an NS share important social identities, ethnic or not, the NNS will be more likely to converge towards the NS's language use". In a study conducted by Young (1998) for instance, high proficiency Chinese English Language Second Speakers interviewed by individuals with a higher degree of social convergence in terms of ethnicity, sex, occupation, educational level, place of origin, and age were significantly more likely to converge to their interlocutor's standard English plural conjunction than those who were interviewed by subjects that differed more in terms of these social characteristics. Unlike previous studies that focussed mostly in ethnic solidarity to explain language variations in second language learners (Beebe and Zuengler, 1983), this later study proved that "it is not interlocutor ethnicity alone that causes linguistic variation, but a collection of attributes (of which one is ethnicity) by which interlocutors assess their relative similarity to each other... providing clear support for the similarity-attraction aspect of CAT".

On the other hand, like the inter-group distinctiveness theory argues, several studies have revealed that when second language learners feel their social identity is threatened due to patronizing behavior towards their ethnic group they are more likely to engage in divergence. In a study conducted by Zuengler (1982) amongst Spanish and Greek speakers learning English, subjects were asked both ethnically threatening and neutral questions by a native English speaker. Those subjects that answered the ethnic-threatening question in a more personal form were noted to decrease the "native English-like pronunciations of the sounds" in their answers. Similar results were obtained in a study conducted by Giles and Bourhis conducted in Wales. In this study Welshmen with strong ties to their nation and their language who were learning Welsh were asked questions about methods of second language acquisition. In this study the questions were asked by an English speaker with an RP-sounding accent "...who at one point arrogantly challenged their reasons for what he called "... a dying language which had a dismal future." In response to this question, which greatly threatened their identity and intergroup distinctiveness, the informants diverged considerably by strengthening their Welsh accents and using Welsh.

=== Native language speakers ===
Native language speakers frequently engage in "foreign talk" (FT) when interacting with second language learners. In this type of talk native speakers adopt features such as "slower speech rates, shorter and simpler sentence, more question and question tags, greater pronunciation articulation" amongst others. This is done to increase efficiency, especially when the native speakers perceive the non-native speakers as less competent communicators, or (as the similarity-attraction theory predicts) to increase attraction. Foreign talk often contains features that mirror the mistakes made by non-native speakers in order to make speech more similar, and hence "NS may include ungrammatical features in their FT". As predicted by the inter-group distinctiveness theory, native speakers might also choose to refrain from engaging in FT or might use divergence, whenever they wish to maintain group distinctiveness, either because they have a lower perception of the other group, they feel threatened by them, or they wish to display ethnocentricity.

== Immigrants ==
Immigrants tend to converge according to what they perceive to be the prototypical behaviors of their new group, or according to the norms that they infer make part of their new environment. Meanwhile, their new communities "also may hold norms, about how immigrants do and/or should use the majority language" and "convergence that is perceived by members of the host community as inappropriate to the speaker's status, the relationship, or the norms of the situation, may be labelled as ingratiating, condescending or gauche". This might lead to a negative appraisal of the immigrant speaker. For this reasons, Gallois and Callan (1991) suggest that it is important to teach immigrants about the norms that govern convergence in each community. Although other personal motives govern immigrant's linguistic choices later on, their expectations and the situational norms that they are able to perceive are what guide their linguistic choices when they are new to a culture.

== Family communication dynamics and sexual identity ==
A research paper uses the basis of the communication accommodation theory along with intergroup communication and relational satisfaction to explain the perception of a family towards homosexuality and how family communication dynamics are impacted when one of the family member has a different sexual identity. The study was conducted to understand how to parent such a child and the consequences of disclosure on the communication in the family. Sexual identity can be a challenging discussion for a family and revealing one's identity led to topic avoidance under intergroup anxiety and the relational satisfaction was negatively viewed. Such a constrained communication made the individuals feel that their relationship with the family member was less fulfilling and eventually less satisfying.

== New media ==
As communication accommodation theory explains "the cognitions and motivations that underlie interactants' communication" with context and identity salience, it is feasible to apply it to new media related settings. Early studies have investigated possible accommodative tendencies of librarians when faced with cyberlanguage use by the patron through instant messaging technology. Since use of cyberlanguage in VRS (virtual reference services) conversations has been suggested as one possible way to strengthen patron relations, patrons who are satisfied with their interaction with a librarian who use cyberlanguage may be more willing to return. However, the result suggests that patron's use of cyberlanguage has no influence on a librarian's use of cyberlanguage and surprisingly convergence doesn't happen. Nevertheless, accommodation of communication styles do happen in other computer-mediated communication circumstances. In group brainstorming conversations, Chinese participants are likely to become as responsive as Americans when working in mixed-culture groups and more talkative when using lean medium. The use of new media provides users an opportunity to more quickly provide or gather information without new or additional disruption.

Online media allow informal communication, which shares the complex features of natural communication. Online communication often leaves a written trail, which allows the gathering and analysis of large amounts of data. This has provided evidence for communication accommodation in online communities. An analysis of over 200 million Twitter messages from 189,000 users showed that users significantly adapted their language depending on the group membership of their interlocutors. To date, this is arguably the strongest quantitative evidence for communication accommodation.

== New Applications of CAT ==
A study conducted by Tamburrini, Cinnirella, Jansen, and Bryden, Twitter (currently X) users were found to change their language or word usage when conversing with different partners on the app. Another study examined emoticon use in internet chat rooms. Researchers discovered that women use more emoticons when it comes to texting. When flirting with women, the men reciprocate their partner's use of emoticons. Another study regarding social media found that brands that interact and accommodate users online received positive assessments from recipients. The same can be seen when politicians converge and accommodate users on social media through online interactions. This can be seen through commenting, using similar online diction and syntax, as well as making posts that follow the trends. Divergence can occur through digital messaging as well. A study done by Christopherson discovered that when receiving requests from library constituents, librarians were more apt to use professional language in their responses compared to the causal dialogue of the sender.

== Case studies ==
=== Police officers ===
Giles has studied the actions and attitudes in the public's interaction with police officers using accommodation theory. Relational and identity aspects of this theory help to illustrate the interaction patterns that exist between the public and the police in the various situations in which these interaction take place. This study examined both the accommodation patterns of the officers and the public with whom they were dealing.

In this case study, officers had to find a stable balance between accommodating (displaying care, empathy, respect etc.) and keeping a firm stance of authority. Studies show that the public believes police officers, overall, should work on being more community-oriented and accommodating to all of its citizens, not only to reduce tension, anxiety, and stress, but to build trust and satisfaction between both parties. There are current and upcoming community-based police programs give citizens a more "informal", "down to earth" view of their commanding officers. However, even with these accommodations, the study suggested it was necessary for there to remain an understanding of the higher power, so that in the case in life-threatening situations, officers can continue to actively and effectively uphold society.

=== Pharmacists ===
From November 2015 to April 2016, a study was conducted to observe the communication between pharmacists and patients during medication counseling sessions. "Twelve pharmacists engaged four patients each for a total of 48 medication counselling interactions that took place". During each session, the pharmacists were recorded by one of the main researchers, another pharmacist with no ties to the other pharmacists. In each recording, the main researcher (referred to as BC) specifically searched for five strategies of CAT: approximation, interpretability, discourse management, emotional expression and interpersonal control.

- "Approximation concerns how individuals adjust their speech patterns". Speech in approximation can converge or diverge from the patient, but is appropriately applied with convergence
- "Interpretability strategies focus on each speaker's conversational competence". This means that the speaker communicates in a way to ensure the speaker understands the content of the message.
- "Discourse management strategies involve conversation processes to promote conversation between interactants". This involves using nonverbal or verbal cues to signal a person to speak or change the subject accordingly.
- Emotional expression demonstrates "empathy and reassurance".
- "Interpersonal control focuses on the roles and power relations between speakers". This strategy of CAT establishes common ground between the speakers in a form of equality.

Upon conclusion of this study, it was shown that most of the pharmacists used the five CAT strategies during their social exchanges with the patients; however, the presentations of discourse varied by pharmacist.

=== Tunisian Arabic speakers ===
In Sonia S'hiri's "Speak Arabic please!: Tunisian Arabic Speakers' Linguistic Accommodation to Middle Easterners", she describes how speakers of Tunisian Arabic converge to the "Sharqi" or "Middle Eastern Arabic" of their co-workers.

One of the many ways to divide the Arab world is between the West Maghreb and the East Sharq. Though there is no official Sharqi Arabic, the varieties usually associated with Sharqi Arabic are Egyptian, Levantine, and Persian Gulf/Iraqi Arabic. Due to Egypt's dominance of the media and arts, the "Sharqi" Arabic spoken in the region has come to be perceived by Tunisians, as "lighter", more poetic and artistic, more humorous, more romantic and even more beautiful than the local [Tunisian] variety. Again, because of its dominance in the media and the arts, Arabic speakers throughout the Arab world are much more familiar with "Sharqi" varieties than they are with "Maghrebi" varieties. A common yet incorrect belief about speech interactions in the Arab speaking world is that when speakers of different varieties of the language come into contact with one another, the default language for communication is Modern Standard Arabic (Fusha).

In her study conducted in London, S'hiri examined the social reasons for Tunisian Arabs to converge linguistically to speakers of "Sharqi Arabic". The data she found also gave ample evidence to show that code-switching into pure Fusha for communication is a misconception. S'hiri recorded five Tunisian Arabic speakers (M1, M2, W1, W2, and W3) who worked at two different broadcasting companies and found that they did indeed converge linguistically to their Sharqi co-workers. They did not, however, resort solely to Fusha. S'hiri found that when interacting with speakers of "Sharqi" Arabic, her Tunisian informants used linguistic features and lexical items characteristic of the "Sharqi" variety and some English words (instead of the French words often used in Tunisian Arabic speech) in addition to switching to Fusha. S'hiri found that many of her informants were proud of both their Tunisian variety of Arabic as well as their ability converge linguistically and even posits the idea of "showing off" as a goal of linguistic convergence". Her findings lead to a paradox. Although the Tunisian Arabs abandon their own variety of the language, they do not experience a feeling of loss of identity, because the ability to code-switch, perceived as prestigious in their culture, makes part of their positive identity. Despite their inner feelings of pride for their own group, by accommodating to the Sharqi speakers the Tunisians are setting aside their ingroup identity in order to "promote their extended ethnicity as members of an Arab nation instead of just as Tunisians". In terms of accommodation theory, Tunisians in London can be seen as the "ingroup" trying to assimilate to the "outgroup".

When her informants were asked why they had switched to the "Sharqi" variety, they all agreed it was psychologically motivating, because it allowed them to get closer to their interlocutors. M1 added that this allowed him to convey friendliness to his interlocutors, to reduce differences and avoid rejection. Informant W2 "found that using TA [Tunisian Arabic] is an obstacle to getting closer to people. She felt excluded especially at the beginning since Sharqis seemed to avoid her because they believed she would be difficult to understand". W2 also "claims that the level of readiness of Sharqis to understand her determines whether she uses TA with them or not. She wants to avoid ridicule".

== See also ==
- Bibliography of code-switching
- Code switching
- Creolization
- Dialect levelling
