= Shana Poplack =

American linguist, variation theory specialist

Shana Poplack CM FRSC
- Occupations: Linguist, University Professor

Shana Poplack, CM FRSC is a Distinguished University Professor in the linguistics department of the University of Ottawa and three-time holder of the Canada Research Chair (Tier I) in Linguistics. She is a leading proponent of variation theory, the approach to language science pioneered by William Labov. She has extended the methodology and theory of this field into bilingual speech patterns, the prescription-praxis dialectic in the co-evolution of standard and non-standard languages, and the comparative reconstruction of ancestral speech varieties, including African American Vernacular English. She founded and directs the University of Ottawa Sociolinguistics Laboratory.

== Biography ==
Born in Detroit, Michigan, and raised in New York City, she studied at Queens College and New York University, then lived in Paris for several years, studying with André Martinet at the Sorbonne before moving to the University of Pennsylvania, where she earned her PhD (1979) under William Labov's supervision. She joined the University of Ottawa in 1981.

== Work ==
Poplack's work privileges the use of large-scale digitized databases of unreflecting, vernacular speech and variable rule statistical methodology. Much of her research has involved the empirical testing of popular opinions on language, particularly as pertains to received wisdom surrounding language 'quality' or 'purity'.

=== Language contact ===
Poplack's many studies on language contact (examining multiple language pairs) have demonstrated that borrowing has no lasting structural effects on a recipient language and that many changes attributed to language contact can be alternately explained by internal language change.

During three years as a researcher at the Centro de Estudios Puertorriqueños, City University of New York, her studies of code-switching among Puerto Ricans in New York initiated her characterization of universal patterns of intrasentential language mixing and demonstrated that fluent code-mixing is a bilingual skill rather than a defect. Over three decades, she made numerous contributions to the understanding of bilingual syntax in social context, many involving typologically contrasting language pairs. Recent projects (2008) focus on the question of contact-induced change in English where it is a minority language (e.g. among Quebec anglophones).

=== Standard French ===
Much of Poplack's recent work investigates the question of whether the grammatical prescriptions of Standard French are stable, invariant, and consistent.

=== Corpora ===
In 1981, Poplack moved to the University of Ottawa, where she assembled, transcribed, and concordanced a mega-corpus of informal conversations among French speakers in the Canadian national capital region, providing her and many other researchers with a research resource on contemporary vernacular French.

=== Historical and comparative studies ===
Poplack's analyses of vernacular varieties of New World Spanish, Canadian French and English, and Brazilian Portuguese are characterized by skepticism towards standard explanations of variation and change based on language simplification or external influences, in favour of historical and comparative studies of internal evolution.

=== Diasporic English ===
Poplack's work on the origins of African American Vernacular is based on evidence from elderly descendants of American slaves recorded during fieldwork in isolated communities in the Samaná Peninsula, Dominican Republic (Samana English) and in Nova Scotia. This showed widespread retention of syntactic and morphological features (including the entire tense and aspect system) from earlier British and colonial English, contrary to previous theories attributing such features to a widespread early American creole.

Current projects (2008) focus on contact-induced change in English as a minority language and the role of the school in impeding linguistic change.

== Awards and honours ==
Shana Poplack was elected a Fellow of the Royal Society of Canada in 1998 and won the Pierre Chauveau Medal in 2005. She was voted faculty professor of the year (1999), named as Distinguished University Professor (2002), and voted Researcher of the Year (2003) at the University of Ottawa. She received a Killam Research Fellowship in 2001 and the Killam Prize in 2007. She was awarded a Canada Research Chair in 2001, which was renewed in both 2007 and 2014. She has won a Fulbright visiting scholar award (1990), a Trudeau Foundation fellowship (2007), the Ontario Premier's Discovery award (2008), a Fellowship with the Linguistic Society of America (2011), the Gold Medal for Achievement in Research (2012) by the Social Sciences and Humanities Research Council of Canada, and the André-Laurendeau Acfas prize (2019). She was elected fellow of the Linguistic Society of America (2009), was named a Member of the Order of Canada in 2014, and, in 2017, was named Doctor of Letters (honoris causa) of University College Dublin.

== Publications ==
Poplack's major publications include Instant Loans, Easy Conditions: The Productivity of Bilingual Borrowing (1998), a special issue of the International Journal of Bilingualism, with Marjory Meechan, The English History of African American English (2000) and, with Sali Tagliamonte, African American English in the Diaspora (2001), and Borrowing: Loanwords in the Speech Community and in the Grammar (2018; Oxford University Press ISBN 9780190256388).
