= Howard Giles =

American linguist

Howard Giles (born December 22, 1946) is a British-American social psychologist and a Distinguished Research Professor of Communication at the Department of Communication, University of California, Santa Barbara.

He was the chair of the department from 1991 to 1998, and has been president of both the International Communication Association and the International Association for the Study of Language and Social Psychology. He is the founding co-editor of the Journal of Language and Social Psychology and the Journal of Asian Pacific Communication, and was the editor of Human Communication Research from 1992 to 1995. He has received the Spearman Award and the President's Award from the British Psychological Society, and has also received the Mark L. Knapp Award from the National Communication Association. He is known for developing communication accommodation theory, and has diverse research interests in the areas of applied intergroup communication research and theory.

Giles was born in Cardiff, Wales. He earned his B.A. in psychology from Bangor University and his Ph.D. in Social Psychology from the University of Bristol.

== Communication accommodation theory ==
Howard Giles had a CAT; communication accommodation theory. CAT explains 'convergence' and 'divergence' as concepts in which people modify their verbal and non-verbal speech styles to either get closer to (convergence), or further away from (divergence), the people with whom they are speaking.
