= Situational code-switching =

Using different languages or language varieties in different social situations

Situational code-switching is the tendency in a speech community to use different languages or language varieties in different social situations, or to switch linguistic structures in order to change an established social setting. Some languages are viewed as more suited for a particular social group, setting, or topic more so than others. Social factors like class, religion, gender, and age influence the pattern of language that is used and switched between.

== Development ==
There are three different types of code switching which include: situational, metaphorical, and unmarked discourse code-switching.

Situational and metaphorical code-switching were first described by John J. Gumperz and Jan-Petter Bloom. In the paper "Social meaning in linguistic structures", Gumperz and Bloom are the first to suggest the division between situational and metaphorical code-switching. Gumperz and Dell Hymes describe this difference between situational and metaphorical code-switching.

An important distinction is made from situational and metaphorical code-switching. Situational switching is where alternation between varieties redefines a situation, being a change in governing norms. Metaphorical switching is when alternation enriches a situation, allowing for allusion to more than one social relationship within the situation. In metaphorical code switching, the context of the conversation is undisturbed but rather the changes adhere to the social context including the roles of those involved in the conversation. Unmarked discourse code switching serves as "markers" for a change in the context of the conversation such as the topic or quoting something.

In his book Beyond Culture, anthropologist Edward T. Hall argues that face-to-face interaction within a given culture is governed by thousands of culturally and institutionally coded situational frames, each associated with a linguistically restricted means of speaking known as the Situational Dialect (SD). A SD facilitates concise communication through the reliance on high-context messages. Hall refutes the notion of a universally applicable basic form of a language, stating that "the classroom is the only place where the classroom form of the language will be found".

Hall describes situational frames as:

Compiled of situational dialects, material appurtenances, situational personalities, and behavior patterns that occur in recognized settings and are appropriate to specific situations. Some common settings and situations are: greeting, working, eating, bargaining, fighting, governing, making love, going to school, cooking and serving meals, hanging out, and the like. The situational frame is the smallest viable unit of a culture that can be analyzed, taught, transmitted, and handed down as a complete entity. Frames contain linguistic, kinesic, proxemic, temporal, social, material, personality and other components.

Hall gives an example of an SD:

The language used between pilots and the control-tower personnel is an excellent example of a very high-context SD, developed in response to the need for a language of great parsimony and low ambiguity. (...) Situational dialects of these types frequently make use of restricted codes–and remember, restricted codes are for the insider. Everything is condensed: grammar, vocabulary, intonation. All the rules that are so carefully learned in the classroom go right out the window.

In the decades since Blom & Gumperz's and Hall's work first appeared, significant advances have been made in the analysis of code-switching.

== Factors that affect code-switching ==
=== Functions ===
Situational code-switching usually occurs when information is being exchanged, replicated, emphasized or the speaker wants an intended reaction. Situational code-switching has a wide set of functions whether it is to clarify, elaborate, bring focus to a subject or switch topics overall. It can also be used when something is being quoted in its original language, the speaker wants to address a specific individual, directly address or bring attention to a particular context within the conversation.Situational code-switching relies on adapting to the speakers within a conversation in order to accentuate, explain or change the context.

=== Psycholinguistic aspects ===
Code switching frequently occurs due to the psycholinguistic state of the speaker's ability or inability to select words from their mental vocabulary. Language in the bilingual brain is not completely separate, which is why code switching can and does occur. Code switching occurs due to the mechanisms responsible for processing, decoding, storage, retrieval, and production of linguistic material.

There are four main types of factors involved in the process of the selection of a language: (1) deselection of the undesired language, (2) the effect of proficiency, (3) the factors that trigger a switch and (4) the monitoring capacity which allows the selected language to be maintained. This process is largely sub-conscious as speakers are not very aware of their code-switching behavior.

=== Social aspects ===
Depending on the situation, speakers use code switching which convey aspects of their identity. The motivation to code switch relies on three different types of factors which contribute to the form of code-switching in a particular situation. The three sets of factors are: (1) Factors independent of the speaker and the situation in which the switch is used. (2) Factors attaching to the speaker, as individuals and as members of a variety of sub-groups. For example, their competence in each language, their social networks, their attitudes and ideologies, and their self-perception and perception of others. (3) Factors within the conversation where code-switching takes place. Code switching provides speakers with additional tools and ways to structure their dialogue beyond what is available to monolinguals.

A notable example of code-switching that has dialect-specific connotations, or in diglossia, occurs in the Arabic language, which embodies multiple variations that are used either predominantly in speaking in personal or informal settings, such as one's home dialect in the Arab League, predominantly in writing or reading strictly formal literature, such as Classical Arabic, and a standardized version of both that can be spoken and written in professional or high educational settings (such as in university), Modern Standard Arabic.

Many countries in the Arab League have a long history in the effects of code-switching not only between different forms of Arabic, but between Arabic and another language as well. For instance, in Egypt, as well as in many other Arab countries, proficiency in a language besides Arabic is only achievable through private, formalized education that is often only affordable to the wealthy upper class. Code-switching between their native dialect to English or another foreign language is thus an index of their socioeconomic status and educational background.

Within the history of the Arab world, Arab nationalism has played a large part on the perception of code-switching in certain Arabic-speaking communities; switching from a foreign, particularly European, language was historically frowned upon in society, as it was a linguistic symbol of the occupying country's influence over a nation and so, during the wave of Arab nationalism, there was a social preference to only speak Arabic and promote 'Arab ideals'.

== Examples ==
An example of situational code-switching can be seen in this telephone conversation between two friends. The speaker is talking about recent political events, and the language she uses is Standard Italian. When she decides to change topics, though, she marks this change by switching to Sicilian. (Standard Italian is shown in ordinary type. Sicilian is in italics.)

Io mai l'ho vista una campagna elettorale così. Neppure nel quarantotto, che era il dopoguerra, che c'erano... che c'erano proprio umori tremendi. Mai si era verificato. N'autra cosa t'ai'a cchièdirti, Giovanna.

(I've never seen an electoral campaign like this. Not even in 1948, in the post-war period, when there were... when there were tremendous emotions. It never happened. I've got something else to ask you, Giovanna.)

A change in topic is an example of a changed situation that may be marked by code-switching. The speaker in this example switches from Standard Italian to the local language, marking the new situation with a different language.

In the medical field situational code-switching occurs when patients do not speak the standard language spoken within a hospital and the staff then need to code switch in order to be able to communicate with them.

Physicians and nurses working on the general medicine hospital floor of UCSF Moffitt-Long Hospital will code switch from English to Spanish when needing to present information to patients, obtain information, conduct difficult conversations, and educate patients.

At Riverview Hospital situational code-switching occurred with an interpreter rather than the physician. In this situation the interpreter is in a position of co-interviewer where the interpreter speaks with the patient in order to find out their concerns and then relay them to the physician when they arrived. "[To Patient] Anda, a ver que dice el doctor; Well, let's see what the doctor says.[To Physician] Doctor, I was looking for something to put over there because he wants to show you his...foot." Here the interpreter code-switches in order to be able to effectively communicate to the doctor the concerns of the patient, foot pains.

A four-year-old child named Benjamin was an English-French bilingual speaker. He constantly code switched around his parents, since his father only spoke English and his mother only spoke French to him (though she was bilingual).

Growing up in a prominent English-speaking community, Benjamin preferred English over French, hence him speaking English when talking about everyday activities. However, when conversing about school related topics at home he spoke mostly in French due to his mother and tutors continually speaking to him in French. "Benjamin: Hi! Kevin: En français, oui? In French, yes?."

== See also ==
- Non-convergent discourse, where each speaker communicates in their own language, but everyone understands each other
