= Ben Rampton =

British linguist (born 1953)

- Born: Michael Benjamin Helter Rampton; 31 May 1953 (age 73)
- Education: University of York; University of London
- Occupation: Linguist

Michael Benjamin Helter Rampton (born 31 May 1953) is a British linguist currently serving as Professor of Applied and Socio Linguistics at King's College London.

== Career ==
Rampton completed a bachelor's degree at the University of York in 1976, and obtained a doctorate at the University of London in 1987. He was elected a fellow of the Academy of Social Sciences and the Royal Anthropological Institute.

== Books ==
- Rampton, Ben (1995). Crossing: Language and Ethnicity Among Adolescents. Longman. ISBN 978-0-582-21791-1.
- Harris, Roxy; Rampton, Ben, eds. (2003). The Language, Ethnicity and Race Reader. Routledge. ISBN 978-0-415-27601-6.
- Rampton, Ben (2006). Language in late modernity: interaction in an urban school. Cambridge University Press. ISBN 978-0-521-81263-4.
