= Peter Auer =

- Born: 1954 (age 71–72); Regensburg, West Germany
- Education: University of Konstanz (PhD, 1983; Habilitation, 1988)
- Known for: Research on code-switching, multilingualism, dialectology
- Awards: Baden-Württemberg State Research Prize (2011)
- Scientific career
- Fields: Linguistics; Sociolinguistics; Dialectology
- Workplaces: University of Freiburg (1998–present); University of Hamburg (1989–1998); University of Konstanz (1980–1989)
- Thesis: Zweisprachige Konversationen. Code-Switching und Transfer bei italienischen Migrantenkindern in Konstanz (1983)

Peter Auer (born 1954) is a German linguist and professor emeritus of Germanic linguistics at the University of Freiburg. He is known for his work in sociolinguistics, code-switching, multilingualism, dialectology, and conversation analysis.

== Early life and education ==
Auer was born in 1954 in Regensburg, West Germany. He studied general linguistics, german linguistics, sociology, and psychology at the University of Cologne, the University of Konstanz, and the University of Manchester.

He completed his doctoral dissertation at the University of Konstanz in 1983, titled Zweisprachige Konversationen: Code-Switching und Transfer bei italienischen Migrantenkindern in Konstanz (Bilingual Conversations: Code-Switching and Transfer among Italian Migrant Children in Constance). He subsequently completed his habilitation at the same institution in 1988.

== Career ==
From 1980 to 1989, Auer worked as a researcher and assistant professor in the Department of Linguistics at the University of Konstanz. In 1989, he became a Heisenberg Scholar and later accepted a position as professor of German linguistics at the University of Hamburg.

In 1998, Auer joined the University of Freiburg as a full professor of Germanic philology, where he remained until his retirement. He declined professorships at LMU Munich, the University of Mainz, and Bangor University.

From 2007 to 2013, Auer served as co-director of the Freiburg Institute for Advanced Studies (FRIAS) School of Language and Literature.

Auer was elected referee of the German Research Foundation (DFG) for General Linguistics (2000–2008). He was also co-director of the European Science Foundation Network on Convergence and Divergence of Dialects in a Changing Europe and a member of editorial boards of various national and international academic journals.

== Research ==
Auer's research spans multiple areas of linguistics, with particular focus on sociolinguistics, bilingualism, and dialectology. According to Google Scholar, his work has been cited over 74,000 times as of 2026.

His research on code-switching in conversation has been influential in understanding how bilingual speakers alternate between languages in social interaction. He has conducted extensive work on German dialects, particularly Alemannic varieties in southwestern Germany, examining how regional language varieties change through societal development. His studies on conversation have contributed to discourse research, including work on turn-taking, prosody, and the temporal organization of talk. He has also done research on mixed languages and fused varieties emerging in multilingual contact situations. He has done pioneering work analyzing the psychological and interactional processes involved in real-time language production, studying online syntax.

Auer has served as principal investigator on 15 externally-funded research projects supported by organizations including the German Research Foundation, Volkswagen Foundation, and Fritz Thyssen Foundation.

== Awards and honors ==
In 2011, Auer received the Baden-Württemberg State Research Prize for his work on regional language varieties. The prize recognized his innovative approaches combining traditional dialectology with modern theories of variational dynamics, human migration, language contact, stereotype research, globalization, and urbanization.

== Selected publications ==
Auer has authored six monographs, edited thirteen books and journal issues, and written approximately 100 research articles.

=== Books ===
- Auer, Peter (1984). Bilingual Conversation. John Benjamins. ISBN 978-90-272-2541-2.
- Auer, Peter; di Luzio, Aldo (1992). The Contextualization of Language. John Benjamins. ISBN 978-90-272-5034-6.
- Auer, Peter (1998). Code-Switching in Conversation: Language, Interaction and Identity. Routledge. ISBN 978-1-134-60673-3.
- Auer, Peter; Couper-Kuhlen, Elizabeth; Muller, Frank (1999). Language in Time: The Rhythm and Tempo of Spoken Interaction. Oxford University Press. ISBN 978-0-19-535516-1.
- Auer, Peter (2007). Style and Social Identities: Alternative Approaches to Linguistic Heterogeneity. Walter de Gruyter. ISBN 978-3-11-019081-6.
- Auer, Peter; Pfänder, Stefan (2011). Constructions: Emerging and Emergent. Walter de Gruyter. ISBN 978-3-11-022908-0.
