= Ana Celia Zentella =

American linguist (born 1940)

- Born: 1939 or 1940 (age 86–87); Bronx, New York City, New York, U.S.
- Occupation: Professor Emerita of Ethnic Studies
- Awards: British Association for Applied Linguistics Book Prize; Book Award of the Association Latina and Latino Anthropologists of the American Anthropology Association; Inducted into the American Academy of Arts and Sciences, 2022 Distinguished Career Award, Assn of Latina/o Anthrologists, 2023

Academic background
- Education: Ph.D., Educational Linguistics, University of Pennsylvania M.A., Pennsylvania State University, Romance Languages and Literatures B.A., Hunter College (Bronx), Spanish

Academic work
- Institutions: Hunter College; University of California San Diego

Ana Celia Zentella (born 1940) is an American linguist known for her "anthro-political" approach to linguistic research and expertise on multilingualism, linguistic diversity, and language intolerance, especially in relation to U.S. Latino languages and communities. She is Professor Emerita of Ethnic Studies at the University of California, San Diego.

Her 1997 book Growing up bilingual: Puerto Rican children in New York was honored by the British Association for Applied Linguistics and the Association of Latina and Latino Anthropologists of the American Anthropology Association. Zentella was honored as a 2005 Frank Bonilla Public Intellectual of the Year by the Latino Studies section of the Latin American Studies Association. She was also recognized by the Society for Linguistic Anthropology for her Public Outreach & Community Service.

In 1996, Manhattan Borough President Ruth Messinger declared October 30 as "Doctor Ana Celia Zentella Day" in honor of "her leading role in building appreciation for language diversity and respect for language rights".

== Biography ==
Zentella was born March 7, 1940 in the South Bronx, New York City to a Puerto Rican mother and a Mexican father. Growing up in the 1950s, she was exposed not only to multiple languages but also to multiple varieties of Spanish in the community.

She attended Hunter College, CUNY in the Bronx as an undergraduate, obtaining a B.A. degree in Spanish. She went on to complete a M.A. in Romance Languages and Literatures at Pennsylvania State University, and obtained a PhD in Educational Linguistics in 1981 at the University of Pennsylvania, with a dissertation titled "Hablamos los dos. We speak both": Growing up bilingual in el barrio.

Zentella was Professor of Black and Puerto Rican Studies (now the Department of Africana/Puerto Rican/Latino Studies) at Hunter College, CUNY from 1970 to 2001. She was Chair of the Language and Social Justice Committee of the American Anthropology Association from 2010 to 2012. At the time of her retirement, she was Professor of Ethnic Studies at University of California, San Diego.

== Research ==
Zentella's research adopts a political perspective on linguistic anthropology that "places language in its social context and acknowledges that there is no language without power. In other words, issues of power are deeply embedded in all aspects of language." Much of her research focuses on U.S. varieties of Spanish, English, and Spanglish, practices of language socialization in Latinx families, and the societal impact of “English-only" laws. She notes that when English and Spanish speakers interact, it can be difficult to decide which language to speak. Sometimes when non-Spanish speakers use the few Spanish words in their vocabularies to communicate, they come across as genuine and considerate, while at other times their use of phrases such as “no problemo” and “comprendee” comes off as offensive or mocking of Spanish speakers.

She has explored how specific linguistic features may shift in their distribution when different groups of speakers converge. As an example, she and her colleagues have explored the overt use of pronouns as a marker of the linguistic identities of different groups of Spanish-speakers residing in New York City. In another study, she recorded the language practices of high school and college students who live in Tijuana, Mexico, but travel to San Diego, California on a daily basis to attend school. Through interviews with these students, known as transfronterizos, she documented the conflicts they experience around language use and identity, and stigma associated with their use of Spanglish.

== Books ==
- Otheguy, R., & Zentella, A. C. (2012). Spanish in New York: Language contact, dialectal leveling, and structural continuity. Oxford University Press.
- Zentella, A. C. (1997). Growing up bilingual: Puerto Rican children in New York. Blackwell Publishers.
- Zentella, A. C. (Ed.). (2005). Building on strength: Language and literacy in Latino families and communities. Teachers College Press.
- Zentella, A. C. (Ed.) (2009). Multilingual San Diego: Portraits of language loss and revitalization. University Readers.

== Awards and honors ==
- Inducted into American Academy of Arts & Sciences (2022)
- Association of Latina/o and Latinx Anthropologists: Distinguished Career Award (2023)

=== National Honors Societies and Student Fellowships ===
- Phi Beta Kappa (1960)
- Sigma Delta Pi (Spanish, 1960)
- Kappa Delta Pi (Education, 1960)
- NYS Regents Fellowship, Class of 1878 Fellowship (1960)
- Pennsylvania State University Teaching Assistantship (Romance Langs)
- University of Kansas Graduate Fellowship (Linguistics)
- Linguistic Society of America Summer Institute Fellowship
- University of Pennsylvania Graduate Fellowship

=== Research Fellowships ===
- School of American Research NEH Fellow, Santa Fe, NM, 1998–99
- Stanford University Humanities Center Fellow, 1991-1992
- Rockefeller Foundation Bellagio Residency, Italy, summer 1991
