= Carol Myers-Scotton =

American linguist (1934–2026)

- Born: February 19, 1934
- Died: October 23, 2026 (aged 92)

Academic background
- Education: BA, Grinnell College; MA & PhD, UW–Madison
- Thesis: Some Semantic and Syntactic; Aspects of Swahili Extended; Verb Forms (1967)

Academic work
- Institutions: University of South Carolina; Michigan State University

Carol Myers-Scotton (February 19, 1934 – October 23, 2026) was an American linguist. She was a Distinguished Professor emerita in the Linguistics Program and Department of English at the University of South Carolina.

== Education ==
Myers-Scotton received her Bachelor of Arts from Grinnell College in 1955, and her Master of Arts in English in 1961 and Doctor of Philosophy in linguistics in 1967, both from the University of Wisconsin–Madison.

== Career ==
Myers-Scotton served on the faculty of Michigan State University in East Lansing from 1976 to 1986. She then took up a position at the University of South Carolina, where she was Carolina Distinguished Professor in the Linguistics Program and Department of English. After retiring in 2003, she returned to Michigan, where she was an adjunct professor in the Department of Linguistics and Languages at Michigan State University (MSU) and also a visiting scholar at the MSU African Studies Center.

== Publications and research ==
Myers-Scotton authored or coauthored over 100 articles and book chapters in linguistics, primarily in the areas of contact linguistics, sociopragmatics, bilingualism and African linguistics. Much of her research focused on explaining the social and cognitive aspects of code-switching and bilingualism. In addition to her numerous journal articles, she also published six books, including Contact Linguistics (2002) and Multiple Voices (2006).

== Death ==
Myers-Scotton died on October 23, 2026, at the age of 92.

== Honors ==
Myers-Scotton received many grants and honors, including a 1983 Fulbright Program grant to study language use patterns in Kenya and Zimbabwe, a 1994–1997 National Science Foundation grant to study grammatical constraints on code switching (with co-PI Jan Jake), and a 2004–2005 National Science Foundation grant to test a hypothesis about the grammatical aspects of the abruptness of language shift. Specifically, the study dealt with Xhosa-English bilinguals in Gauteng Province in South Africa around Pretoria and Johannesburg.
