= Cyphomandra =

Extinct genus of flowering plants

Tamarillo (S. betaceum) with unripe fruit

Cyphomandra was a formerly accepted genus in the plant family Solanaceae (the nightshades and relative). It used to contain about 35 species native to the Americas from Mexico southwards to Northern Argentina.

Recent authors have treated Cyphomandra as a clade within the genus Solanum rather than as a separate genus, uniting the members of the old genus with some other Solanum. This lineage is one among a group related to part of the traditional subgenus Leptostemonum. Thus, if it is preferred to retain the taxon, Cyphomandra is probably best considered a section in Solanum subgenus Leptostemonum.

Most grow as shrubs or small trees 2 or 3 metres in height. The best known species is the widely cultivated Tamarillo or tree tomato, but a number of the others are also cultivated as garden plants because of their attractive flowers or fruits. Several other species (e.g. S. cajanumense, S. circinatum, S. sibundoyense) also have fruits that are edible when ripe, and yet others are used as dyestuffs or in folk medicine where they are native.

== Species ==
Species contained in the Cyphomandra clade, with their former specific epithets cited if they have significantly changed when moving to Solanum, are:

- Solanum allophyllum (Miers) Standl.
- Solanum amotapense Svenson (= Cyphomandra villosa Steyerm.)
- Solanum betaceum – Tamarillo (= Cyphomandra crassicaulis(?), C. crassifolia (Ortega) J.F.Macbr., C. crassifolia (Ortega) Kuntze, C. procera Wawra)
- Solanum cacosmum Bohs (Cyphomandra foetida Bohs)
- Solanum cajanumense (= Cyphomandra casana A.Child)
- Solanum calidum Bohs (= Cyphomandra pilosa Bohs)
- Solanum circinatum Bohs (= Cyphomandra artocarpophylla H.J.P.Winkl., C. costaricencis Donn.Sm., C. dendroidea Pittier, C. dolichorhachis Bitter, C. hartwegii (Miers) Walp., C. hartwegii ssp. ramosa Bohs, C. heterophylla Donn.Sm., C. holtonii Hochr., C. kalbreyeri Bitter, C. mollicella Standl., C. naranjilla Pittier, C. splendens Dunal in DC.)
- Solanum confusum C.V.Morton (= Cyphomandra adelpha (C.V.Morton) A.Child)
- Solanum corymbiflorum (Sendtn.) Bohs (= Cyphomandra kleinii L.B.Sm. & Downs, C. macrophylla L.B.Sm. & Downs, C. mortoniana L.B.Sm. & Down, C. patrum L.B.Sm. & Downs)
- Solanum cylindricum Vell. (= Cyphomandra elliptica (Vell.) Sendtn. in Mart., C. subhastata (L.B.Sm. & Downs) A.Child)
- Solanum diploconos (Mart.) Bohs (= Cyphomandra floribunda (Miers) Dunal in DC., C. fragrans (Hook.) Sendtn. in Mart., C. piperoides Dunal in DC.)
- Solanum diversifolium Dunal (= Cyphomandra campanulata Moritz ex Steyerm. & Huber, C. caracasana (Roem. & Schult.) Sendtn., C. caudata Standl., C. chlorantha Rusby, C. meridensis Steyerm. & Rojas)
- Solanum endopogon (Bitter) Bohs
- Solanum exiguum (= Cyphomandra benensis Britton)
- Solanum fallax (= Cyphomandra betacea var. velutina Dunal in DC., C. hypomalaca Bitter)
- Solanum fortunense (= Cyphomandra dolichocarpa Bitter)
- Solanum fusiforme L.B.Sm. & Downs
- Solanum glaucophyllum Desf.
- Solanum hibernum Bohs
- Solanum hutchisonii (J.F.Macbr.) Bohs
- Solanum latiflorum (= Cyphomandra calycina Sendtn., C. calycina var. rufescens Dunal in DC.)
- Solanum luridifuscescens Bitter (= Cyphomandra glaberrima Dusén, C. velutina Sendtn. in Mart.)
- Solanum luteoalbum
- Solanum mapiriense Bitter (= Cyphomandra phytolaccoides (Rusby) A.Child)
- Solanum maranguapense Bitter
- Solanum matadori Smith & Downs
- Solanum maternum Bohs
- Solanum melissarum (= Cyphomandra capsicoides (Miers) Walp., C. ciliata (Miers) Walp., C. divaricata (Mart.) Sendtn., C. divaricata var. flexipes Sendtn. in Mart., C. divaricata var. herbacea Sendtn. in Mart., C. laxiflora Dunal in DC., C. oxyphylla Dunal in DC.)
- Solanum morellifolium Bohs
- Solanum obliquum Ruiz & Pav. (= Cyphomandra brachypodia Sendtn., C. coriacea (Miers) Walp., C. obliqua (Ruiz & Pav.) Sendtn., C. ulei Bitter)
- Solanum occultum Bohs (= Cyphomandra stellata Bohs)
- Solanum ovum-fringillae
- Solanum oxyphyllum C.V.Morton (= Cyphomandra fragilis Bohs)
- Solanum paralum (= Cyphomandra heterophylla Taub.)
- Solanum pelagicum Bohs (= Cyphomandra cornigera Dunal in DC., C. maritima L.B.Sm. & Downs)
- Solanum pendulum Ruiz & Pav. (= Cyphomandra arborea H.J.P.Winkl., C. subcordata Rusby)
- Solanum pinetorum (= Cyphomandra angustifolia L.B.Sm. & Downs, C. hispida L.B.Sm. & Downs)
- Solanum premnifolium (Miers) Bohs
- Solanum proteanthum Bohs (= Cyphomandra oblongifolia Bohs)
- Solanum rojasianum (Standl. & Steyerm.) Bohs
- Solanum roseum (= Cyphomandra acuminata Rusby)
- Solanum sciadostylis (Sendtn.) Bohs (= Cyphomandra reitzii L.B.Sm. & Downs)
- Solanum sibundoyense
- Solanum stuckertii Bitter
- Solanum sycocarpum (= Cyphomandra lobata Sendtn. in Mart.)
- Solanum tegore Aubl. (= Cyphomandra tejore Sendtn. ex Walp.)
- Solanum tenuisetosum (Bitter) Bohs
- Solanum tobagense (= Cyphomandra bolivarensis Steyerm.)
- Solanum unilobum (Rusby) Bohs

=== Formerly placed here ===
Species formerly in the genus Cyphomandra which are not members of the Cyphomandra clade are:

- Solanum abutiloides (Griseb.) Bitter & Lillo
