= Spanglish =

Hybrid language of Spanish and English

- Espanglish, Ingléspañol, Inglañol, Espanglés
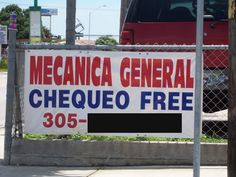
- A sign offering free consultation from a mechanic, taken in Miami, Florida.
- Language family: Mixed Spanish–English (Indo-European)
- Writing system: Latin

Language codes
- ISO 639-3: –
- IETF: en-spanglis; es-spanglis

Spanglish (a blend of the words "Spanish" and "English") is any language variety (such as a contact dialect, hybrid language, pidgin, or creole language) that results from conversationally combining Spanish and English. The term is mostly used in the United States and in Puerto Rico. It refers to a blend of the words and grammar of Spanish and English. More narrowly, Spanglish can specifically mean a variety of Spanish with heavy use of English loanwords.

Since Spanglish may arise independently in different regions with varying degrees of bilingualism, it reflects the locally spoken varieties of English and Spanish. Different forms of Spanglish are not necessarily mutually intelligible.

The term Spanglish was first recorded in 1933. It corresponds to the Spanish terms Espanglish (from Español + English, introduced by the Puerto Rican poet Salvador Tió in the late 1940s), Ingléspañol (from Inglés + Español), and Inglañol (Inglés + Español).

== Definitions ==
There is no single, universal definition of Spanglish. The term Spanglish has been used in reference to the following phenomena, all of which are distinct from each other:

- The use of integrated English loanwords in Spanish
- Nonassimilated Anglicisms (i.e., with English phonetics) in Spanish
- Calques and loan translations from English
- Code-switching, particularly intra-sentential switches (i.e., within the same clause)
- Grammar mistakes in Spanish found among transitional bilingual speakers
- Second-language Spanish, including poor translations
- The appearance of English words in Spanish monolingual speakers
- Mock Spanish

== History and distribution ==
In the late 1940s, the Puerto Rican journalist, poet, and essayist Salvador Tió coined the terms Espanglish for Spanish spoken with some English terms and the less commonly used Inglañol for English spoken with some Spanish terms.

After Puerto Rico became a United States territory in 1898, Spanglish became progressively more common there as the United States Army and the early colonial administration tried to impose the English language on island residents, as well as the adjustment of language upon the move of New Yorricans (New York Puerto Ricans) back to the island. Between 1902 and 1948, the main language of instruction in public schools (used for all subjects except for Spanish class) was English. Currently, Puerto Rico is nearly unique in having both English and Spanish as its official languages (see also New Mexico).

Consequently, many American English words are now found in the Puerto Rican Spanish vocabulary. Spanglish may also be known by different regional names. Spanglish does not have one unified dialect—specifically, the varieties of Spanglish spoken in New York, Florida, Texas, and California differ. Monolingual speakers of standard Spanish may have difficulty in understanding it. It is common in Panama, where the 96-year (1903–1999) U.S. control of the Panama Canal influenced much of local society, especially among the former residents of the Panama Canal Zone, the Zonians.

In informal situations, many Puerto Ricans living on the island of St. Croix speak a unique Spanglish-like combination of Puerto Rican Spanish and the local Crucian dialect of Virgin Islands Creole English, which is very different from the Spanglish spoken elsewhere. A similar situation exists in the large Puerto Rican-descended populations of New York City and Boston.

Spanglish is spoken commonly in the modern United States. According to the Pew Research Center, the population of Hispanics grew from 35.3 million to 62.1 million between 2000 and 2020. Hispanics have become the largest minority ethnic group in the US. More than 60% are of Mexican descent. Mexican Americans form one of the fastest-growing groups, increasing from 20.9 million to 37.2 million between 2000 and 2021. Around 58% of this community chose California, especially Southern California, as their new home. Spanglish is widely used throughout the heavily Mexican-American and other Hispanic communities of Southern California. The use of Spanglish has become important to Hispanic communities throughout the United States in areas such as Miami, New York City, Texas, and California. In Miami, the Afro-Cuban community makes use of a Spanglish familiarly known as "Cubonics," a portmanteau of the words Cuban and Ebonics, a slang term for African American Vernacular English that is itself a portmanteau of Ebony and phonics."

Many Mexican-Americans (Chicanos), immigrants and bilinguals express themselves in various forms of Spanglish. For many, Spanglish serves as a basis for self-identity, but others believe that it should not exist. Use of Spanglish can be an important feature of personal and communal identity; it can also be negatively perceived by speakers of Spanish.

The expanding of Spanglish within the Mexican American experience in the United States is linked to demographic changes, media expansion and different cultural identities. Following the Immigration and Nationality Act of 1965 there was a rise of migration into the United States from Mexico. This migration allowed for bilingual communities to settle and develop their language ties that evolved greatly over the next century. This mixing became more prevalent and American society was shaped by Spanglish through this influx of mixed language.

According to the U.S Census Bureau, in 2013, close to 40% of the Hispanic/Latinx population in the United States was under the age of 21; this population reflects a young and bilingual group of Hispanics. This large population of individuals under the age of 21 contributed to the rapid formalization of Spanglish, especially for the Mexican American community of youth under 21.

With the expansion of Spanish-language media, networks such as Univision, Telemundo, and Galavision, this allowed more families to unite and share their bilingual nuances with other cultures/groups. As Hispanic populations migrated to different parts of the United States, media was always the one constant. The media was able to keep bilingual content alive and it solidified Spanglish as an important language contribution to the United States.

Other places where similar mixed codes are spoken are Gibraltar (Llanito), Belize (Kitchen Spanish), Aruba, Bonaire, and Curaçao (along with Dutch and Papiamento).

In Australasia, forms of Spanglish are used among Spanish-speaking migrants and diasporic communities. In particular, Hispanophone Australians frequently use loanwords/phrases from Australian English, in conversations that are otherwise in Spanish; examples include "el rubbish bin", "la vacuum cleaner", "el mobile", "el toilet", "vivo en un flat pequeño", "voy a correr con mis runners", and "la librería de la city es grande". Similar phenomena occur amongst native Spanish speakers in New Zealand.

== Usage ==
=== Spanglish patterns ===
Spanglish is informal, although speakers can consistently judge the grammaticality of a phrase or sentence. From a linguistic point of view, Spanglish often is mistakenly labeled many things. Spanglish is not a creole or dialect of Spanish because, though people claim they are native Spanglish speakers, Spanglish itself is not a language on its own, but speakers speak English or Spanish with a heavy influence from the other language. The definition of Spanglish has been unclearly explained by scholars and linguists, contributing to misconceptions. Spanglish is the fluid exchange of language between English and Spanish, present in the heavy influence in the words and phrases used by the speaker. Spanglish is currently considered a hybrid language practice by linguists. Some linguists refer to Spanglish as "Spanish-English code-switching", though there is some influence of borrowing, and lexical and grammatical shifts as well.

In modern times, research has progressed from viewing Spanglish as an altogether different, less educated, form of code-switching to recognizing that it is indeed the same code-switching phenomenon that occurs between bilinguals worldwide. Though code-switching can be considered a controversial issue in the discussion of Spanglish phenomena, the daily use of code-switching is highly likely for bilingual speakers.

=== Calques ===
Calques are translations of entire words or phrases from one language into another. Calques are the literal translation of English words to Spanish with the addition of a local Spanish accent. Calques represent the simplest forms of Spanglish, as they undergo no lexical or grammatical structural change. The use of calques is common throughout most languages, evident in the calques of Arabic exclamations used in Spanish.

Examples:

- "to call back" → llamar pa'trás (llamar pa' atrás, llamar para atrás) (volver a llamar, llamar de vuelta)
- "It's up to you." → Está pa'rriba de ti. (Está pa' arriba de ti, Está para arriba de ti) (Depende de ti. decide (You decide))
- "to be up to ..." → estar pa'rriba de ... (estar pa' arriba de ..., estar para arriba de ...) (depender de ... or X decida (X decides))
- "to run for governor" → correr para gobernador (presentarse para gobernador)

==== pa'trás ====
A well-known calque is pa'trás or para atrás in expressions such as llamar pa'trás 'to call back'. Here, pa'trás reflects the particle back in various English phrasal verbs. Expressions with pa'trás are found in every stable English-Spanish contact situation: the United States, including among the isolated Isleño and Sabine River communities, Gibraltar, and sporadically in Trinidad and along the Caribbean coast of Central America where the local English varieties are heavily creolized. Meanwhile, they're unattested in non-contact varieties of Spanish. Pa'trás expressions are unique as a calque of an English verbal particle, since other phrasal verbs and particles are almost never calqued into Spanish. Because of this, and because they're consistent with existing Spanish grammar, Otheguy (1993) argues they are likely a result of a conceptual, not linguistic loan. That is, the notion of "backness" has been expanded in these contact varieties.

=== Semantic extensions ===
Semantic extension or reassignment refers to a phenomenon where speakers use a word of language A (typically Spanish in this case) with the meaning of its cognate in language B (typically English), rather than its standard meaning in language A. In Spanglish this usually occurs in the case of "false friends" (similar to, but technically not the same as false cognates), where words of similar form in Spanish and English are thought to have similar meanings based on their cognate relationship.

Examples:

Spanglish	English basis and meaning	Standard Spanish	Meaning of Spanglish word in standard Spanish
actualmente	actually	en realidad, realmente, de verdad, verdaderamente, de hecho	currently
aplicación	application (written request)	solicitud, postulación	application (of paint, etc.)
bizarro	bizarre	estrambótico	valiant, dashing
carpeta	carpet	alfombra, moqueta	folder
chequear/checar	to check (verify)	comprobar, verificar	—
eventualmente	eventually	finalmente, al final, por fin	possibly
librería	library	biblioteca	bookstore
parquear	to park	estacionar, aparcar	—
realizar	to realize	darse cuenta	to carry out, to perform, to fulfill
recordar	to record	grabar	to remember
rentar	to rent	alquilar, arrendar	to yield, to produce a profit
renta	rent	alquiler, arriendo	yield, profit
sanitizador	sanitizer	desinfectante	—
sentencia	sentence (linguistics)	frase, oración	sentence (court decision)
wacha	to watch out	cuidado	—

An example of this lexical phenomenon in Spanglish is the emergence of new verbs when the productive Spanish verb-making suffix -ear is attached to an English verb. For example, the Spanish verb for "to eat lunch" (almorzar in standard Spanish) becomes lonchear (occasionally lunchear). The same process produces watchear, parquear, emailear, twittear, etc.

=== Loanwords ===
Loanwords occur in any language due to the presence of items or ideas not present in the culture before, such as modern technology. The increasing rate of technological growth requires the use of loan words from the donor language due to the lack of its definition in the lexicon of the main language. This partially deals with the "prestige" of the donor language, which either forms a dissimilar or more similar word from the loan word. The growth of modern technology can be seen in the expressions: "hacer click" (to click), "mandar un email" (to send an email), "faxear" (to fax), "textear" (to text-message), or "hackear" (to hack). Some words borrowed from the donor languages are adapted to the language, while others remain unassimilated (e. g. "sandwich", "jeans" or "laptop"). The items most associated with Spanglish refer to words assimilated into the main morphology. Immigrants are usually responsible for "Spanishizing" English words. According to The New York Times, "Spanishizing" is accomplished "by pronouncing an English word 'Spanish style' (dropping final consonants, softening others, replacing M's with N's and V's with B's), and spelled by transliterating the result using Spanish spelling conventions."

==== Examples ====
- "Aseguranza" (insurance; "seguros" is insurance in standard Spanish, aseguranza is literally "assurance" which is similar to the Prudential Insurance company's slogan, "peace of mind")
- "Biles" (bills)
- "Chorcha" (church)
- "Ganga" (gang)
- "Líder" (leader) – considered an established Anglicism
- "Lonchear/Lonchar" (to have lunch)
- "Marqueta" (market)
- "Taipear/Tipear" (to type)
- "Troca" (truck) – Widely used in most of northern Mexico as well
- ”Mitin” (meeting) – An outdoors gathering of people mostly for political purposes.
- ”Checar” (to check)
- ”Escanear” (to scan) – To digitalize (e.g. a document).
- ”Chatear” (to chat)
- “Desorden” (disorder) – incorrectly used as “disease”.
- ”Condición” (condition) – incorrectly used as “sickness”.
- "Viaje de las Estrellas" - "Star Trek"; the television shows such as "King of the Hill" and "MadTV" sometimes used standard Spanish but in an elementary manner.

=== So-insertion ===
Within the US, the English word so is often inserted into Spanish discourse. This use of so is found in conversations that otherwise take place entirely in Spanish. Its users run the gamut from Spanish-dominant immigrants to native, balanced bilinguals to English-dominant semi-speakers and second-language speakers of Spanish, and even people who reject the use of Anglicisms have been found using so in Spanish. Whether so is a simple loanword, or part of some deeper form of language mixing, is disputed. Many consider so to simply be a loanword, although borrowing short function words is quite abnormal. In stressed positions, so is usually pronounced with English phonetics, and speakers typically identify it as an English word and not an established English loan such as troca. This is unusual, since code-switched or lexically inserted words typically aren't as common and recurring as so is.

So is always used as a coordinating conjunction in Spanish. A similar word can be found in Spanish o sea. It can be used phrase-internally, or at the beginning or end of a sentence. In Spanish discourse, so is never used to mean "in order that" as it often is in English. As a sociolinguistic phenomenon, speakers who subconsciously insert so into their Spanish usually spend most of their time speaking English. This and other facts suggest that the insertion of so and similar items such as you know and I mean are the result of a kind of "metalinguistic bracketing". That is, discourse in Spanish is circumscribed by English and by a small group of English functional words. These terms can act as punctuation for Spanish dialogue within an English-dominant environment.

=== Fromlostiano ===
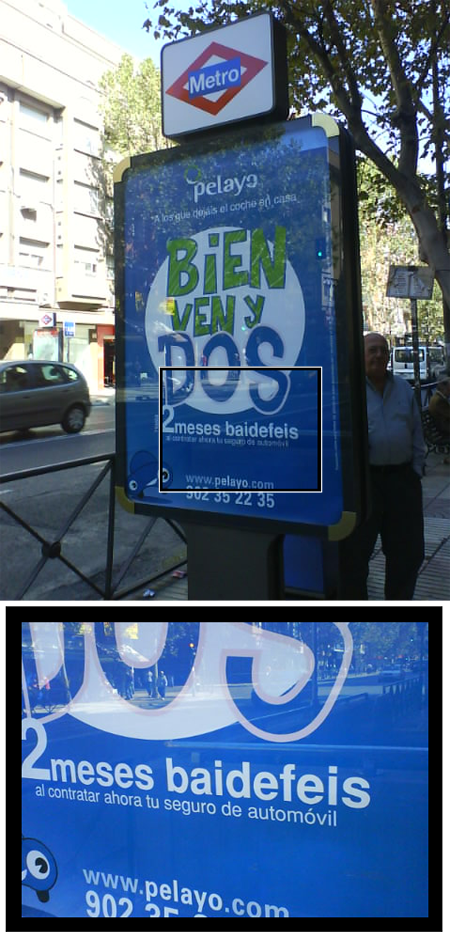
Spanish street ad in Madrid humorously showing baidefeis instead of the Spanish gratis (free). Baidefeis derives from the English "by the face"; Spanish: por la cara, "free". The adoption of English words is very common in Spain.

Fromlostiano is a type of artificial and humorous wordplay that translates Spanish idioms word-for-word into English. The name fromlostiano comes from the expression From Lost to the River, which is a word-for-word translation of de perdidos al río; an idiom that means that one is prone to choose a particularly risky action in a desperate situation (this is somewhat comparable to the English idiom in for a penny, in for a pound). The humor comes from the fact that while the expression is completely grammatical in English, it makes no sense to a native English speaker. Hence it is necessary to understand both languages to appreciate the humor.

This phenomenon was first noted in the book From Lost to the River in 1995. The book describes six types of fromlostiano:

1. Translations of Spanish idioms into English: With you bread and onion (Contigo pan y cebolla), Nobody gave you a candle in this burial (Nadie te ha dado vela en este entierro), To good hours, green sleeves (A buenas horas mangas verdes).
2. Translations of American and British celebrities' names into Spanish: Vanesa Tumbarroja (Vanessa Redgrave).
3. Translations of American and British street names into Spanish: Calle del Panadero (Baker Street).
4. Translations of Spanish street names into English: Shell Thorn Street (Calle de Concha Espina).
5. Translations of multinational corporations' names into Spanish: Ordenadores Manzana (Apple Computers).
6. Translations of Spanish minced oaths into English: Tu-tut that I saw you (Tararí que te vi).

The use of Spanglish has evolved over time. It has emerged as a way of conceptualizing one's thoughts whether it be in speech or on paper.

== Identity ==
The use of Spanglish can be associated with the speaker's expression of identity. As it is a form of code-switching, it can be used by individuals who have Hispanic heritage or those who do not. Like other forms of code-switching, Spanglish can facilitate communication with others who share the same linguistic background(s) and may therefore share similar cultural backgrounds as well. The practice of code-switching with Spanish and English continues, with new generations bringing new perspectives and practices that influence culture, which can be seen in media attempts to stay relevant through their language choices. Living within the United States, there is a power difference between Spanish and English, which can create many struggles for those who speak Spanish as their first language. However, Spanglish creates an environment where the native language one speaks no longer matters. As it requires proficiency in both Spanish and English to use Spanglish, it marks a space where identity can be expressed in unique ways.

== Intergenerational Spanglish ==
Immigrant youth in the United States have become prevalent social actors to sociologists because of their role as moderators and translators in their homes and the community. Orellana centers the ethnographic study around youth who have worked as translators in different spheres of societal issues for their communities. It showcases the division of labor passed onto members of the immigrant population and the navigational skills obtained by those obligated to utilize their bilingualism to code-switch as a means of survival. Intergenerational skills like bilingualism can then be used as a ‘Fund of Knowledge’ to promote literacy in the classroom. ‘Funds of Knowledge’ encourages the use of translanguaging (using all of one's full linguistic reportoire to communicate) in the classroom to bridge the skills used at home and welcome them to a classroom. This allows the use of code-switching, or Spanglish, skills passed between generations to be viewed as equally valuable at home and in academia. It dismantles the idea that specific languages need to be segregated from the educational realm of society.

== Arts and culture ==
=== Literature ===
Books that feature Spanglish in a significant way include the following:

- Giannina Braschi's Yo-Yo Boing! (1998) is the first Spanglish novel.
- Guillermo Gómez-Peña uses Spanglish in his performances.
- Matt de la Peña's novel Mexican WhiteBoy (2008) features flourishes of Spanglish.
- Junot Díaz's The Brief Wondrous Life of Oscar Wao also uses Spanglish words and phrases.
- Pedro Pietri wrote the poem El Spanglish National Anthem. (1993)
- Ilan Stavans Spanglish: The Making of a New American Language. (2004)
- Piri Thomas wrote the autobiography Down These Mean Streets (1967) using Spanglish phrases.
- Yoss' science fiction novel Super Extra Grande (2009) is set in a future where Latin Americans have colonized the galaxy and Spanglish is the lingua franca among the galaxy's sentient species.
- H. G. Wells's future history The Shape of Things to Come (1933) predicted that in the 21st century English and Spanish would "become interchangeable languages".
- Germán Valdés, a Mexican comedian, (known as Tin Tan) made heavy use of Spanglish. He dressed as a pachuco.
- Julián Delgado Lopera, Fiebre Tropical, a queer Colombian wrote a book about evangelical Columbian community in Miami that relies heavily on Spanglish. The audiobook is recorded by the author and voices both their accent and the use of Spanglish. They also recorded a TED talk on the use of Spanglish.

=== Music ===
==== Overview ====
The use of Spanglish by incorporating English and Spanish lyrics into music has risen in the United States over time. In the 1980s 1.2% of songs in the Billboard Top 100 contained Spanglish lyrics, eventually growing to 6.2% in the 2000s. The lyrical emergence of Spanglish by way of Latin American musicians has grown tremendously, reflective of the growing Hispanic population within the United States.

- Mexican rock band Molotov, whose members use Spanglish in their lyrics.
- American progressive rock band The Mars Volta, whose song lyrics frequently switch back and forth between English and Spanish.
- Ska punk pioneers Sublime, whose singer Bradley Nowell grew up in a Spanish-speaking community, released several songs in Spanglish.
- American nu metal band Ill Niño frequently mix Spanish and English lyrics in their songs.
- Shakira (born Shakira Isabel Mebarak Ripoll), a Colombian singer-songwriter, musician and model.
- American singer, actress, producer, director, dancer, model, and businesswoman Jennifer Lopez.
- Sean Paul (born Sean Paul Ryan Francis Henriques), a Jamaican singer and songwriter.
- Ricky Martin (born Enrique Martín Morales), a Puerto Rican pop musician, actor and author.
- Pitbull (born Armando Christian Pérez), a successful Cuban-American rapper, producer and Latin Grammy Award-winning artist from Miami, Florida that has brought Spanglish into mainstream music through his multiple hit songs.
- Enrique Iglesias, a Spanish singer-songwriter with songs in English, Spanish and Spanglish; Spanglish songs include Bailamos and Bailando.
- Rapper Silentó, famous for his song "Watch Me (Whip/Nae Nae)", recorded a version in Spanglish.
- Likewise, Mexican pop rock band Reik released a song called "Spanglish" in their album Secuencia.
- NEZZA is a pop singer best known for singing in Spanglish.

==== History ====
The rise of Spanglish in music within the United States also creates new classifications of Latin(o) music, as well as the wider Latin(o) music genre. In some growing music scenes, it is noted that for artists go beyond music and bring in political inclinations as a way to make wider commentary. Although Los Angeles Chicano bands from the 1960s and 1970s are often remembered as part of the Chicano-movement as agents for social chance, Latin(o) music has long been a way for artists to exercise political agency, including the post-World War II jazz scene, the New York City salsa of the 1970s, and the hip-hop movement of the 80s. Some of the topics addressed in these movements include: redlining and housing policies; immigration; discrimination; and transnationalism.

==== Commercialization ====
Over time, however, this more explicit show of political nature might have been lessened due to the desire to compete in the music business of the English speaking world. This however, did not stop the change in U.S. music, where English-speaking musicians have moved towards collaborative music, and bilingual duets are growing in popularity, indicating an audience demand for multi-language entertainment, as well as a space for traditional Latino artists to enter the mainstream and find chart success beyond the Spanish-speaking world. This is despite the slower-growing opportunities for Latino musicians to occupy higher-up positions such as promoters, business owners, and producers.

==== Present-day ====
With this growing demand for Spanglish duets, there has also been a rise in indie Latino artists who incorporate Spanglish lyrics in their music. One such artist is Omar Apollo, who combines Spanglish lyrics with music influenced by traditional corridos. Other up-and-coming Latino artists, such as Kali Uchis, Empress Of, and Ambar Lucid, have also led to a greater prominence of Hispanic performers and lyricism in the contemporary top charts. These types of artists, also being second-generation Spanish speakers, suggest that there is less fear or feelings of intimidation of using Spanish in public spaces. Moreover, this lack of negative connotation with public use of Spanglish and heritage-language language tools point to a subconscious desire to challenge negative rhetoric, as well as the racism that may go along with it. Given the fact that Spanglish has been the language of communication for a growing Hispanic-American population in the United States, its growing presence in Latino music is considered, by some scholars, a persistent and easily identifiable marker of an increasingly intersectional Latino identity.

== See also ==
- American literature in Spanish
- Nuyorican
- Caló (Chicano) a Mexican-American argot, similar to Spanglish
- Chicano English
- Code-switching
- Dog Latin
- Dunglish
- Franglais
- Hispanicisms in English
- Languages in the United States
- List of English words of Spanish origin
- Llanito (an Andalusian vernacular unique to Gibraltar)
- Portuñol, the unsystematic mixture of Portuguese with Spanish
- Siyokoy, hybrid words in Filipino and other Philippine languages derived from English and Spanish words
- Spanglish (film)
- Spanish language in the United States
- Spanish dialects and varieties
- Category:Forms of English
- Category:Spanglish songs
