= Linguistic racism =

Use of language resources for discrimination

In the terminology of linguistic anthropology, linguistic racism, both spoken and written, is a mechanism that perpetuates discrimination, marginalization, and prejudice customarily based on an individual or community's linguistic background. The most evident manifestation of this kind of racism is racial slurs; however, there are covert forms of it. Linguistic racism also relates to the concept of "racializing discourses," which is defined as the ways race is discussed without being explicit but still manages to represent and reproduce race. This form of racism acts to classify people, places, and cultures into social categories while simultaneously maintaining this social inequality under a veneer of indirectness and deniability.

Different forms of linguistic racism include covert and overt linguistic racism, linguistic appropriation, linguistic profiling, linguistic erasure, standard language ideology, pejorative naming, and accent discrimination. Relevantly, linguistic purism is a foundational factor in many forms of linguistic racism, as it is a practice of defining a language as purer or of higher quality relationally to other languages. Therefore, linguistic purism is also motivated by protecting the perceived purity of specific languages from "corruption" or degradation, further defining and classifying languages and cultures hierarchically based on a perceived difference of quality or historical authenticity. Because language and race have been deeply intertwined historically, race remains a crucial concept in understanding how languages are defined and how the study of language developed.^{: 382}

Languages coincide with classifying and reinforcing racial groups and the social associations with those groups, which relates to racialization. Racialization is the process of imposing and prescribing a racial category to a person or group, often by associating certain racialized traits such as cultural history, skin color, and physical features.^{: 382} Language constitutes authoritative knowledge as well. When speaking a specific language, one adopts its ideas of morality and discipline, including the dynamics of power that gives particular groups authority and others not.^{: 117} Additionally, how languages are taught and standardized contributes to how authoritative knowledge is created.^{: 117}

Andrea Moro in his essay, "La Razza e la lingua" ("Race and Language"), shows that there are two ideas that look innocuous if considered as separated but which are extremely dangerous if combined: first, that there are languages that are better than others; second, that reality is perceived and elaborated differently, according to the language one speaks. He highlights that this linguistic racism was at the origin of the myth of the Aryan race and the devastating results it had on civilization.

Scholars known for their work on linguistic racism and related concepts such as linguicism and linguistic imperialism include Jane H. Hill, Tove Skutnabb-Kangas, Suresh Canagarajah, Geneva Smitherman, and Teun A. van Dijk. Linguistic racism is studied in multiple disciplines, which include communication studies, sociolinguistics, linguistic anthropology, education, and psychology.

== Origins and development ==
How race is defined and described is implicated in the dynamics of power and the violence of colonialism.^{: 312} Difference has been recorded and actualized prior to the emergence of race as a category. Christopher Columbus' mistaken belief that the inhabitants of the island of Canibales engaged in the consumption of human flesh popularized the term "cannibal."^{: 311} This term not only supplanted "anthropophagy" in reference to consuming human flesh but embodied the construct of the other and became the ultimate personification of an antithetical to a "civilized," normative existence.^{: 311}^{: 19} Race as a social category that defines physical characteristics in connection to ancestry was formed in the late eighteenth century.^{: 312} The emergence of race included the social creation of hierarchies that positioned white Europeans at its top, with other racialized groups such as Black Africans and Australian Aborigenés at the bottom.^{: 312} Within these linguistic traditions of conceptualizing race, color terms such as black or white became a topology associated with racialization regardless of its visual reality.^{: 312} Within the Western imagination, color typologies reinforced the binarisms of race, especially between white and black, which became codified signifiers of social, racialized hierarchies.^{:313}

In the late fifteenth century, European expansion began, and the rise of dominant language ideologies occurred with the increase in missionary travel. In recording and studying Indigenous languages for the aim of conversion, Missionaries created linguistic hierarchies based on written and oral knowledge.^{: 36-37} Cultures that were predominantly oral and without writing systems were positioned as inferior to those with alphabet systems.^{: 38} Another function of missionaries was to choose a chosen language, typically a colonial language or indigenous language ranked high hierarchically, and impose it on communities that were linguistically diverse.^{: 38-39} Reducing linguistic diversity, which was perceived as a sign of primitiveness and barbarism, was one of the main goals of missionary projects.^{: 39}

The late nineteenth century was characterized by the advent of industrial capitalism, which saw the increase in immigration from Eastern and Southern Europeans as well as the internal migration of African Americans seeking a better life in the Northern states.^{: 77} This period of time is marked by rising social inequities, economic crises, and global expansion. The U.S. began to construct what constituted the Other, and these discourses influenced how linguistic practices and ethnic groups were categorized. In 1859, On the Origin of Species by Charles Darwin was published, which influenced key debates and arguments surrounding colonialism, capitalism, and the ideas of evolution and eugenics. Darwin’s theories of evolution used evidence from societal conflicts to argue that the supplantation of other groups is a marker of a natural process that led to the improvement of intelligence through natural selection.^{: 64}

The rise in evolutionary theory intersected with discussions surrounding race and language, in which philologists and linguists used the comparative method to systematically hierarchize languages. This technique sought to identify certain language groups and, by extension, their speakers as a representation of an early, primitive stage of evolution while others as more advanced and civilized.^{: 59} Later in the early twentieth century, Franz Boas and his students, especially Edward Sapir, challenged evolutionary theory and the comparative method, instead proposing historical particularism as an alternative to how languages and societies are studied.^{5: 59-60} Contrary to ranking cultures and languages on a spectrum, Boas posits that cultures should be studied within the nuanced conditions of their own contexts and histories, the hybridity of pidgins and creoles, and an emphasis on fieldwork to combat discrimination.^{: 60} Edward Sapir, with his student Benjamin Whorf, developed the Sapir-Whorf hypothesis and contributed to the discussions of how language influences the perception of one's reality, which is defined as linguistic relativity.

== Forms ==
=== Overt and covert linguistic racism ===
Overt linguistic racism may be expressed in the form of mocking, teasing, laughing, joking, ridiculing, and interrupting. Covert linguistic racism, on the other hand, is expressed through indirect and passive-aggressive acts of social exclusion. In the U.S., covert linguistic racism plays a role in a lack of diverse participation in large studies or political participation, as sufficient access to translations is often excluded. Counties with higher than average minority population percentages and counties with lower percentages of English-speaking residents have lower participation rates in survey participation due to lack of accommodation or outreach.

==== Personally mediated racism and microaggressions ====
Personally mediated racism is defined as the interpersonal interactions between individuals or groups that may marginalize or discriminate against one party. Personally mediated racism may take the form of microaggressions, which often manifest negative connotations regarding an individual's or group's speech patterns or linguistic expressions in a demeaning manner.^{: 383} Linguistic racism underscores how race and linguistic practices are intertwined and how languages can be a tool for perpetuating racism. The everyday biases that define microaggressions are exemplified in statements that claim someone talks like or sounds like a specific cultural or racial group (Indian, Black, White, Mexican, etc.)^{: 383}

Examples of microaggressions also include derogatory remarks about someone's intelligence based on their manner of speaking, suggesting unwarranted assumptions about someone's cultural identity and linguistic homogeneity within racial or ethnic groups.^{: 383} These statements imply that members of a certain group are expected to talk and linguistically express themselves in the same manner, may insinuate that deviations from presumed cultural norms are abnormal, and can falsely imply that one's linguistic characteristics are dissociated from their culture.^{: 383} Instructors who are non-native English speakers (NNES) are impacted by student evaluations that undergird ideologies of "nativeness," or the measurement of one's linguistic competence based on being a native speaker, which holds the assumption that non-native speakers have accents or are linguistically incomprehensible.^{: 37} In a study of student evaluations of Asian American professors on Rate My Professor, Subtirelu found that many students mentioned the instructor's accents in a manner that questioned their linguistic competency.^{: 53} While the dominant language ideology of nativeness was present in these student evaluations, there was also frequent resistance to it by students acknowledging the instructor's linguistic competence or accent but conceding one understands over time.^{: 53} This pattern Subtirelu detected shows how some students navigate or resist biases against NNES instructors.^{: 53}

One's capacity to shift into and communicate with a standard dialect can significantly influence one's social status, signifying that racial and social identity can vary depending on certain contexts.^{: 169} Arthur K. Spears conveys how individuals can deploy what he terms "whiteners," which are linguistic strategies used by non-white people to situationally alter their individual status to modify the consequences of their racialized or marginalized status may invoke.^{: 169} For example, Black people may use a standard linguistic dialect when interacting with police officers to convey a higher social status and attempt to mitigate the effects of racial profiling.^{: 169}

==== Naming ====
Names are tied to social meanings that may index and convey one's gender, ethnicity, class, religion, and other positionalities.^{: 274} Another form of linguistic racism is the process of ethnoracialized groups being misnamed or denamed, which can be a process of public shaming that others and linguistically marginalize people.^{: 274} Many marginalized groups such as immigrants, indigenous people, and African Americans endure the experience of their names being mispronounced, anglicized, or even replaced, which represents how specific names undergo a process of becoming deracialized and normative.^{: 285} An example of this includes the social phenomenon, most common in educational institutions and classrooms, where students have their names mispronounced or their given name displaced due to the assumption that their names are foreign or hard to pronounce.^{: 276} Many marginalized groups, however, do claim the right to name themselves such as choosing a new name, maintaining multiple pronunciations, and having different naming practices.^{: 285}

=== Linguistic appropriation and mock language ===
Linguistic appropriation is the act of adopting linguistic patterns and elements of a language or dialect other than one’s own, typically without a cultural understanding or acknowledgment of said language and its social nuances. Linguistic appropriation typically affects languages or linguistic backgrounds that are historically marginalized. It can occur in everyday conversation but also in the media and advertisements, in which certain dialects and their associated stereotypes are utilized to represent socially desirable qualities attributed to that language. Therefore, this appropriation contributes to the erasure, marginalization, and trivialization of the targeted language or dialect. African American Vernacular English (AAVE) has been the target of linguistic appropriation for white audiences to make them appear knowledgeable about pop culture and have a “cool” persona that is adopted through the use of AAVE.^{: 169} However, these appropriations index dangerous and negative stereotypes attributed to African Americans, including hyper-masculinity, higher rates of violence, and promiscuity.^{: 169} Donor groups, which are the communities from which the language is appropriated, express linguistic appropriation as a form of theft in which those who utilize it reap the benefits of its associations while not acknowledging its origins.^{: 169}^{: 218-222}

Another example of linguistic appropriation began as early as the seventeenth century in the incorporation of loanwords from indigenous languages into the English language, including place names.^{: 162} As an example, White Americans have historically appropriated indigenous place names to construct the idea of an "American" landscape, which includes locations such as "Massachusetts," "Chattahoochee," and "Tucson."^{:162-3} William O. Bright's research on indigenous place names defines the concept of "transfers," which refers to place names from indigenous languages that are used in locations disconnected from those languages, reflecting an assimilation of these names into White narratives and an alienation and alteration from its indigenous origins.^{: 370}

Mock language is defined as the action of imitating and mimicking another language, incorporating grammatical structures, expressions, and terminology that is not native to the speaker. Speakers of mock Spanish reasoned their usage of it as a signifier of being exposed to Spanish, to incite amusement, or to claim regional authenticity to primarily the Southwest, California, or Floria.^{: 683} To understand the logic and semiotics of mock Spanish as humorous or even intelligible, it requires access to and understanding of negative stereotypes of Latinos and Chicanos.^{: 683} The works of Jane H. Hill on "mock Spanish," of Barbara A. Meek on "Hollywood Injun English", of Ronkin and Kan on parodies of Ebonics, of Elaine Chun "Ideologies of Legitimate Mockery" on "mock Asian," etc., demonstrate how parodying or re-appropriating non-English languages contributes to presenting certain cultures as inferior to European Americans by disparaging their languages.

== See also ==
- Mock language
- Linguistic imperialism
- Linguistic discrimination
- Linguistic profiling
- Linguistic purism
- Standard language ideology
