= Mock Spanish =

Spanish-inspired phrases used by American English speakers

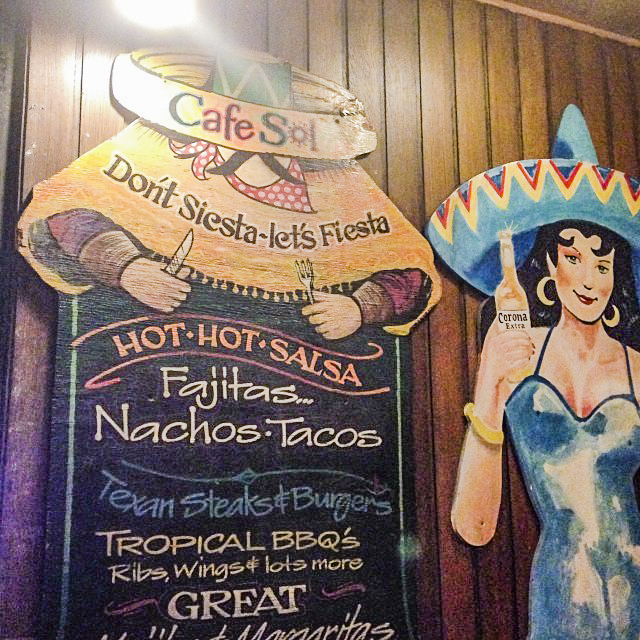
English-language menu featuring mock Spanish

Mock Spanish (Spanish: pseudoespañol, lit. 'Pseudo-Spanish') is a loaded term used to describe a variety of Spanish-inspired phrases used by speakers of English in the United States. The term "mock Spanish" has been used by anthropologist-linguist Jane H. Hill of the University of Arizona, most recognizably in relation to the catchphrase, "Hasta la vista, baby", from the film, Terminator 2: Judgment Day. Hill argued that using pseudo-Spanish terms is covert racism. Other researchers have extended Hill's analysis and suggested that "Mock Spanish" is a manifestation of linguistic racism.

== Background ==
English speakers in the United States have had a long history of connection and interaction with the Spanish language; first from Spain, and later from Mexico and other Latin American countries. The high degree of contact between Spanish and English in the United States inevitably led to loanwords, calques, code switching and other manifestations of interactions between language that are common throughout the world.

In the late 1940s, the Puerto Rican journalist, poet and essayist Salvador Tió coined the terms Espanglish for Spanish spoken with some English terms, and the less commonly used Inglañol for English spoken with some Spanish terms. This linguistic phenomenon reflects the multicultural and multilingual nature of American society and involves mixing words, phrases, and grammatical elements from both languages within a single conversation or even a single sentence. Spanglish also includes unique neologisms and calques (literal translations).

Beginning in the mid-1990s, English speaking academics in the United States influenced by critical race theory began to theorize that the use of certain Spanish terms by native English speakers in certain contexts in the United States is a form of racism.

== Research ==
In the 1990s, anthropologist-linguist Jane H. Hill of the University of Arizona suggested that "Mock Spanish" is a form of racist discourse. Hill asserted, with anecdotal evidence, that "middle- and upper-income, college-educated whites" casually use Spanish-influenced language in way that native Spanish speakers were likely to find insulting. She also noted that many of those who make use of "Mock Spanish" or mock language in general consider it harmless or even flattering.

Hill contrasted mock Spanish with two other registers of "Anglo Spanish" that she referred to as "Nouvelle Spanish" (largely used to provide a Spanish flavor for marketing purposes, e.g. "the land of mañana" used to describe the Southwest or "Hair Casa" as the name of a beauty salon) and "Cowboy Spanish" (loanwords for region-specific objects and concepts, such as coyote, mesa, and tamale).

Linguist Laura Callahan, building on Hill's study, searched for further examples of "Mock Spanish" as a possible marker of racism. Callahan's study found that people who use "Mock Spanish" (Anglo-Americans) see the use as "Good fun" and suggests that native Spanish speakers may consider it to be "Making fun."

Researcher Ana Celia Zentella suggests that mock Spanish represents a double standard in which Hispanics are expected to conform to the linguistic norms of English while Anglo-Americans are free to ignore grammatical aspects of the Spanish language they are borrowing from.

Author Adam Schwartz argues that the use of Mock Spanish by middle and upper class whites in the United States contributes to the creation of a "white public space" in which "...[the] unspoken and institutionalized White normalcy underlying [Mock Spanish] carries over to spaces where language is learned, spoken and (re) claimed."

Researcher Rusty Barrett's observations of the use of "Mock Spanish" in a Mexican restaurant is heavily cited by scholars who argue that "Mock Spanish" implies a form of racism. Barrett's article, however, is nuanced. Barrett suggests, for example, that the lack of attention paid to the Spanish language by the Anglo-Americans managing the restaurant may allow Spanish speakers on staff to establish their agency in other ways, for example, by openly and loudly speaking their opinions and even mocking the Anglo-managers in Spanish. Additionally, Barrett observed that monolingual Spanish workers at this restaurant used their language to mock their English speaking coworkers. In one example, Spanish speaking kitchen staff hid the garbage bags from the English speaking bartenders and demanded free beer in exchange for the bags, which the bartenders needed in order to clean up and close the bar. A bartender in search of bags told Barrett, “The bags are in the escondidas, wherever that is.”

== See also ==
- Spanglish
