= Dialect discrimination =

Prejudice based on linguistic features

Dialect discrimination refers to the unequal treatment of those whose dialect contains linguistic features identifying them with a certain geographical or social group. It is connected to linguistic discrimination and linguistic racism.

One may experience dialect discrimination in a number of settings, but this type of discrimination may be most prominent in the workplace. While there is not enough data to know how often it occurs, it is possible that a number of people may experience dialect discrimination during the job application process, as employers strive for their staff to utilize a more “standardized” or “neutral” form of speaking.

Dialect discrimination may also be present in education and politics. Children in school whose dialect does not closely resemble the standard form of speaking may not receive the same education. Likewise, those who speak in a manner that is not associated with the common dialect of an area or country may be slandered or even unable to vote in politics. It is disputed whether this form of discrimination is prohibited by the EEOC.

== Connections to other factors ==
Discrimination can be defined as the unfair treatment of a person or a group based on something for which they identify. Discrimination is often seen as categorical. Some categorical examples of this include, but are not limited to; race, gender, age or sexual orientation.

Dialect discrimination is linked to perceptions of dialects in relation to race, class, national origin, and other categories. For instance, in the United States, Southern accents are associated with lower class individuals, and there is a resulting reduction in pay offered to those with Southern accents compared to accents perceived as more "neutral."

There is also language discrimination, when someone is treated/looked at differently than others because of their native language or how they speak the common language of the area (such as English in much of the United States). This is typically related to dialect and accent discrimination, too. Dialect or accent discrimination, are considered as part of the category of national origin. Therefore, they are covered under the Title VII of the Civil Rights Act of 1964, which prohibits an employer from discriminating against any individual with respect to his or her compensation, terms/condition, or privileges of employment because of that individual’s national origin.

== Examples of dialect discrimination ==
=== Workplace ===
A good example of dialect discrimination would be workplace dialect discrimination. A lot of times, individuals will not be hired for a job because of the way they speak or sound. And another thing that is difficult and at the Forefront of media, today is the fact that if one's primary language is not English and one is trying to get hired by an English-speaking company, many companies will not hire this individual because of this. Although this is seen as illegal in many states, it is still a very wide reason why some people do not get jobs. The employer may not tell the employee that that is the reason he or she is not being hired, but usually, it is the underlying cause.

=== Education ===
Dialect discrimination can be found is in schools. Something that a lot of families struggle with is they will put their child in a school that is primarily English-speaking, and the child will get discriminated against and not get the same tools that other students are getting as far as learning goes because of the way they speak or sound. In the US, Hispanic languages get looked down on in primary education schools. Because of this, a lot of Hispanic immersion schools have been created, however language and dialect discrimination is the root cause.

=== Political ===
There is dialect discrimination in politics. A lot of times, candidates running for a government position are discriminated against because of the way they sound: for example, people may label a political figure as undereducated based on their dialect and/or accent.
