= Mockney =

Affected accent in imitation of working-class London speech

Mockney (a portmanteau of "mock" and "cockney") is an affected accent and form of speech in imitation of cockney or working-class London speech, or a person with such an accent. A stereotypical mockney speaker comes from an upper-middle-class background.

A person speaking with a mockney accent might adopt cockney pronunciation but retain standard grammatical forms, whereas the genuine cockney speaker uses non-standard forms (e.g. negative concord).

== Details ==
According to the Oxford English Dictionary, the first published use of the word 'mockney' was in 1967.

It is an affectation sometimes adopted for aesthetic or theatrical purposes, and at other times to sound "cool", to generate street credibility, or to give the false impression that the speaker rose from humble beginnings and became prominent through hard work and innate talent rather than the education, contacts and other advantages of a privileged background. Britpop band Blur was said to have a "mockney, down-the-dogs blokey charm". Mick Jagger is often accused of being the first celebrity in modern times to overplay his regional accent in order to boost his street credibility.

One explanation of dialect adoption given in social linguistics is the desire for prestige; a person is likely to adopt speech patterns (including accent, vocabulary, dialect or even language) which they perceive to be prestigious.

The concept of communication accommodation, either upwards or downwards in idiolect, can be seen in many social interactions. One can put someone at ease by speaking in a familiar tone or intonation, or one can intimidate or alienate someone by speaking more formally. For example, in a courtroom, a more formal voice register with technical legal jargon can be used to intimidate a defendant. In contrast, mockney seeks to lower the perceived socio-economic class of the speaker.

== Notable people described as using mockney speech ==
- Damon Albarn
- Lily Allen
- Russell Brand
- Nigel Kennedy
- Kate Nash
- Jamie Oliver
- Tim Roth
- Joe Strummer

== See also ==
- Class tourism
- Estuary English
- Mid-Atlantic accent
- Mock language
- Mummerset
- Received Pronunciation
- Sociolinguistics
