= Solanum fallax =

Conservation status
- Near Threatened (IUCN 2.3)

Scientific classification
- Kingdom: Plantae
- Clade: Tracheophytes
- Clade: Angiosperms
- Clade: Eudicots
- Clade: Asterids
- Order: Solanales
- Family: Solanaceae
- Genus: Solanum
- Species: S. fallax

Binomial name
- Solanum fallax Bohs

Species of flowering plant

Solanum fallax is a species of plant the belongs to the family Solanaceae (nightshades). This species can be found in Colombia and Ecuador where it can be found inhabiting ravines and pockets of forests. Compare to other species in its genus, it endures a more severe dry season. It has pubescent fruits.

== Phylogeny ==
Solanum fallax is a member of the Cyphomandra clade. It’s placement within the genus has varied often being placed within section Pachyphylla or Cyphomandropsis. However ITS data suggest that it is more closely related to section Pachyphylla unexpectedly emerging as a sister species to Solanum cajanumense. Both species share a similar range along the western regions of Colombia and Ecuador. Solanum calidum is also a closely related sister species.
