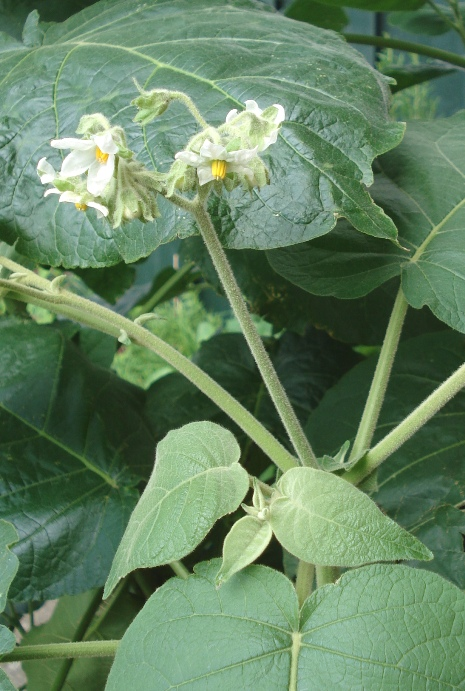
- Blossoms and leaves
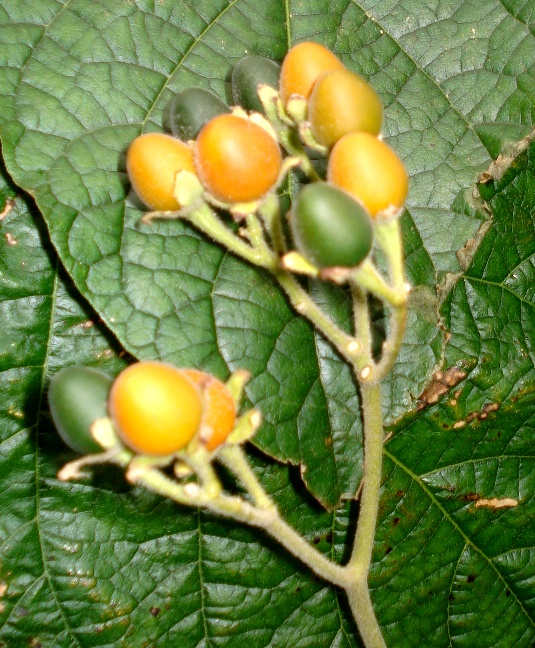
- Fruits at different stages of ripeness

Scientific classification
- Kingdom: Plantae
- Clade: Tracheophytes
- Clade: Angiosperms
- Clade: Eudicots
- Clade: Asterids
- Order: Solanales
- Family: Solanaceae
- Genus: Solanum
- Species: S. abutiloides

Binomial name
- Solanum abutiloides (Griseb.) Bitter & Lillo

= Solanum abutiloides =

Species of flowering plant

Solanum abutiloides is a species of plant in the family Solanaceae. It is endemic to Argentina and Bolivia, and thrives as a weedy plant in rocky land, on stream banks, and scrub land between 900–3600 metres (3000–11800 ft) in elevation. It is also known as dwarf tamarillo, due to superficial similarities with Solanum betaceum. Solanum abutiloides is also sometimes known by the archaic name Cyphomandra abutiloides.

Solanum abutiloides quickly matures into a shrub or small tree up to 9 m (30 ft) tall, though usually far smaller. The heart-shaped leaves have a distinctive and pungent smell.

Small flowers form on branches throughout the plant, and individual clusters of flowers can contain as many as 60 blooms. Blooms are followed by fruits—a small oblong berry that turns yellow-orange as it ripens. The berries are around 1 cm (0.39 in) (or slightly larger) in diameter. When unripe, the berries are mildly toxic (as are tamarillos), though they are edible upon ripening.

== Distribution and habitat ==
The native range of Solanum abutiloides includes central and southern Bolivia and northwestern Argentina. It has been found in the Canary Islands, and at a single location in Morocco, possibly as a result of seed deposition by fruit-eating birds migrating transoceanically. It was introduced into Austria and Australia.

== Uses ==
The fruits are edible, though Solanum abutiloides is rare in cultivation, and plants have not been bred for quality of flavor. Therefore, the fruit can often have an unpredictable or unpleasant flavor, and Solanum abutiloides is most often cultivated as an ornamental plant, as the clusters of ripe fruit are very decorative.

Similar to Solanaceae, pests like aphids, spider mites, and white flies are attracted to the trees.

== Chemical constituents ==
The roots of Solanum abutiloides contain 7 cholestane-based steroidal glycosides known as abutilosides A through G. They are proposed to be intermediates in biological pathways for the synthesis of alkaloids.
