= Nanpie =

Asian sauce-like side dish

Nanmi (Nan Piě, ᥢᥣᥢᥙᥥ)
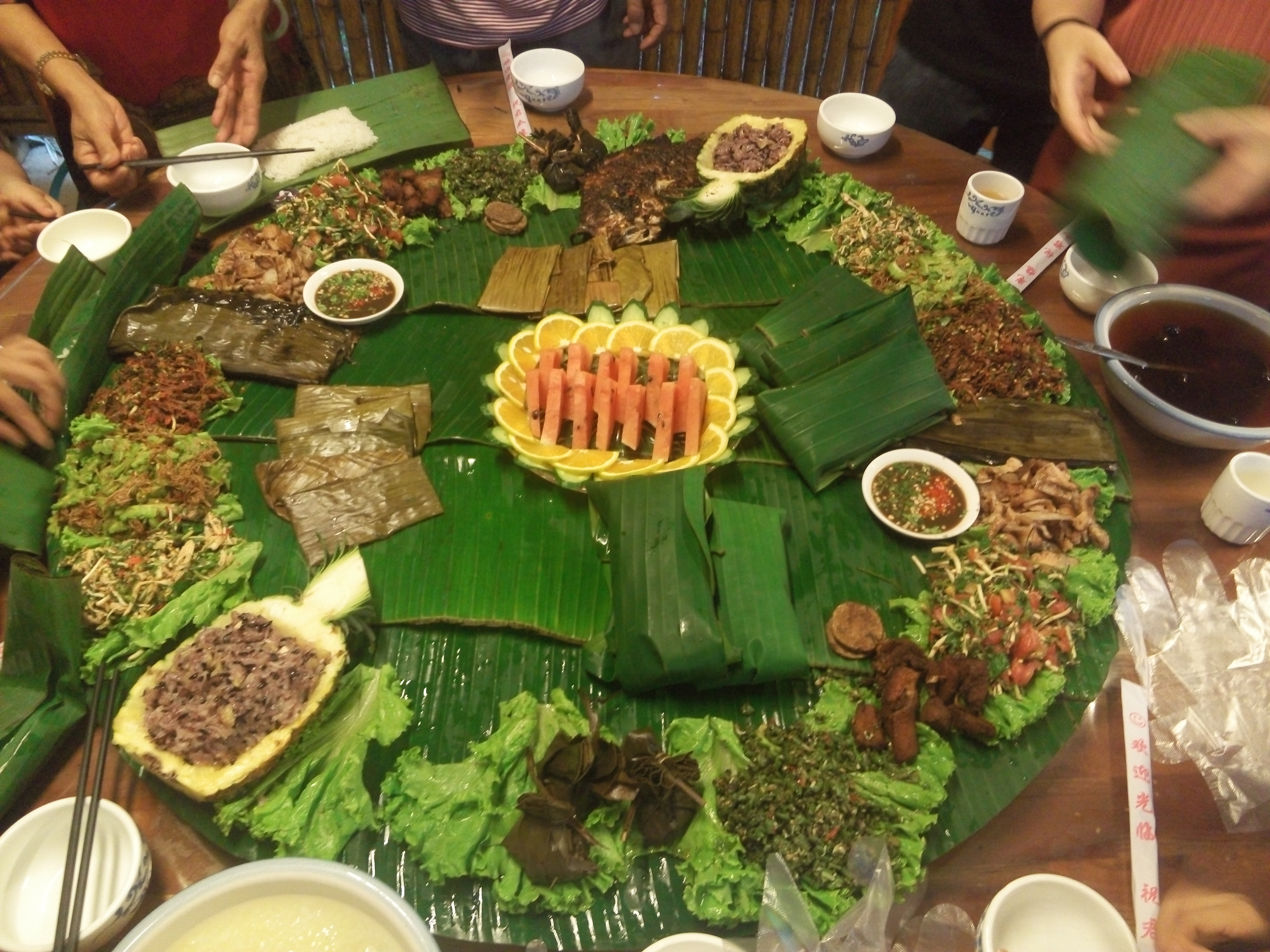
- Traditional Dai meal with bowls of Nanpie
- Type: sauce/dip
- Course: main (side dish)
- Place of origin: Yunnan, China, Myanmar
- Region or state: Southwest Yunnan (Dehong region), Northeast Myanmar
- Created by: Dai people

Nanmi or Nanpie (Chinese: 喃撇; pinyin: nan piě; Tai Nüa: ᥢᥣᥢᥙᥥ) is a traditional Dai sauce-like side dish made with various fresh ingredients, herbs and spices.

Nan piě is made by pestling various ingredients to form a pungent paste which is accompanied with other dishes such as rice. It can be also used as a dip. Common variations of nanmi are tamarillo nanpie, goby nanpie and black nightshade nanpie. Popular herbs and spices used in nanpie are, coriander, chili peppers, sawtooth coriander, garlic, ginger and basil. Nanpie is a key dish during traditional Dai banquets and it is said that the more nanpie are on the table the more delicious and important the meal is.

Nanpie was featured on the Netflix food documentary series, Flavorful Origins in the second episode or the second season which highlighted Yunnanese culinary traditions.
