= Mock language =

Way of using a language not spoken by a speaker

Mock language is a way of using a language not spoken by or native to a speaker.

When talking, the speaker includes words or phrases from other languages that they think fit into the conversation. The term "Mock Spanish" was popularized in the 1990s by Jane H. Hill, a linguist at the University of Arizona. Mock Spanish is the most common form of mock language in the southwestern United States, where Hill first researched the phenomenon. The term "Mock" has since been applied to other languages, and the umbrella term "Mock language" developed. Mock language is commonly viewed as a form of appropriation, and is used to share meaning between the speaker and audience about the speech community the speaker is mocking.

== Definition ==
The term "Mock Spanish" was popularized in the 1990s by linguistic anthropologist Jane H. Hill. This naming convention led to similar cases being referred to as "Mock-Languages". Increasing globalization in modern history has contributed significantly to the spread and study of Mock-Language in linguistic anthropology. More languages are being encountered in daily interactions, and more people are able to travel. To show one's global perspective, it is common to incorporate words of foreign languages into one's speech.

When using mock language, the speaker is showing their 'cosmopolitanism' or global knowledge. Mock language borrows words from different languages and uses them in the speaker's context. In contrast with usages of languages that effectively borrow terms, mock language does not show awareness of the cultural or social meanings behind the words spoken. Using words outside the speaker's native language often ignores the context of the conversation, the meaning of the word or phrase, or any conceptual knowledge including historical injustices to the borrowed language, culture, or physical surroundings.

The usage of mock language may reinforce language ideologies. For example, an American speaker who uses mock language is indexing a language ideology that all Americans should speak English or that other languages are secondary in the US. A dominant language ideology is that English should be the official language spoken in the United States, establishing English as a hegemonic language. This hegemony creates a dominance of the hegemonic group over the ones that do not conform. Mock language reinforces this ideology, as it takes language and culture out of context to show the speaker's worldly knowledge, but does not celebrate or effectively use the language. The dominant ideology does not allow these groups to celebrate their language, yet "mock language involves borrowings and wordplay by speakers who require little comprehension of the other language."

== Research ==
=== Inner and outer spheres ===
In a 1998 study, Hill analyzes the 'inner sphere' and 'outer sphere' in which Puerto Ricans living in New York use their bilingualism. In the inner sphere, such as neighbors, family, and close friends, the boundaries between English and Spanish are blurred formally and functionally. However, in the outer sphere with strangers or government officials, the usage of Spanish becomes marked and "sharply objectified" to the point where the boundaries are so distinct that bilingual speakers may become too scared to speak at all.

This study investigates the hegemonic power of English as a predominant language in America and how Spanish speakers feel vulnerable and powerless to use Spanish. In contrast, when English speakers mock Spanish, their agency extends beyond English hegemony and into the power an English speaker holds in American society. Hill also discusses how semantic domains index a state.

=== Mock White Girl ===
"Mock White Girl" is a type of mock language that is inspired by the stereotypical "white girl's" vernacular. It commonly uses features such as 'like' in excess to imply that the speaker is not well-spoken or articulate. It also features uptalk, creaky voice, blondeness, and a stereotypical association with Starbucks. Mock White Girl is commonly used in movies where teenage girls speak in standard English with vocal fry and are portrayed as privileged, popular, and in power.

In a 2018 study of Mock White Girl, researcher Tyanna Slobe discussed the implications of a "mock language" whose target language is an English dialect rather than a foreign language. Slobe describes the phenomenon as "...complicating the moralizing gaze with which linguists have approached mock as uniformly reproducing white supremacist ideologies." Mock White Girl satirizes a white, upper-class, suburban, spoiled young adult demographic and conveys a shared meaning that the language the speaker is mocking is subordinate and not to be taken seriously. It indexes the characteristics of a stereotypical white girl and uses the n+1 level of Indexicality for the public to make the connection between the mockery and the speech community.

== Language crossing ==
Another semantic domain is language crossing. "Language crossing involves code alternation by people who are not part of the group associated with the second language that they are using. Code switching into varieties that are not generally thought to belong to them. This kind of switching involves movement across social or ethnic boundaries, which raises issues of legitimacy where participants must negotiate in their encounter." This is similar to mock language as the people code alternating are not members of the group. How mock-language speakers are English speakers not members of the language they are mocking is similar to this.

== Effects of globalization ==
Studying mock language preserves the original foundations of languages or dialects that have become subject to the pressure of globalization. Each time a mock phrase is used, it reinforces the divergence from the original language. Globalization occurs at a much faster rate today than in the past, largely due to technological advancements that connect the world with no regard for national borders. American culture is overwhelmingly dominant in the field of online media, and thus American interpretations of other cultures often become somewhat of a universal standard, at least in terms of exposure. This makes it important for linguists to analyze such interpretations and recognize their origins.

Mock language is used in anthropology and linguistics to interpret different languages in a conversation and the characteristics of borrowing words from a language. The study of Mock Language also reveals several powerful racial ideologies in the way English speakers have the agency to use other languages without regard for their cultural and historical importance. This leads to ignorance, regarding the use of certain phrases. Misuses of certain words can eventually be attributed to legitimate cultures after overuse.

== Additional examples ==
=== Mock Spanish ===
Cinco de Mayo, a holiday that celebrates Mexico's defeat of the French on May 5, 1862, has become extremely popular in the United States as a celebration based largely on the consumption of alcohol. Due to this association, the term "Cinco de Drinko" has emerged. This is an example of the "add 'o'" phenomenon. The "add 'o'" phenomenon is the practice of English speakers adding an "o" to the end of an English word in order to give it the false appeal of being a Spanish word. Speakers may use "el" or add an "o" at the end of words as if they are speaking mock Spanish (such as el cheapo, no problemo). Mock Spanish relies upon the semiotic construction of two stereotypes: the easygoing, humorous, and somewhat cosmopolitan white person, and the lazy, dirty, sexually "loose", and unintelligent Spanish speaker.

=== Mock Hindi ===
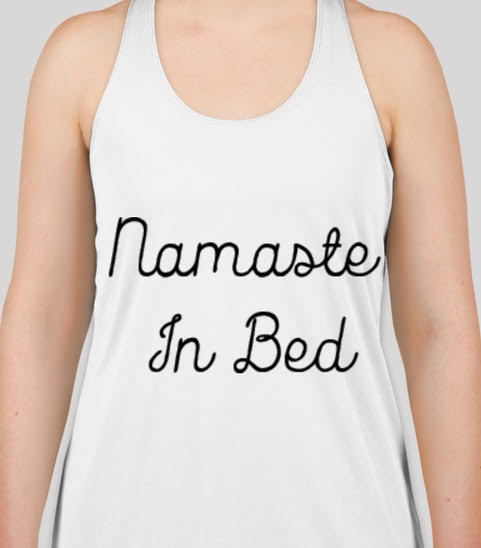
People usually wear this shirt to indicate that they are going to yoga or going to sleep and equate laziness and zen to a Hindi greeting.

Pictured is a T-shirt with the saying "namaste in bed". This borrows a traditional Hindi greeting and makes it into a pun, playing off of the slang term "imma stay in bed". It also associates the Hindi word as a yoga term, though this is used for greeting, not concluding a yoga session. It is in relation to being lazy. Mock Hindi has taken the word 'namaste' out of context.

=== Mock German ===
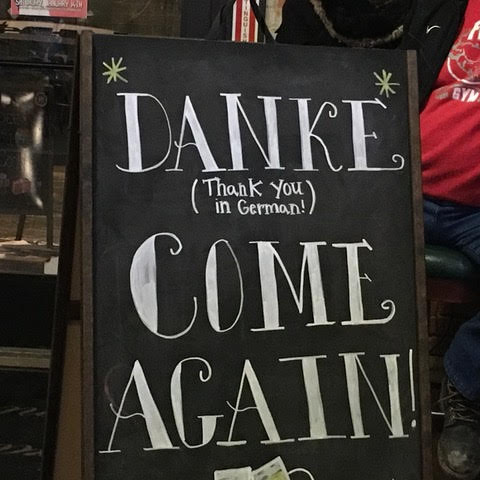
Danke Sign: This sign shows the business's affiliation to Germany. While trying to teach their English-speaking patrons a German word, it does not provide any pronunciation guides or context.

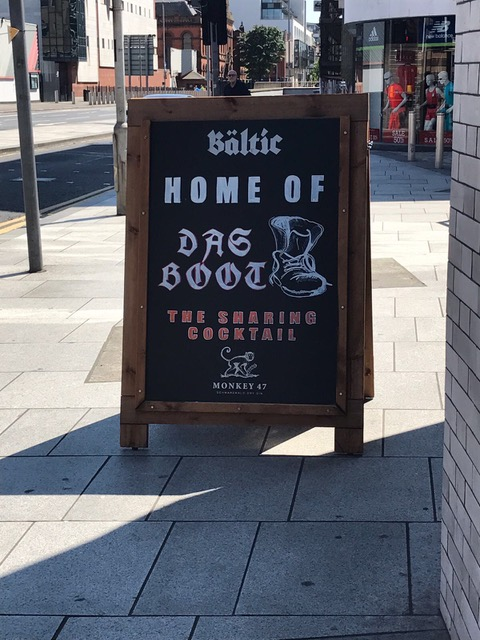
'Das Boot' mocks the German language for English speaking marketing purposes as "boot" does not translate into a type of footwear but to 'boat' in English. This shows the semantic domain which associates anything German with a drinking culture.

Bars and pubs around the world have signs that imitate European bar and pub culture. Often, German is incorporated due to the association of German culture with drinking. Danke is German for "thank you". The signs are using German as an international symbol of beer or drinking. The phrase "das boot" in German translates as "the boat" and has nothing to do with shoes or drinking. Using 'danke' shows knowledge of a direct translation.

== See also ==
- Mock Spanish
- Mockney
