= Salvador Tió =

Puerto Rican writer

- Born: November 15, 1911; Mayagüez, Puerto Rico
- Died: September 17, 1989 (aged 77); San Juan, Puerto Rico
- Occupation: Poet

Salvador Tió y Montes de Oca (November 15, 1911 – September 17, 1989) was a Puerto Rican poet, writer, and promoter of Puerto Rican culture, best known for coining the term "Spanglish".

== Early life ==
Salvador Tió y Montes de Oca, better known as Salvador Tió was born on November 15, 1911, in Mayagüez, Puerto Rico, to Salvador Tió y Malaret and his wife Teresa Montes de Oca y Branderes. He completed studies in law at Columbia Law School in New York and at the Complutense University of Portugal.

== Spanglish ==
In the late 1940s, Salvador coined the term espanglish, which later evolved to its current form, Spanglish. This was his response to the many Spanish-speaking people who immediately relinquished their mother tongue in order to learn English upon immigrating to non-Hispanic countries.

== Later years ==
Salvador later moved to San Juan, where he died on September 17, 1989. He was buried at Santa María Magdalena de Pazzis Cemetery in San Juan, Puerto Rico.
