= Injun (disambiguation) =

Injun, an obsolete alteration of "Indian" when referring to Native Americans; now sometimes considered pejorative, depending on context and intent. It may also refer to:

- Injun, a series of Van Allen Belt satellites
- Injun Creek (later renamed Engine Creek), a stream in Tennessee, U.S.
- Injun Joe, main antagonist of Mark Twain's The Adventures of Tom Sawyer

== See also ==
- Cajun
