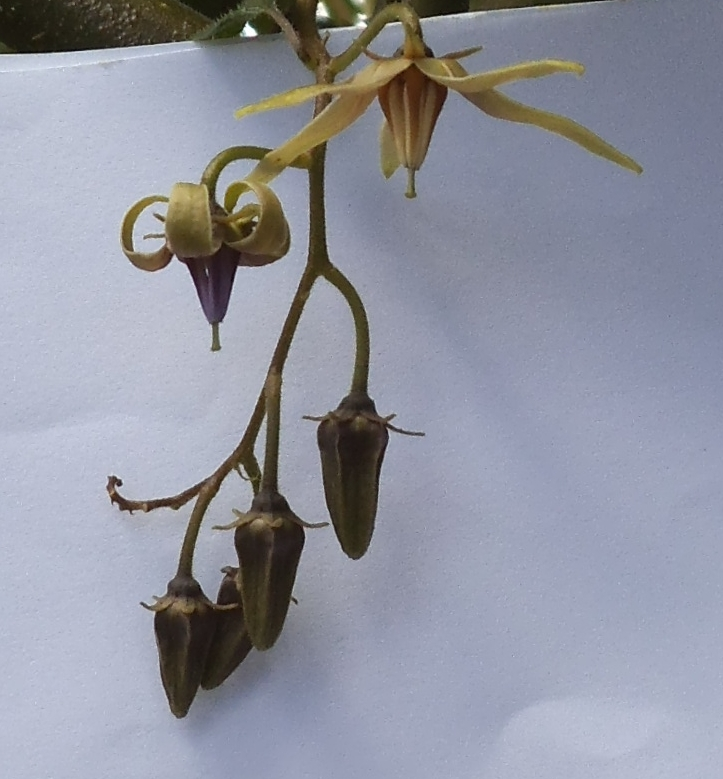
- Flower and flower buds

Conservation status
- Near Threatened (IUCN 2.3)

Scientific classification
- Kingdom: Plantae
- Clade: Tracheophytes
- Clade: Angiosperms
- Clade: Eudicots
- Clade: Asterids
- Order: Solanales
- Family: Solanaceae
- Genus: Solanum
- Species: S. melissarum

Binomial name
- Solanum melissarum Bohs

Synonyms
- Cyphomandra divaricata (Mart.) Sendtn.

= Solanum melissarum =

Species of flowering plant

Solanum melissarum is a small tree or shrub in the flowering plant family Solanaceae endemic to Brazil.

== Description ==
A small tree, from 1 to 6 metres high, usually with a single trunk. The crown of light branches carries simple, unlobed leaves. The flowering inflorescence is from 5 cm to 30 cm long, and carries 4 to 20 long, narrow flower buds. The narrow, slightly membranous flower petal are green-white. The petals curve upward at first opening, and become lax as the flower ages. The anthers are at first purple, changing to yellow-orange with age.

== Reproductive biology ==
The pendulous flowers have poricidal anthers close to the stigma, with membranous thecae joined by a connective bearing osmophores that attract males of Euglossa cordata bees. As they collect fragrances, the bees press the thecae and pollen is released through a bellows mechanism. Based on the hand-pollination treatments, this species is self-incompatible.
