= Solanum fortunense =

Conservation status
- Vulnerable (IUCN 2.3)

Scientific classification
- Kingdom: Plantae
- Clade: Tracheophytes
- Clade: Angiosperms
- Clade: Eudicots
- Clade: Asterids
- Order: Solanales
- Family: Solanaceae
- Genus: Solanum
- Species: S. fortunense

Binomial name
- Solanum fortunense Bohs

Species of flowering plant

Solanum fortunense is a species of plant in the family Solanaceae. It is found in Costa Rica and Panama.
