= Solanum sycocarpum =

Conservation status
- Endangered (IUCN 2.3)

Scientific classification
- Kingdom: Plantae
- Clade: Tracheophytes
- Clade: Angiosperms
- Clade: Eudicots
- Clade: Asterids
- Order: Solanales
- Family: Solanaceae
- Genus: Solanum
- Species: S. sycocarpum

Binomial name
- Solanum sycocarpum Mart.& Sendtn.

Species of flowering plant

Solanum sycocarpum is a species of plant in the family Solanaceae. It is endemic to Brazil.
