= Spanish language in New Zealand =

- Language family: Indo-European: Italic; Latino-Faliscan; Romance; Western; Ibero-Romance; West Iberian; Castilian; Spanish; Spanish language in New Zealand
- Early forms: Old Latin: Classical Latin; Vulgar Latin; Old Spanish; Early Modern Spanish
- Writing system: Latin (Spanish alphabet)

Language codes
- ISO 639-3: –
- IETF: es-NZ

The Spanish language began to be used in New Zealand with some regularity from the 1960s and early 1970s, mainly by immigrants from the Spanish-speaking countries of South America and some from Central America, Mexico, Spain, and Gibraltar.

== Statistics ==
Spanish speakers in New Zealand
| Census | Quantity | Percentage |
|---|---|---|
| 1996 | 10 692 | 0.2885% |
| 2001 | 14 676 | 0.3789% |
| 2006 | 21 645 | 0.5202% |
| 2013 | 26 979 | 0.6023% |

== See also ==
- Spanish New Zealanders
