= Solanum tobagense =

Conservation status
- Near Threatened (IUCN 2.3)

Scientific classification
- Kingdom: Plantae
- Clade: Tracheophytes
- Clade: Angiosperms
- Clade: Eudicots
- Clade: Asterids
- Order: Solanales
- Family: Solanaceae
- Genus: Solanum
- Species: S. tobagense

Binomial name
- Solanum tobagense (Sandwith) Bohs

Species of flowering plant

Solanum tobagense is a species of plant in the family Solanaceae. It is found in Guyana, Trinidad and Tobago, and Venezuela.
