= Solanum ovum-fringillae =

Conservation status
- Critically Endangered (IUCN 2.3)

Scientific classification
- Kingdom: Plantae
- Clade: Tracheophytes
- Clade: Angiosperms
- Clade: Eudicots
- Clade: Asterids
- Order: Solanales
- Family: Solanaceae
- Genus: Solanum
- Species: S. ovum-fringillae

Binomial name
- Solanum ovum-fringillae (Dunal) Bohs

Species of flowering plant

Solanum ovum-fringillae is a species of plant in the family Solanaceae. It is endemic to Brazil.
