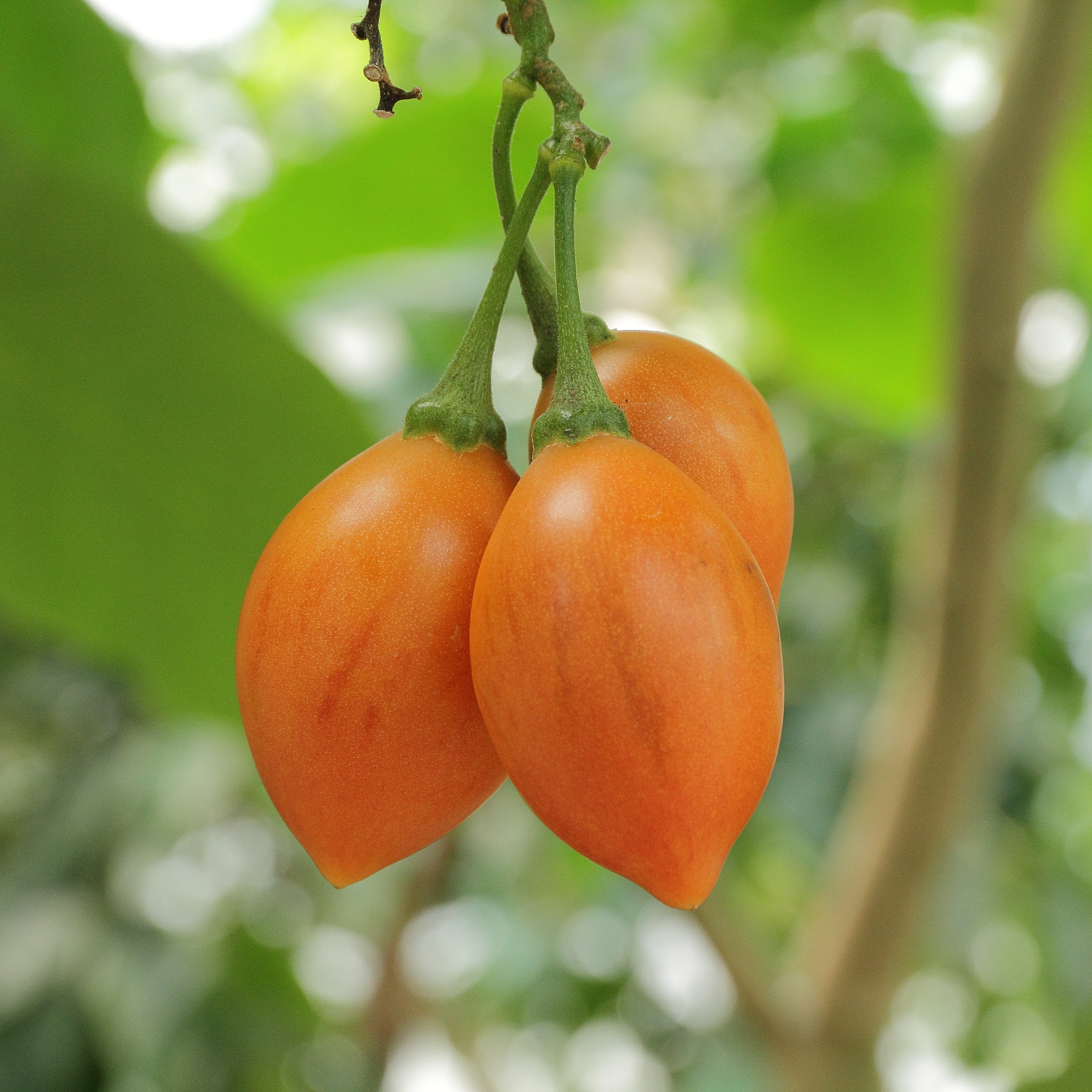

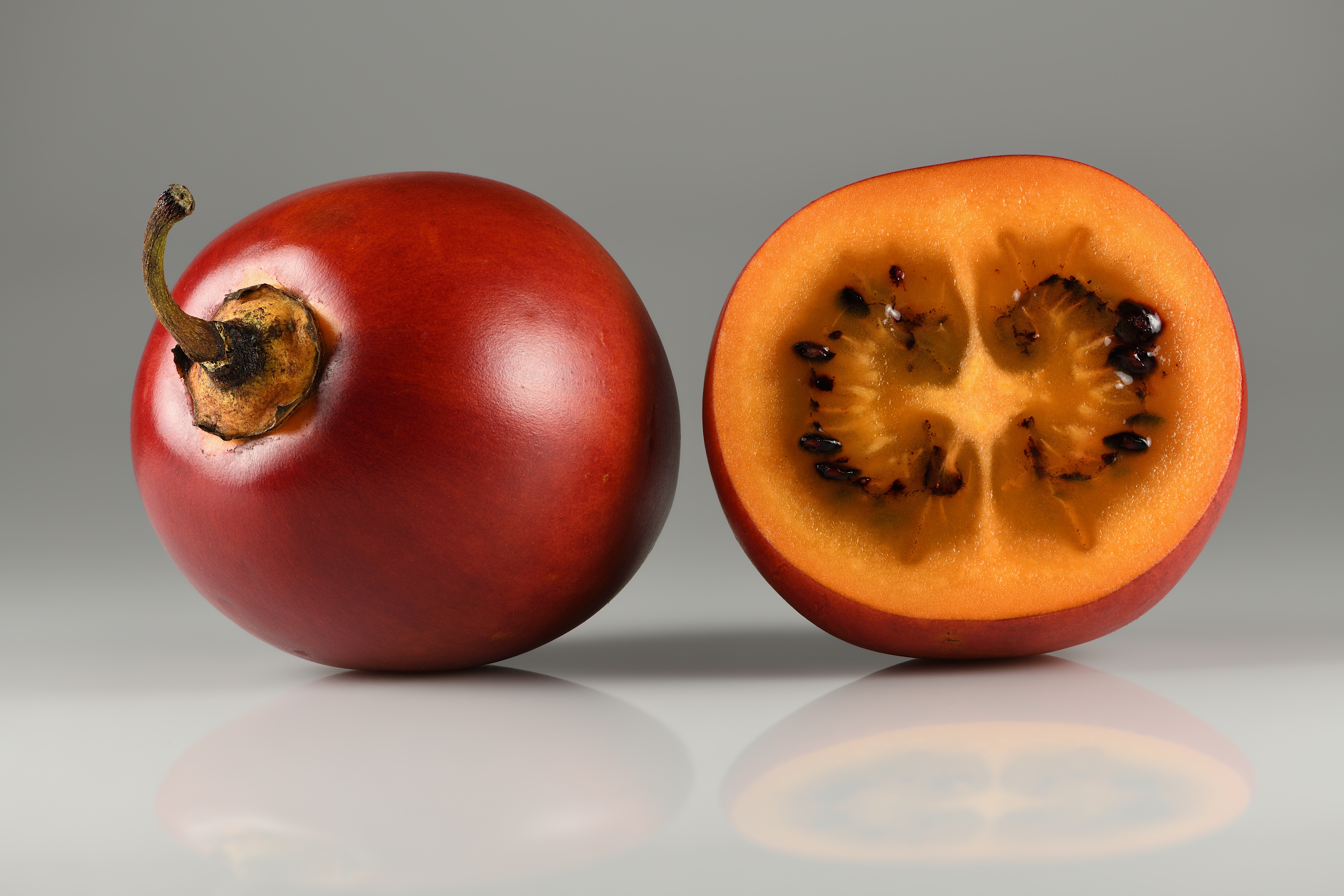

Scientific classification
- Kingdom: Plantae
- Clade: Tracheophytes
- Clade: Angiosperms
- Clade: Eudicots
- Clade: Asterids
- Order: Solanales
- Family: Solanaceae
- Genus: Solanum
- Species: S. betaceum

Binomial name
- Solanum betaceum Cav.

Synonyms
- Cyphomandra betacea (Cav.) Sendtn.; Cyphomandra crassifolia (Ortega) J.F. Macbr.; Pionandra betacea (Cav.) Miers; Solanum betacea Cav.; Solanum crassifolium Ortega; Solanum insigne Lowe

= Tamarillo =

Species of plant

The tamarillo (Solanum betaceum) is a tree or shrub in the flowering plant family Solanaceae (the nightshade family). It bears an egg-shaped edible fruit. It is common globally, especially in its native South America (as the Quechuan chilltu in Peru, Colombia, and Ecuador, or as tomate andino in other Andean countries), and has been introduced in New Zealand, Nepal, Rwanda, Burundi, the Democratic Republic of the Congo, Australia, Indonesia, Madeira and Bhutan.

== Naming ==
In 1966, the New Zealand Tree Tomato Promotions Council sought to coin a new name for the fruit, after growers suspected that the name 'tree tomato' was hindering export market potential for the crop, due to confusion around how the fruit was eaten and how similar it was to garden tomatoes. The council found none of the pre-existing names across South America to be suitable, wanting a name that sounded subtropical, appealing, and easy to pronounce and spell in different languages. The name tamarillo was proposed as a sort of pseudo-Hispanicism influenced by the name of the crop tomatillo (both related in the nightshade family), but with an added Māori (thus presentably 'native') element after Tama-te-kapua, captain of the Arawa migration canoe. Growers overwhelmingly voted for the change, and from February 1967 the name came into wide usage across New Zealand. The name 'tamarillo' is not universally used, and this plant has a different name in many regions.

It is also known as the tree tomato, tomate de árbol, tomate andino, tomate serrano, blood fruit, poor man's tomato, tomate de yuca, tomate de españa, sachatomate, berenjena, chilto (from Quechua: chilltu) and tamamoro in South America, tyamtar, rambheda or rukh tamatar (lit. tree tomatoes) in Nepal, and terong Belanda (Dutch eggplant) in Indonesia.

== Description ==
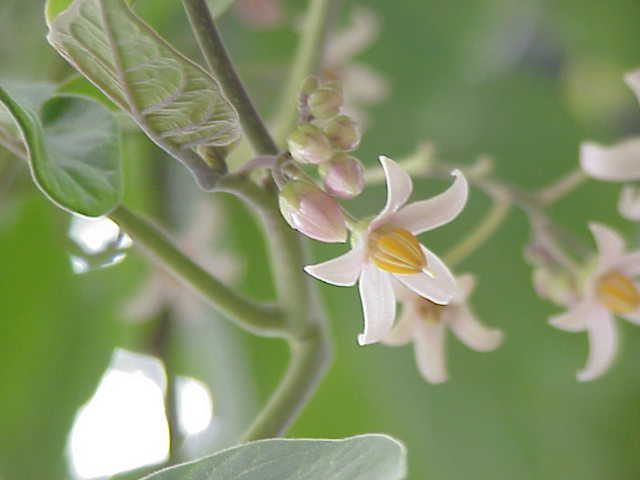
Flower cluster

The plant is a fast-growing tree that grows up to 5 metres (16 ft). Peak production is reached after 4 years, and the life expectancy is about 5 to 12 years. The tree usually forms a single upright trunk with lateral branches. The flowers and fruits hang from the lateral branches. The leaves are large, simple and perennial, and have a strong pungent smell.

The flowers are pink-white, and form clusters of 10 to 50 flowers. They produce 1 to 6 fruits per cluster. Plants can set fruit without cross-pollination, but the flowers are fragrant and attract insects. Cross-pollination seems to improve fruit set. The roots are shallow and not very pronounced, therefore the plant is not tolerant of drought stress and can be damaged by strong winds. Tamarillos will hybridize with many other solanaceae, though the hybrid fruits will be sterile, and unpalatable in some instances.

=== Fruit ===
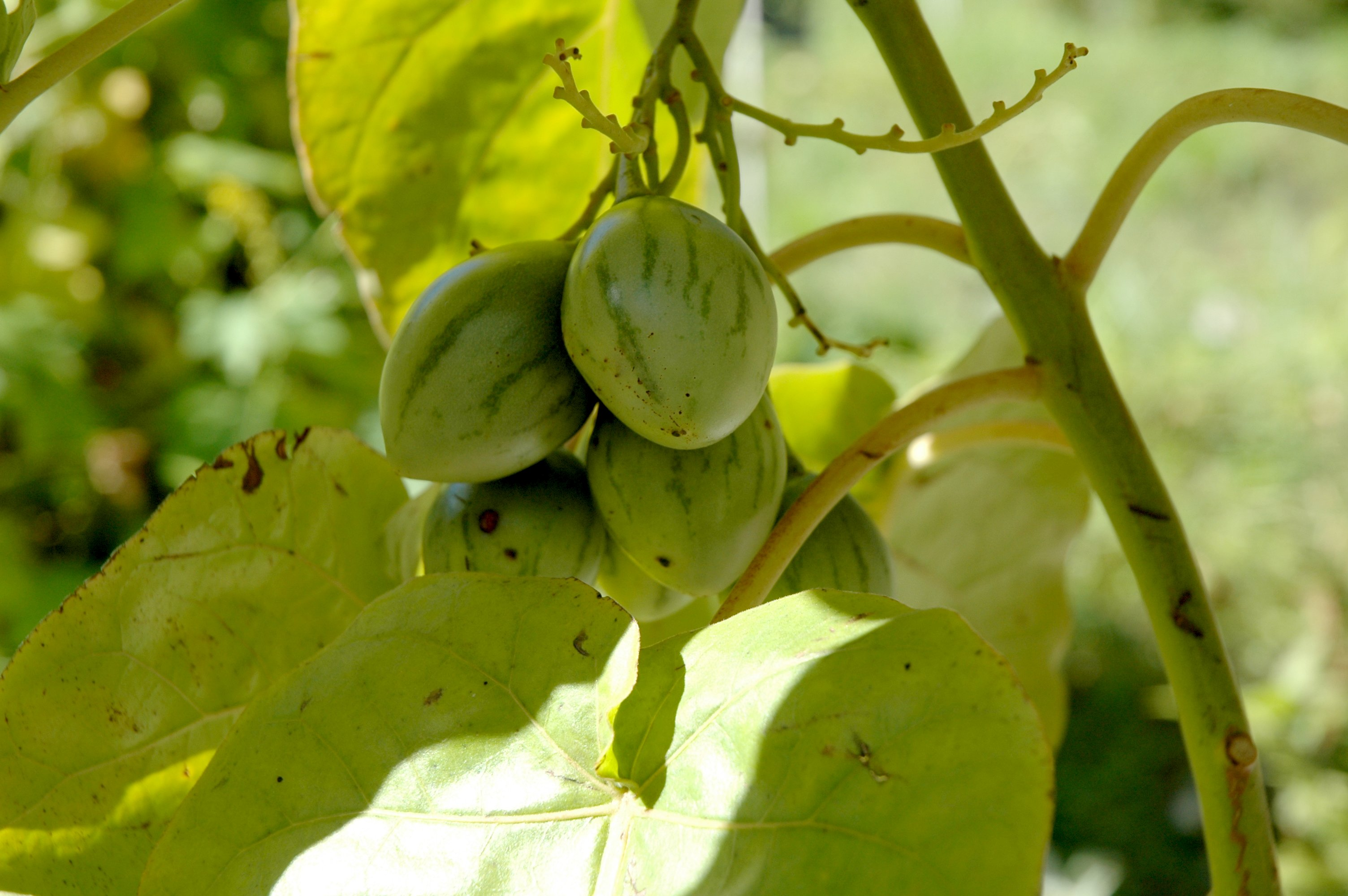
Unripe fruits

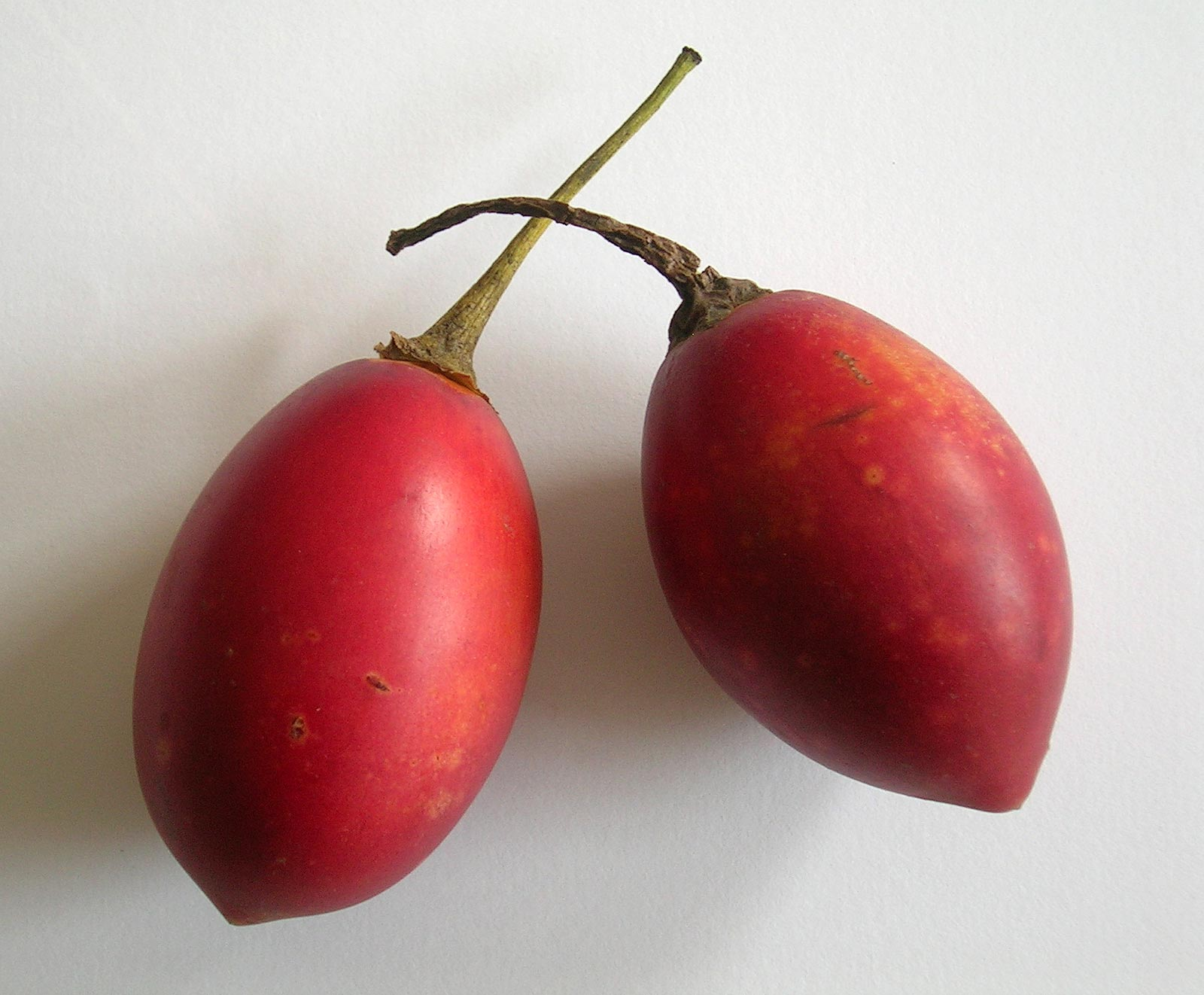
Ripe fruits

The fruits are egg-shaped and about 4–10 centimetres (1 1/2–4 in) long. Their color varies from yellow and orange to red and almost purple. Sometimes they have dark, longitudinal stripes. Red fruits are more sour, yellow and orange fruits are sweeter. The flesh has a firm texture and contains more and larger seeds than a common tomato. The fruits are very high in vitamins and iron and low in calories (only about 40 calories per fruit).

Fruit composition, some important components
Component [g/100g]	Range	Component [mg/100g]	Range
Water content	81–87	Vitamin A	0.32–1.48
Proteins	1.5–2.5	Vitamin C	19.7–57.8
Fat	0.05–1.28	Calcium	3.9–11.3
Fiber	1.4–6.0	Magnesium	19.7–22.3
Total acidity	1.0–2.4	Iron	0.4–0.94

== Origin and distribution ==
The tamarillo or chilltu is native to the Andes of Peru, Ecuador, Bolivia, Colombia, Argentina and Chile. Today it is still cultivated in gardens and small orchards for local production, and it is one of the most popular fruits in these regions. Other regions of cultivation are the subtropical areas throughout the world, such as Ethiopia, Burundi, Kenya, Rwanda, South Africa, Nepal, Hong Kong, China, Pakistan, the United States, Australia, Bhutan, New Zealand and Nagaland, Manipur, Darjeeling and Sikkim in India. It has also been seen in Cantabria, a province in Spain.

Tamarillos were first introduced to New Zealand in 1891, from seeds originating from India (which in turn were likely sourced from Jamaica). The plant, then known as the tree tomato, was popularly grown in home gardens, and small-scale commercial production began by the 1910s. Production peaked in New Zealand in the mid-1960s, declining in the 1970s onwards due to disease-related problems.

The tamarillo is a fruit harvested permanently in Colombia, the average annual production exceeds 150,000 tons. Antioquia has the largest number of hectares planted with La Meseta being the place where more than 900 hectares are located and from which the main cities of the country are supplied.

In 1993, in New Zealand, about 2,000 tons were produced on 200 hectares of land and exported to the United States. By 2020, there was a decrease from 150 after the discovery of the tomato potato psyllid (TPP) in 2006. This was reflected in a corresponding reduction in volume from 800 tonnes worth $3.5 million, to 250 tonnes valued at $1.3 million at that time. In 2021, growers sold 414 tonnes through the domestic wholesalers at a value of $3.1 million, and 8 tonnes exported to the US from two growers at a value of $0.02 million. For the export, the existing marketing channels developed for the kiwifruit are used.

The first internationally marketed crop of tamarillos in Australia was produced around 1996.

The tamarillo is also successfully grown at higher elevations of Malaysia and the Philippines, Ethiopia and in Puerto Rico. In the hot tropical lowlands, it develops only small fruits and fruit setting is seldom.

In Pakistan, tamarillo is cultivated on a limited experimental scale, mainly in cooler high-altitude regions such as Azad Kashmir and parts of northern Punjab.

== Cultivation ==
=== Soil and climate requirements ===
The tamarillo prefers a subtropical climate, with rainfall between 600 and 4000 millimeters and annual temperatures between 15 and 20 °C. It is intolerant to frost (below -2 °C) and drought stress. It is assumed that fruit set is affected by night temperatures. Areas where citrus are cultivated provide good conditions for tamarillos as well, such as in the Mediterranean climate. Tamarillo plants grow best in light, deep, fertile soils, although they are not very demanding. However, soils must be permeable since the plants are not tolerant of water-logging. They grow naturally on soils with a pH of 5 to 8.5.

=== Growth ===
Propagation is possible by both using seeds or cuttings. Seedlings first develop a straight, about 1.5 to 1.8 meters tall trunk, before they branch out. Propagation by seeds is easy and ideal in protected environments. However, in orchards with different cultivars, cross-pollination will occur and characteristics of the cultivars get mixed up. Seedlings should be kept in the nursery until they reach a height of 1 to 1.5 m as they are very frost-sensitive.

Plants grown from cuttings branch out earlier and result in more shrub-like plants that are more suitable for exposed sites. Cuttings should be made from basal and aerial shoots, and should be free of pathogenic viruses. Plants grown from cuttings should be kept in the nursery until they reach a height of 0.5 to 1 m.

The tree grows very quickly and is able to bear fruit after 1.5 to 2 years. The plant is daylength-insensitive. The fruits do not mature simultaneously, unless the tree has been pruned. A single tree can produce more than 20 kg of fruit per year; an orchard yields in 15 to 17 tons per hectare. One single mature tree in good soil will bear more fruit than a typical family can eat in about 3 months.

Tamarillos are suitable for growing as indoor container plants, though their swift growth, their light, water and humidity requirements and their large leaves can pose a challenge to those with limited space.

=== Plant management ===
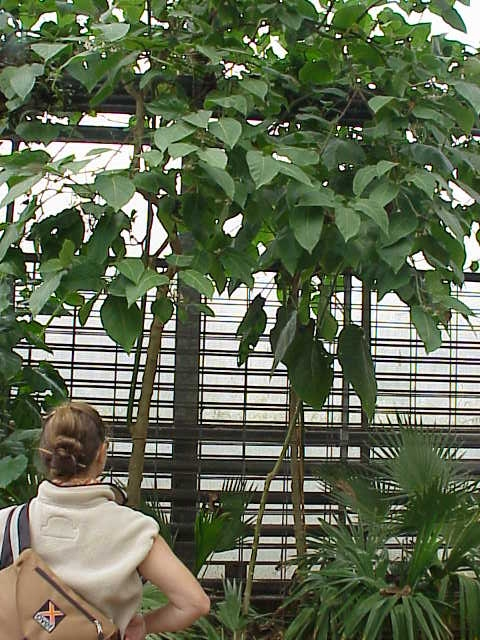
Tamarillo tree

The tamarillo trees are adaptable and very easy to grow. However, some plant management strategies can help to stabilize and improve plant performance.

==== Planting ====
Planting distances depend on the growing system. In New Zealand, with mechanized production, single row planting distances of 1 to 1.5 metres between plants and 4.5 to 5 metres between rows are recommended. In traditional growing regions such as the Andean region, plantations are much more dense, with 1.2 to 1.5 metres between plants. Dense planting can be a strategy to protect plants against wind. On poorly drained soils, plants should be planted on ridges.

==== Pruning ====
Pruning can help to control fruit size, plant size, harvest date and to simplify the harvesting of fruits. Cutting the tip of young plants leads to the desired branch height. Once the tree shape has been formed, pruning is reduced to the removal of old or dead wood and previously fruited branches, since branches that have already carried fruits will produce smaller fruits with lower quality the next time. Light pruning leads to medium-sized, heavy pruning to large-sized fruits. Basal shoots should be removed. When plants are grown in greenhouses, pruning prevents excessive vegetative growth.

When the tree is about 1 to 1.5 metres in height, it is advisable to cut the roots on one side and lean the tree to the other (in the direction of the midday sun at about 30 to 45 degrees). This allows fruiting branches to grow all along the trunk rather than just at the top.

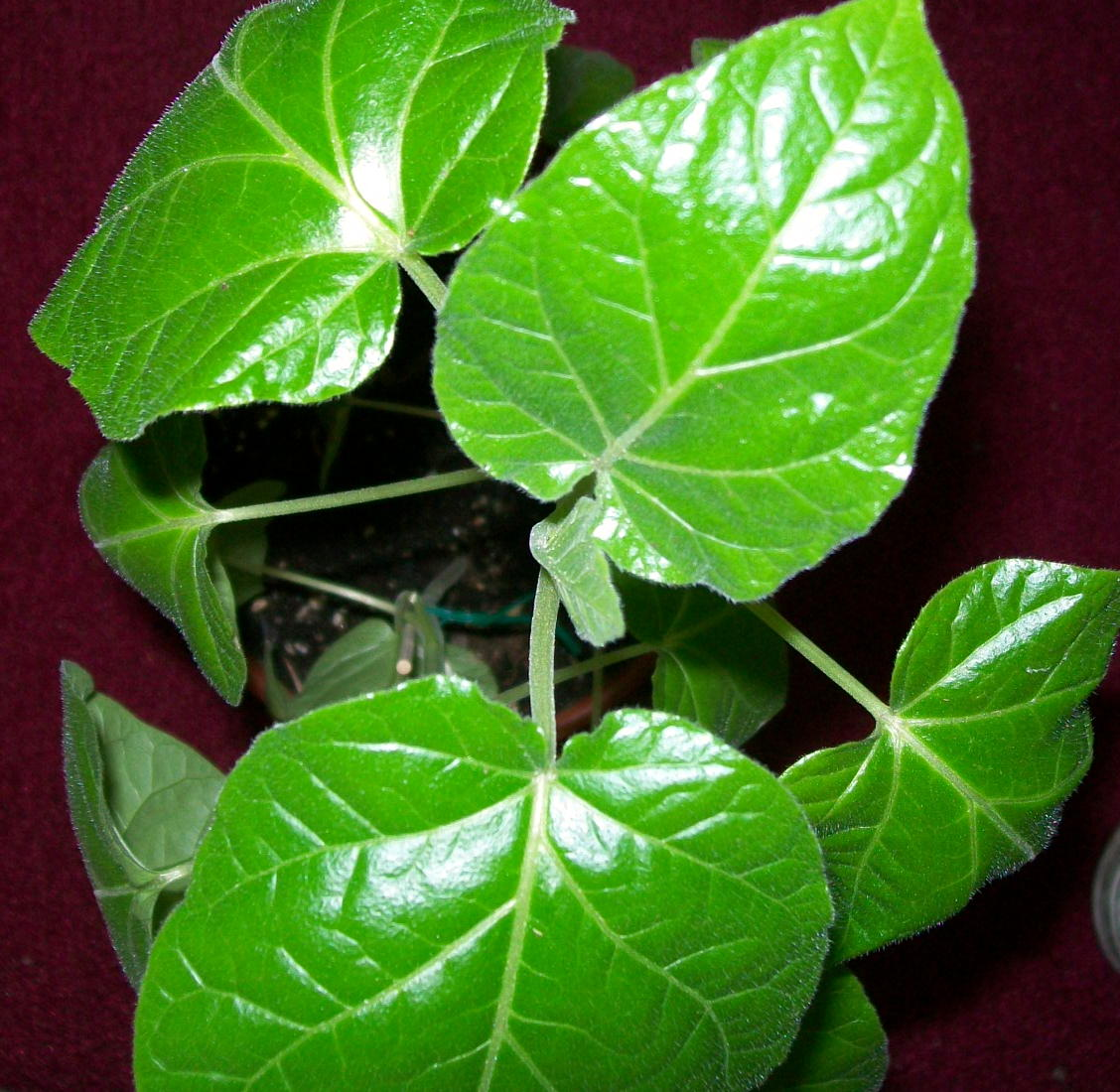
Tamarillo seedlings, 6 months old

==== Mulching ====
Since the plants are sensitive to drought stress, mulching can help to preserve moisture in the soil. It can also be a strategy to suppress weeds, as other soil management techniques, such as plowing, are not possible due to the shallow and sensitive root system.

==== Shelter ====
The plants have to be protected from wind. Their shallow root system does not provide enough stability, and the lateral branches are fragile and break easily when carrying fruits.

==== Irrigation and fertilization ====
To maximize and stabilize production, water and nutrient inputs should be provided when needed. The plants need continuous supply of water due to their shallow root system. Drought stress results in a decrease of plant growth, fruit size and productivity. Recommended fertilizer rates per hectare are 170 kg of nitrogen, 45 kg of phosphorus and 130 to 190 kg of potassium for intensive New Zealand production systems. Phosphorus and potassium are applied in the beginning of the season; nitrogen applications are distributed throughout the year.

==== Pest management ====
The tamarillo tree is, compared to similar crops such as tomatoes, quite resistant to pests in general. Still, to reduce risk in intensive production systems, some pests have to be controlled to avoid major crop damage. To control pests, the same control methods as for other Solanaceae can be used.

Pests	Further Information	Examples
Viruses	Most significant diseases at many production sites; Reduce tree's vigour and yield; Leave scabs on fruits and therefore lower fruit quality	Tamarillo mosaic virus (TaMV)
Nematodes	Only a few nematodes have been found; Serious damage on young trees; Can be vectors of viruses	Meloidogyne incognita, M. javanica and M. hapla
Insects	Can be vectors of viruses; Feed on the fruits and other parts of the plant	Aphids, greenhouse whitefly, tomato worm
Fungi	Leaf loss (defoliation)	Powdery mildew

=== Harvest ===
Ripening of fruits is not simultaneous. Several harvests are necessary. In climates with little annual variation, tamarillo trees can flower and set fruit throughout the year. In climates with pronounced seasons (such as New Zealand), fruits ripen in autumn. Premature harvest and ethylene induced ripening in controlled-atmosphere chambers is possible with minimal loss of fruit quality. The fragile lateral branches can break easily when loaded with fruits, so premature harvest helps to reduce this risk and allows storage of fruits up to 20 days at room temperature. A cold-water dipping process, developed by the New Zealand Department of Scientific and Industrial Research also allows further storage of 6–10 weeks.

=== Prospects ===
Research and breeding should improve plantation management, fruit quality and postharvest treatment. A better understanding of plant physiology, nutritional requirements of plants and fruit set mechanisms will help to improve growing systems. Breeding goals are to break seed dormancy, to improve sweetness of fruits and to increase yield. For industrial uses, little "stones" of sodium and calcium that occasionally appear in the fruit skin form a problem. Those stones have to be eliminated by breeding.

== Uses ==
=== Culinary ===
The fruit is eaten by scooping the flesh from a halved fruit. When lightly sugared and chilled, the flesh is used for a breakfast dish. Some people in New Zealand cut the fruit in half, scoop out the pulpy flesh and spread it on toast. Yellow-fruited cultivars have a sweeter flavor, occasionally compared to mango or apricot. The red-fruited variety, which is much more widely cultivated, is more tart, and the savory aftertaste is far more pronounced. In the Northern Hemisphere, tamarillos are most frequently available from July until November, and fruits early in the season tend to be sweeter and less astringent.

In the highlands of Ecuador, yellow tamarillos are used in ceviche and condiments, and the red varieties for desserts. The hydroethanolic extract of the purple variety seeds has been found to be genotoxic, so macerations should only be done with the pulp.

They can be made into compotes, or added to hollandaise, chutneys and curries. Desserts using this fruit include bavarois and, combined with apples, a strudel.

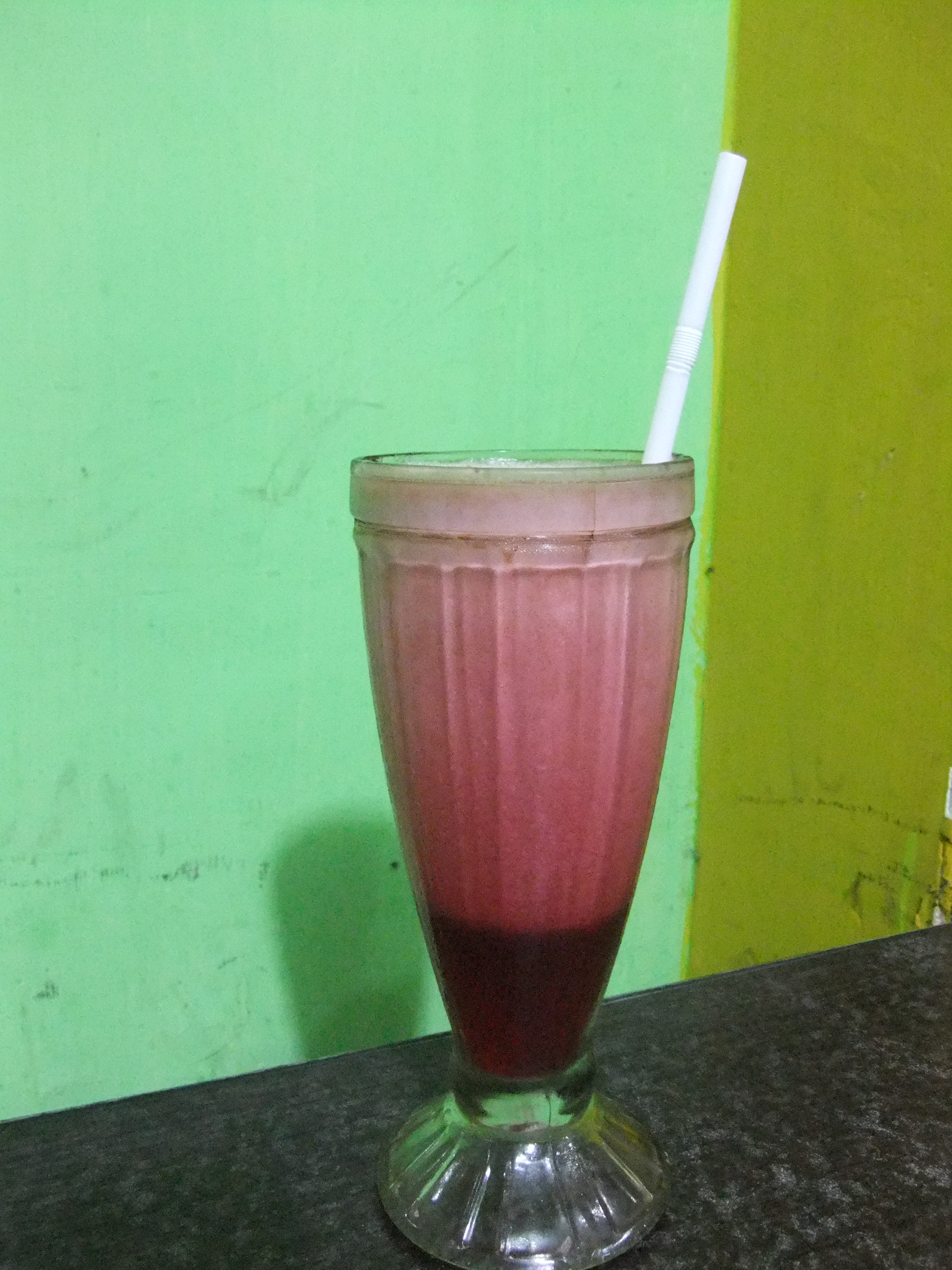
Jus terong belanda, tamarillo juice consumed in Indonesia

In Colombia, Ecuador, Panama, Venezuela, and parts of Indonesia (including Sumatra and Sulawesi), fresh tamarillos are frequently blended together with water and sugar to make a juice. It is also available as a commercially pasteurized purée.

In Nepal, a version of the South American fruit is very popular. It is typically consumed as a chutney or a pickle during the autumn and winter months. It is known as Tyamtar and Ram Bheda. The fruit is boiled or roasted in open fire till the skin breaks and then mashed with chillies, timur, garlic and other spices of choice. Similar to Nepal, the Indian regions of Ooty, Darjeeling and Sikkim also consume Tamarillo. In Northeast India, it is roasted and chutneys are made with it by blending roasted or fried dried or fermented fish, chillies and garlic. In Ecuador, the tamarillo, known as tomate de árbol, is blended with chili peppers to make a hot sauce commonly consumed with local dishes of the Andean region. The sauce is simply referred to as ají and is present at a wide variety of meals in Ecuador.

In Rwanda, tree tomatoes are often served alongside other tropical fruits, such as mango and pineapple.

In Yunnan, China, the Dai people make a tamarillo nanpie, a sauce like dish made with roasted tamarillo, sawtooth coriander, chillies and garlic.

The flesh of the tamarillo is tangy and sweet, with a complex flavor, and may be compared to kiwifruit, tomato, guava, or passion fruit. The skin and the flesh near it have a bitter taste and are not usually eaten raw.

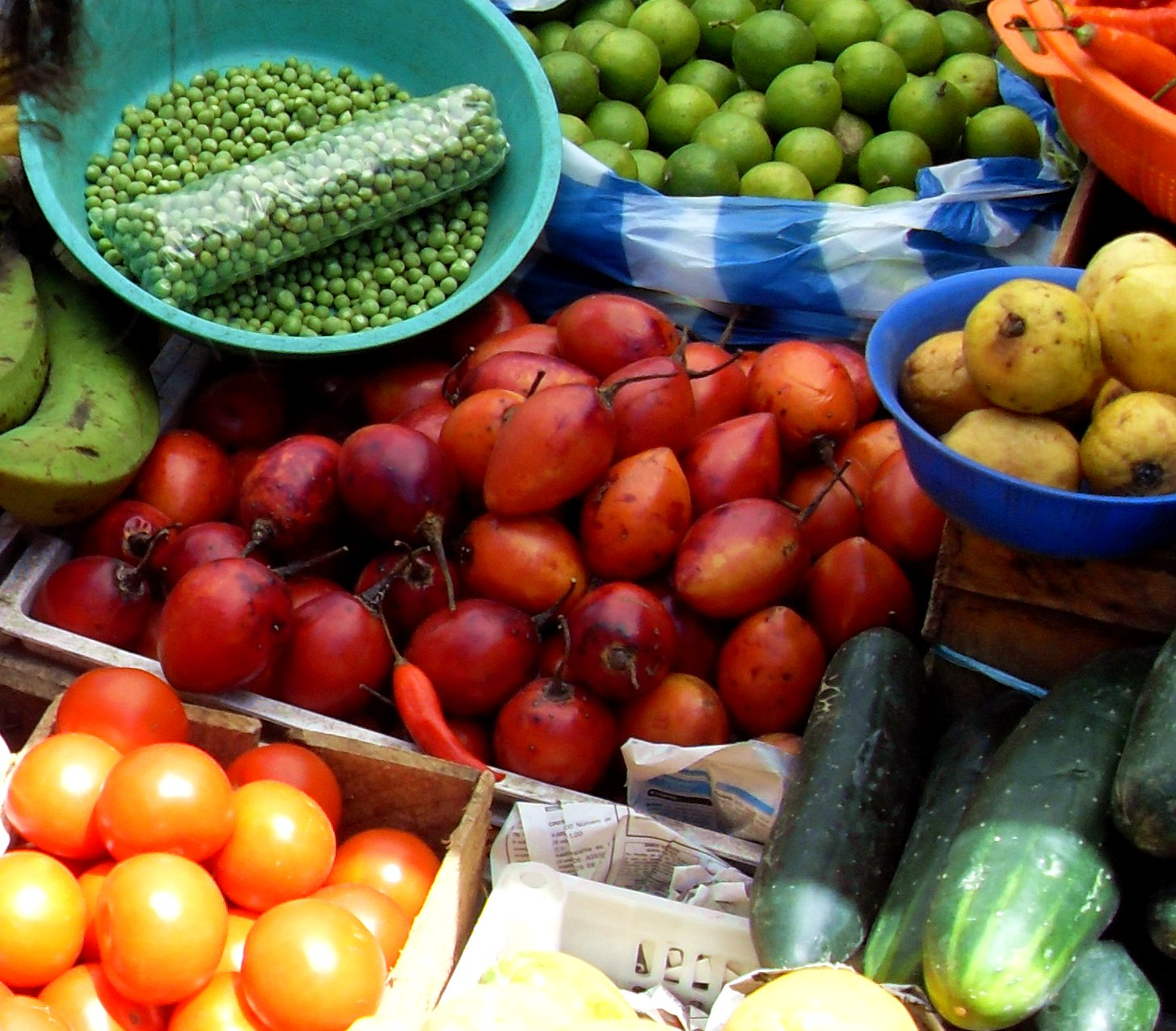

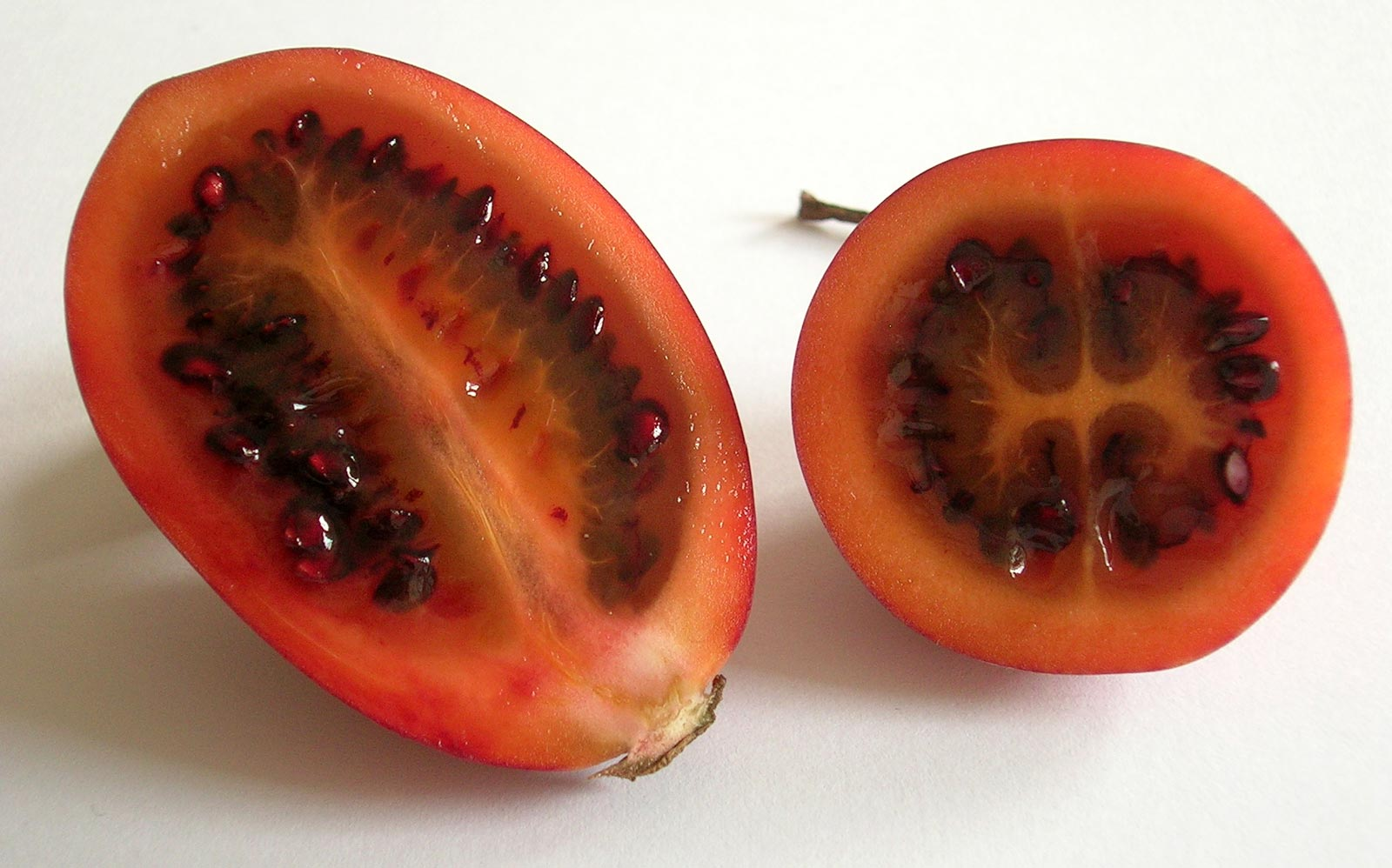

The tamarillo has been described as having a taste similar to that of a passion fruit and a piquant tomato combined.

The red and purple types of fruits are preferred in import countries of Europe: even though they taste more acidic, their color is favoured by consumers.

=== Industrial ===
The fruits are high in pectin and therefore have good properties for preserves. However, they oxidize and lose color when not treated. Yellow fruit types are better suited to industrial use.

== In culture ==
Tamarillo is known as "Naga tree tomato" in Nagaland, and it is registered under the Geographical Indications (GI) of Nagaland by Government of India. It is locally called si binyano or khwüdi.
