= Solanum cajanumense =

Conservation status
- Near Threatened (IUCN 2.3)

Scientific classification
- Kingdom: Plantae
- Clade: Tracheophytes
- Clade: Angiosperms
- Clade: Eudicots
- Clade: Asterids
- Order: Solanales
- Family: Solanaceae
- Genus: Solanum
- Species: S. cajanumense

Binomial name
- Solanum cajanumense Kunth

Species of flowering plant

Solanum cajanumense (also known as casana) is a species of plant in the family Solanaceae. It is found in Colombia, Ecuador, and Peru.

Intolerant of heat, frost, or direct sunlight, Solanum cajanumense seems to prefer cloud forest-type growing conditions, which limits its future agricultural potential. As with most solanaceae, most parts of the plant are toxic, but casana produces an edible, yellow fruit similar in appearance to, but smaller than the closely related tamarillo.

An attempt at commercial cultivation was made in New Zealand in the 1980s, though an overall lack of selective breeding, the unpredictability of fruit flavor (usually very sweet, but sometimes sour or bitter), the somewhat delicate nature of this shade-loving plant, and an attractiveness to pests like aphids, white flies and spider mites all caused those domestication efforts to fail. On rare occasions, it is encountered as a dooryard fruit tree.
