= Hispanicisms in English =

English words or phrases originating from Spanish

Hispanicisms in English are words or phrases from Spanish influence on English. For a number of historical, political and cultural reasons, Hispanicisms in English are less widespread than anglicisms in Spanish. Nevertheless, they are very notable in certain areas of the United States, such as the U.S.-Mexican border, Southern Florida, and certain neighborhoods of large cities in the Northeast.

Over the centuries Spanish has made many lexical contributions to English, and continues to do so. Some of these contributions have been directly from Spanish words, and in other cases Spanish has served as the conduit for words which originated in other languages with a special relationship to Spanish, such as Arabic and the Indian languages of the New World. Things and customs which originated in the Spanish-speaking world, (such as bullfighting, typical dances, special foods) are also obvious generators of Hispanicisms in English. Some words have special historical significance, such as "guerrilla" (the word used by Napoleon's forces to describe the way the Spanish fought in the Peninsular War), or the term "fifth column" which as quinta columna was used by a Spanish Civil War general to label his covert supporters in Madrid as he laid siege to it. Many geographic place names in the United States have Spanish origins as a legacy of the time when these regions were under Spanish or Mexican control, or as indicators that Hispanic explorers passed that way. Pei notes, for example that three dangerous rocks on the Alaskan coast bear the names Abreojo, Alárgate, and Quita Sueño.
