= Mary Bucholtz =

American linguist

- Born: 29 October 1966 (age 59)

Academic background
- Education: UC Berkeley

Academic work
- Institutions: UC Santa Barbara
- Main interests: Sociocultural linguistics
- Notable works: Language and woman's place: text and commentaries
- Notable ideas: Tactics of intersubjectivity
- Website: http://www.linguistics.ucsb.edu/faculty/bucholtz/

Mary Bucholtz (born 29 October 1966) is a professor of linguistics at UC Santa Barbara. Bucholtz's work focuses largely on language use in the United States, and specifically on issues of language and youth; language, gender, and sexuality; African American English; and Mexican and Chicano Spanish.

== Biography ==
Bucholtz received a B.A. in Classics from Grinnell College in 1990 and an M.A. and Ph.D. in linguistics from UC Berkeley in 1992 and 1997 under the supervision of Robin Lakoff.

At UC Santa Barbara, where she has worked as an assistant professor (2002–2004), an associate professor (2004–2008) and a full professor (2008–present), Bucholtz is affiliated with several departments, including the anthropology, the feminist studies, Spanish and Portuguese, as well as the Gevirtz Graduate School of Education, the comparative literature program, and the Latin American and Iberian studies program. She held academic positions at Stanford and Texas A&M before joining the faculty of UC Santa Barbara.

Since 2011, she has also directed the Center for California Languages and Cultures within UC Santa Barbara's Institute for Social, Behavioral, and Economic Research. Through her work at the Center for California Languages and Cultures, Bucholtz has been the director (2009–2017) and associate director (2017–present) of a community partnership program, School Kids Investigating Language in Life + Society (SKILLS), which provides linguistics research opportunities to students enrolled in Santa Barbara high schools.

== Honors and distinctions ==
Bucholtz has been an editorial board member for several journals. She served as series editor for Studies in Language and Gender from 1998 to 2013, editor of the Journal of Linguistic Anthropology from 2002 to 2004, and an editorial board member of Language in Society (2005–2012), Gender and Language (2005–2014), Journal of Sociolinguistics (2007–2011), American Anthropologist (2008–2012), and Text and Talk (2011–2014). She still serves as an editorial board member of the Journal of Linguistic Anthropology (from 1999 to 2001 and since 2005), Visual Communication (since 2004), the International Journal on Research in Critical Discourse Analysis (since 2005), Language and Linguistics Compass (since 2006), American Speech (since 2008), Research on Language and Social Interaction (since 2009), Pragmatics and Society (since 2009), and Discourse, Context, and Media (since 2011). She has also been an advisory board member for Gender and Language since 2014.

From 2000 to 2001, Bucholtz was appointed as the chair of the Nominations Committee of the Society for Linguistic Anthropology. She was also elected to serve as an advisory council member and co-chair for the International Gender and Language Association from 2000 to 2004.

Bucholtz was recognized in 2014 by the Society for Linguistic Anthropology with the Award for Public Outreach and Community Service.

In 2020, Bucholtz was inducted as a Fellow of the Linguistic Society of America.

== Research & work ==
As a sociocultural linguist, Bucholtz has focused on researching how language is used in interactional contexts to create identity and culture and contribute to issues of social power. She is well known for her contributions to research on language and identity within sociocultural linguistics, and especially the tactics of intersubjectivity framework developed with Kira Hall.

=== Language and youth ===
In the late 1990s, Bucholtz began ethnographic work on the ways adolescents and pre-adolescents construct identity. Her research extended the work of Penelope Eckert, who identified three adolescent social categories (jocks, burnouts, and in-betweens) concerned with pursuing "coolness." From 1994 to 1996, Bucholtz studied another social category, "nerds," using a California high school in the San Francisco Bay Area as her field site. She initially presented her work on nerd girls at the 1997 International Conference on Language and Social Psychology. Bucholtz positions the "nerd" as a separate and distinct community of practice set in opposition to the burnouts, jocks, and in-betweens: nerds purposely reject the burnouts', jocks', and in-betweens' pursuit of "coolness" and instead prioritize knowledge and individuality.

Bucholtz uses the concepts of positive identity practices (linguistic and social behaviors that confirm and reflect an intragroup identity) and negative identity practices (linguistic and social behaviors that distance individuals from other groups) to show how nerds construct their community of practice. Her research suggests that the nerd identity is "hyperwhite," characterized linguistically by more infrequent use of valley girl speech and slang than other social categories; by a preference for Greco-Latinate over Germanic words; by the use of the discourse practice of punning; and by adherence to conventions of "super-standard English," or excessively formal English. Additionally, Bucholtz found that the speech of nerds often included avoidance of consonant-cluster simplification and phonological reduction of unstressed vowels as is common in colloquial speech as well as careful and precise enunciation and reading style speech (wherein nerds pronounce words more closely to how they're spelled). She proposes that these linguistic practices and features are used to establish the nerds' intragroup identity marker of intelligence.

== Selected bibliography ==
=== Books ===
- Bucholtz, Mary; Hall, Kira (1995) [1975]. Gender articulated: language and the socially constructed self. New York: Routledge. ISBN 9780415913997.
- Bucholtz, Mary; Liang, A.C.; Sutton, Laurel A. (1999). Reinventing identities the gendered self in discourse. Studies in Language and Gender. New York: Oxford University Press. ISBN 9780195126303.
- Lakoff, Robin (2004). Bucholtz, Mary (ed.). Language and woman's place: text and commentaries. New York: Oxford University Press. ISBN 9780195167573.
- Bucholtz, Mary (2011). White kids: language, race and styles of youth identity. Cambridge: Cambridge University Press. ISBN 9780521871495.

=== Book chapters ===
- Bucholtz, Mary; Hall, Kira (1995) [1975], "Introduction: Twenty years after Language and Woman's Place", in Bucholtz, Mary; Hall, Kira (eds.), Gender articulated: language and the socially constructed self, New York: Routledge, pp. 1–24, ISBN 9780415913997. Pdf.
- Bucholtz, Mary; Hall, Kira (1995), "From Mulatta to Mestiza: Passing and the linguistic reshaping of ethnic identity", in Bucholtz, Mary; Hall, Kira (eds.), Gender articulated: language and the socially constructed self, New York: Routledge, pp. 351–374, ISBN 9780415913997. Pdf.
- Bucholtz, Mary (1999), "Bad examples: transgression and progress in language and gender studies", in Bucholtz, Mary; Liang, A.C.; Sutton, Laurel A. (eds.), Reinventing identities the gendered self in discourse, Studies in Language and Gender, New York: Oxford University Press, pp. 3–26, ISBN 9780195126303.
- Bucholtz, Mary (1999), "Purchasing power: the gender and class imaginary on the shopping channel", in Bucholtz, Mary; Liang, A.C.; Sutton, Laurel A. (eds.), Reinventing identities the gendered self in discourse, Studies in Language and Gender, New York: Oxford University Press, pp. 348–268, ISBN 9780195126303.
- Bucholtz, Mary (2004), "Changing places: Language and Woman's Place in context", in Bucholtz, Mary; Lakoff, Robin (eds.), Language and woman's place: text and commentaries, New York: Oxford University Press, pp. 121–128, ISBN 9780195167573 Pdf.
- Bucholtz, Mary (2014), "The feminist foundations of language, gender, and sexuality research", in Ehrlich, Susan; Meyerhoff, Miriam; Holmes, Janet (eds.), The handbook of language, gender, and sexuality (2nd ed.), Chichester, West Sussex: Wiley-Blackwell, pp. 23–47, ISBN 9780470656426.

=== Journal articles ===
- Bucholtz, Mary (April 1999). ""Why be normal?": Language and identity practices in a community of nerd girls". Language in Society. 28 (2): 203–223. doi:10.1017/s0047404599002043. Pdf.
- Bucholtz, Mary (June 1999). "Gender". Journal of Linguistic Anthropology. 9 (1–2): 80–83. doi:10.1525/jlin.1999.9.1-2.80. Pdf.
- Bucholtz, Mary (November 1999). "You da man: Narrating the racial other in the production of white masculinity". Journal of Sociolinguistics. 3 (4): 443–460. doi:10.1111/1467-9481.00090. Pdf.
- Bucholtz, Mary; Trechter, Sara (June 2001). "Introduction: White noise: bringing language into whiteness studies". Journal of Linguistic Anthropology. 11 (1): 3–21. doi:10.1525/jlin.2001.11.1.3. Pdf.
- Bucholtz, Mary; Hall, Kira (October 2005). "Identity and interaction: a sociocultural linguistic approach". Discourse Studies. 7 (4–5): 585–614. doi:10.1177/1461445605054407. S2CID 27020925. Pdf.
- Bucholtz, Mary (July 2011). "Race and the re-embodied voice in Hollywood film". Language & Communication. 31 (3): 255–265. doi:10.1016/j.langcom.2011.02.004. Pdf.
- Bucholtz, Mary (July 2011). ""It's different for guys": Gendered narratives of racial conflict among white California youth". Discourse & Society. 22 (4): 385–402. doi:10.1177/0957926510395832. S2CID 145109978. Pdf.
- Bucholtz, Mary; Lopez, Qiuana (November 2011). "Performing blackness, forming whiteness: Linguistic minstrelsy in Hollywood film". Journal of Sociolinguistics. 15 (5): 680–706. doi:10.1111/j.1467-9841.2011.00513.x. S2CID 59951184. Pdf.
