= Susan Ehrlich =

Canadian linguist

Academic background
- Education: York University (BA); University of Toronto (MA, PhD)

Academic work
- Discipline: Linguist
- Sub-discipline: Discourse analysis
- Institutions: York University
- Main interests: Language and gender, forensic linguistics

Susan Lynn Ehrlich is a Canadian linguist known for her work in both language and gender, language and the law, and the intersections between them. She studies language, gender and the law, with a focus on consent and coercion in rape trials.

== Education and professional career ==
Ehrlich received an Honours Bachelor of Arts in English from York University, and both a master's degree and a Ph.D. in linguistics from the University of Toronto. Her PhD was awarded in 1986, for a dissertation entitled: A Linguistic Analysis of Point of View in Fiction. Between 1983 and 1986 she held lecturer positions at the University of Toronto, Brock University, and York University.

In 1986, she joined York University's Department of Languages Literatures and Linguistics as a sessional faculty member. Between 1988 and 1990 she held this same position on a full-time basis as an assistant professor. In 1990, she became an associate professor at York University and obtained full professorship in 1999.

Ehrlich has served as a visiting scholar at the University of California at Berkeley's linguistics department, between January and May 1992; a visiting professor at the Netherlands Graduate School of Linguistics Summer Institute (LOT), in June 1997; and a visiting professor at the Summer School in Sociolinguistics at the University of Edinburgh, in June 2010.

== Editorial and professional service positions ==
Ehrlich was an area editor for the International Encyclopedia of Human Sexuality in 2015 and has served as a member of the editorial board for Gender and Language since 2005 and Discourse & Society since 1999. Since 2020 she has been the co-editor of Language in Society with Tommaso Milani. She served as a member of the executive committee of the Social and Political Concerns Committee for the Linguistic Society of America between the years of 2002–2004 and 2008–2009 and chaired the committee between 2009–2010. Additionally, she served as the secretary for the executive committee of the International Gender and Language Association, between 2005–2006.

Between 1996 and 2004 she served as the linguistics representative for the Canadian Federation for the Humanities, Aid to Scholarly Publication Programme. She has also served as an expert witness for the Canadian Human Rights Commission in 1992, 1993, and 1996, as well as for EGAL (Equality for Gays and Lesbians) in 2001.

== Work ==
Much of Ehrlich's recent work utilizes feminist discourse analysis to deconstruct the language of rape, sexual harassment, and sexual assault, often in the legal system. Her work seeks to identify the underlying prejudices within the language of the legal system, particularly in cases of sexual assault and sexual harassment where linguistic evidence is often the only available evidence and serves to not only describe events, but build or destroy the character of the perpetrator and victim.

== Selected publications ==
=== Books ===
- (1990) Point of View: A Linguistic Analysis of Literary Style. London: Routledge.
- (1992) with Peter Avery. Teaching American English Pronunciation. Oxford: Oxford University Press.
- (2001) Representing Rape: Language and Sexual Consent. London: Routledge.

=== Edited books ===
- (2008) Language and Gender: Major Themes in English Studies. (a four-volume collection of articles on Language and Gender) London: Routledge.
- (2010) with Alice Freed. 'Why do you ask': The Function of Questions in Institutional Discourse. New York: Oxford University Press.
- (2014) with Miriam Meyerhoff and Janet Holmes. The Handbook of Language and Gender, Second Edition. Oxford: Wiley Blackwell.
- (forthcoming) with Diana Eades and Janet Ainsworth. Coercion and Consent in the Legal Process: Linguistic and Discursive Perspectives. New York: Oxford University Press.

=== Selected book chapters and articles ===
- (2006) with J. Sidnell. “’That’s not an assumption I think you ought to make’: Challenging Presuppositions in Inquiry Testimony.” Language in Society 35: 655–676.
- (2007) “Legal Discourse and the Cultural Intelligibility of Gendered Meanings.” Journal of Sociolinguistics 11: 452–477.
- (2007) “Normative Discourses and Representations of Coerced Sex.” In J. Cotterill (ed.) The Language of Sexual Crime (pp. 126–138). London: Palgrave Macmillan.
- (2008) “Sexual Assault Trials, Discursive Identities and Institutional Change.” In Rosana Dolon and Julia Todoli (eds.) Analyzing Identities in Discourse. (pp. 159–177). Amsterdam: John Benjamins Publishing Company.
- (2010) “Rape Victims in the Legal System.” In Malcolm Coulthard and Alison Johnson (eds.) Routledge Handbook of Forensic Linguistics. (pp. 265–280). London: Routledge.
- (2010) “Courtroom Discourse.” In Ruth Wodak, Barbara Johnstone and Paul Kerswill (eds.) Sage Handbook of Sociolinguistics. (pp. 361–374). London: Sage.
- (2011) with S. Levesque. “The Strategic Marginalization of Working-Class Masculinity in a Batterers’ Treatment Program.” International Gender and Language Journal 5: 271–301.
- (2012) “Perpetuating – and Resisting – Rape Myths in Trial Discourse” In Elizabeth Sheehy (ed.) Sexual Assault Law, Practice and Activism in a Post-Jane Doe Era. (pp. 407–426). Ottawa: University of Ottawa Press.
- (2012) “Text Trajectories, Legal Discourse and Gendered Inequalities.” Applied Linguistics Review 3: 47–73.
- (2013) with Tanya Romaniuk. “On the Interactional Import of Self-Repair in the Courtroom” In Makoto Hayashi, Geoffrey Raymond & Jack Sidnell (eds.) Conversational Repair and Human Understanding. (pp. 172–197). Cambridge: Cambridge University Press.
- (2013) “Post-Penetration Rape and the Decontextualization of Witness Testimony” In John Conley, Chris Heffer and Frances Rock (eds.) Legal-Lay Communication: Textual Travels in the Law. (pp. 189–205). Oxford: Oxford University Press.
- (2013) “Ethical Dilemmas in Sociolinguistic Data Collection” In Christine Mallinson, Becky Childs and Gerard van Herk (eds.) Data Collection in Sociolinguistic Methods and Applications. (pp. 54–57). New York: Routledge.
- (2014) with Tanya Romaniuk. “Discourse Analysis” In Robert Podesva and Devanyi Sharma (eds.) Research Methods in Linguistics. (pp. 466–499). Cambridge: Cambridge University Press.
- (2014) "Language, Gender and Sexual Violence: Legal Perspective" In Susan Ehrlich, Miriam Meyerhoff and Janet Holmes (eds.) The Handbook of Language, Gender, and Sexuality, 2nd edition. (pp. 452–470) Oxford: Wiley Blackwell.
- (2014) with Miriam Meyerhoff "Introduction: Language, Gender and Sexuality" In Susan Ehrlich, Miriam Meyerhoff and Janet Holmes (eds.) The Handbook of Language, Gender, and Sexuality, 2nd edition. (pp. 1–20) Oxford: Wiley Blackwell.
- (2015) "Language of Sexual Violence." The International Encyclopedia of Human Sexuality. Oxford: Wiley Blackwell.
- (2015) "Narratives, Institutional Processes and Gendered Inequalitites." In Anna de Fina and Alexandra Georgakopoulou (eds.) The Handbook of Narrative Analysis. (pp. 293–310) Oxford: Wiley Blackwell.
