= Lal Zimman =

American transgender linguist

- Title: Associate Professor
- Awards: Ruth Benedict Prize

Academic background
- Education: San Francisco State University (BA, MA); University of Colorado Boulder (PhD)
- Thesis: Voices in Transition: Testosterone, Transmasculinity, and the Gendered Voice among Female-to-Male Transgender People
- Doctoral advisor: Kira Hall

Academic work
- Discipline: Linguistics
- Sub-discipline: Transgender linguistics, sociolinguistics, linguistic anthropology, sociophonetics
- Institutions: University of California, Santa Barbara, Stanford University, Reed College
- Website: lalzimman.org

Lal Zimman is an American linguist who works on sociocultural linguistics, sociophonetics, language, gender and identity, and transgender linguistics.

== Education ==
Zimman received his BA in Philosophy and MA in English with a Linguistics concentration from San Francisco State University. He received his PhD in linguistics from University of Colorado Boulder in 2012 where he worked under Kira Hall. His dissertation, Voices in Transition: Testosterone, Transmasculinity, and the Gendered Voice among Female-to-Male Transgender People, used both ethnographic and sociophonetic methods to explore the effects of hormone therapy on the voices of trans men.

== Career ==
Zimman's work has been influential in developing the field of trans linguistics. He has been widely recognized for his work on inclusive language reform and activism, the relationship between the body, biological sex, and the voice, and pronouns and singular they.

Zimman is currently assistant professor of Linguistics & Affiliated Faculty in Feminist Studies, University of California, Santa Barbara. He is also General Editor for Studies in Language, Gender, and Sexuality for Oxford University Press.

In 2014, Zimman published a co-edited volume, Queer Excursions: Retheorizing Binaries in Language, Gender, and Sexuality (published by Oxford University Press), which won the Association for Queer Anthropology's Ruth Benedict Prize.

He has taught several classes on Sociocultural Linguistics, Language, Gender & Sexuality, and Sociophonetics. He has been interviewed for programs such as The Vocal Fries podcast.

== Personal life ==
Zimman was raised in the San Francisco Bay Area. Zimman is transgender and uses he/him and they/them pronouns.

== Selected publications ==
- Zimman, Lal (2019). "Trans self-identification and the language of neoliberal selfhood: Agency, power, and the limits of monologic discourse". International Journal of the Sociology of Language (2019): 147–175. doi:10.1515/ijsl-2018-2016. S2CID 150715919.
- Zimman, Lal (2018). "Pronouns and possibilities: Transgender language activism and reform". In Avineri, Netta; Conley, Robin; Graham, Laura R.; Johnson, Eric; Rosa, Jonathan (eds.). Language and Social Justice: Case Studies on Communication & the Creation of Just Societies. New York: Routledge. pp. 176–183.
- Zimman, Lal (2018). "Transgender voices: Insights on identity, embodiment, and the gender of the voice". Language and Linguistics Compass. 12 (7) e12284. doi:10.1111/lnc3.12284. S2CID 52181825.
- Zimman, Lal (2018). "Working with Transgender Communities". In Mallinson, Christine; Childs, Becky; Van Herk, Gerard (eds.). Data Collection in Sociolinguistics: Methods and Applications. New York: Routledge. pp. 49–52.
- Zimman, Lal (2014). "The discursive construction of sex: Remaking and reclaiming the gendered body in talk about genitals among trans men". In Zimman, Lal; Raclaw, Joshua; Davis, Jenny (eds.). Queer Excursions: Retheorizing Binaries in Language, Gender, and Sexuality. Oxford University Press. pp. 13–34.
- Davis, Jenny; Zimman, Lal; Raclaw, Joshua (2014). "Opposites attract: Retheorizing binaries in language, gender, and sexuality". In Zimman, Lal; Davis, Jenny; Raclaw, Joshua (eds.). Queer Excursions: Retheorizing Binaries in Language, Gender, and Sexuality. Oxford University Press. pp. 1–12.
- Edelman, Elijah; Zimman, Lal (2014). Pfeffer, Carla A. (ed.). "Boycunts and bonus holes: Discourse about transmasculine bodies and the sexual productivity of genitals". Journal of Homosexuality. 61 (5: Special issue on Trans Sexualities): 673–690. doi:10.1080/00918369.2014.870438. PMID 24294971. S2CID 31263792.
- Zimman, Lal (2013). "Hegemonic masculinity and the variability of gay-sounding speech: The perceived sexuality of transgender men". Journal of Language & Sexuality. 2 (1): 1–39. doi:10.1075/jls.2.1.01zim. S2CID 143437724.
- Zimman, Lal; Hall, Kira (2009). "Language, embodiment, and the 'third sex'". In Watt, Dominic; Llamas, Carmen (eds.). Language and Identities. Edinburgh: Edinburgh University Press. pp. 166–178.
- Zimman, Lal (2009). "'The other kind of coming out': Transgender people and the coming out narrative genre". Gender and Language. 3 (1): 53–80. doi:10.1558/genl.v3i1.53.
