= Language and gender =

Ways men and women use language differently

Research into the many possible relationships, intersections and tensions between language and gender is diverse. This field crosses disciplinary boundaries, and, as a bare minimum, could be said to encompass work notionally housed within applied linguistics, linguistic anthropology, conversation analysis, cultural studies, feminist media studies, feminist psychology, gender studies, interactional sociolinguistics, linguistics, mediated stylistics, sociolinguistics, and feminist language reform and media studies.

In methodological terms, there is no single approach that could be said to 'hold the field'. Instead, discursive, poststructural, ethnomethodological, ethnographic, phenomenological, positivist and experimental approaches can all be seen in action during the study of language and gender, producing and reproducing what Susan Speer has described as 'different, and often competing, theoretical and political assumptions about the way discourse, ideology and gender identity should be conceived and understood'.

As a result, research in this area can perhaps most usefully be divided into two main areas of study. First, there is a broad and sustained interest in the varieties of speech associated with a particular gender; also a related interest in the social norms and conventions that (re)produce gendered language use (a variety of speech, or sociolect associated with a particular gender which is sometimes called a genderlect). Second, there are studies that focus on ways language can produce and maintain sexism and gender bias, and studies that focus on the contextually specific and locally situated ways in which gender is constructed and operationalized. In this sense, researchers try to understand how language affects the gender binary in society.

Historically, the study of gender and language in sociolinguistics and gender studies is often said to have begun with Robin Lakoff's 1975 book, Language and Woman's Place, as well as some earlier studies by Lakoff. The study of language and gender has developed greatly since the 1970s. Prominent scholars include Deborah Tannen, Penelope Eckert, Janet Holmes, Mary Bucholtz, Kira Hall, Deborah Cameron, Jane Sunderland and others. Among key works in the field, the 1995 edited volume Gender Articulated: Language and the Socially Constructed Self is often referred to as a central text on language and gender.

== History and development of the field ==
The early studies on the notion of language and gender are combined into the fields of linguistics, feminist theory, and political practice. The feminist movement of the 1970s and 1980s started to research on the relationship between language and gender. These researches were related to the women's liberation movement, and their goal was to discover the linkage between language usage and gender asymmetries. Since then, feminists have been working on the ways that language is maintaining the existing patriarchy and sexism.

=== Deficit model (1970s) ===
Early work on language and gender began by noticing ways in which women's language deviated from the presumed default, or men's, language practices. In 1975 Robin Lakoff identified a "women's register", which she argued served to maintain women's (inferior) role in society. Lakoff argued that women tend to use linguistic forms that reflect and reinforce a subordinate role. These include tag questions, question intonation, and "weak" directives, among others (see also Speech practices associated with gender, below). This research was influential in questioning research on language that only looked at men's language practices and recognizing that gendered differences in language exist. However, not long after the publication of Language and Woman's Place, other scholars began to produce studies that both challenged Lakoff's arguments and expanded the field of language and gender studies.

Studies such as Lakoff's Language and Woman's Place have been labeled the "deficit approach", since they assume that adult male language is standard, and that women's language is deficient. Descriptions of women's speech as deficient can actually be dated as far back as Otto Jespersen's "The Woman", a chapter in his 1922 book Language: Its Nature and Development, and Origin. While later work has problematized Jespersen's view of women as inferior, Jespersen's contributions are still considered relevant, especially about the prospect of language change based on social and gendered opportunity, lexical and phonological differences, and the idea of genderlects and how gender roles influence language. The "dominance approach" (see below) is considered a refinement of the deficit model, positing that perceived gendered 'deficits' result from power differences in society.

=== Dual culture/difference and dominance models (1980–1990s) ===
The dual cultures (or difference model) is an approach of equality, differentiating men and women as belonging to different 'sub-cultures' as they have been socialized to do so since childhood. This then results in the varying communicative styles of men and women. Deborah Tannen is a major advocate of this position. Tannen compares gender differences in language to cultural differences. Comparing conversational goals, she argues that men tend to use a "report style", aiming to communicate factual information, whereas women more often use a "rapport style", which is more concerned with building and maintaining relationships. Scholars including Tannen and others argue that differences are pervasive across media, including face-to-face conversation, written essays of primary school children, email, and even toilet graffiti.

Dominance is an approach whereby women are seen as the subordinate group whose difference in style of speech results from male supremacy and also possibly an effect of patriarchy. This results in a primarily male-centered language. Scholars such as Dale Spender and Don Zimmerman and Candace West subscribe to this view. One of the most outstanding sentiments in these studies is the concept of power. Researchers have been trying to understand the patterns of language to show how it can reflect the power imbalance in society. Some of them believe that men have social advantages which can be seen in the men's usage of language. Also, some of them think that there are women's disadvantages in society which are reflected in language. For example, some feminist language researchers have tried to find how the advantages of men had manifested in language. They argue how, in the past, philosophers, politicians, grammarians, linguists, and others were men who have had control over language, so they entered their sexist thoughts in it as a means to regulate their domination.

Some scholars problematize both the dominance and the dual cultures approach. Deborah Cameron notes that throughout the history of scholarship on language and gender male-associated forms have been seen as the unmarked norm from which the female deviates. For example, the norm 'manager' becomes the marked form 'manageress' when referring to a female counterpart. On the other hand, Cameron argues that what the difference approach labels as different ways of using or understanding language are actually displays of differential power. Cameron suggests, "It is comforting to be told that nobody needs to 'feel awful': that there are no real conflicts, only misunderstandings. ... But the research evidence does not support the claims made by Tannen and others about the nature, the causes, and the prevalence of male-female miscommunication." She argues that social differences between men's and women's roles are not clearly reflected in language use. One additional example is a study she has done on call center operators in the UK, where these operators are trained to be scripted in what they say and to perform the necessary 'emotional labor' (smiling, expressive intonation, showing rapport/empathy and giving minimal responses) for their customer-callers. This emotional labor is commonly associated with the feminine domain, and the call center service workers are also typically women. However, the men working in this call center do not orient to the covertly gendered meanings when they are tasked to perform this emotional labor. While this does not mean that the 'woman's language' is revalued, nor does this necessarily call for a feminist celebration, Cameron highlights that it is possible that with time, more men may work in this service industry, and this may lead to a subsequent "de-gendering" of this linguistic style.

=== Social constructionist models (2000s) ===
The dynamic or social constructionist approach is the most current approach to language and gender. Instead of speech falling into a natural gendered category, the dynamic nature and multiple factors of an interaction help a socially appropriate gendered construct. As such, West and Zimmerman describe these constructs as "doing gender" instead of the speech itself necessarily being classified in a particular category. This is to say that these social constructs, while affiliated with particular genders, can be utilized by speakers as they see fit.

Communication styles are always a product of context, and as such, gender differences tend to be most pronounced in single-gender groups. One explanation for this, is that people accommodate their language towards the style of the person they are interacting with. Thus, in a mixed-gender group, gender differences tend to be less pronounced. A similarly important observation is that this accommodation is usually towards the language style, not the gender of the person. That is, a polite and empathic man will tend to be accommodated to on the basis of their being polite and empathic, rather than their being a man.

However, Ochs argues that gender can be indexed directly and indirectly. Direct indexicality is the primary relationship between linguistics resources (such as lexicon, morphology, syntax, phonology, dialect and language) and gender. For example, the pronouns "he" and "she" directly indexes "male" and "female". However, there can be a secondary relationship between linguistic resources and gender where the linguistic resources can index certain acts, activities or stances which then indirectly index gender. In other words, these linguistic resources help constitute gender. Examples include the Japanese particles "wa" and "ze". The former directly index delicate intensity, which then indirectly indexes the female "voice" while the latter directly indexes coarse intensity, which then indirectly indexes the male "voice".

== Language and power ==
In the past, many feminist language researchers believed that power is something separate from language, which helps powerful groups, for example, men, to dominate the way language is being produced and used in society. Nowadays, some researchers consider that power is embedded in the language structures rather than being outside of it. For instance, the language of science helps to regulate the ideas of the dominant groups in it, which can never be completely neutral. Even in psychology, the interpretations of gender had always some benefits for the academics who were writing about it, so it was always important that who is using the language and how they are using it to explain something.

The norms of appropriate ways of talking for different genders are an example of the concept of power in language. There are many social forces to determine the ways different genders are supposed to communicate with each other. As these norms are the results of the present hierarchy in society, doubting them leads to challenging the social orders which originate these patterns. Many studies in this field presume that there are gender differences in language use; therefore, they examine how different genders vary in their speech styles. However, this approach does not incorporate the debate of who initially decided to set these differences and norms, and why these norms are generally accepted. "Language is a complex and dynamic system that produces meaning about social categories such as gender". In this sense, power is not something outside this system, but a part of it.

The notion of gender is not static. Rather, this notion varies from culture to culture and from time to time. "Feminine" and "masculine" are socially constructed concepts that through a set of repeated acts, have become natural. Simone de Beauvoir's famous dictum manifests this idea: "One is not born, but rather becomes a woman." Accordingly, performing acts following social norms leads to the phenomenon of gendered speech. As femininity and masculinity are not fixed concepts, their style of talking can also be a result of power relations in society regulating social standards.

In each society, the notion of gender is learned from early childhood through conversation, humour, parenting, institutions, media, and other ways of imparting knowledge. Hence, gender seems a natural and even scientific concept to all the individuals of a society. Many scholars have been trying to not only find the truth behind this common sense but also understand why this concept is taken for granted. This kind of research requires questioning some underlying assumptions about gender, and approaching this concept from a different point of view. Gender is not something people are born with, but people learn to perform and act based on the expected norms of it, which has nothing to do with physiology and hormones.

In the matter of linguistic competence – the ability to produce knowledge and understand it via language – sociolinguistic and linguistic anthropologists believe that knowledge of structure and morphology alone cannot help a person to communicate with others. Instead, they think that one needs to know the social norms people use in different languages to interact with them. People gradually learn how to use language in specific social situations and develop communicative competence. Therefore, language and social norms are dynamic and interconnected. As people use language concerning these norms, it plays a vital role in manifesting and sustaining social standards and can be a tool for reproducing power relations and gender oppression. One of the examples to show this interconnection would be the fact that there is no equivalent for "sir" to use in addressing a female authority. This fact cannot be related to the language itself, but it is correlated to the perception that authorities have always been male. The other example is the way women get addressed by Miss, Mrs., or Ms., while men are only addressed by Mr., which is a term that shows their gender, not marital status. Unlike men, women's relationships can affect their social status, and they can be judged and qualified based on it.

== Language and symbolism ==
Language is one of the most powerful ways of communicating with a wide variety of people in different contexts. Humans look for symbolism and meaning in the world. Language is a way of communicating how a person perceives the world and how one builds connections with oneself and others. Linguistic abilities hold power and change through the lens of culture and gender. According to Susan Gal in the book Language, Gender, and Power, "Such visions are inscribed in language, and most important, enacted in interaction. Although women's everyday talk and women's voice or consciousness have been studied separately, I have argued that both can be understood as strategic responses, often of resistance, to dominate hegemonic cultural forms".

Dominant language is assumed through the male perspective and is considered assertive, direct, and a need for the individual to express their needs and desires. The other form of speech is submissive which many people assume is the female voice which consists of indirectness, politeness, and a focus on the listener's needs. These stereotypes are culturally based and are not always the reality of how individuals communicate or view the world.

According to Robin Lakoff's book, Language and A Woman's Place, "It will be found that the overall effect of 'women's language' – meaning both language restricted in use to women and language descriptive of women alone – is this: it submerges a woman's personal identity, by denying her the means of expressing herself strongly, on the one hand, and encouraging expressions that suggest triviality in subject matter and uncertainty about it; and, when a woman is being discussed, by treating her as an object – sexual or otherwise – but never a serious person with individual views". Women were expected to be polite and not as direct to fit the gender perceived role of women being homemakers and emotional which is not an accurate statement in today's society, although it differs from society to society. Men were given more privileges than women in American society and that power dynamic created an unequal playing field for many years.

== Practices associated with gender in formally gender-neutral languages ==
Gender plays a crucial role in shaping lexical variation, as men and women in similar contexts select slightly different words, expressions, and linguistic styles statistically on average. Linguistic variation is influenced by social norms, cultural expectations, and conversational dynamics.

Scholars of language and gender have identified certain typical gender-based variations, detailed below. However, the patterns are not universal. Not all members of a particular gender necessarily conform to stereotypical gender roles. In particular, individuals within a gender category may exhibit diverse linguistic practices that challenge or deviate from these generalizations.

=== Minimal responses ===
One of the ways in which the communicative behaviors of men and women differ is in their use of minimal responses, i.e., paralinguistic features such as 'mm' and 'yeah', which is behaviour associated with collaborative language use. Men generally use them less frequently than women, and when they do, it is usually to show agreement, as Don Zimmerman and Candace West's study of turn-taking in conversation indicates.

While the above can be true in some contexts and situations, studies that dichotomize the communicative behavior of men and women may run the risk of overgeneralization. For example, "minimal responses appearing "throughout streams of talk", such as "mm" or "yeah", may only function to display active listening and interest and are not always signs of "support work", as Fishman claims. They can—as more detailed analysis of minimal responses show—signal understanding, demonstrate agreement, indicate scepticism or a critical attitude, demand clarification or show surprise. In other words, both male and female participants in a conversation can employ these minimal responses for interactive functions, rather than gender-specific functions.

=== Questions ===
Some research has argued that men and women differ in their use of questions in conversations. For men, a question is usually a genuine request for information whereas with women it can often be a rhetorical means of engaging the other's conversational contribution or of acquiring attention from others conversationally involved, techniques associated with a collaborative approach to language use. Therefore, women use questions more frequently.

=== Question tags ===
A study carried out by Alice Freed and Alice Greenwood in 1996 showed that there was no significant difference in the use of question tags, such as "you know?" between genders. Tag questions are frequently used to verify or confirm information, though in women's language they may also be used to avoid making strong statements.

=== Turn-taking ===
As the work of Victoria DeFrancisco shows, female linguistic behaviour characteristically encompasses a desire to take turns in conversation with others, which is opposed to men's tendency towards centering on their own point or remaining silent when presented with such implicit offers of conversational turn-taking as are provided by hedges such as "y' know" and "isn't it". This desire for turn-taking gives rise to complex forms of interaction in relation to the more regimented form of turn-taking commonly exhibited by men.

=== Changing the topic of conversation ===
According to Bruce Dorval in his study of same-sex friend interaction, males tend to change subject more frequently than females. This difference may well be at the root of the conception that women chatter and talk too much. Goodwin observes that girls and women link their utterances to previous speakers and develop each other's topics, rather than introducing new topics.

However, a study of young American couples and their interactions reveal that while women raise twice as many topics as men, it is the men's topics that are usually taken up and subsequently elaborated in the conversation. An examination of conversational topics pursued by men and women reveals notable differences. Dunbar, Marriot and Duncan found that men display self-promoting conversational behaviors. This can look like discussing achievements at work or competitive leisure activities. Researchers discovered that this behavior increases when women are present in the conversation. Women, however, converse more about personal topics, such as children, family, and health. This social-networking behavior was rarely found in conversations held by older men. These content differences also impact the linguistic features of conversations. One study that examined 8,353 text-message conversations found that women used past tense verbs in conversation more than men, a reflection of their tendency to discuss past events and information related to people. In the same study, men used numbers in conversation more often than women did. These figures supported their discussions of money, sports and the workplace.

=== Self-disclosure ===
Self-disclosure is not simply providing information to another person. Instead, scholars define self-disclosure as sharing information with others that they would not normally know or discover. Self-disclosure involves risk and vulnerability on the part of the person sharing the information. Deborah Tannen's work argues that men and women have different views of self-disclosure, that women have a tendency toward self-disclosure, i.e., sharing their problems and experiences with others, often to offer sympathy, which contrasts with men's tendencies to non-self disclosure and professing advice or offering a solution when confronted with another's problems.

Research has been conducted to examine whether self-disclosure in adult friendship differs according to gender and marital status. Sixty-seven women and fifty-three men were asked about intimate and non-intimate self-disclosure to closest same-sex friends. Disclosure to spouse among married respondents was also assessed. Married people's non-intimate disclosure to friends was lower than that of unmarried people, regardless of gender. Married people's intimate disclosure to their spouses was high regardless of gender; in comparison, married men's intimate disclosure to their friends was low, while married women's disclosure to their friends was moderate or even as high as disclosure to their spouses. The results suggest that gender roles are not the only determinant of gender differences in disclosure to friends. Marital status appears to have an important influence on disclosure in friendship for men but not for women. It was concluded that research on gender differences in self-disclosure and friendship has neglected an important variable, that of marital status.

While there are some gendered stereotypes and expectations about self-disclosure, other research shows that people have the ability to still self disclose very clearly regardless of masculine or feminine communication traits. "Sex consistently failed to predict subjects' willingness to self-disclose, both within and across contexts, whereas femininity promoted self-disclosure in the context that was clearly social and expressive in character. Although masculinity failed to exert the expected facilitative impact on self-disclosure within the instrumental context, it nonetheless influenced the results; androgynous subjects, who scored high in both masculinity and femininity, were more self-revealing across contexts than was any other group."

Self-disclosure has also been researched within the context of heterosexual couples, as self-disclosure is considered to be a key factor in facilitating intimacy. For example, American heterosexual couples were studied using various measures twice a year. By using the average scores of both partners, they found that self-disclosure was higher in those couples who remained together at the second administration of the surveys than in those who broke up between two administrations. Similarly, researchers asked heterosexual couples who had just begun dating to complete a self-disclosure measure and to answer the same questionnaire four months later. They found that couples who were still dating four months later reported greater self-disclosure at the initial contact than did those who later broke up. This work shows self-disclosure can be beneficial to facilitating a positive relationship.

=== Verbal aggression ===
Aggression can be defined by its three intersecting counterparts: indirect, relational and social. Indirect aggression occurs when the victim is attacked through covert and concealed attempts to cause social suffering. Examples are gossiping, exclusion or ignoring of the victim. Relational aggression, while similar to indirect, is more resolute in its intentions. It can be a threat to terminate a friendship or spread false rumors. The third type of aggression, social aggression, "is directed toward damaging another's self-esteem, social status, or both, and may take direct forms such as verbal rejection, negative facial expressions or body movements, or more indirect forms such as slanderous rumors or social exclusion." This third type has become more common in adolescent, both male and female, behavior.

Dr. M. K. Underwood, leading researcher in child clinical psychology and developmental psychology, began using the term social aggression in several of her experiments. In one study, Underwood followed 250 third-graders and their families in order to understand how anger is communicated in relationships, especially in face-to-face and behind-the-back situations. It was found that technology and electronic communication has become a key factor in social aggression. This discovery has been termed cyber-bullying. In another experiment, social aggression was used to see if verbal and nonverbal behaviors contributed to a person's social value. It was found that those who communicated nonverbal signals were seen as angry and annoyed by their peers. In a third study, the experimenters determined that while socially aggressive students were vastly disliked, they were alleged to be the popular kids and had the highest marked social status. Most research has been based on teacher assessments, case studies and surveys.

For years, all research on aggression focused primarily on males because it was believed females were non-confrontational. Recently however, people have realized that while "boys tend to be more overtly and physically aggressive, girls are more indirectly, socially, and relationally aggressive." In a study done measuring cartoon character's aggressive acts on television, these statistics were found:

- 76.9% of physical aggression was committed by male characters
- 23.1% of physical aggression was committed by female characters
- 37.2% of social aggression was committed by male characters
- 62.8% of social aggression was committed by female characters

=== Listening and attentiveness ===
In a conversation, meaning does not reside in the words spoken, but is filled in by the person listening. Each person decides if they think others are speaking in the spirit of differing status or symmetrical connection. The likelihood that individuals will tend to interpret someone else's words as one or the other depends more on the hearer's own focus, concerns, and habits than on the spirit in which the words were intended.

Men interrupt far more frequently with non-related topics, especially in the mixed sex setting and, far from rendering a female speaker's responses minimal, are apt to greet her conversational spotlights with silence, as the work of Victoria DeFrancisco demonstrates.

When men talk and women listen and agree, men tend to misinterpret this agreement, which was intended in a spirit of connection, as a reflection of status and power. A man might conclude that a woman is indecisive or insecure as a result of her listening and attempts of acknowledgment. In actuality, a woman's reasons for behaving this way may have nothing to do with her attitudes toward her knowledge, but are a result of her attitudes toward her relationships. The act of giving information frames the speaker with a higher status, while the act of listening frames the listener as lower. However, when women listen to men, they are not necessarily thinking in terms of status, but in terms of connection and support.

=== Heterosexual relationships ===
As described above, there are certain stereotypes society places on the way men and women communicate. Men are stereotyped to be more of a public speaker and leader, while women are stereotyped to talk more in private among their family and friends. For women, society views their use of communication as a way to express feelings and emotions. For men, society views their use of communication as a way to express power and negotiate status among other individuals. There are also certain societal stereotypes about how men and women communicate within a heterosexual marriage or relationship. When a man and a woman are communicating within their relationship, the traditional language roles are altered. The man becomes more passive and the woman becomes more active. A man's stereotypical silent communication style is often disappointing for women, while a woman's emotionally articulate communication style is often seen as aggravating for a man. This creates the assumption that women and men have opposing communication styles, therefore creating society's cliche that men and women don't understand each other.

=== Dominance versus subjection ===
This, in turn, suggests a dichotomy between a male desire for conversational dominance – noted by Helena Leet-Pellegrini with reference to male experts speaking more verbosely than their female counterparts – and a female aspiration to group conversational participation. One corollary of this is, according to Jennifer Coates, that males are afforded more attention in the context of the classroom and that this can lead to their gaining more attention in scientific and technical subjects, which in turn can lead to their achieving better success in those areas, ultimately leading to their having more power in a technocratic society.

Conversation is not the only area where power is an important aspect of the male/female dynamic. Power is reflected in every aspect of communication, from the actual topic of the communication, to the ways in which it is communicated. Women are typically less concerned with power and more concerned with forming and maintaining relationships, whereas men are more concerned with their status. Girls and women feel it is crucial that they be liked by their peers, a form of involvement that focuses on symmetrical connection. Boys and men feel it is crucial that they be respected by their peers, as form of involvement that focuses on asymmetrical status. These differences in priorities are reflected in the ways in which men and women communicate. A woman's communication will tend to be more focused on building and maintaining relationships. Men, on the other hand, will place a higher priority on power, and their communication styles will reflect their desire to maintain their status in the relationship.

According to Tannen's research, men tend to tell stories as another way to maintain their status. Primarily, men tell jokes, or stories that focus on themselves. Women on the other hand, are less concerned with their own power, and therefore their stories revolve not around themselves, but around others. By putting themselves on the same level as those around them, women attempt to downplay their part in their own stories, which strengthens their connections to those around them.

=== Politeness ===
Lakoff identified three forms of politeness: formal, deference, and camaraderie. Women's language is characterized by formal and deference politeness, whereas men's language is exemplified by camaraderie.

There is a generalization about conservativeness and politeness in women's speech. It is commonly believed that women are gentle, while men are rough and rude. Since there is no evidence for the total accuracy of this perception, researchers have tried to examine the reasons behind it. Statistics show a pattern that women tend to use more "standard" variable of the language. For example, in the case of negative concord, e.g., I didn't do anything vs. I didn't do nothing, women usually use the standard form. Pierre Bourdieu introduced the concept of the linguistic marketplace. According to this concept, different varieties of language have different values. When people want to be accepted in a diplomatic organization, they need to have a range of knowledge to show their competency. Possessing the right language is as important as the right style of dress. Both of these manners have social values. While Bourdieu focuses on the diplomatic corps, it would be true if people want to be accepted in other contexts such as an urban ghetto. The market that one wants to engage with has a profound effect on the value of the variation of language they may use. The relations of each gender to linguistic markets are different. A study on pronunciation of English in Norwich has shown women's usage is considerably more conservative regarding the standard dialect. This research provides some evidence that women's exclusion from the workplace has led to this variation. As women in some cases have not had the same position as men and their opportunities to secure these positions have been fewer, they have tried to use more valued variations of the language. It can be the standard one, or the polite version, or the so-called "right" one.

=== Gender differences in political communication ===
Situational context is another factor that affects verbal and non-verbal communication behaviors based on gender. In male-dominated fields, such as politics, women employ a balance of masculine and feminine behaviors to appear both competent and likable to an audience of male peers. In a study that reviewed speeches given by female members of the United States Congress throughout the 2010s, congresswomen performed masculine verbal behavior (i.e., accusations, attacks on character) similarly to male members of Congress, but congresswomen performed more feminine non-verbal behaviors (i.e., smiling, facial expressions, varied tone of voice) compared to their male counterparts. Gender differences in political communication also appear in political arenas outside of the United States. In a study of speeches given by members of the United Kingdom's Parliament, female parliamentarians were found to use concrete examples or personal anecdotal evidence to support their arguments more than male parliamentarians. Male parliamentarians, on the other hand, were found to base their arguments in abstract descriptions of groups or issues. Additionally, the presence of another female MP increased female parliamentarians' participation in political debates.

=== Children's television ===
A specific area of study within the field of language and gender is the way in which it affects children's television. Mulac et al.'s "Male/Female Language Differences and Attributional Consequences in Children's Television" focuses on identifying differing speech patterns of male versus female characters in popular children's television programs at the time (the 1980s). The data gathered by Mulac et al. comes from a two-week period in 1982 from three Public Broadcasting Service daytime programs and three categories from commercial network programs (action, comedy/adventure, and commercials) that aired on Saturdays. They analyzed randomly selected interactive dialogue taken once from every ten minutes of their tapes. Mulac et al. collected data for 37 language variables, from which they determined the thirteen that showed significant differences between usage by male and female characters. Mulac et al.'s definitions of these thirteen features are as follows:

Vocalized pauses	Utterance without semantic meaning (uh, um, etc.)
Verbs	(See verb page)
Uncertainty verbs	Verb phrase that shows some level of uncertainty ('I'm not sure if...', 'It might be', etc.)
Action verbs	Verbs that specify physical action
Present tense verbs	Verb phrases in the present tense, including but not limited to habitual actions and historical present
Adverbials begin sentence	Tells how, when, or where a sentence or phrase takes place ('Yesterday, I went to Taco Bell')
Justifiers	Gives reason/justification for a previous utterance or action
Judgmental adjectives	Indicates a personal and subjective opinion/evaluation
Concrete nouns	Nouns that can be perceived by one or more of the five senses
Subordinating conjunctions	After, as soon as, until, etc. (See subordinating conjunctions)
Grammatical errors	Utterances which are viewed incorrect by a prescriptivist grammar
Polite forms	Utterances that express some degree of politeness

The following tended to be higher in frequency for males: vocalized pauses, action verbs, present tense verbs, justifiers, subordinating conjunctions, and grammatical "errors". On the other hand, the following were found to occur more for females: total verbs, uncertainty verbs, adverbials beginning sentences, judgmental adjectives, concrete nouns, and polite forms. In addition, female characters had longer sentences on average.

Mulac et al. also gathered participants' subjective ratings on characters' socio-intellectual status (high/low social status, white/blue collar, literate/illiterate, rich/poor), dynamism (aggressive/unaggressive, strong/weak, loud/soft, active/passive), and aesthetic quality (pleasing/displeasing, sweet/sour, nice/awful, beautiful/ugly), based on the transcripts from the shows' dialogue.

Aubrey's 2004 study "The Gender-Role Content of Children's Favorite Television Programs and Its Links to Their Gender-Related Perceptions" identifies gender stereotypes in children's television programs and evaluates the effects of these stereotypes on children's personal gender-role values and interpersonal attraction. Aubrey chose shows for the study based on children's responses when asked to name their favorite television program (the top-named show was Rugrats, followed by Doug). Some of the stereotypes found in the study pertain to language/communication, but most are stereotypes or attributes of the characters such as assertiveness, aggression, emotionality, and cattiness. In regards to language, the study found that male characters were more likely to ask questions, assert opinions, and direct others than female characters. Female characters, on the other hand, were more likely to "receive or make comments about body or beauty" than their male counterparts.

In general, Aubrey found less stereotypical content for female characters than for male, which they ascribe as possibly an effect of either the higher presence of male characters or the difficulty of measuring passivity.

== Transgender linguistics ==
While much work on language and gender has focused on the differences between people of binary genders (men and women) and cisgender people, with the rise of social constructionist models of language and gender scholarship, there has been a turn towards explorations of how individuals of all genders perform masculinity and femininity (as well as other gendered identities) through language.

Early work on transgender people's voice/language came out of speech pathology, as many transgender people undergo specific voice therapies (voice feminization for transgender women and voice masculinization for transgender men) as part of their transition. Within sociocultural linguistics, Lal Zimman's work has been influential in developing the field of trans linguistics. Within the context of US and English-speaking trans and gender diverse communities, linguistic features at various levels, whether phonetic features (e.g., pitch and /s/ production), lexical items (e.g., body part names and pronouns), and semiotic systems (e.g., linguistic and aesthetic style), have been shown to be important resources for naming trans identities and for constructing and communicating these identities to the world. Sociophonetic research within trans communities has explored how the gendered voice is constructed, performed, and heard. Lexical analyses have shown how labels and pronouns have allowed non-normative gender individuals to claim linguistic agency over their own experience of gender as well as to challenge and reclaim pathological terminology ascribed by doctors and psychologists.

== Gender-dependent languages ==
Some languages exhibit different vocabulary, pronunciation, or writing systems, depending on the gender of the speaker.

== See also ==
- Binnen-I, a German typographic convention promoting gender equality
- Gender and Language (journal)
- Gender differences in Japanese
- Gender-neutral language
- Gender paradox (sociolinguistics)
- Gender role in language
- Láadan
- LGBT linguistics, also known as lavender linguistics
- Men's studies
- Nüshu script, a syllabic script used exclusively among women in Jiangyong County in Hunan province, China
- Women's studies
