= Rusty Barrett =

American linguist

- Occupations: Linguist; professor

Academic background
- Education: Trinity University (B.A.); University of Texas at Austin (M.A., Ph.D.)

Academic work
- Institutions: University of Kentucky

Edward Rush Barrett is an American linguist and linguistic anthropologist. He is Chair and Professor of Linguistics at the University of Kentucky. With Kira Hall, he is the editor of the Oxford Handbook on Language and Sexuality. With Jennifer Cramer and Kevin B. McGowan, he published the revised third edition of Rosina Lippi-Green's textbook English with an Accent. His work has primarily focused on Mayan Languages and Language, Gender and Sexuality.

== Education and research ==
Barrett earned a B.A. in Russian language and literature from Trinity University, in San Antonio, Texas, and he received both an M.A. and Ph.D. (1999) in Linguistics from the University of Texas at Austin. His Ph.D. dissertation is titled, A grammar of Sipakapense Maya.

He co-convened the Linguistic Society of America Summer Institute at the University of Kentucky in 2017.

== Honors ==
Barrett received the Arnold Zwicky Award from the Linguistic Society of America in 2022.

Barrett was senior editor of Oxford Research Review in Linguistics 2012–2015, served on the editorial board of Journal of English Linguistics 2007–2015, Gender and Language 2011–2020, and Western Journal of Communication 2014.

== Selected publications ==
=== Books ===
- Barrett, Rusty, Jennifer Cramer, and Kevin B. McGowan. 2022. English with an accent: Language, ideology, and discrimination in the United States. Third Edition. Taylor & Francis. DOI: https://doi.org/10.4324/9781003332886
- Barrett, Rusty. 2017. From drag queens to leathermen: Language, gender, and gay male subcultures. Oxford University Press. DOI:https://doi.org/10.1093/acprof:oso/9780195390179.001.0001

=== Edited books ===
- Hall, Kira; Barrett, Rusty, eds. 2018. Language and sexuality. Oxford Handbooks Online. doi:10.1093/oxfordhb/9780190212926.001.0001
