= Penelope Eckert =

American sociolinguist (born 1942)

Penelope "Penny" Eckert (born 1942) is an American sociolinguist and the Albert Ray Lang Professor Emerita of Linguistics at Stanford University. She specializes in variationist sociolinguistics and is the author of several scholarly works on language and gender. She served a three-year presidential cycle of the Linguistic Society of America.

== Biography ==
Eckert received her PhD in linguistics in 1978 from Columbia University, where she was a student of William Labov. She is the author or co-author of three books on sociolinguistics, the co-editor of three collections, and author of numerous scholarly papers in the field. She attended Oberlin College in 1963 as an undergraduate.

Eckert served as the president of the International Gender and Language Association from 2000 until 2003. She was elected as a Fellow of the American Academy of Arts and Sciences in 2011. In 2012, she was inducted as a Fellow of the Linguistic Society of America, where she had previously served on a number of committees, including the ethics, ethnic diversity in linguistics, nominating, and status of women in linguistics, where she served as committee chair from 1990 to 1991. In 2016, she was elected president of the LSA. She proceeded to serve as vice president/president-elect in 2017, president in 2018, and past president in 2019.

As president of the organization, Eckert worked to combat workplace harassment and power dynamics in the linguistics community, through a panel entitled "Our Linguistics Community: Addressing Bias, Power Dynamics, Harassment," as well as developing an open dialogue among the ethics, status of women in linguistics, and ethnic diversity in linguistics committees.

Eckert is a professor of linguistics at Stanford University where she is an active affiliate of the feminist, gender, and sexuality studies program, and is a member of various committees.

Eckert's research shows that adolescents are the "movers and shakers of linguistic change," which explains her focus on this demographic in much of her research, specifically the creation of adolescence in the United States.

== Work ==
=== Early work ===
Eckert became interested in her field of work through her own experience, dissatisfied with the way that it was being approached from a scholarly standpoint. Eckert has mainly collaborated with Sally McConnell-Ginet, a Professor Emeritis at Cornell University. The two started working together in 1990, have given talks together, and worked on one of her most well known works, Language and Gender.

Her early work focused on phonological variation in Gascon. During this period she specialized in the spread of sound change across geographical regions, specifically in Southern France. She studied the elderly population, who were the first generation to learn French as a second language after their regional language. She returned to Gascon in 2005 to continue her work there, focusing on the diversity of isoglosses in the area.

=== Current goals ===
Her more recent work focuses on the social meaning of linguistic variables, particularly in English.

Eckert's research aims to address shifts in linguistic patterns in how gender is addressed and concentrates on adolescents since they are the "movers and shakers in linguistic change". She does this through the use of "in-depth ethnographic fieldwork focusing on the relation between variation, linguistic style, social identity and social practice."

Eckert developed three waves of analytic practice to facilitate the study of sociolinguistics and how it varies within communities. The first wave focuses on how linguistic variations relate to different demographic communities in highly populated American cities. The second wave deconstructed social structures with a more ethnographic approach. Finally, the third wave built upon the first two waves by articulating how these social structures are interpreted in a local context.

=== Language and adolescence ===
Eckert's focus on language in adolescence and preadolescence began in the early eighties with Jocks and Burnouts, an ethnographic project set in suburban Detroit high schools. Eckert's work highlighted social categories as cultures that structured the use of phonological variables within the high school setting.

Jocks, embodying middle-class values, profit from the corporate organization of education which simulates expectations and norms of the corporate workplace, one in which personal values coincide with those of the organization; their social networks are restricted to those within the school environment and within similar age groups. Burnouts, on the other hand, embody working-class cultures, resisting the corporate norms of education in preparation to enter the blue-collar workforce; burnouts' social networks extend across age groups and local and urban environments. Rather than restrict students to the two categories, Eckert emphasizes the hegemonic nature of the dichotomy that structures students' self-identification. In other words, few students exist outside the dichotomy, instead locating themselves as "In-betweens."

Eckert examined the extreme backing and lowering of (uh), a step in the Northern Cities Chain Shift, among jocks, in-betweens, and burnouts, as well as the effect of parents' socioeconomic status on the backing and lowering (uh), finding no correlation; this would indicate that parents' socioeconomic status had no substantial effect. Rather, it was students' jock/burnout identities and social network clusters that showed the stronger correlation, wherein burnouts exhibited the highest frequency of (uh) backing and lowering.

In the late nineties, Eckert conducted ethnographic work at two elementary schools in San Jose, California; one school served a predominantly working-class and middle-class Anglo-American population, while the other served a primarily poor and ethnically diverse student population. Adopting a communities of practice approach, Eckert studied the stylistic development of a heterosexual marketplace or field of gender difference among fifth and sixth graders. In particular, Eckert examined the role of linguistic variation in this development, including nasal variation in /ae/, emotional expression via pitch range, and indexicality of /o/, /ay/, and /ow/ fronting.

=== Language and gender ===
==== Valley-girl speak ====
Eckert researches language in discourse communities as well as recognizing the linguistic and ethnic dialects that continue to grow. She not only studies the change in children's and teenagers' vernacular in California, but she also analyses how the language and vowels are pronounced. Both Eckert and her graduate students from Stanford University created a study called "Voices of California", which examines English language variation in different parts of California. California is one of the newer states as well as an ethnically diverse state. The pre-conceived notion that California speech is based solely on Hollywood is false and the cultural and linguistic diversity throughout the state is sizable.

Eckert's work employs ethnographic research and follows preadolescents' linguistic development throughout elementary and middle school years. Eckert notes that pitch is in relation to gender when referring to women and their tonality. She explains that the tone of a woman's voice displays theatrical appeal and variability in language. Valley girl-speak stereotypes are known to be a distinctive Californian cultured dialect. California women are known for valley-girl language, whereas California men are known for their pitch rising throughout their sentences following a plateau. Uptalk also occurs later in their phrases and Eckert is known to analyze uptalk in detail.

===== California vowel shift =====
The California dialects also play a role in establishing vowel shifts throughout the state. Californians view their dialect as similar and identifiable to most states, excluding locations with distinct accents such as Chicago and New York. California English is known for the linguistic and paralinguistic features that articulate vowels "o" and "u", pronounced "eeuw". Popular California vernacular is known for transitional words like "oh", said like "oeeuw" and phrases consisting of, "I'm like" and "she's like", "I'm all" and "he's all", alongside the cliché surfer and skateboarder slang that California English dialect includes.

In the Californian vernacular, vowels are either merged or form a diphthong. Words like "dawn" and "don" are pronounced similarly; different vowels that are pronounced with the same sound. A common word like "mom" can sound like "mawm". Diphthong is the combined sound of two vowels in one syllable. Words like "coin" and "house" are examples of a diphthong.

=== Communities of practice in sociolinguistics ===
==== Community of practice ====
Central to Eckert's sociolinguistic theoretical framework is the concept of community of practice. The notion of community of practice was formulated by Jean Lave and Etienne Wenger both of whom Eckert met in 1989 while working at the Institute for Research on Learning in Palo Alto. A community of practice is a group of people who, through interaction and shared context, define a set of practices based upon language style, values, belief systems, dynamics of power, and performance. Examples of communities of practice could be mechanics working at a shop, regular members of a religious congregation, faculty members in a specific department, and members of a sports team that practice and play regularly together. The community of practice is defined by the context of the environment and social dynamics which include age, gender, sex, sexuality, and social class of the participants. One's identity is thus shaped by one's membership and participation in a variety of communities of practice. While originally based on sociological research on 'newcomers' and 'old-timers' in a place of employment, communities of practice, according to Eckert, have a legitimate role in shaping identity through language.

==== Community of practice and language ====
Eckert expanded upon Lave and Wenger's concept by focusing on language use within communities of practice. Through commonalities in the use of language, identities are constructed and co-constructed. In each community, membership is negotiated through language use. Phoneme variation, topics of interest, vocabulary use, discursive practices, and avoidance or uptake of standardized English are all language variables in which one negotiates identity, relationships, and power within and across communities of practice.

==== Community of practice and gender ====
Perhaps the greatest focus of Eckert's work has been the construction of gender within communities of practice. Eckert is cautious of many sociolinguistic studies that draw conclusions about language and gender without taking multiple contextual factors and the variety of community of practices into consideration. While praising William Labov's 1966's department store study and Robin Lakoff's work on gender and language, Eckert points out the contextual limits of making generalizations from those studies. She also highlights that studies of gender and language ought to not solely focus on linguistic differences but also examine overlaps in language use.

Eckert points out that gender is not solitary, but socially constructed through multi-modal factors such as class, sexuality, age, ethnicity, and sex. For example, tag questions and rising intonations are typically attributed to be common markers of 'women's language'. Historically, tags and intonation have been thought of as the language of subordination in mixed-gender settings. Eckert, however, points out that in all-female communities, tags and intonation are used to assert dominance and power. Eckert emphasizes that under a community of practice paradigm, language and gender must avoid generalizations, must be seen as active, must be viewed under an intersectional lens, and that ethnographic studies are central to understanding the social classification that exists within and between communities of practice.

Furthermore, Eckert posits language style as a mechanism by which one establishes identity within communities of practice. For example, Eckert provides examples of early adolescent girls' use of profanity in a variety of communities of practice. She points out that generalizations about the use of profanity are problematic because the reasons for such discourse could be varied. Profanity could be used as an affront to authority, a marker of style to establish a rougher identity, as dissociating from communities of practice of the 'goodies' social groups, or as associating with a profanity-using mother. Eckert claims that as hair and dress change across communities of practice, so does language style and use as people seek connections across various linguistic communities.

== Publications, collaborations, and editorial work ==
- Eckert, Penelope. (1990) Cooperative Competition in Adolescent Girl Talk. Discourse Processes. 13, 92P122. (Reprinted in Deborah Tannen ed. 1993. Gender and Conversational Interaction. Oxford University Press, 91P122.)
- Eckert, Penelope and Sally McConnell-Ginet. (1992) Communities of Practice: Where Language, Gender and Power all Live. In Kira Hall, Mary Bucholtz and Birch Moonwomon eds., Locating Power: Proceedings of the 1992 Berkeley Women and Language Conference. Berkeley: Berkeley Women and Language Group, 89-99. Reprinted in Jennifer Coates ed. (In press). Readings in Language and Gender. Cambridge: Blackwell.
- Eckert, Penelope. (1999) Comments on Don Kulick's paper "Language and Gender/Sexuality". Language-Culture Symposium. http://www.language-culture.org/archives/mailing-lists/l-c/199911/msg00004.html
- Eckert, Penelope. (1995) Constructing meaning, constructing selves: Snapshots of language, gender and class from Belten High. In Mary Buchholtz and Kira Hall eds., Gender Articulated: Language and the Culturally Constructed Self. Routledge, 469-507.
- Eckert, Penelope. (2002) Demystifying sexuality and desire. Language and sexuality: Contesting meaning in theory and practice. ed. by Kathryn Campbell-Kibler, Robert J. Podesva, Sarah J. Roberts and Andrew Wong, 99-110. Stanford: CSLI Publications.
- Eckert, Penelope. (1997) Gender and sociolinguistic variation. in Jennifer Coates ed. Readings in Language and Gender. Oxford: Blackwell.
- Eckert, Penelope. (1998). Gender, social engagement, and linguistic style. In Inge Lise Pedersen, Jann Scheuer Eds., Sprog, Koen – og Kommunikation. Rapport fra 3.Nordiske Konference om Sproeg og Koen. Koebenhavn. 11. - 13. oktober 1997. Copenhagen: C.A.Reitzels Forlag
- Eckert, Penelope. (1997). Gender, race and class in the preadolescent marketplace of identities. Paper presented at the 96th Annual Meeting of the American Anthropological Association. Washington DC.
- Eckert, Penelope. (1994) Identities of subordination as a developmental imperative. Working Papers on Learning and Identity 2. Palo Alto: Institute for Research on Learning.
- Eckert, Penelope (1989). Jocks and Burnouts: Social Categories and Identity in the High School. New York: Teachers College Press.
- Eckert, Penelope (2000) Language Variation as Social Practice: The Linguistic Construction of Identity in Belten High. Malden, Massachusetts
- Eckert, Penelope; McConnell-Ginet, Sally (2003). Language and Gender. New York: Cambridge University Press. ISBN 0-521-65426-2.
- Eckert, Penelope. (2003). Language and gender in adolescence. in Janet Holmes and Miriam Meyerhoff eds., Handbook of Language and Gender. Oxford: Blackwell.
- Eckert, Penelope (2018). Meaning and Linguistic Variation: Third Wave in Sociolinguistics. New York: Cambridge University Press
- Eckert, Penelope and Sally McConnell-Ginet. (1999) New generalizations and explanations in language and gender research. Language in Society. 28.2. 185-202.
- Eckert, Penelope (1990) Personal and Professional Networks In Alice Davison and Penelope Eckert Eds., The Cornell Lectures: Women in Linguistics. Washington DC: Linguistic Society of America.
- Eckert, Penelope; Rickford, John, eds. (1997). Style and Sociolinguistic Variation. New York: Cambridge University Press. ISBN 0-521-59789-7.
- Eckert, Penelope and Sally McConnell-Ginet. (1992) Think Practically and Look Locally: Language and Gender as Community-Based Practice. Annual Review of Anthropology. 21, 461-90. (Reprinted in Camille Roman, Suzanne Juhasz and Christanne Miller eds. (1994). The Women and Language Debate. New Brunswick: Rutgers University Press. 432-60).
- Eckert, Penelope (2004). The Good Woman. in Mary Bucholtz ed. Language and woman's place: Text and commentaries. New York: Oxford University Press. 165-70.
- Eckert, Penelope. (1990) The Whole Woman: Sex and Gender Differences in Variation. Language Variation and Change. 1, 245P67. (Reprinted in Donald Brenneis and Ronald Macaulay eds., The Matrix of Language: Contemporary Linguistic Anthropology. Boulder: Westview Press, 116-37.)
- Eckert, Penelope (1996). Vowels and nailpolish: The emergence of linguistic style in the preadolescent heterosexual marketplace. In: Gender and belief systems. ed. by Jocelyn Ahlers et al. Berkeley: Berkeley women and language group.
- Davison, Alice and Penelope Eckert eds. (1990) The Cornell Lectures. Linguistic Society of America.
- New Ways of Analyzing Sound Change. Contributions made by Penelope Eckert. San Diego: Academic Press (1991)
- Women in the Linguistics Profession. Edited by Penelope Eckert. The Committee on the Status of Women in Linguistics of the Linguistic Society of America. (1990) ISBN 9994775782

== See also ==
- List of women linguists
