= Adrian Leemann =

Swiss linguist

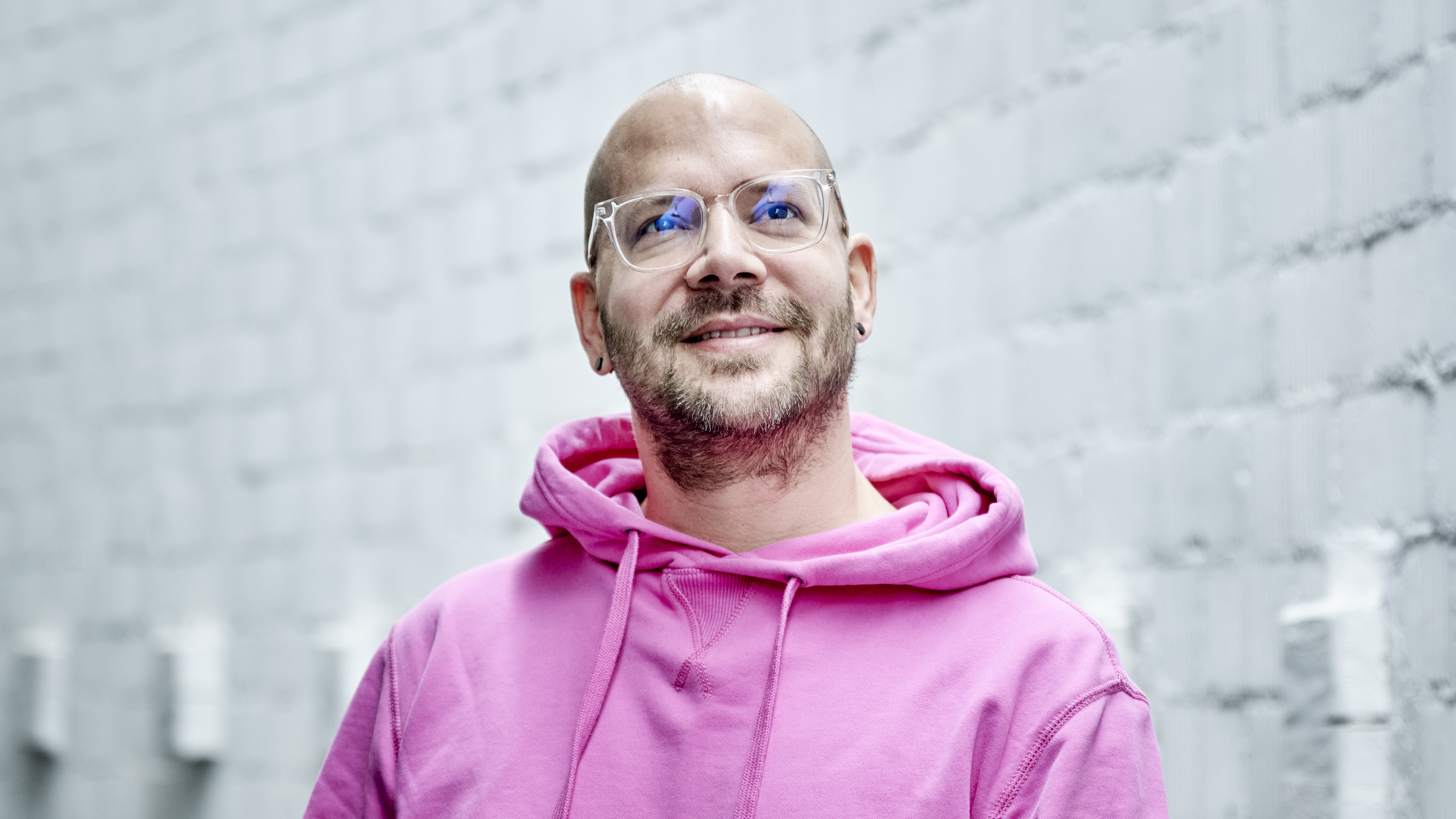
- Born: January 2, 1980 (age 46); Aarau, Canton of Aargau
- Education: University of Bern
- Scientific career
- Fields: Sociolinguistics, Sociophonetics, Dialectology
- Workplaces: University of Bern, Lancaster University, University of Cambridge, University of Zurich

Adrian Leemann (born 1980) is a Swiss linguist and phonetician, currently Professor of German Sociolinguistics at the University of Bern. He is best known for his research in dialectology, sociophonetics, and forensic phonetics, with a special focus on Swiss German and English dialects. His public-facing projects have made linguistics accessible to wide audiences through interactive apps and large-scale citizen science.

== Early life and education ==
Leemann was born in Aarau and grew up in Zofingen, in the canton of Aargau. He attended the Kantonsschule Zofingen and spent his second year of secondary school with a host family in Weyauwega, Wisconsin. He studied English linguistics and general linguistics at the University of Bern, where he completed his MA in 2005. From 2002 to 2003, he studied English linguistics at the University of Winnipeg and New York University. He received his PhD in 2009 with a dissertation on the intonation of Swiss German dialects. During his doctoral studies, he spent a research year at the University of Tokyo, funded by the Swiss National Science Foundation (SNSF). In 2017, he earned his Habilitation in German Linguistics from the University of Zurich.

== Academic career ==
After completing his doctorate, Leemann held postdoctoral positions at the Universities of Bern and Zurich. In 2014, he joined the University of Cambridge as a postdoctoral researcher, working, among other topics, on dialect variation in British English. He was appointed Assistant Professor at Lancaster University in 2017, the same year he completed his venia docendi at the University of Zurich. In 2019, Leemann was awarded an SNSF Eccellenza Professorial Fellowship, enabling him to establish his own research group at the University of Bern. He became a full professor there in 2022 and co-director of the Institute of Germanic Languages and Literatures.

== Research and contributions ==
=== Swiss German dialectology ===
In 2013, Leemann launched the Dialäkt Äpp, a smartphone app that predicted users' regional origins based on their dialectal word choices and pronunciation. The app attracted over 100,000 participants and laid the groundwork for a broader investigation into Swiss German dialect change. In 2019, his SNSF-funded project SDATS (Swiss German Dialects Across Time and Space) combined historical data with new interviews from more than 1,000 speakers. This resulted in the publication of the Dialäktatlas – 1950 bis heute in 2025, a comprehensive atlas that maps over 160 linguistic features across Switzerland, illustrating both change and continuity.

=== German dialects in Europe ===
Leemann also co-led a large-scale study of dialects in Germany, Austria, and Switzerland. In collaboration with Spiegel Online and Tages-Anzeiger, he launched an online dialect quiz titled "Grüezi, Moin, Servus", which attracted over 770,000 participants. The study showed regional dialect leveling in northern German-speaking areas and persistent differences between East and West Germany, even decades after reunification.

=== English dialectology ===
At Cambridge, Leemann contributed to the development of the English Dialects App (EDA), released in 2016. The app used user responses to predict their regional origin and collected over 30,000 data points. This data formed the English Dialects App Corpus (EDAC), one of the largest contemporary databases on British English dialects. The findings, published in Ampersand (2018), highlighted ongoing dialect leveling and increasing influence from London English, though some local accents, particularly in the northeast of England, remained resilient.

=== Sociophonetics and forensic phonetics ===
Leemann's research extends to sociophonetic factors such as how age, mobility, and personality correlate with speech variation. He has explored voice perception and speaker identification, including studies involving voice cloning and deepfake audio to simulate speech for analysis. In 2024, he co-authored An Introduction to Forensic Phonetics and Forensic Linguistics, bridging theoretical phonetics with practical applications in legal contexts.

== Selected publications ==
- Leemann, Adrian; Steiner, Carina; Studerus, Melanie; Oberholzer, Linus; Jeszenszky, Péter; Tomaschek, Fabian; Kistler, Simon (2025). Dialäktatlas: 1950 bis heute. Zollikon: vdf Hochschulverlag AG. ISBN 978-3-7281-4183-5.
- Leemann, Adrian; Elspaß, Stephan; Möller, Robert; Grossenbacher, Timo (2018). Grüezi, moin, servus! wie wir wo sprechen (Originalausgabe ed.). Reinbek bei Hamburg: Rowohlt Taschenbuch Verlag. ISBN 978-3-499-63330-0.
- Leemann, Adrian; Perkins, Ria; Buker, Grace Sullivan; Foulkes, Paul (2025). An Introduction to Forensic Phonetics and Forensic Linguistics. London New York: Routledge, Taylor & Francis Group. ISBN 978-0-367-61658-8.

== Awards and recognition ==
Leemann received the CHF 1.62 million SNSF Eccellenza Professorial Fellowship in 2019, awarded to outstanding early-career researchers. He has also received funding for projects related to dialect sound aesthetics and public linguistic engagement.

== Public engagement and media ==
Leemann's work has reached broad audiences via interactive apps, media partnerships, and science communication. The Dialäkt Äpp and EDA brought linguistic research to tens of thousands of users. His dialect studies have been featured in Spiegel Online, The Guardian, BBC News, and Swiss National Radio. He frequently contributes to public lectures and media programs, promoting awareness of dialect diversity.
