= Sally McConnell-Ginet =

American linguist (born 1938)

- Born: 1937 or 1938 (age 88–89)
- Occupation: Professor emerita
- Spouse: Carl Ginet

Academic background
- Education: Oberlin College (AB) Ohio State University (MSc) University of Rochester (PhD)

Academic work
- Discipline: Linguistics
- Institutions: Cornell University

Sally McConnell-Ginet (born 1938) is an American linguist and Professor Emerita of Linguistics at Cornell University. She is known for her work on the language of gender and sexuality.

== Education and career ==
McConnell-Ginet earned degrees in philosophy and mathematics before turning to linguistics, receiving a PhD from the University of Rochester in 1973. She joined the faculty of Cornell University in 1973, with a dual appointment in women's studies and philosophy. She went on to serve as director of Women's Studies and founding co-director of Cognitive Studies, and chair of Modern Languages and Linguistics, as well as the later Department of Linguistics.

== Honors ==
McConnell-Ginet has served as president of the International Gender and Language Association and of the Linguistic Society of America (LSA). In 2008, she was elected a fellow of the LSA and of the American Association for the Advancement of Science.

== Personal life ==
McConnell-Ginet is an avid swimmer. She swam across Lake Cayuga for a charity event the day before her 75th birthday in 2013. She is also involved in local theatre, and teaches math at a maximum security prison as part of the Cornell Prison Education Program. McConnell-Ginet is married to Cornell University Professor Emeritus Carl Ginet.

== Selected publications ==
- Sally McConnell-Ginet (1978). "Intonation in a Man's World". Signs. 3 (3). The University of Chicago Press: 541–559. doi:10.1086/493501. JSTOR 3173170. S2CID 144094979.
- Sally McConnell-Ginet (July 28, 1989). "Language and gender". In Frederick J. Newmeyer (ed.). Linguistics: The Cambridge Survey: Volume 4, Language: The Socio-Cultural Context. Cambridge University Press. pp. 75–99. ISBN 9780521375832.
- Penelope Eckert; Sally McConnell-Ginet (1992). "Think Practically and Look Locally: Language and Gender as Community- Based Practice". Annual Review of Anthropology. 21: 461–490. doi:10.1146/annurev.an.21.100192.002333. JSTOR 2155996.
- Gennaro Chierchia; Sally McConnell-Ginet (2000). Meaning and Grammar: An Introduction to Semantics. MIT Press. ISBN 9780262032698.
- Penelope Eckert; Sally McConnell-Ginet (January 9, 2003). Language and Gender. Cambridge University Press. ISBN 9780521652834.
- Sally McConnell-Ginet (February 15, 2011). Gender, Sexuality, and Meaning: Linguistic Practice and Politics. Oxford University Press. ISBN 9780195187816.
