= Mediated discourse analysis =

Specialized analysis of mediated discourse, focusing on action

Mediated discourse analysis (MDA) (coined by the late Ron Scollon) is a specialised form of linguistic discourse analysis (similar to critical discourse analysis)—it mediates discourse, agency, and practice into what Scollon calls a "nexus of practice". The goal of MDA is to focus on discourse in action, as opposed to discourse as action, thus making discourse analysts responsible for applying discourse into various practical and useful contexts.

Scollon (2001) suggests that MDA could be conceptually located in the middle of a methodological spectrum. At one end of the spectrum would lie CDA and its focus on how wider discourses in the social realm affect language used by actors: whilst at the other end of this spectrum would feature conversation analysis, with its highly detailed focus on linguistic construction. MDA by contrast, has an explicit focus on action, rather than discourse, and therefore perhaps has a greater capacity than CDA, and other connected methods to explore how social practices are formed and developed.

The antecedent of MDA is Activity Theory, which was formulated by the Russian cultural psychologist Lev Vygotsky. Activity Theory, and hence MDA, assumes that all social actions are mediated through tools, external artifacts, or internal processes within the individual. MDA shares some principles with Critical Discourse Analysis (CDA); however, it has a distinct focus on action and sees discourse as just one among many potential mediational means (Scollon 2001).

Ron Scollon developed the six central concepts around which MDA is organised (Scollon 2001):

1. Mediated action

2. Site of engagement

3. Mediational means

4. Practice and mediational means

5. Nexus of practice

6. Community of practice

Mediated Action. The fundamental unit of analysis of MDA is the mediated action, and the notion that there is no action without some form of mediational means, these being the means by which is action is communicated or carried out.

Sites of engagement: Sites of engagement are points in space and time. These facilitate the intersection of social practice and mediational means that enables a mediated action to occur (Scollon 2001a). No action or site of engagement is defined by a unique practice; hence MDA could reveal the intersection of different practices across space and time via different trajectories (de Saint-George 2005). Researchers and participants can jointly construct sites of engagement, referred to as space-time stations (de Saint-George 2005).

Mediational means. Mediational means is the semiotic means by which an action is carried out: Semiosis in the MDA terminology includes both language and text but also material objects that have been appropriated for the purpose of the social action (Scollon 2001a). MDA has a much narrower view of practice than is often referred to in the field of practice; in terms of scale, practice is seen as a “single recognisable repeatable action” (Scollon & Scollon 2007 p. 13), as opposed to, for example, ‘training practice’. MDA has a concrete link to the social practice theory developed by Bourdieu, in that Scollon (2001a, p. 149) defines practice as “a historical accumulation within the habitus/historical body of the social actor of mediated actions taken over his or her life (experience) and which are recognizable to other social actors as ‘the same’ social action.” Scollon (2001a) also conceptualises that practice is configured, as ‘chains of mediated actions’, but these actions themselves could form part of other social practices. MDA is designed to illicit how individuals both recognise, and construe, these chains of actions. At a more granular level, and using a different dimension of consideration, Scollon (2001a, p. 162) outlines that MDA researchers must “necessarily conceive of any mediated action as one which is constituted of lower level actions, and which, in turn, constitutes higher level actions.” This consideration results in a potential hierarchy of actions; which provides a significant mechanism for the analytical steps within the methodology.

Nexus of practice: The concept of the nexus of practice is defined as the intersection of multiple practices of groups of mediated actions (Scollon 2001). The concept is rooted in two interdependent ideas: the recognition of repeatable linkages of actions by actors, and the ability to enact that those practices, as Scollon (2001a, p. 150) expresses, a nexus is; “any group who can and do engage in some action”

Community of practice. The final concept of MDA is that of community of practice. Scollon (2001a, p. 150) considers this be relevant within MDA when a nexus of practice becomes “explicitly recognised as a group”. Again this is a narrower definition than is often associated with the term, and Scollon (2001a) himself was critical of what he saw as overuse and simplification of the notion of a community of practice, particularly as popularised in the management literature (for example, see van Winkelen, 2016; Lee & Oh, 2013; McGuire & Garavan, 2013).

MDA scholars typically utilize a set of heuristic Questions and Jones et al. 2017 developed these into a structured analytical pathway to help researchers.

- What is the action?
- What chain or chain of actions are important?
- What is the relevance or importance of the action in the sequence?
- What is the hierarchy of actions?
- What are the practices which intersect to produce this site of engagement?
- What histories in habitus do these practices have?
- In what other actions are these practices formative?
- What are anticipatory and retrospective discourses – that could provide a meta-discursive structure?
- What mediational means are used in this action?
- What specific forms of analysis should be used in analysing the mediational means?
- How and when where those mediational means appropriated within the practice?
- How are those mediational means used in this action?

The MDA scholar, de Saint-George (2005) conceptualises practices, mediational means, and people, as having trajectories which intersect at space/time stations; and where sites of engagement can ‘open up’. This form of analysis can then help researchers look for the history of the practice and other potential site of engagement, and hence other nexus of interest.

The flexibility of MDA can be seen in three ways; A choice of focal depth in terms of the practice(s) being explored; a choice of methods depending on the context; and the flexibility that results from establishing a large potential bank of mediational means, so as to afford the researcher choice in exploring different areas of concern or interest.

The scale and scope of the analysis within MDA, means a richer field for potential theorizing. The alignment of MDA to the practice perspective, and the need for establishing mediational means partly via a thematic analysis, ensures linkages back to the literature.

The data collection involved in MDA is relatively straightforward, with perhaps the exception of the desirability to record events at the site of engagement, which might result in access issues in some cases. However, the analysis of the data is time-consuming for two reasons. The first reason is the sheer quantity of analytical resources needed to answer the heuristic questions (outlined in figure 7). This includes thematic analysis of the two interview sets, the construction of transcripts for the event episodes, the construction of action hierarchy tables, as well as the interrogation of the interview data for trajectories of practice. Secondly, the latter two analytical steps mentioned previously require meticulous and fastidious work and do not lend themselves to be done using analytical software.

As a result of the need to understand all the relevant trajectories of practice and the bank of mediational means that transpire to intersect and appear at a site of engagement, a deep and wide-ranging understanding of the social realm of an organisation can be obtained from a single locus of study. Hence the large amount of analytical work involved in MDA can yield a significant theoretical return on a smaller amount of fieldwork, possibly useful in situations where access is problematic or time limited.

MDA is realized in practice through the research strategy of nexus analysis which is suitable for studying complex, evolving processes in order to shed light on social action not only in situ but also as reaching across long-span timescales. Nexus analysis is used also in fields other than linguistic studies. Examples of studies using nexus analysis have focused on micro perspectives but also on issues on macro level, e.g. when interpreting video diaries produced by children (Iivari et al., 2014), studying popular media as a pervasive educative force (Wohlwend & Medina, 2012), and building an information infrastructure in a city (Halkola et al., 2012), service interaction (Izadi, 2017, 2020).

== See also ==
- Interactional sociolinguistics
- Mediated communication
