= Carl Ginet =

American philosopher

Carl Ginet (born 1932) is an American philosopher and Professor Emeritus at Cornell University. His work is primarily in action theory, moral responsibility, free will, and epistemology.

Ginet received his BA from Occidental College in 1954, and his Ph.D. from Cornell in 1960 with a dissertation titled "Reasons, Causes, and Free Will". He joined the Sage School of Philosophy at Cornell in 1971 and retired in 1999. Before Cornell, Ginet was a faculty member of various universities, including Ohio State University, University of Michigan, and University of Rochester.

Ginet is married to Cornell University Professor Emerita Sally McConnell-Ginet.

== Selected publications ==
=== Books ===
- Knowledge, Perception, and Memory (1975), Kluwer Academic Print on Demand. ISBN 90-277-0574-7, ISBN 978-90-277-0574-7
- On Action (1990), Cambridge University Press. ISBN 0-521-38818-X, 9780521388184

=== Articles ===
- "Might We Have No Choice?" in Freedom and Determinism, ed. K. Lehrer (1966).
- "An Incoherence in the Tractatus", Canadian Journal of Philosophy (1973).
- "Wittgenstein's Claim that there Could Not Be Just One Occasion of Obeying a Rule", in Essays on Wittgenstein in Honour of G.H.von Wright, Acta Philosophica Fennica (1976).
- "Performativity", Linguistics and Philosophy (1979).
- "Contra Reliabilism", The Monist (1985).
- "The Fourth Condition", in Philosophical Analysis, ed. D.F. Austin (1988).
- "Dispositionalism: A Defense Against Kripke's Criticisms", Midwest Studies in Philosophy, Vol. XVII (1992).
- "In Defense of the Principle of Alternative Possibilities: Why I Don't Find Frankfurt's Argument Convincing", in Tomberlin ed., Philosophical Perspectives 10: Metaphysics (1996).
- "Freedom, Responsibility, and Agency", The Journal of Ethics I, pp. 85–98.
