= Jocks and Burnouts =

1989 study by Penelope Eckert

- Author: Penelope Eckert
- Subject: Anthropology of education
- Published: 1989 (Teachers College Press)
- Pages: 208

Jocks and Burnouts: Social Categories and Identity in the High School is a 1989 book-length ethnographic study of social class in a high school in the Detroit suburbs written by sociolinguist Penelope Eckert.
