= Mediated communication =

Mediated communication or mediated interaction (less often, mediated discourse) refers to communication carried out by the use of information communication technology and can be contrasted to face-to-face communication. While nowadays the technology we use is often related to computers, giving rise to the popular term computer-mediated communication, mediated technology need not be computerized as writing a letter using a pen and a piece of paper is also using mediated communication. Thus, Davis defines mediated communication as the use of any technical medium for transmission across time and space.

Historically, mediated communication was much rarer than the face-to-face method. Even though humans possessed the technology to communicate in space and time for millennia, the majority of the world's population lacked skills such as literacy to use them. This began to change in Europe with the invention of the printing press by Johannes Gutenberg that led to the spread of printed texts and rising literacy from the 15th century. Separately, the first print culture was Chinese in origin. Whatever the tradition, face-to-face interaction has begun to steadily lose ground to mediated communication.

Compared to face-to-face communication, mediated communication engages fewer senses, transmits fewer symbolic cues (most mediated communication does not transmit facial expressions) and is seen as more private. Parties usually require some technical expertise to operate the mediating technologies. New computerized media, such as mobile telephones or instant messaging, allow mediated communication to transmit more oral and nonverbal symbols than the older generation of tools.

The type of mediated technology used can also influence its meaning. This is most famously rendered in Marshall McLuhan's maxim "the medium is the message".

Lundby (2009) distinguished between three forms of mediated communication: mediated interpersonal communication, interactive communication, and mass communication. Thompson (1995), however, treated mass communication not as a part of mediated communication, but on par with mediated and face-to-face communication, terming it "mediated quasi-interaction".

== Differences from face-to-face communication ==
There are only a few ways that mediated communication and face-to-face communication function similarly. One of them is that interpersonal coordination is present in both face-to-face and mediated communication. However, mediated communication has vast differences and limitations compared with face-to-face communication. Writing in communication media and speech in face-to-face communication are different in terms of their lexical density, range of grammatical structures, varied connectivity between sentences, syntax, permanence, etc. These differences in each type of communication can change the message. Texting and e-mail, for example, contain combined forms of writing and speech, which is evident by slang and shorthand. Verbal (or textual) cues are used instead of nonverbal ones to convey the same messages.

Individuals send more information at a time through computer media than any other form of communication, including face-to-face communication. This increased rate of information transfer allows abusive forms of communication like cyberbullying and phishing to occur. The dissociation and disinhibition associated with mediated communication can cause people who are being deceived to have trouble interpreting the reactions of the deceiver since information sent through media instead of face-to-face can lose or have change the nonverbal cues within it, and, with that, signs of deception. The decreased availability of these nonverbal cues increases disassociation and anonymity. It is easier to trust someone else through mediated communication, but people with less trust can detect deception better online.

Because of the limitations of mediated communication, Nardi and Whittaker (2002) note, "Many theorists imply that face-to-face communication is the gold standard of communication." Mediated communication has been, however, described as preferable in some situations, particularly where time and geographical distance are an issue. For example, in maintaining long-distance friendship, face-to-face communication was only the fourth most common way of maintaining ties, after mediated communication tools of telephone, email and instant messaging.

== Uses ==
Individuals will use different types of media depending on their motivations, communication purpose, institutional factors, and situational factors. Also, people will be more inclined to use a particular medium of communication if others associated with them use that medium; this is called the network effect. Motivations for using certain media are divided into strong- and weak-tie communication. There are five communication purposes: coordination, knowledge-sharing, information gathering, relationship development, and conflict resolution. Institutional factors include the physical structure of work units, social structure, and incentives. Situational factors include task characteristics, message content, and urgency.

Mediated communication is not as commonly used as face-to-face communication in the workplace, but there are different preferred media of communication for simple forms of coordination. E-mails and phone calls tend to be used for simple or complex coordination, but e-mails are also useful for retaining information and recording the exchange of information. In terms of communication solutions to certain situational factors, e-mails are used for recording the transfer of information and sending long, complex, and non-textual information, and phone calls and pagers are used for immediate communication. E-mails and phone calls are also used in knowledge sharing and information gathering. E-mails are rarely used to accomplish relationship goals, but they are used for conflict resolution. Individuals have a higher motivation to use cell-phone texting for weak-tie communication. The network effect has the most impact on e-mail, meaning that people tend to use e-mail more if their peers use it too.

== Types of mediated communication ==
Writing

Mediated communication in the form of writing has a long history dating back to the invention of writing in Mesopotamia and Ancient Egypt

The development of the codex, a book-like medium for the production of written texts, extended the portability of mediated communication. In Euro-Asia this then led to the production of books and manuscripts reproduced by hand.

Print

In the 15th century the invention of the printing press in Europe led to large scale production and circulation of information and symbolic content in various formats and genres including religious texts, fiction and non-fiction books, political pamphlets, journal articles, reports and government publications, and newspapers.

Mediated communication also includes telecommunications, radio, film, television and digital technologies.

Email

Electronic mail is digital mechanism for exchanging messages through internet or intranet communication platforms. The first message that was sent through a computer was on October 29, 1969, by Raymond Tomlinson.

Text message

A text message is defined as a short message sent electronically usually from one cellphone to another. The first text message was sent on December 3, 1992, developed by Finnish engineer Matti Makkonen.

== See also ==
- Mediated cross-border communication
- Mediated discourse analysis
- Digital media
- Social media
- Media richness theory
- Social presence theory
