= Alice Louise Davison =

American linguist

- Born: September 10, 1940; Washington, D.C., U.S.
- Died: March 3, 2017 (aged 76); Iowa City, Iowa, U.S.

Academic background
- Education: Bryn Mawr College (BA); University of Chicago (PhD)
- Thesis: Performative Verbs, Adverbs and Felicity Conditions: an Inquiry Into the Nature of Performative Verbs

Academic work
- Discipline: Linguist
- Sub-discipline: Syntax; Semantics; Hindustani language

Alice Davison (born Washington, D.C., September 10, 1940, died Iowa City, Iowa, March 3, 2017) was an American linguist who specialized in the syntax of South Asian languages, in particular Hindustani.

== Early life and education ==
Davison grew up in Washington, D.C. She graduated from the Potomac School in McLean, Virginia in 1955, and the Madeira School in McLean in 1958. She then went to Bryn Mawr College in Bryn Mawr, Pennsylvania, graduating in 1962. She received her PhD from the University of Chicago in 1972, writing her dissertation on performative verbs.

== Career ==
After completing her PhD, Davison started her teaching career at The State University of New York at Stony Brook. She also taught at the University of Illinois at Urbana-Champaign and the University of Wisconsin. The majority of her academic career was spent at the University of Iowa where she held a faculty position in the Department of Linguistics from 1988 until she retired in 2016.

Davison's primary areas of study included syntax and semantics, in particular of Hindi-Urdu and other South Asian languages. She was a regular participant in the South Asian Languages Analysis Roundtable (SALA), and a special session in her honor was organized at SALA 2018, held at the University of Konstanz. Among other honors, she was a Senior Research Fellow at the American Institute of Indian Studies in Varanasi, India, and she taught and conducted research at the Central Institute of English and Foreign Languages in Hyderabad.

Davison spent 1989–1990 at Cornell University with a National Science Foundation Visiting Professorship for Women. While at Cornell, she organized a conference on the status of women in linguistics and co-edited a volume of papers from the conference (Davison & Eckert 1990).

== Selected publications ==
- Davison, Alice. 1984. Syntactic markedness and the definition of sentence topic. Language, vol. 60 no. 4, pp. 797–846.
- Davison, Alice & Penelope Eckert, eds. 1990. The Cornell Lectures: Women in the Linguistics Profession. Published by the committee on the Status of Women in Linguistics, Linguistic Society of America.
- Davison, Alice. 2004a. Structural case, Lexical case and the verbal projection. In V. Dayal and A. Mahajan (eds), Clause Structure in South Asian Languages. Dordrecht: Kluwer, pp. 199–225.
- Davison, Alice. 2004b. Non-nominative subjects in Hindi/Urdu: VP structure and case parameters. In P. Bhaskararao and K.V. Subbarao (eds.), Non-nominative Subjects, Volume 1. Amsterdam: Benjamins, pp. 141–168.
- Davison, Alice. 2015. Hindi/Urdu: central syntactic issues. In Tibor Kiss and Aretmis Alexiadou (eds.), Syntax– Theory and Analysis. An International Handbook. Handbooks of Linguistics and Communication Science 42.1-3. Berlin: Mouton de Gruyter.
