= Gender role in language =

Language

Many languages have distinct sets of enunciation and/or of writing, dependent on whether the speaker or writer be a man or a woman. In such situations, the language may be said to exhibit (at least) two genderlects.

== Origins ==
Many genderlects arise from gender-specific social practices. For example:

- Irish Sign Language developed separate male and female vocabularies, because it was primarily taught in single-sex schools.
- Some Australian Aboriginal communities, such as the Warlpiri, have auxiliary sign languages which are primarily used by older women. Men typically know a few signs, but do not sign extensively. This distinction has emerged because women observe a speech taboo during mourning and learn sign to communicate during this period, although they continue to use the language with other women even after the taboo is lifted.
- Some tribes found in western Victoria (Australia) prohibit a man and woman from marrying if they speak the same language. During initial visits in this arrangement, neither people are allowed the speak the dialect of the tribe that he or she is visiting.
- It is speculated that Sumerian women had a special language called Emesal, distinct from the main language, Emegir, which was spoken by both genders. The women's language had a distinct vocabulary, found in the records of religious rituals to be performed by women, also in the speech of goddesses in mythological texts. There has been some dispute about the role of Emesal, with suggestions by some scholars that Emegir was a dialect used by the public and more informally while Emesal was a literary language.
- "the Suaheli have for every object which they do not care to mention by its real name a symbolic word understood by everybody concerned. In especial such symbols are used by women in their mysteries to denote obscene things. The words chosen are either ordinary names for innocent things or else taken from the old language or other Bantu languages, mostly Kiziguha, for among the Waziguha secret rites play an enormous role."

In other cases, a genderlect may indicate class- and gender-mediated linguistic conservatism. For example:

- In ancient India, the formal language Sanskrit diverged from the popular Prakrit languages. However, some Sanskrit plays recorded the speech of women, illiterates, and low-caste men in Prakrit, and all other characters in Sanskrit.
- In Ancient Greek, there is evidence for some difference between the speech of men and women, as evidenced for example in the comedies of Aristophanes.
- In describing the early-20th-century Castilianization of Basque Country, Jespersen noted that "There are families in which the wife talks Basque, while the husband does not even understand Basque and does not allow his children to learn it". Likewise, "the old Livonian language, which is now nearly extinct, is kept up with the greatest fidelity by the women, while the men are abandoning it for Lettish."

== Common features ==
=== Vocabulary differences ===
Some natural languages have intricate systems of gender-specific vocabulary.

Garifuna has a vocabulary split between terms used only by men and terms used only by women. This does not however affect the entire vocabulary but when it does, the terms used by men generally come from Carib and those used by women come from Arawak. Crawley summarizes the situation as: "the earliest observation of a difference between the language of men and that of women was apparently that of Raymond Breton ... in Guadéloupe and Dominica. ... it seems that the island Carib have two distinct vocabularies, and used by men and by women when speaking to men, and the other used by women when speaking to each other, and by men when repeating in oratio obliqua some saying of the women."

Crawley in fact noted extensive examples amongst indigenous American languages. "In the language of the Abipones some words varied according to sex." "Of the Guaycurus of the Gran Chaco ... "... the speech of the men is wholly, or at least in certain words, different from that of the men." The Karaya have a special women’s dialect ... . The Eskimo women of the Mackenzie Delta have a special expressions, words, and terminations which the men do not use." In the Lesser Antilles, "words special to one or the other sex are found most frequently in the names of the various degrees of kinship; thus, ... for maternal uncle, son (elder son, younger son), brother-in-law, wife, mother, grandmother, daughter, cousin all of these are different according as a man or a woman is speaking. It is the same with the names of some though far from all, of the different parts of the body". "Similar gender-associated languages" include Yanomama.

=== Enunciation ===
Other natural languages may have mutually intelligible genderlects, but with certain words pronounced differently.

Jespersen writes that "In France, about 1700, women were inclined to pronounce e instead of o ... . ... in the sixteenth century in France there was a tendency to leave off the trilling and even to go further than to the present English untrilled point r by pronouncing [z] instead, but some of the old grammarians mention this pronunciation as characteristic of women". Likewise, for "the English sound system we have express statements by old grammarians that women had a more advanced pronunciation than men, and characteristically enough these statements refer to the raising of the vowels in the direction of [i]".

The indigenous Australian language Yanyuwa has separate dialects for men and women.

In eastern Siberia, "Chukchi women's language differs from the Chukchi men's variety in a number of synchronically unpredictable ways, particularly with respect to an alternation between r and c/č. ... this alternation is nonarbitrary, originating from the asymmetric collapse of three cognate sets into two, such that in men's Chukchi *r and *d > r and *c > č, whereas in women's Chukchi *r > r and *d and *c > c."

=== Grammatical production ===
In the Lakota language, a small number of enclitics (approximately eight) differ in form based on the gender of the speaker. While many native speakers and linguists agree that certain enclitics are associated with particular genders, such usage may not be exclusive. That is, individual men sometimes use enclitics associated with women, and vice versa. "With the Chiquitos in Bolivia, ... men indicate by the addition of -tii that a male person is spoken about, while the women do not use this suffix and thus make no distinction between 'he' and 'she,' 'his' and 'her.' ... To many substantives the men prefix a vowel which the women do not employ. {Cf. the difference between Yoruba of Nigeria and Fǫn of Dahomey, in that Yoruba prefixes to many substantives a vowel which Fǫn does not employ.}

=== Writing systems ===
"The robes of buffalo hide on which a great deal of picture writing was done were all wrought by women, and ... among the Plains Indians the women have a picture language unknown to the men."

Nüshu was a Chinese script used solely by women.

== See also ==
- Language and gender
