= Sociocultural linguistics =

Study of language in sociocultural context

Sociocultural linguistics is a term used to encompass a broad range of theories and methods for the study of language in its sociocultural context. Its growing use is a response to the increasingly narrow association of the term sociolinguistics with specific types of research involving the quantitative analysis of linguistic features and their correlation to sociological variables. The term as it is currently used not only clarifies this distinction, but highlights an awareness of the necessity for transdisciplinary approaches to language, culture and society.

The scope of sociocultural linguistics, as described by researchers such as Kira Hall and Mary Bucholtz, is potentially vast, though often includes work drawing from disciplines such as sociolinguistics, linguistic anthropology, discourse analysis, and sociology of language, as well as certain streams of social psychology, folklore studies, media studies, social and literary theory, and the philosophy of language.

== Historical precedents ==
Sociocultural linguists, especially in the United States, take an interdisciplinary approach to the study of language and the social and cultural functions of language use. Although generative and cognitive linguistics have been dominant in the United States since the mid-twentieth century, American linguists have periodically proposed to bring their studies closer to other fields of social inquiry. For example, in 1929, Edward Sapir urged linguists to move beyond diachronic and formal analyses for their own sake and to "become aware of what their science may mean for the interpretation of human conduct in general" (1929:207).

It is peculiarly important that linguists, who are often accused, and accused justly, of failure to look beyond the pretty patterns of their subject matter, should become aware of what their science may mean for the interpretation of human conduct in general. Whether they like it or not, they must become increasingly concerned with the many anthropological, sociological, and psychological problems which invade the field of language. [Sapir 1929:214]

Forty years later, Dell Hymes (1964) lamented that the socially integrated linguistics Sapir had called for was disappearing. It was he who coined the term "linguistic anthropology." Sociolinguistics is now the most common term for linguistics relating to the field of anthropology. Hymes and others worried that new formal approaches, as well as the push for linguistics as an autonomous field, threatened to once again isolate linguists. At the same time, though, the growth of ethnolinguistics and sociolinguistics offered a venue for the socially engaged linguistics Sapir had called for four decades earlier.

After four more decades, just as Hymes (1964) worried that linguistics had been bleached of its association with the study of human interaction in the wake of formalist studies, scholars noted that sociolinguistics in turn had narrowed to denote only specific types of study. Sociocultural linguistics is thus "the broad interdisciplinary field concerned with the intersection of language, culture, and society" (Bucholtz and Hall 2005: 5).
