= Language in Society =

- Discipline: Sociolinguistics
- Language: English
- Edited by: Susan Ehrlich & Tommaso Milani

Publication details
- History: 1972–present
- Publisher: Cambridge University Press (United Kingdom)
- Frequency: 5/year
- Impact factor: 2.1 (2025)

Standard abbreviations
- ISO 4: Lang. Soc.

Indexing
- ISSN: 0047-4045 (print); 1469-8013 (web)
- LCCN: 72623747
- OCLC no.: 299393484

Links
- Journal homepage

Language in Society is a peer-reviewed academic journal of sociolinguistics. It was established in 1972 and is published five times a year by Cambridge University Press. The current editors in chief are Susan Ehrlich (York University) and Tommaso Milani (University of Gothenburg). It has a circulation of 1900.

According to the Journal Citation Reports, the journal's 2025 impact factor is 2.1, ranking it 77th out of 312 journals in the category "Linguistics," and 68th out of 222 journals in the category "Sociology."

== Aims and scope ==
The journal treats language and communication in the context of social life. Apart from sociolinguistics, its scope encompasses also related fields, such as linguistic anthropology. Taking an international perspective, the journal aims at encouraging discussion among researchers and disciplines.
