= Interactional sociolinguistics =

Interactional sociolinguistics is a subdiscipline of linguistics that uses discourse analysis to study how language users create meaning via social interaction. It is one of the ways in which linguists look at the intersections of human language and human society; other subfields that take this perspective are language planning, minority language studies, quantitative sociolinguistics, and sociohistorical linguistics, among others. Interactional sociolinguistics is a theoretical and methodological framework within the discipline of linguistic anthropology, which combines the methodology of linguistics with the cultural consideration of anthropology in order to understand how the use of language informs social and cultural interaction. Interactional sociolinguistics was founded by linguistic anthropologist John J. Gumperz. Topics that might benefit from an Interactional sociolinguistic analysis include: cross-cultural miscommunication, politeness, and framing.

== John J. Gumperz ==
John J. Gumperz was an integral figure in the solidification of anthropology as an academic discipline and in the creation of the interdisciplinary field of linguistic anthropology. Born in 1922 he was able to play a crucial role in setting up how future scholars looked at language, culture, and social meaning. Gumperz conducted ethnographic work around the world as well as teaching at many esteemed universities in the United States. He worked with several great thinkers across disciplines (including: psychology, sociology, linguistics, anthropology) in order to establish his framework around Interactional sociolinguistics.

== In Practice ==
In terms of research methods, interactional sociolinguists analyze audio or video recordings of conversations or other interactions. Concerning the methodology of discourse analysis, by which instances of interactional sociolinguistics can be isolated, there are many ways in which language can be analyzed. Though Gumperz pioneered his framework several decades ago it is still being used by anthropologists today in their research.

Oftentimes researchers will focus on specific linguistic components. Some focus on specific word use including connotation and indexicality. An example of an anthropologist who employed this type of methodology in her work is Deborah Schiffrin who isolated 12 words to analyze in her study of Jewish communities and their use of speech in Philadelphia. Linguistic analysis, methods such as examining linguistic structures and the roles they play within conversational discourse, play a large role in using discourse analysis to establish relational frameworks. Analysis focuses not only on linguistic forms such as words, sentences, grammar, phonology, etc. but also on subtle cues such as prosody and register that signal contextual presupposition.

Linguistic based analysis is not the only component that is useful for establishing instances of Interactional sociolinguistics. Culture also plays a large role in understanding this phenomenon. Many linguistic anthropologists have come to understand that language and culture are not separate entities, but are in fact processes that work hand in hand. These contextualization cues are culturally specific and usually unconscious. Linguistic anthropology helps make explicit the implicit features of culture that can often be unknown to the speaker. When participants in a conversation come from different cultural backgrounds they may not recognize these subtle cues in one another's speech, leading to misunderstanding. This very idea of misunderstanding, contextualization, and culture, has been widely explored using Gumperz's framework of Interactional sociolinguistics. One of the main ways that Gumperz's framework is often utilized is in the context of jokes and how, when and why they are used by a specific culture in conversation. One anthropologist who has conducted research using the methodology of interactional sociolinguistics is Catherine Evans Davies. She uses it her ethnographic research to understand how beginning language learners start to make sense of social interaction in that language by using jokes in conversation with native speakers. In her work she discusses the usefulness of Gumperz's theory in her methodology as it stresses conversational analysis for the purpose of interpreting different linguistic practices, in this case humor and joking. Jokes, and humor are not the only area in which interactional sociolinguistic discourse analysis is useful. It is a valid and effective research framework for anyone interested in how language interacts with culture and meaning. Karen Grainger utilized it in her work involving relationships between care givers the elderly. In her article Reality Orientation in Institutions for the Elderly: The Perspective from Interactional Sociolinguistics, Karen Grainger uses Interactional sociolinguistics to push back against a process of elder therapy called "Reality Orientation." In this piece Grainger uses discourse analysis to examine some of the scripts and modes of speech that the therapists abide by. Utilizing Gumperz's framework this way that showed that this type of therapy is perhaps creating a bigger divide between patients and staff. Here Grainger uses Interactional sociolinguistics to understand how power structures are established and maintained, whether deliberately or unwittingly. The theories behind Interactional sociolinguistics have no limit to the fields and areas of study to which they can be applied, for they provide answers to the ever present question of the relationship between culture and language.

== Notable Practitioners of Interactional Sociolinguistics ==
- Gregory Bateson
- Dwight Bolinger
- Penelope Brown
- Wallace Chafe
- Frederick Erickson
- Erving Goffman
- John J. Gumperz
- Adam Kendon
- Robin Lakoff
- Stephen Levinson
- Deborah Tannen
- Andrew Pawley
- Ron Scollon

== See also ==
- Code-switching
- Conversation analysis
- Ethnography of communication
- Mediated discourse analysis
- Pragmatics
- Schismogenesis in sociolinguistics
- sociolinguistics
