= Ron Scollon =

- Born: 1939
- Died: January 1, 2009; Seattle, WA, United States

Ron Scollon (May 13, 1939 – January 1, 2009), was a professor of linguistics at Georgetown University (1998–2004) and the author (often in collaboration with his wife, Suzanne Wong Scollon) of 16 books and over 80 articles on intercultural communication and discourse analysis. He was perhaps best known for his work in the area of interethnic communication.

His Ph.D., granted in 1974 by the University of Hawaii, was in the area of child language acquisition. During his time at the University of Hawaii, he also worked with linguist Li Fang-Kuei on a series of Chipewyan texts that Li had recorded in collaboration with storyteller François Mandeville during a visit to Fort Chipewyan, Alberta in 1928. A transcription and translation of these texts was published by the Academia Sinica in 1976. Scollon came back to the Mandeville stories near the end of his life, seeking to translate the stories as stories, more than (or in addition to) as data for linguistic analysis. This second translation was published posthumously under the title This is What They Say (François Mandeville, ed. and trans. Ron Scollon, Vancouver: Douglas & McIntyre, 2009).

Scollon's work with Li Fang-Kuei on the Mandeville stories led to a period of fieldwork in Fort Chipewyan in 1976–1977. During this period, the Scollons became interested in the ways in which different interactive styles—in the case of Fort Chipewyan, people socialized to an oral narrative discourse encountering people socialized to a discourse grounded in literacy and the European Enlightenment—can lead to misunderstanding and discrimination. This work led Scollon to take a job in 1979 with the Alaska Native Language Center at the University of Alaska, Fairbanks, where he contributed to the development of lexicons and educational materials for several Athabaskan languages in interior Alaska. He also taught in the education program, where in addition to working with education students face to face in a traditional classroom setting, he (together with Suzanne Wong Scollon) developed methods to conduct courses by email and audioconference with students distributed across several of the University of Alaska's satellite facilities.

This academic work led to consulting work in the area of interethnic communication with various agencies such as school districts and law enforcement agencies throughout Alaska. After a move to the rural community of Haines, Alaska, in 1983, Scollon served on the Haines Borough School Board and Borough Assembly for several years. Fieldwork and teaching in Taiwan and in South Korea allowed the Scollons to develop a deeper understanding of a third major discourse system, contrasting with the Athabaskan and Euro-American discourse patterns they had described in their earlier work. This triangle of contrasting discourse systems was the grounding for the methodological work Scollon focused on during his period on the faculty of City University of Hong Kong, from 1992 to 1998.

Following his retirement from Georgetown University in 2004, Scollon returned to Haines, Alaska. The last months of his life were spent in Seattle, Washington.

== See also ==
- Mediated discourse analysis
