= Kira Hall =

American linguist

Academic background
- Education: UC Berkeley
- Thesis: (1995)

Academic work
- Institutions: University of Colorado at Boulder, Department of Linguistics and Department of Anthropology
- Main interests: Sociocultural linguistics
- Notable works: Language and woman's place: text and commentaries
- Notable ideas: Tactics of intersubjectivity
- Website: University of Colorado at Boulder

Kira Hall is Distinguished Professor of Linguistics and Anthropology, as well as director for the Program in Culture, Language, and Social Practice (CLASP), at the University of Colorado at Boulder.

The majority of Hall's work focuses on language in India and the United States, with special attention to organizations of gender and sexuality. A special focus of her work has been the linguistic and sociocultural practices of Hindi-speaking Hijras in northern India, a nonbinary group often discussed in the anthropological literature as a "third sex."

She is known for her contributions to research on language and identity within sociocultural linguistics, and especially the tactics of intersubjectivity framework developed with Mary Bucholtz.

== Education ==
Hall received her Ph.D. in linguistics in 1995 from the University of California at Berkeley, writing her dissertation under the supervision of Robin Lakoff, and has held academic positions at Stanford, Yale, and Rutgers Universities.

== Designations ==
=== Awards ===
- College Scholar Award in 2014
- Provost Faculty Achievement Award in 2010
- Boulder Faculty Assembly Teaching Excellence Award in 2009
- Outstanding Faculty Advisor Award in 2004.

=== Positions held ===
- President, Society for Linguistic Anthropology (2019–2021)
- Professor, CU Boulder Department of Linguistics
- Professor, CU Boulder Department of Anthropology
- CU Boulder Associate Chair Of Undergraduate Studies, department Of linguistics
- Affiliated faculty, CU Boulder College of Media, Communication, and Information (CMCI)
- Affiliated faculty, Cu Boulder Department Of Women And Gender Studies (WGST)
- Director, CU Boulder Program In Culture, Language, And Social Practice
- Director, CU Boulder Literacy Practicum

== Selected publications ==
=== Books ===
- Hall, Kira; Bucholtz, Mary (1995) [1975]. Gender articulated: language and the socially constructed self. New York: Routledge. ISBN 9780415913997.
- Livia, Anna, and Kira Hall, eds. 1997. Queerly Phrased: Language, Gender, and Sexuality. New York: Oxford University Press. [480 pp.]
- Hall, Kira, ed. 2007. Essays in Indian Folk Traditions: Collected Writings of Ved Prakash Vatuk. Meerut, India: Archana Publications. [472 pp.]
- Hall, Kira, ed. 2009. Studies in Inequality and Social Justice: Essays in Honor of Ved Prakash Vatuk. Meerut, India: Archana Publications. [449 pp.]
- Hall, Kira; Barrett, Rusty, eds. 2018. Language and sexuality. Oxford Handbooks Online. DOI:10.1093/oxfordhb/9780190212926.001.0001
- Hall, Kira, ed. 2023. Lifelong Search for Home: Collected English Poems of Ved Prakash Vatuk. New Delhi: New World Publication. [390 pp]

=== Book chapters ===
- Hall, Kira; Bucholtz, Mary (1995), "Introduction: Twenty years after Language and Woman's Place", in Hall, Kira; Bucholtz, Mary (eds.), Gender articulated: language and the socially constructed self, New York: Routledge, pp. 1–24, ISBN 9780415913997. Pdf.

=== Journal articles ===
- Hall, Kira (1999). Performativity. Journal of Linguistic Anthropology 9(1-2): 184-187. doi:10.1525/jlin.1999.9.1-2.184.
- Bucholtz, Mary, and Kira Hall (2004). Theorizing Identity in Language and Sexuality Research. Language in Society 33(4): 469-515. doi: 10.1017/S0047404504334020
- Hall, Kira (2005). Intertextual Sexuality: Parodies of Class, Identity, and Desire in Liminal Delhi. Journal of Linguistic Anthropology 15(1): 125-144. doi: 10.1525/jlin.2005.15.1.125.
- Hall, Kira; Bucholtz, Mary (October 2005). "Identity and interaction: a sociocultural linguistic approach". Discourse Studies. 7 (4–5): 585–614. doi:10.1177/1461445605054407. S2CID 27020925. Pdf.

=== Edited proceedings ===
- Hall, Kira, Michael Meacham, and Richard Shapiro, eds. 1989. General Session and Parasession on Theoretical Issues in Language Reconstruction: Proceedings of the Fifteenth Annual Meeting of the Berkeley Linguistics Society, 1988-1989. Berkeley: Berkeley Linguistics Society, Inc. [431 pp.]
- Hall, Kira, Jean Pierre Koenig, Michael Meacham, Sondra Reinman, and Laurel Sutton, eds. 1990. General Session and Parasession on the Legacy of Grice: Proceedings of the Sixteenth Annual Meeting of the Berkeley Linguistics Society, 1989-1990. Berkeley: Berkeley Linguistics Society, Inc. [559 pp.]
- Hall, Kira, Mary Bucholtz, and Birch Moonwomon, eds. 1992. Locating Power: Proceedings of the Second Berkeley Women and Language Conference, Vol. 2. Berkeley: Berkeley Women & Language Group. [309 pp.]
- Hall, Kira, Mary Bucholtz, and Birch Moonwomon, eds. 1992. Locating Power: Proceedings of the Second Berkeley Women and Language Conference, Vol. 1. Berkeley: Berkeley Women & Language Group. [299 pp.]
