= Sociophonetics =

Branch of linguistics combining sociolinguistics and phonetics

Sociophonetics is a branch of linguistics that broadly combines the methods of sociolinguistics and phonetics. It addresses the questions of how socially constructed variation in the sound system is used and learned. The term was first used by Denise Deshaies-Lafontaine in their 1974 dissertation on Quebecois French, with early work in the field focusing on answering questions, chiefly sociolinguistic, using phonetic methods and data. The field began to expand rapidly in the 1990s: interest in the field increased and the boundaries of the field expanded to include a wider diversity of topics. Currently, sociophonetic studies often employ methods and insight from a wide range of fields including psycholinguistics, clinical linguistics, and computational linguistics.

== History ==
At the intersection between phonetics and sociolinguistics, sociophonetics shares its history with both fields starting with Pāṇini's phonetic analysis of Sanskrit circa 600 BCE. Pānini's grammar investigated differences between standard (Vedic) usage and the regional varieties of Sanskrit spoken outside of ritual contexts, with some grammatical rules taking into account sociolinguistic context. After Pānini few phonetic studies were conducted until the 1800s when technological advances especially in audio recording became available. As modern linguistics developed, the types of information investigated tended to be split into an abstract linguistic system and the context in which it is used.

The context of use introduces a wide range of variability due to individual variation such as physiological and anatomical differences, but has also been shown to include social and indexical information about the speaker and context.

The field of sociophonetics, and sociolinguistics generally, began in the 1960s and 70s with the work of William Labov who found statistical correlations between the use of certain pronunciations and membership in social categories. These early investigations tended to focus on variation and change in vowels, and they were conducted almost exclusively in the United States on American English.

== Topics ==
Sociophonetics covers a broad range of topics between the quintessential fields phonetics and sociolinguistics. Studies have focused on differences in speech production, the social meaning of particular pronunciations, perception and perceivability of sociophonetic patterns, and the role of sociocultural factors in phonetic models of production among other topics. Of particular interest to sociophoneticians is the sources and causes of variation in speech, with many studies focusing on differences in pronunciation between regions, social classes, races and ethnicities, genders, sexes, sexual orientations, ages, and within speakers. A common thread between these investigations is the role of biology as an influential but not deterministic force in phonetic variation. For example, young boys will often lower their voices before any pubescent, physical changes occur in their vocal tract in order to distinguish themselves from girls and establish themselves as "masculine".

== Bibliography ==
- Baronowski, Maciej (2013), "Sociophonetics", in Bayley, Robert; Cameron, Richard; Lucas, Ceil (eds.), The Oxford Handbook of Sociolinguistics, Oxford University Press, pp. 403–424, doi:10.1093/oxfordhb/9780199744084.013.0020, ISBN 978-0-19-974408-4
- Caffrey, Cait (2017), "Phonetics", Salem Press Encyclopedia, Salem Press
- Foulkes, Paul; Scobbie, James; Watt, Dominic (2010), "Sociophonetics", in Hardcastle, William; Laver, John; Gibbon, Fiona (eds.), Handbook of Phonetic Sciences (2nd ed.), Wiley-Blackwell
- Hay, Jennifer; Drager, Katie (2007), "Sociophonetics", Annual Review of Anthropology, 36: 89–103, doi:10.1146/annurev.anthro.34.081804.120633
- Holmes, Janet; Wilson, Nick (2017), An Introduction to Sociolinguistics (5th ed.), Routledge
- Kiparsky, Paul (1993), "Pāṇinian linguistics", in Asher, R.E. (ed.), Encyclopedia of Languages and Linguistics, Oxford: Pergamon
