= Robin Lakoff =

American linguist (1942–2025)

- Born: Robin Beth Tolmach; November 27, 1942; New York City, U.S.
- Died: August 5, 2025 (aged 82); Walnut Creek, California, U.S.
- Known for: Language and gender
- Spouse: George Lakoff (m. 1964; div. 1975)
- Children: 1

Academic background
- Education: Radcliffe College; Indiana University Bloomington; Harvard University
- Thesis: Studies in the transformational grammar of Latin: The complement system (1967)

Academic work
- Discipline: Linguistics, Sociolinguistics
- Sub-discipline: Interactional sociolinguistics
- Institutions: University of California, Berkeley, University of Michigan
- Doctoral students: Deborah Tannen, Mary Bucholtz

Robin Beth Tolmach Lakoff (/ˈleɪkɒf/; November 27, 1942 – August 5, 2025) was an American linguist and professor at the University of California, Berkeley. Her 1975 book Language and Woman's Place is often credited with making language and gender a major subfield focus in linguistics and other disciplines.

== Early life and education ==
Lakoff was born Robin Beth Tolmach to a Jewish family in Brooklyn on November 27, 1942. She grew up and went to school in Manhattan.

Lakoff earned a B.A. at Radcliffe College, an M.A. from Indiana University Bloomington, and a Ph.D. in linguistics from Harvard University in 1967, with a dissertation on Latin syntax under a generative grammar framework.

While she was an undergraduate at Radcliffe, in Cambridge, Massachusetts, Lakoff audited Noam Chomsky's classes at the nearby Massachusetts Institute of Technology (MIT), thus developing connections in the MIT Linguistics Department. During this time, as Chomsky and his students were creating Transformational Generative Grammar, Lakoff and others explored ways in which outside context entered the structure of language.

== Career ==
Lakoff taught at the University of California, Berkeley from 1972 until her retirement in 2012.

Lakoff was a regular contributor to the Huffington Post. She received national attention in 2016 for an opinion piece in TIME titled "Hillary Clinton's Emailgate Is an Attack on Women".

== Language and Woman's Place ==
Lakoff's influential work Language and Woman's Place introduces to the field of sociolinguistics many ideas about women's language that are now often commonplace. It has inspired many different strategies for studying language and gender, across national borders as well as across class and race lines.

Her work is noted for its attention to class, power, and social justice in addition to gender.

Lakoff proposed that women's speech can be distinguished from that of men in a number of ways (part of gender deficit model), including:

1. Hedges: Phrases like "sort of", "kind of", "it seems like"
2. Empty adjectives: "divine", "adorable", "gorgeous"
3. Super-polite forms: "Would you mind..." "...if it's not too much to ask" "Is it okay if...?"
4. Apologize more: "I'm sorry, but I think that..."
5. Speak less frequently
6. Avoid curse language or expletives
7. Tag questions: "You don't mind eating this, do you?".
8. Hyper-correct grammar and pronunciation: Use of prestige grammar and clear articulation
9. Indirect requests: "Wow, I'm so thirsty." – really asking for a drink
10. Speak in italics: Use tone to emphasise certain words, e.g., "so", "very", "quite"

Lakoff developed the "Politeness Principle," in which she devised three maxims that are usually followed in interaction. These are: Don't impose, give the receiver options, and make the receiver feel good. She stated that these are paramount in good interaction.

== The Language War ==
Lakoff's The Language War (2000) performs a linguistic analysis of discourse on contemporary issues. She covers topics including the Hill–Thomas hearings, the O. J. Simpson trial, the Lewinsky scandal, and the political correctness phenomenon. Lakoff discusses each topic while arguing a general thesis that language itself constitutes a political battleground.

In The Language War, Lakoff introduced the idea that frames create meanings. She stated that language (either verbal or nonverbal) and experiences are a "body of knowledge that is evoked in order to provide an inferential base for the understanding of an utterance".

Frames are ideas that shape expectations and create focuses that are to be seen as truth and common sense. When someone decides to adopt a frame, that person will believe everything within the frame is genuine, and that what she or he learns within the frame becomes what she or he believes is common sense. For example, in the 19th century, people believed women should wear corsets and bind their waists. No one thought about women wearing clothes without a corset underneath because it was common sense that corsets are a must-have fashion item.

However, if someone decides to look at the same situation outside of the frame (which rarely happens, because people are often convinced that common sense does not require justification), they will have a different understanding of what is in the frame. Continuing with the corset example, in our present time it is common sense that corsets are unhealthy and will do more harm than good to a female body. Hence, the majority of women don't wear corsets. When we look back at the old frame from the 19th century, we think that the fashion sense of that time is strange; this is the outcome of shifted frames.

== Personal life ==
Lakoff was married to fellow linguist George Lakoff from 1964 until they divorced in 1975. The couple had one son.

Robin Lakoff died at a hospital in Walnut Creek, California, from respiratory failure following a fall, on August 5, 2025. She was 82.

== Selected works ==
- 1972: "Language in Context." Language 48:4 (December 1972): pages 907–27.
- 1973: The logic of politeness; or, minding your P's and Q's. In: Papers from the Ninth Regional Meeting of the Chicago Linguistics Society, ed. C. Corum, T. Cedric Smith-Stark, A. Weiser, pages 292–305. Chicago: Department of Linguistics, University of Chicago
- 1975: Language and Woman's Place. ISBN 0-19-516757-0
- 1977: What you can do with words: Politeness, pragmatics and performatives. In: Proceedings of the Texas Conference on Performatives, Presuppositions and Implicatures, ed. R. Rogers, R. Wall & J. Murphy, pages 79–106. Arlington, Va.: Center for Applied Linguistics.
- 1985: When talk is not cheap. With Mandy Aftel. Warner ISBN 0-446-30070-5
- 1990: Talking Power. Basic Books. ISBN 0-465-08358-7
- 1993: Father knows best: the use and abuse of therapy in Freud's case of Dora. With J. Coyne. Teachers College Press. ISBN 0-8077-6266-0
- 2000: The Language War. University of California Press. ISBN 0-520-22296-2
- 2006: "Identity à la carte: you are what you eat." In: Discourse and Identity, ed. Anna DeFina, Deborah Schiffrin and Michael Bamberg. Cambridge University Press: Cambridge.
