= Gender and Language =

- Discipline: Language and linguistics, language and gender, gender and sexuality studies, women's studies
- Language: English
- Edited by: Farhana Abdul Fatah; Sandhya K. Narayanan; Lexi Webster

Publication details
- History: 2007–present
- Publisher: University of Toronto Press on behalf of the International Gender and Language Association
- Frequency: 3 issues per year

Standard abbreviations
- ISO 4: Gend. Lang.

Indexing
- ISSN: 1747-6321 (print); 1747-633X (web)
- OCLC no.: 232359582

Links
- Journal homepage; Online archive

Gender and Language is an international peer-reviewed academic journal for language-based research on gender and sexuality from feminist, queer, trans and nonbinary perspectives. It is the official journal of the International Gender and Language Association and published by University of Toronto Press.

== Abstracting and indexing ==
The journal is abstracted and indexed in several databases, including:

- Social Sciences Citation Index
- Arts and Humanities Citation Index
- Current Contents/Social and Behavioural Sciences
- Current Contents/Arts & Humanities
- Scopus
- MLA Bibliography
- SocINDEX
- Linguistics and Language Behaviour Abstracts

According to Scopus, the journal has a 2024 CiteScore of 3.4.

== See also ==
- List of women's studies journals
- List of Linguistics journals
