= International Gender and Language Association =

International Gender and Language Group (IGALA)
- Formation: 1999
- Purpose: An international interdisciplinary academic group that promotes research on language, gender, and sexuality
- Website: igalaweb.wixsite.com/igala

The International Gender and Language Association (IGALA), is an international interdisciplinary academic organisation that promotes and supports research on language, gender, and sexuality.

== History ==
The association was formed in 1999, having developed out of the graduate-student-run 'Women and Language' group at the University of California, Berkeley. IGALA holds a biannual conference. The society's official academic journal is Gender and Language, launched in 2007 by Equinox Press and now published by University of Toronto Press. IGALA also publishes volumes of selected proceedings. Together these projects have helped shepherd in the expansion of language, gender and sexuality studies into a wider set of topics from a wider range of regions than before, expanding beyond the earlier focus on English speakers that dominated work of earlier decades.

== Previous conferences ==
- IGALA 1 – Stanford University, Stanford, California, May 5–7, 2000
- IGALA 2 – Lancaster University, Lancaster, England, United Kingdom, April 12–14, 2002
- IGALA 3 – Cornell University, Ithaca, New York, United States, June 5–7, 2004
- IGALA 4 – University of Valencia, Valencia, Spain, November 8–10, 2006
- IGALA 5 – Victoria University of Wellington, Wellington, New Zealand, July 3–5, 2008
- IGALA 6 – Tsuda College, Tokyo, Japan, September 18–20, 2010
- IGALA 7 – Universidade do Vale do Rio dos Sinos, São Leopoldo, Brazil, June 20–22, 2012
- IGALA 8 – Simon Fraser University, Vancouver, Canada, June 5–7, 2014
- IGALA 9 – City University of Hong Kong, May 19–21, 2016
- IGALA 10 – University of Botswana, 20–22 June 2018
- IGALA 11 – Queen Mary University of London, 22–24 June 2021
- IGALA 12 – University of Queensland, 4-6 July 2023
- IGALA 13 – Universidad de la República de Uruguay, 23-25 July 2025
