= Raciolinguistics =

The study of race and its relation to language

Raciolinguistics examines how language is used to construct race and how ideas of race influence language and language use. Although sociolinguists and linguistic anthropologists have previously studied the intersections of language, race, and culture, raciolinguistics is a relatively new focus for scholars trying to theorize race throughout language studies. Geneva Smitherman credits H. Samy Alim for the coinage of the new term, discussed at length in the 2016 book by Alim, John R. Rickford and Arnetha F. Ball which compiled raciolinguistic research. In their work, raciolinguists incorporate intersectionality in theorizing how various identities (e.g. gender, ethnicity, nationality) within a group and/or an individual influence lived experiences of race. Nelson Flores and Jonathan Rosa also used the term in their discussion of "appropriateness" in American language and education.

Drawing from sociolinguistics and linguistic anthropology, raciolinguistics focuses on race and its relation to language. A central concern of raciolinguistics is to understand the complex meanings and implications of speech coming from a racialized subject. The field also explores how the relationship between race and language impacts domains like politics and education.

== In education ==
=== Appropriateness ===
In their critique of American language education, Nelson Flores and Jonathan Rosa argued that the standardization of "appropriate" language in American schooling creates different experiences for racialized students. "Appropriate" language, defined by the language of the dominant culture, is a construction of raciolinguistic ideologies that uphold certain linguistic practices as normative and others as deficient. These ideologies are defined by the white listening or speaking subject in that "language-minoritized students [are expected] to mimic the white speaking subject while ignoring the raciolinguistic ideologies that the white listening subject uses to position them as racial Others".

Anthropologist Samy Alim explains in his book that American society is hyperracial or hyperracializing, meaning that when speaking, people are orienting to race while also denying the evidence that shows how society is essentially structured and influenced by it.

== Race and language ==
=== Languaging race ===
Languaging race focuses on how race can be constructed or deconstructed "through the lens of language". Through and by language, one can take on, discard, or impose affiliations made with a certain race; such as education level, economic status, etc. For example, standardized language is linked with the idea of whiteness; this can be observed when black public figures such as Barack Obama are labeled as "articulate" because of their ability to speak standard English, while white public figures' use of standard language is not deemed worthy of comment. Similarly, racialized individuals may be expected to speak languages other than English—for example, Latines expected to be fluent in Spanish—and judged harshly for not being bilingual. In some cases, people may be labeled as unable to speak any language well at all: "Her English is horrible, and from what I hear, her Spanish isn't that good either."

In the context of Native English speaking, languaging race relates to the connection of native English speaking to whiteness, which is rooted in colonization. More specifically, perpetuated colonial distinctions between European and non-European reinforce distinctions between whiteness and nonwhiteness, reproducing perceptions of race and language. Accordingly, people of racialized groups may be perceived as not being able to speak a language despite their fluency. For instance, the employment experience of African immigrants suggests that the evaluation of their accents when speaking English is rooted in the racist association of Black bodies with unintelligible speech.

Languaging race also encompasses the theory of transracialization, made popular in the United States by the case of Rachel Dolezal. However, within raciolinguistics, the emphasis of transracialization is put on how individuals both resist racial categorization and use such categorization in order to achieve racial justice, as in the case of Black Lives Matter.

=== Racing language ===
Racing language uses race theory to understand how sociolinguistic variation relates to social and political processes. This includes the development of African-American Vernacular English (AAVE) in the United States, the generational linguistic shifts of Punjabi communities in London, and the significance of pharyngeal versus depharyngealized Hebrew in Israel. Association with a racial group may be related to the use of ethnolects or ethnolinguistic repertoires, influencing the language used among a racial group and/or an individual seeking to identify with the group. This area explores the historic and systematic reasons linguistic features are associated with certain racial groups.

== Scholars of note ==
The following are some well-known scholars of raciolinguistics: William Labov, Geneva Smitherman, John Baugh, Arthur K. Spears, Donald Winford, John R. Rickford, Angela Rickford, Marcyliena Morgan, Salikoko Mufwene, Sinfree Makoni, Jane Hill, Elinor Ochs, Ana Celia Zentella, Ofelia García, Bernard Perley, Bonnie Urciuoli, Barbra Meek, Mary Bucholtz, H. Samy Alim, Awad Ibrahim, Anne Charity Hudley, Kira Hall, Cecilia Cutler, Michel Degraff, Michele Koven, Angela Reyes, Jonathan Rosa, Nelson Flores, Elaine Chun, Adrienne Lo, Jenny L. Davis, Hilary Dick, Kristina Wirtz, April Baker-Bell, Steve Black, Jennifer Roth-Gordon, Wesley Leonard, Jennifer Delfino, Krystal Smalls, Karl Swinehart, Adrienne Washington, Mariam Durrani, Suzie Telep, Kendra Calhoun, Joyhanna Yoo.

== See also ==
- Decreolization
- Language ideology
- Linguistic profiling
- Linguistic rights
- Race
- Racism
- Sociolinguistics
