= Anthropological linguistics =

Study of language within historical and social contexts

Anthropological linguistics is the subfield of linguistics and anthropology which deals with the place of language in its wider social and cultural context, and its role in making and maintaining cultural practices and societal structures. While many linguists believe that a true field of anthropological linguistics is nonexistent and prefer the term "linguistic anthropology" to cover this subfield, many others regard the two as interchangeable.

== History ==
Although researchers studied the two fields together at various points in the nineteenth century, the intersection of anthropology and linguistics significantly grew in prominence during the early twentieth century. As American scholarship became increasingly interested in the diversity of Native American societies in the New World, anthropologists and linguists worked in conjunction to analyze Native American languages and to study how language related to the origins, distribution, and characteristics of these indigenous populations.

The interdisciplinary approach distinguished American anthropology from its European counterpart; while European anthropology largely focused on ethnography, American anthropology began to integrate linguistics and other disciplines. Anthropological linguistics initially focused largely on unwritten language, but now examines languages both with and without written traditions.

Early anthropological linguists primarily focused on three major areas: linguistic description, classification, and methodology.

- Linguistic Description: Scholars such as Franz Boas, Edward Sapir, Leonard Bloomfield, and Mary Haas drafted descriptions of linguistic structure and the linguistic characteristics of different languages. They conducted research as fieldwork, using recordings of texts from native speakers and performing analysis to categorize the texts by linguistic form and genre.
- Classification: Classification involved outlining the genetic relationships among languages. Linguistic classifications allowed anthropological linguists to organize large amounts of information about specific populations. By classifying language, scholars could systematize and order data from their ethnographic work.
- Methodology: By analytically breaking down language, anthropological linguistics could use the constituent parts to derive social and cultural information. It also made pattern-identification possible, with Boas and Sapir using these procedures to show that linguistic patterning was unrealized among speakers of a given language.

== Overview ==
Anthropological linguistics is one of many disciplines that studies the role of languages in the social lives of individuals and within communities. To do so, experts have had to understand not only the logic behind linguistic systems such as their grammars but also record the activities in which those systems are used. In the 1960s and the 1970s, sociolinguistics and anthropological linguistics were often viewed as one single field of study, but they have since become more separate as more academic distance has been put between them. Though there are many similarities and a definite sharing of topics such as gender and language, they are two related but separate entities. Anthropological linguistics came about in the United States as a subfield of anthropology, when anthropologists were beginning to study the indigenous cultures, and the indigenous languages could no longer be ignored, and quickly morphed into the subfield of linguistics that it is known as today.

Anthropological linguistics has had a major impact in the studies of such areas as visual perception (especially colour) and bioregional democracy, both of which are concerned with distinctions that are made in languages about perceptions of the surroundings.

Conventional linguistic anthropology also has implications for sociology and self-organization of peoples. Study of the Penan people, for instance, reveals that their language employs six different and distinct words whose best English translation is "we". Anthropological linguistics studies those distinctions and relates them to types of societies and to actual bodily adaptation to the senses, much as it studies distinctions made in languages regarding the colours of the rainbow: seeing the tendency to increase the diversity of terms, as evidence that there are distinctions that bodies in this environment must make, which leads to situated knowledge and perhaps a situated ethics, whose final evidence is the differentiated set of terms used to denote "we".

The two branches of anthropological linguistics are nomenclatural/classificational and ethnographic/sociolinguistics.

Indexicality refers to language forms that is tied to meaning through association of specific and general, as opposed to direct naming. For example, an anthropological linguist may utilize indexicality to analyze what an individual's use of language reveals about his or her social class. Indexicality is inherent in form-function relationships.

== Distinction from other subfields ==
Although the terms "anthropological linguistics" and "linguistic anthropology" are often viewed as being synonymous, specialists often make a distinction. While anthropological linguistics is considered a subfield of linguistics, linguistic anthropology is generally considered to be a subfield of anthropology. Anthropological linguistics also uses more distinctly linguistic methodology, and studies languages as "linguistic phenomena." Ultimately, anthropological linguistics focuses on the cultural and social meaning of language, with more of an emphasis on linguistic structure. Conversely, linguistic anthropology uses more anthropological methods (such as participant observation and fieldwork) to analyze language through a cultural framework and determine the rules of its social use.

While anthropological linguistics uses language to determine cultural understandings, sociolinguistics views language itself as a social institution. Anthropological linguistics is largely interpretative, striving to determine the significance behind the use of language through its forms, registers, and styles. Sociolinguistics instead examines how language relates to various social groups and identities like race, gender, class, and age.

== Structures ==
=== Phonology ===
A common variation of linguistics that focuses on the sounds within speech of any given language. It outlines why phonetic features identify words.

Phonology puts a large focus on the systematic structure of the sounds being observed.

=== Morphology ===
Morphology, in linguistics, commonly looks at the structure of words within a language to develop a better understanding for the word form being used. It is the branch of linguistics that deals with words, their internal structure, and their formation. Morphology looks broadly at the connection of word forms within a specific language in relation to the culture or environment it is rooted within.

=== Methodology ===
There are two major trends in the theoretical and methodological study of attitudes in the social sciences: mentalist and behaviorist. The mentalist trend treats attitude as a mediating concept while the behaviorist trend operationally defines it as a probability concept, though in research practice both derive their attitude measures from response variation. While there are many different views concerning the structure and components of attitudes, there is, however, an overwhelming agreement that attitudes are learned, lasting, and positively related to behavior. Methodology in attitude studies includes direct and indirect measures of all kinds, but language attitude studies have tended to make more use of questionnaires than of other methods. The matched guise technique, a sociolinguistic experimental technique that is used to determine the true feelings of an individual or community towards a specific language, dialect, or accent, has been extensively used for studies relating to the social significance of languages and language varieties. A special adaptation of this technique, called mirror image, appears promising for measuring consensual evaluations of language switching at the situational level.

Situational based self-report instruments such as those used by Greenfield and Fishman also promise to be very effective instruments for studies pertaining to normative views concerning the situational use of languages and language varieties. The commitment measure has been found to be particularly suited for collecting data on behavioral tendencies. Data obtained through interviewing may be difficult to process and score – and may provide bias from those being interviewed – but the research interview can be particularly effective for attitude assessment, especially when used to complement the observational method. Data collected through the observational method can be formally processed like data obtained through more formalized instruments if attempts are made to record the data in more public forms instead of only through the approach most characteristic for this kind of data have used so far.

Many linguists believe that comparisons of linguistic and social behavior have been blocked by the fact that linguistic and anthropological studies are rarely based on comparable sets of data. While an anthropologist's description refers to specific communities, linguistic analysis refers to a single language or dialect, and the behaviors formed through verbal signs and structural similarities. The process of linguistic analysis is oriented towards the discovery of unitary, structurally similar wholes. The effect of these procedures is the selection of one single variety out of the many varieties that characterize everyday speech and behavior. English is often thought of as one single language, as though people forget the many dialects and accents that come with it. English spoken in the United States will not be the same English spoken in Australia, or in the countries of Africa. Even American English spoken in New York State will not be exactly the same as American English spoken in Alabama.

== Code-switching ==
While code-switching, a situation in which a speaker alternates between two or more languages, or language varieties, in the context of a single conversation, is not the only form of linguistic variability to carry a social, or referential meaning, it provides a particularly clear approach to understanding the relationship between social processes and linguistic forms, because both the social and the linguistic boundaries in question tend to be most evident than in other monolingual settings. In anthropological linguistics, code-switching has been approached as a structurally unified phenomenon whose significance comes from a universal pattern of relationships between form, function, and context.

Many linguists are approaching code-switching as a form of verbal strategy that represents the ways in which the linguistic resources available to individuals may vary according to the nature of their social boundaries within their communities. While the emphasis is on language use in social interaction as the preferred focus for examining exactly how those processes work, it is clear that future research must take into account the situation of that interaction within the specific community, or across communities. The study of code-switching will increasingly be able to contribute to an understanding of the nature of speech communities.

== Related fields ==
Anthropological linguistics is concerned with the following:

- Descriptive (or synchronic) linguistics: Describing dialects (forms of a language used by a specific speech community). This study includes phonology, morphology, syntax, semantics, and grammar.
- Historical (or diachronic) linguistics: Describing changes in dialects and languages over time. This study includes the study of linguistic divergence and language families, comparative linguistics, etymology, and philology.
- Ethnolinguistics: Analyzing the relationship between culture, thought, and language.
- Sociolinguistics: Analyzing the social functions of language and the social, political, and economic relationships among and between members of speech communities.

== See also ==
- Linguistic relativity
- Linguistic anthropology
- Gender role in language
- Sociolinguistics
- Sociology of language
- World Oral Literature Project
- Semiotic anthropology
