= Bambi Schieffelin =

American linguist

Bambi B. Schieffelin (born April 26, 1945) is a linguistic anthropologist and professor emerita at New York University (NYU) in the department of Anthropology. Along with Elinor Ochs, she pioneered the field of language socialization. In addition, she has written extensively about language contact, language ideology, literacy, Haitian Creole, and missionization.

== Career ==
Schieffelin began undergraduate studies at Bennington College but transferred to Columbia University, where she received a Bachelor of Science in Anthropology & Comparative Literature in 1967. She received a Master's degree in Developmental Psychology from Columbia University in 1977. Her PhD in Anthropology (also from Columbia University) in 1979 was based on ethnographic fieldwork in Papua New Guinea, with a dissertation entitled, "How Kaluli Children Learn What to Say, What to Do, and How to Feel: An Ethnographic Study of the Development of Communicative Competence." Between 1979-80, she was a postdoctoral researcher in Developmental Psychology at the University of California, Berkeley.

Schieffelin began her academic career as a Visiting Assistant Professor of Linguistics at Stanford University in 1980, before joining the University of Pennsylvania as an assistant professor in education, culture and society. She held a faculty position in the University of Pennsylvania Graduate School of Education until 1986, when she was denied tenure within the context of an alleged culture of sexism and personal vendettas influencing decisions at the school. Several other faculty members (including William Labov, Lila R. Gleitman, Fred L. Block, and Frank Furstenberg) severed ties with the School of Education to protest her tenure denial, citing her "international reputation" and "work... of the highest quality".

After leaving the University of Pennsylvania, she joined New York University's Department of Anthropology as an assistant professor, was promoted to associate professor in 1989, and attained the rank of full professor in 1995, a position she held until her retirement in 2020. She was appointed to a Collegiate Professorship at NYU in 2007, one of the university's highest faculty distinctions. During her time at NYU she also served as co-organizer of both the NYU Working Group in Urban Sociolinguistics (1994–2016) and the New York Linguistic Anthropology Working Group (2008–2015).

She held visiting professorships at Stockholm University's Center for Research on Bilingualism (1993), the University of Vienna's Institute for Social and Cultural Anthropology (2000, 2007, 2009), L'École des Hautes Études en Sciences Sociales in Paris (2008), and the Museu Nacional in Rio de Janeiro (2010). She also served as faculty at the Linguistic Society of America Summer Institute at Georgetown University (1985) and at the CUNY Graduate Center (1986).

== Research and Theory ==
=== Language Socialization ===
Schieffelin is best known for co-founding the field of language socialization alongside Elinor Ochs, whom she first met at an anthropology panel organized by Sue Ervin-Tripp in 1974. The two scholars formed a long-running collaboration rooted in a shared dissatisfaction with the state of both developmental psycholinguistics and cultural anthropology at the time: the former largely ignored culture, while the latter largely ignored language. Drawing also on the influence of ethnomethodology — which demonstrated that talk could be studied in fine-grained, turn-by-turn detail — they developed language socialization as an integrative framework for understanding how individuals simultaneously acquire language and become competent members of their cultures. A defining feature of the framework, which Schieffelin has emphasized throughout her career, is its insistence on longitudinal, ethnographic research: a language socialization study must track change over time, not capture a single moment of interaction.

Their foundational 1984 chapter "Language Acquisition and Socialization: Three Developmental Stories and Their Implications," co-authored with Ochs, laid out the theoretical basis for the field by contrasting child-rearing and language-learning practices across three communities. Their 1986 edited volume Language Socialization Across Cultures and the 2012 Handbook of Language Socialization, co-edited with Ochs and Alessandro Duranti, remain central reference works in the field.

=== Fieldwork with the Kaluli People ===
Schieffelin's empirical work has centered on the Kaluli people of the Bosavi region on the Great Papuan Plateau in southwestern Papua New Guinea, a remote rainforest area with no roads or electricity, accessible only on foot. She first visited Bosavi in 1967–1969, before beginning graduate school, and returned for dissertation fieldwork from 1975 to 1977, staying for twenty months. Working with four Kaluli families, she conducted daily audio-recorded observations of young children just beginning to speak, rotating between households and following families to gardens, rivers, and other community activities. The Kaluli community spoke no Tok Pisin or English at the time of her initial visits, requiring full language immersion. To begin learning Kaluli, she undertook an ethnobotany project in which community members brought her plant specimens in exchange for trade goods, providing a structured entry point into the language.

Her fieldwork produced her 1990 ethnography The Give and Take of Everyday Life: Language Socialization of Kaluli Children, which documented how Kaluli caregivers actively shaped children's verbal behavior through explicit instruction and modeled speech. One theoretical insight that emerged from this work and that Schieffelin has described as particularly formative concerned the Kaluli understanding of mental states: Kaluli people expressed that one cannot know what another person thinks or feels, a stance that challenged foundational assumptions in both anthropology and psychology about intersubjectivity and the so-called "theory of mind." This observation redirected her thinking about evidentiality and about the cultural specificity of how communities talk about — or deliberately refrain from talking about — the inner lives of others.

She returned to Papua New Guinea for further research in 1984–1985, 1990, 1994–1995, and 1998, conducting projects on the ethnography of speaking in Bosavi, language change, and the influence of Christian missionization on Kaluli literacy and language ideology. In collaboration with ethnomusicologist Steven Feld, she compiled the Bosavi-English-Tok-Pisin Dictionary, published in 1998 by the Australian National University's Pacific Linguistics series.

=== Language and Digital Mediation ===
Beginning in the mid-2000s, Schieffelin conducted fieldwork on computer-mediated communication in New York City, an interest that led to a sustained collaboration with linguistic anthropologist Graham M. Jones. They have researched youth language use in instant messaging and text messaging, particularly the use of the word like. Together they examined how young people adapt spoken language conventions to digital writing, including a 2009 study of the quotative construction "be + like" in instant messaging, analyzing how it functions as a way of voicing and attributing speech to others. Their collaboration also extended to the cultural dimensions of online sociality more broadly, including a 2011 study of online gossip as a form of metacommunication, and a 2015 essay on the ethnography of inscriptive speech in digital environments.

Schieffelin has also published on the linguistic aspects of evidentiality, focusing on how children learn culturally appropriate ways of referencing sources of knowledge — a thread connecting her digital media work back to her long-standing fieldwork with the Kaluli, among whom the question of how speakers signal the basis for what they know or claim is especially culturally elaborated.

== Contributions to the field ==
Schieffelin has played a substantial role in shaping the infrastructure of modern anthropology, particularly linguistic anthropology, through editorial leadership. She co-founded and co-edited the journal Papers in Pragmatics for the International Pragmatics Association from 1986 to 1990, and served as co-editor of the association's journal Pragmatics from 1990 to 1992. She served as associate editor of the Annual Review of Anthropology from 1992 to 2001, returning to its editorial board from 2017 to 2022. From 1998 to 2007 she was a series editor for the Social and Cultural Foundations of Language series at Cambridge University Press. She has also served on the editorial boards of the Journal of Linguistic Anthropology, American Anthropologist, Ethnos, Discourse Studies, Discourse Processes, and Text, among others.

In terms of professional service, she served on the advisory council of the Wenner-Gren Foundation for Anthropological Research from 1999 to 2003, including a term as chair from 2002 to 2003, and served on the executive committee of the Society for Linguistic Anthropology from 2002 to 2006. She has served on selection committees for the Spencer Foundation, Ford Foundation, National Science Foundation, American Council of Learned Societies, and European Science Foundation, and has been a member of the Lévi-Strauss Lecture selection committee at EHESS in Paris.

== Awards and Recognition ==
Schieffelin has received numerous fellowships and awards over the course of her career. Early support came from the National Science Foundation and the Wenner-Gren Foundation for Anthropological Research, both of which funded her dissertation research (1975–1977). She held a National Institutes of Health Postdoctoral Fellowship at UC Berkeley (1979–1980) and was a Visiting Scholar at the Research School of Pacific Studies at the Australian National University in 1981. Later grants from the Spencer Foundation (1988–1990), the National Endowment for the Humanities (1994; 1998–1999), the American Council of Learned Societies (1998–1999), and the John Simon Guggenheim Memorial Foundation (1998–1999) supported her research on language ideology and Kaluli literacy. She received NYU's Golden Dozen Teaching Award in 2010 and its Distinguished Teaching Award in 2012. She was a Phi Beta Kappa Visiting Scholar in 2014–2015 and was elected a Fellow of the American Academy of Arts and Sciences in 2022.

== Selected works ==
- Miki Makihara & Bambi Schieffelin, eds. 2007. Consequences of Contact: Language Ideologies and Sociocultural Transformations in Pacific Societies.OUP. ISBN 9780195324983
- Bambi B. Schieffelin, Kathryn A. Woolard, and Paul V. Kroskrity, eds. 1998. Language Ideologies. OUP. ISBN 9780195105629
- Bambi B. Schieffelin. 2005. The Give and Take of Everyday Life. Cambridge University Press. ISBN 9780521386548
