= Kathryn Woolard =

American linguistic anthropologist

Kathryn Woolard Kathryn Woolard
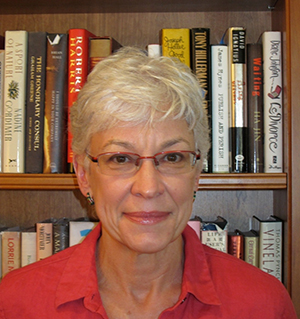
- Born: Kathryn Ann Woolard; 1950 (age 75–76); Wellsville, New York, U.S.
- Occupation: Professor of Anthropology at the University of California, San Diego

Academic background
- Education: B.A. University of Michigan, Ann Arbor, 1974 in English M.A. University of California, Berkeley, 1978 in Anthropology Ph.D. University of California, Berkeley, 1983 in Anthropology

Academic work
- Main interests: sociolinguistics, Catalan language

Kathryn Ann Woolard (born in Wellsville, New York, 1950) is a professor of Anthropology at the University of California, San Diego. She specializes in linguistic anthropology and received a Ph.D. in anthropology from the University of California at Berkeley.

Woolard served as the president of the Society for Linguistic Anthropology, a section of the American Anthropological Association, from 2009 to 2011.

== Research and publications ==
=== Research interests ===
Woolard is interested in linguistic anthropology, language and ethnicity, bilingualism, language ideology, and political discourse in Catalonia, Spain, and the United States.

=== Research overview ===
Woolard studies social relations and language use from an anthropological perspective, viewing language as a tool for communication, a means of social action, and a way of understanding the world. From this point of view, Woolard's analyses can be framed within current critical sociolinguistics, as her work integrates sociolinguistic theory and social theory. Within this perspective, the ideas that individuals and groups have about language and linguistic practices are understood as expressions of different views of society and social organization. Other scholars associated with critical sociolinguistics include Pierre Bourdieu and Mikhail Bakhtin.

Based on ethnographic investigation, Woolard analyzes the place of authority and authenticity in people's understanding of language and social order, particularly as these concepts are understood in Catalonia related to changes in the national language project and the status of Catalan and Castilian in contemporary Catalonia after thirty years of political autonomy within Spain. In relation to the media coverage of Catalonia, Woolard explains how there is a tendency for coverage to point to Catalonia's distinct language and culture, to demonstrate backwardness in the country. Woolard's research looks at how the media does not capture the linguistic dynamics of Catalan identity or the sovereignty movement adequately, which she addresses in her book, Singular and Plural: Ideologies of Linguistic Authority in 21st Century Catalonia which was written in 2016.

=== Singular and Plural: Ideologies of Linguistic Authority in 21st Century Catalonia ===
In Singular and Plural: Ideologies of Linguistic Authority in Twenty-First Century Catalonia, Woolard analyzes linguistic authority and then applies this analysis to Catalonia's political situation. Through a range of case studies, Woolard demonstrates the changes in Catalan linguistic practices, identities, and ideology. With Catalonia's autonomy within Spain, identities linked to Catalonia and the Catalan language have been questioned and shifted in the last decades. Woolard calls for linguistic anthropologists to recognize the polarization of language ideology, nationalism, and cosmopolitanism in relation to Catalonian politics. Woolard provides a framework to be used on the analysis of linguistic authorities and applies it to the politics of language in Catalonia. She then analyzes how this general framework could be used in analyzing language ideologies in other contexts. Woolard investigates the intersections between language and politics by building on her research relating to how language acquires authority in the public eye. She demonstrates that ideologies of authenticity and anonymity pare underpinned by sociolinguistic naturalism. She argues that Catalan speakers are shifting towards innovative linguistic practices that differ from the naturalistic ideologies. Woolard also looks at the coverage from the United States on Catalonia and the media's 'imbalanced' portrayal. Woolard then looks at how the media's coverage of language and politics is limited by what she calls "mainstream and unionist Spanish media." Woolard's book won the Society for Linguistic Anthropology Edward Sapir Book Prize in 2017.

=== Selected publications ===
- 1989. Double Talk: Bilingualism and the Politics of Ethnicity in Catalonia. Stanford: Stanford University Press.
- 1992. Identitat i contacte de llengües a Barcelona. Barcelona: Edicions de la Magrana.
- Bambi Schieffelin, Kathryn Woolard and Paul Kroskrity (eds). 1998. Language Ideologies: Practice and Theory New York: Oxford University Press.
- Susan Gal and Kathryn Woolard. 2001. Languages and Publics: The Making of Authority. Manchester: St. Jerome Publishing.
- 2016. Singular and Plural: Ideologies of Linguistic Authority in 21st Century Catalonia. Oxford: Oxford University Press.
