= Miyako Inoue =

Miyako Inoue may refer to:

- Miyako Inoue (linguistic anthropologist) (born 1962), professor at Stanford University
- Yolei Inoue (Inoue Miyako), a character in Digimon Adventure 02
