= Metapragmatics =

Study in linguistics

In linguistics, metapragmatics is the study of how the effects and conditions of language use themselves become objects of discourse. The term is commonly associated with the semiotically-informed linguistic anthropology of Michael Silverstein.

== Overview ==
Metapragmatic signalling allows participants to construe what is going on in an interaction. Examples include:

- Describing the "correct way" of using language ("I before E except after C."),
- Specifying under which conditions a specific kind of communication are, or should be, used ("You should never tell a dirty joke at a funeral."),
- Signalling, explicitly or implicitly, the type of social event occurring (explicit: "I promise to be there at 3:00 p.m." implicit: "I will be there at 3:00 p.m.")
- Linking speech to another event outside the moment of speaking ("Every day she goes jogging." ).

Discussions of linguistic pragmatics—that is, discussions of what speech does in a particular context—are meta-pragmatic, because they describe the meaning of speech as action. Although it is useful to distinguish semantic (i.e. denotative or referential) meaning (dictionary meaning) from pragmatic meaning, and thus metasemantic discourse (for example, "Mesa means 'table' in Spanish") from metapragmatic utterances (e.g. "Say 'thank you' to your grandmother," or "It is impolite to swear in mixed company"), meta-semantic characterizations of speech are a type of metapragmatic speech. This follows from the assertion that metapragmatic speech characterizes speech function, and denotation or reference are among the many functions of speech. Because metapragmatics describes relations between different discourses it relates crucially to the concepts of intertextuality or interdiscursivity.

In anthropology, describing the rules of use for metapragmatic speech (in the same way that a grammar would describe the rules of use for 'ordinary' or semantic speech) is important because it can aid the understanding and analysis of a culture's language ideology. Silverstein has also described universal limits on metapragmatic awareness that help explain why some linguistic forms seem to be available to their users for conscious comment, while other forms seem to escape awareness despite efforts by a researcher to ask native speakers to repeat them or characterize their use.

Self-referential, or reflexive, metapragmatic statements are indexical. That is, their meaning comes from their temporal contiguity with their referent: themselves. Example: "This is an example sentence."

The anthropologist Aomar Boum uses a related concept of "ethnometapragmatics" to explain the Moroccan concept of showing the "plastic eye" ('ayn mika), which refers to the practice of ignoring something while pretending it is not there.

== See also ==
- Metasemantics
- Metasyntax
