= Susan Gal =

American anthropologist

- Born: 1949 (age 76–77)
- Education: Barnard College (B.A.); University of California, Berkeley (Ph.D.)
- Occupations: Anthropologist; linguist; professor

Susan Gal (born 1949) is the Mae & Sidney G. Metzl Distinguished Service Professor of Anthropology, of Linguistics, and of Social Sciences at the University of Chicago. She is the author or co-author of several books and numerous articles on linguistic anthropology, gender and politics, and the social history of Eastern Europe.

== Education ==
Gal received her B.A. in psychology and anthropology from Barnard College in 1970 and received her Ph.D. from the University of California, Berkeley in 1976.

== Career and research ==
She taught at Rutgers University from 1977 to 1994, and then moved to the University of Chicago, serving as the Chair of the Department of Anthropology between 1999 and 2002. She received the Quantrell Award for Excellence in Undergraduate Teaching.

Her first book, Language Shift: Social Determinants of Linguistic Change in Bilingual Austria, was published in 1979 and examined the linguistic situation of a Hungarian minority in the town of Burgenland, Austria. As Richard Coates states in his review, the book argues that "language shift is essentially a symbolic change correlated with the changing relative status of the value-systems which each language symbolizes, and not a simple function of industrialization, urbanization or some other large-scale social change." Gal co-wrote the book The Politics of Gender After Socialism (2000) with Gail Kligman, which won the 2001 Heldt Prize (awarded by the American Association for the Advancement of Slavic Studies), and co-edited the anthology Reproducing Gender: Politics, Publics, and Everyday Life after Socialism with Kligman. These books examine the complex relationship between ideas and practices of gender and political economic change, taking the post-Soviet transition across a number of East Central European countries as case studies.

In 2007, Gal was elected to the American Academy of Arts and Sciences.

Gal is a member of the editorial board of American Anthropologist.

== Honors and awards ==
Gal co-authored Signs of Difference: Language and Ideology in Social Life (2019) with Judith T. Irvine. The book received the Edward Sapir Prize from the Society for Linguistic Anthropology in 2021.

Gal received the Simon Guggenheim Memorial Fellowship in 2002 for the study of language ideologies and political authority during and after socialism, and has been awarded the SSRC-ACLS International Fellowship, as well as Fulbright and NIMH Fellowships.

== Selected publications ==
- Gal, Susan (2009). "Language and Political Space". In P. Auer & J.E. Schmidt (ed.). Language and Space. Mouton de Gruyter. pp. 33–50. ISBN 9783110180022.
- Gal, Susan (2006). "Linguistic Anthropology". In K. Brown (ed.). The Encyclopedia of Language and Linguistics. Elsevier. ISBN 978-0-08-044854-1.
- Gal, Susan (2005). "Language ideologies compared: Metaphors and circulations of public and private". Journal of Linguistic Anthropology. 15 (1): 23–37. doi:10.1525/jlin.2005.15.1.23.
- Gal, Susan (2002). "A Semiotics of the Public/Private Distinction". Differences: A Journal of Feminist Cultural Studies. 13 (1): 77–95. doi:10.1215/10407391-13-1-77. S2CID 144808547.
- Gal, Susan; Woolard, Kathryn (2001). Languages and Publics: The Making of Authority. Manchester: St. Jerome’s Press. ISBN 1900650436.
- Gal, Susan; Kligman, Gail (2000). The Politics of Gender After Socialism: A Comparative Historical Essay. Princeton University Press. ISBN 9780691048949.
- Gal, Susan; Kligman, Gail (2000). Reproducing Gender: Politics, Publics, and Everyday Life after Socialism. Princeton University Press. ISBN 9780691048680.
- Gal, Susan (1989). "Language and Political Economy". Annual Review of Anthropology. 18: 345–367. doi:10.1146/annurev.an.18.100189.002021.
- Gal, Susan (1979). Language Shift: Social Determinants of Linguistic Change in Bilingual Austria. Academic Press. ISBN 0122737504.
- Gal, Susan (1978). "Peasant men can't get wives: Language change and sex roles in a bilingual community". Language in Society. 7 (1): 1–16. doi:10.1017/s0047404500005303. S2CID 144342959.
