= Jonathan Rosa =

American linguistic anthropologist

Academic background
- Education: University of Chicago

Academic work
- Discipline: education; linguistics; anthropology; comparative literature
- Sub-discipline: raciolinguistics; sociolinguistics; linguistic anthropology
- Institutions: Stanford University; University of Massachusetts Amherst; New York University
- Notable works: Looking like a Language, Sounding like a Race: Raciolinguistic Ideologies and the Learning of Latinidad

Jonathan Rosa is an American sociocultural and linguistic anthropologist known for his contributions to raciolinguistics. His work explores the intersections of race and language, often through ethnographic research in secondary schools. He is an associate professor at the Stanford University Graduate School of Education as well as the Stanford University Center for Comparative Studies in Race and Ethnicity. In 2019, he published the book Looking like a Language, Sounding like a Race: Raciolinguistic Ideologies and the Learning of Latinidad.

== Education ==
Rosa graduated from Swarthmore College in 2003 with a BA in linguistics and educational studies. He attended graduate school at the University of Chicago in the field of sociocultural and linguistic anthropology, receiving an MA in 2006 and a PhD in 2010.

== Career ==
In 2010, Rosa was hired as an assistant professor and faculty fellow at New York University. In 2011, he began working at University of Massachusetts Amherst as an assistant professor of anthropology.

In 2015, Rosa was hired by Stanford University. As of 2026, he is an associate professor of education and, by courtesy, anthropology, linguistics, and comparative literature.

== Research ==
=== Raciolinguistics ===
In 2015, Nelson Flores and Jonathan Rosa introduced the idea of a raciolinguistic perspective, a theoretical framework for understanding how language affects race and vice versa. They also introduced the term raciolinguistic ideology, which refers to a type of language ideology.

=== Looking like a Language, Sounding like a Race ===
In 2019, Rosa published the book Looking like a Language, Sounding like a Race: Raciolinguistic Ideologies and the Learning of Latinidad, which is based on ethnographic research Rosa conducted at a Chicago public school in which most of the students identified as Mexican or Puerto Rican. Rosa explores how these racial identities, in addition to a broader Latino identity, are constructed at the school through the use of language, as well as how that racialization affects the students' lives while navigating American society. He describes how societal perceptions of language skills are shaped by a raciolinguistic ideology called "languagelessness", which devalues bilingualism and assumes that Latinos are linguistically deficient in both Spanish and English. He explains the complex ways in which the students combine Spanish and English in order to express their identities while conforming to these societal pressures.

== Selected works ==
=== Books ===
- Rosa, Jonathan (2019). Looking like a Language, Sounding like a Race: Raciolinguistic Ideologies and the Learning of Latinidad. New York, NY: Oxford University Press. ISBN 978-0-19-063472-8.
- Language and Social Justice in Practice. Netta Avineri, Laura R. Graham, Eric J. Johnson, Robin Conley Riner, Jonathan Rosa (eds.). New York: Routledge. 2018. doi:10.4324/9781315115702. ISBN 978-1-315-11570-2.

=== Articles ===
- Bonilla, Yarimar; Rosa, Jonathan (January 15, 2015). "#Ferguson: Digital protest, hashtag ethnography, and the racial politics of social media in the United States". American Ethnologist. 42 (1). American Ethnological Society: 4–17. doi:10.1111/amet.12112. ISSN 1548-1425.
- Flores, Nelson; Rosa, Jonathan (June 1, 2015). "Undoing Appropriateness: Raciolinguistic Ideologies and Language Diversity in Education". Harvard Educational Review. 85 (2). Harvard Education Publishing Group: 149–171. doi:10.17763/0017-8055.85.2.149. ISSN 0017-8055.
- Rosa, Jonathan Daniel (August 24, 2016). "Standardization, Racialization, Languagelessness: Raciolinguistic Ideologies across Communicative Contexts". Journal of Linguistic Anthropology. 26 (2). Society for Linguistic Anthropology: 162–183. doi:10.1111/jola.12116. ISSN 1548-1395.
- Rosa, Jonathan; Flores, Nelson (September 11, 2017). "Unsettling race and language: Toward a raciolinguistic perspective". Language in Society. 46 (5). Cambridge University Press: 621–647. doi:10.1017/S0047404517000562. ISSN 0047-4045.
- Flores, Nelson; Rosa, Jonathan (January 16, 2019). "Bringing Race Into Second Language Acquisition". The Modern Language Journal. 103 (S1). National Federation of Modern Language Teachers’ Associations: 145–151. doi:10.1111/modl.12523. ISSN 0026-7902.

== Awards ==
- 2018 Charles A. Ferguson Award for Outstanding Scholarship
- 2020 Association of American Publishers PROSE Award for Language and Linguistics, for Looking like a Language, Sounding like a Race
- 2021 American Association for Applied Linguistics First Book Award, for Looking like a Language, Sounding like a Race

== See also ==
- Raciolinguistics
