= Michael Silverstein =

American linguist (1945–2020)

- Silverstein in the early 1980s
- Born: 12 September 1945; New York, New York, U.S.
- Died: 17 July 2020 (aged 74); Chicago, Illinois, U.S.
- Known for: Metapragmatics, language ideology
- Title: Charles F. Grey Distinguished Service Professor

Academic background
- Education: Harvard University (BA, Ph.D.)
- Doctoral advisor: Karl Teeter

Michael Silverstein (12 September 1945 – 17 July 2020) was an American linguist and semiotician who served as the Charles F. Grey Distinguished Service Professor of anthropology, linguistics, and psychology at the University of Chicago. He was a theoretician of semiotics and linguistic anthropology. Over the course of his career he created an original synthesis of research on the semiotics of communication, the sociology of interaction, Russian formalist literary theory, linguistic pragmatics, sociolinguistics, early anthropological linguistics and structuralist grammatical theory, together with his own theoretical contributions, yielding a comprehensive account of the semiotics of human communication and its relation to culture. He presented the developing results of this project annually from 1970 until his death in a course entitled "Language in Culture". Among other achievements, he was instrumental in introducing the semiotic terminology of Charles Sanders Peirce, including especially the notion of indexicality, into the linguistic and anthropological literature; with coining the terms metapragmatics and metasemantics in drawing attention to the central importance of metasemiotic phenomena for any understanding of language or social life; and with introducing language ideology as a field of study. His works are noted for their terminological complexity and technical difficulty.

== Academic work ==
Silverstein earned both his undergraduate and Ph.D. degrees at Harvard University, where he studied with the Russian linguist, semiotician and literary critic Roman Jakobson, a former member of the Prague School, and with logician and philosopher Willard Van Orman Quine. In 1982 he was awarded a MacArthur Fellowship in the second year of the prize's existence, and was the youngest person, at the time, to be awarded the grant. He was also a Junior Fellow of the Harvard Society of Fellows, in Anthropology.

He was a prime influence in defining language ideologies as a field of study. Language ideologies are socially grounded beliefs and conceptualisations of language, its functions and its users. Based on work of Benjamin Lee Whorf and Charles Sanders Peirce, and incorporating insights from structuralism, philology, history and social theory, he saw language ideologies as patterns that guide speakers' use of language and so, eventually, change that language. We talk on the basis of what we believe we can do with and in language, and by doing that we shape our language. Thus, language ideologies form the bridge between language patterns and social and cultural structure, as the socially grounded beliefs in what language is and does convert into particular patterns of use that are understandable, precisely because they fit these beliefs and the expectations they generate. The connections between usage and beliefs are empirically identifiable as metapragmatics – the articulation of beliefs about language use in language use (as when one uses polite formulae in addressing someone in a superior position).

Silverstein's work caused a theoretical and conceptual shift in anthropology, linguistics and sociolinguistics. It led to a renewed interest in the study of linguistic relativity. It also added another perspective of critique of Chomskyan conceptions of language and it has boosted a critical and politically sensitive trend in the study of language in society, influencing notably the study of language policy, language planning, and language in education.

He also studied the indigenous languages of Australia and the Americas, and in 2014 was awarded the Franz Boas award for Exemplary Service to Anthropology by the American Anthropological Association.

== Publications ==
- 1976a. "Hierarchy of features and ergativity." In Grammatical Categories in Australian Languages (R.M.W. Dixon, ed.), 112–171.
- 1976b. "Shifters, linguistic categories and cultural description."
- 1977. "Cultural prerequisites to grammatical analysis." In Linguistics and Anthropology (M. Saville-Troike, ed.), 139-51. Washington, D.C.: Georgetown University Press.
- 1979. "Language structure and linguistic ideology." In The Elements: A Parasession on Linguistic Units and Levels (R. Cline, W. Hanks, and C. Hofbauer, eds.), 193-247. Chicago: Chicago Linguistic Society.
- 1981a. "Case marking and the nature of language." Australian Journal of Linguistics, 227-244.
- 1981b. "The limits of awareness."
- 1985a. "Language and the culture of gender: at the intersection of structure, usage, and ideology." In Semiotic Mediation: Sociocultural and Psychological Perspectives (E. Mertz and R. Parmentier, eds.), 219-259. Orlando: Academic Press.
- 1985b. "The functional stratification of language and ontogenesis."
- 1987a. "The three faces of function: preliminaries to a psychology of language."
- 1987b. "Cognitive implications of a referential hierarchy."
- 1987c. "Monoglot 'Standard' in America: standardization and metaphors of linguistic hegemony."
- 1992. "The indeterminacy of contextualization: when is enough enough?" In The Contextualization of Language (Auer, Peter & Aldo Di Luzio, eds.), 55-76.
- 1992. "Of nominatives and datives: universal grammar from the bottom up."
- 1993. "Metapragmatic discourse and metapragmatic function." In Reflexive Language: Reported Speech and Metapragmatics (J. Lucy, ed.), 33-58.
- 1996. Natural Histories of Discourse (editor, with Greg Urban). Chicago: University of Chicago Press. ISBN 0-8223-3474-7.
  - Includes chapter, "The Secret Life of Texts", 81-105.
- 1997a. "Encountering languages and languages of encounter in North American ethnohistory."
- 1997b. "The Improvisational Performance of Culture in Realtime Discursive Practice". In Creativity in Performance (R. K. Sawyer, ed.). Greenwich, CT: Ablex Publishing Corp., 265-312.
- 1998. "Contemporary transformations of local linguistic communities." Annual Review of Anthropology.
- 2000. "Whorfianism and the linguistic imagination of nationality." In Regimes of Language.
- 2003a. "Indexical order and the dialectics of sociolinguistic life."
- 2003b. "The Whens and Wheres—as well as Hows—of Ethnolinguistic Recognition."
- 2003c. Talking Politics: The substance of style from Abe to "W". Chicago: Prickly Paradigm Press. ISBN 0-9717575-5-0.
- 2004a. "'Cultural' Concepts and the Language-Culture Nexus". Current Anthropology 45(5), 621-652.
- 2004b. "Boasian cosmographic anthropology and the sociocentric component of mind." In Significant Others: Interpersonal and Professional Commitments in Anthropology (Richard Handler, ed.), 131-157.
- 2005a. "Axes of Evals: Token versus Type Interdiscursivity." Journal of Linguistic Anthropology 15.1:6-22.
- 2005b. "Languages/Cultures are Dead! Long Live the Linguistic-Cultural!" In D. Segal & S. Yanagisako, eds., Unwrapping the Sacred Bundle: Reflections on the Disciplining of Anthropology. Durham: Duke University Press, 99-125. ISBN 0-8223-3474-7.
- 2005c. "The Poetics of Politics: 'Theirs' and 'Ours'."
- 2006a. "How we look from where we stand" (review article).
- 2006b. "Old wine, new ethnographic lexicography." Annual Review of Anthropology.
- 2022. Language in Culture. Cambridge University Press.
