= Norma Mendoza-Denton =

American linguist

Norma Catalina Mendoza-Denton (born 1968) is a professor of anthropology at the University of California, Los Angeles. She specializes in sociolinguistics and linguistic anthropology, including work in sociophonetics, language and identity, ethnography and visual anthropology.

== Biography ==
Mendoza-Denton earned a doctorate in linguistics from Stanford University in 1997 with the completion of her dissertation, Chicana/Mexicana Identity and Linguistic Variation: An Ethnographic and Sociolinguistic Study of Gang Affiliation in an Urban High School. She worked as an assistant professor at Ohio State University and at the University of Arizona before taking up a position at UCLA.

Her ethnographic and sociolinguistic analyses of Latina gang members in California are presented in her book Homegirls: Language and Cultural Practice Among Latina Youth Gangs. Mendoza-Denton was a consultant for the Do You Speak American? television program. In 2020, she published a collection of essays, co-edited with linguistic anthropologist Janet McIntosh, examining the politics of language during the Trump presidency.

== Honors and awards ==
Mendoza-Denton served as president of the Society for Linguistic Anthropology, a section of the American Anthropological Association, from 2011 to 2013. She has also been active in the Linguistic Society of America, including serving on the executive committee from 2018 through 2020.

In 2011 she received a National Institute for Civil Discourse grant for her work analyzing the ways in which politicians handle disagreements with their constituents.

== Publications and collaborations ==
- Mendoza-Denton, Norma and Scarlett Eisenhauer, Wesley Wilson, Cory Flores. 2017. Embodied Entanglements: Electrodermal Activity, Interaction, and Videogames. Journal of Sociolinguistics, 21(4), 547–575.
- Mendoza-Denton, Norma. 2017. Bad Hombres: Images of Masculinity and Historical Consciousness of U.S./Mexico Relations in the Age of Trump. HAU: Journal of Ethnographic Theory 7(1), 423–432.
- Mendoza-Denton, Norma. 2015. Sociopolitical Resources and Youth Movements. (1st author, with Aomar Boum). Annual Review of Anthropology 44, 295–310.
- Mendoza-Denton, Norma. 2011d. The Multiple Voices of Jane Hill. (2nd author, with Jennifer Roth-Gordon). Journal of Linguistic Anthropology 21(2), 157–165.
- Mendoza-Denton, Norma. 2011c. The Semiotic Hitchhiker’s Guide to Creaky Voice: Circulation and Gendered Hardcore in a Chicana/o Gang Persona. Journal of Linguistic Anthropology 21(2), 260–278.
- Mendoza-Denton, Norma. 2011b. Special Issue of the Journal of Linguistic Anthropology on the Work of Jane Hill. Co-edited with Jennifer Roth-Gordon.
- Mendoza-Denton, Norma. 2011b. Semiotic Layering Through Gesture and Intonation: A Case Study of Complementary and Supplementary Multimodality in Political Speech. (1st author, with Stefanie Jannedy) Journal of English Linguistics 39(3), 265 - 299.
- Mendoza-Denton, Norma. 2008. Homegirls: Language and Cultural Practice Among Latina Youth Gangs. Wiley-Blackwell.
- Mendoza-Denton, Norma. 2007. Sociolinguistic extensions of exemplar theory. In J. Cole and J. Hualde (eds.) Laboratory Phonology 9. Berlin: Walter de Gruyter.
- Jannedy, Stefanie and Norma Mendoza-Denton. 2006. Structuring information through gesture and intonation. Interdisciplinary Studies on Information Structure 3, 199–244.
- Mendoza-Denton, Norma. 2004. The anguish of normative gender. In M. Bucholtz (ed.), Language and Woman's Place II: Text and Commentaries. Oxford: Oxford University Press.
- Mendoza-Denton, Norma. 2001. Style. In A. Duranti (ed.), Key Terms in Language and Culture. London: Blackwell.
- Mendoza-Denton, Norma. 1996. "Muy macha": Gender and ideology in gang girls' discourse about makeup. Ethnos: Journal of Anthropology 6, 47–63.
