= Paul Kockelman =

- Title: Professor, Editor-in-Chief

Academic work
- Discipline: Anthropologist
- Sub-discipline: Linguistic anthropology Sociocultural anthropology
- Institutions: Yale University

Paul Kockelman is a professor of anthropology at Yale University. His work in linguistic anthropology includes the description and ethnographic analysis of Q’eqchi’, a Mayan language spoken in Guatemala. His contributions to anthropological theory have covered a wide range of themes, including agency, temporality, meaning, subjectivity, stance, value, and more recently the Anthropocene. Some of these writings, blending the concerns of semiotics and ethnography with those of mathematics and computer science, have been understood to have pushed the frontiers of anthropological theory. Kockelman has been described as "one of anthropology's last great system‐builders".

Kockelman has served as the editor-in-chief of the Journal of Linguistic Anthropology. He is also co-editor, with Nick Enfield and Jack Sidnell, of The Cambridge Handbook of Linguistic Anthropology.

== Selected publications ==
=== Books ===
- 2025, Mathematical Models of Meaning: A Dynamic Systems Approach to Possible World Semiotics, MIT Press.
- 2024, Last Words: Large Language Models and the AI Apocalypse, Prickly Paradigm Press.
- 2022, The Anthropology of Intensity, Cambridge University Press.
- 2020, Kinds of Value: An Experiment in Modal Anthropology, Prickly Paradigm Press.
- 2017, The Art of Interpretation in the Age of Computation, Oxford University Press.
- 2016, The Chicken and the Quetzal: Portable Values and Incommensurate Ontologies in Guatemala's Cloud Forests, Duke University Press.
- 2013, Agent, Person, Subject, Self: A Theory of Ontology, Interaction, and Infrastructure, Oxford University Press.
- 2010, Language, Culture, and Mind: Natural Constructions and Social Kinds, Cambridge University Press.
