= Ethnolinguistics =

Academic discipline

Ethnolinguistics (sometimes called cultural linguistics) is an area of anthropological linguistics that studies the relationship between a language or group of languages and the cultural practices of the people who speak those languages.

It examines how different cultures conceptualize and categorize their experiences, such as spatial orientation and environmental phenomena. Ethnolinguistics incorporates methods like ethnosemantics, which analyzes how people classify and label their world, and componential analysis, which dissects semantic features of terms to understand cultural meanings. The field intersects with cultural linguistics to investigate how language encodes cultural schemas and metaphors, influencing areas such as intercultural communication and language learning.

== Examples ==
Ethnolinguists study the way perception and conceptualization influence language and show how that is linked to different cultures and societies. An example is how spatial orientation is expressed in various cultures.

For example, in many societies, words for the cardinal directions east and west are derived from terms for sunrise/sunset. The nomenclature for cardinal directions of Inuit speakers of Greenland, however, is based on geographical landmarks such as the river system and one's position on the coast. Similarly, the Yurok lack the idea of cardinal directions; they orient themselves with respect to their principal geographic feature, the Klamath River.

== Cultural linguistics ==
Cultural Linguistics is a related branch of linguistics that explores the relationship between language and cultural conceptualisations. Cultural Linguistics draws on and expands the theoretical and analytical advancements in cognitive science (including complexity science and distributed cognition) and anthropology. Cultural Linguistics examines how various features of human languages encode cultural conceptualisations, including cultural schemas, cultural categories, and cultural metaphors. In Cultural Linguistics, language is viewed as deeply entrenched in the group-level, cultural cognition of communities of speakers. Thus far, the approach of Cultural Linguistics has been adopted in several areas of applied linguistic research, including intercultural communication, second language learning, Teaching English as an International Language, and World Englishes.

== Ethnosemantics ==
Ethnosemantics, also called ethnoscience and cognitive anthropology, is a method of ethnographic research and ethnolinguistics that focuses on semantics by examining how people categorize words in their language. Ethnosemantics studies the way people label and classify the cultural, social, and environmental phenomena in their world and analyze the semantic categories these classifications create in order to understand the cultural meanings behind the way people describe things in their world.

Ethnosemantics as a method relies on Franz Boas' theory of cultural relativity, as well as the theory of linguistic relativity. The use of cultural relativity in ethnosemantic analysis serves to focus analyses on individual cultures and their own language terms, rather than using ethnosemantics to create overarching theories of culture and how language affects culture.

=== Methods and examples ===
In order to perform ethnosemantic analysis, all of the words in a language that are used for a particular subject are gathered by the researcher and are used to create a model of how those words relate to one another. Anthropologists who utilize ethnosemantics to create these models believe that they are a representation of how speakers of a particular language think about the topic being described.

For example, in her book The Anthropology of Language: An Introduction to Linguistic Anthropology, Harriet Ottenheimer uses the concept of plants and how dandelions are categorized to explain how ethnosemantics can be used to examine the differences in how cultures think about certain topics. In her example, Ottenheimer describes how the topic "plants" can be divided into the two categories "lettuce" and "weeds". Ethnosemantics can help anthropologists to discover whether a particular culture categorizes "dandelions" as a "lettuce" or a "weed", and using this information can discover something about how that culture thinks about plants.

In one section of Oscar Lewis' La Vida, he includes the transcript of an interview with a Puerto Rican woman in which she discusses a prostitute's social world. Using ethnosemantics, the speaker's statements about the people in that social circle and their behavior can be analyzed in order to understand how she perceives and conceptualizes her social world. The first step in this analysis is to identify and map out all of the social categories or social identities the speaker identified. Once the social categories have been mapped, the next steps are to attempt to define the precise meaning of each category, examine how the speaker describes the relationship of categories, and analyze how she evaluates the characteristics of the people who are grouped in those social categories.

The speaker in this example identified three basic social categories (the rich, the law, and the poor) and characterized those people in the higher categories of "rich" and "law" as bad people. The poor are further divided into those with disreputable positions and those with reputable positions. The speaker characterizes the disreputable poor generally as dishonest and corrupt, but presents herself as one of the few exceptions. This analysis of the speaker's description of her social circle thus allows for an understanding of how she perceives the world around her and the people in it.

==== Componential analysis ====
The method of componential analysis in ethnosemantic analysis is used to describe the criteria people use to classify concepts by analyzing their semantic features. For example, the word "man" can be analyzed into the semantic features "male," "mature," and "human"; "woman" can be analyzed into "female," "mature," and "human"; "girl" can be analyzed into "female," "immature," and "human"; and "bull" can be analyzed into "male," "mature," and "bovine." By using this method, the features of words in a category can be examined to form hypotheses about the significant meaning and identifying features of words in that category.

== See also ==
- Anthropological linguistics
- Associative group analysis
- Evolutionary psychology of language
- Linguistic anthropology
- Ecolinguistics
- Wilhelm von Humboldt

== Sources ==
- Wierzbicka, Anna (1992) Semantics, Culture, and Cognition: Universal human concepts in culture-specific configuration. New York: Oxford University Press.
- Bartmiński, Jerzy. Aspects of Cognitive Ethnolinguistics. Sheffield and Oakville, CT: Equinox, 2009/2012.
- (en) Madeleine Mathiot (dir.), Ethnolinguistics: Boas, Sapir, and Whorf revisited, Mouton, La Haye, 1979, 323 p. (ISBN 978-90-279-7597-3)
- (fr) Luc Bouquiaux, Linguistique et ethnolinguistique : anthologie d'articles parus entre 1961 et 2003, Peeters, Louvain, Dudley, MA, 2004, 466 p.
- (fr) Christine Jourdan et Claire Lefebvre (dir.), « L'ethnolinguistique », in Anthropologie et sociétés, vol. 23, no 3, 1999, p. 5–173
- (fr) Bernard Pottier, L'ethnolinguistique (numéro spécial de la revue Langages), Didier, 1970, 130 p.
- Amsterdam/Philadelphia: John Benjamins.
- Trabant, Jürgen, Humboldt ou le sens du langage, Liège: Madarga, 1992.
- Trabant, Jürgen, Traditions de Humboldt, (German edition 1990), French edition, Paris: Maison des sciences de l'homme, 1999.
- Trabant, Jürgen, Mithridates im Paradies: Kleine Geschichte des Sprachdenkens, München: Beck, 2003.
- Trabant, Jürgen, 'L'antinomie linguistique: quelques enjeux politiques', Politiques & Usages de la Langue en Europe, ed. Michael Werner, Condé-sur-Noireau: Collection du Ciera, Dialogiques, Éditions de la Maison des sciences de l'homme, 2007.
- Trabant, Jürgen, Was ist Sprache?, München: Beck, 2008.
- Vocabulaire européen des philosophes, Dictionnaires des intraduisibles, ed. Barbara Cassin, Paris: Robert, 2004.
- Whorf, Benjamin Lee, Language, Thought and Reality: Selected Writings (1956), ed. John B. Caroll, Cambridge, Massachusetts: M.I.T. Press, 1984.
- Wierzbicka, Anna, Semantics, Culture, and Cognition: Universal Human Concepts in Culture-Specific Configurations, New York, Oxford University Press, 1992.
- Wierzbicka, Anna, Understanding Cultures through their Key Words, Oxford: Oxford University Press, 1997.
- Wierzbicka, Anna, Emotions across Languages and Cultures, Cambridge: Cambridge University Press, 1999.
- Wierzbicka, Anna, Semantics: Primes and Universals (1996), Oxford: Oxford University Press, 2004.
- Wierzbicka, Anna, Experience, Evidence & Sense: The Hidden Cultural Legacy of English, Oxford: Oxford University Press, 2010.
