= Linguistic Systems =

Linguistic Systems, Inc., also known as LSI, provides language translation services (conversion) for all media in over 115 languages. LSI focuses on the translation of legal, medical, business, institutional, academic, government and personal documents. LSI is headquartered in Cambridge, Massachusetts.

== About LSI ==
Linguistic Systems, Inc. (LSI) was founded in 1967 by Martin Roberts.

LSI translates to/from 115 languages, DTP, audio-visual conversions, software localization, consecutive and simultaneous interpreting services, foreign brand name analysis, and machine translation with post-editing.

LSI has provided translation services to over half of the Fortune 500 companies and most of the Fortune 100. Among its clients are AT&T, Boeing, Citigroup, Coca-Cola, DuPont, Exxon-Mobil, General Electric, General Motors, Hewlett-Packard, IBM, Johnson & Johnson, Pfizer, Procter & Gamble, Simon & Schuster, Time Warner, Verizon, and Walmart.

As of 2013, LSI had a network of more than 7,000 translators who translate into their native languages; These include lawyers, scientists, engineers, and other bilingual professionals.
