= Linguistic anthropology =

Study of how language influences social life

Linguistic anthropology is the interdisciplinary study of how language influences social life. It is a branch of anthropology that originated from the endeavor to document endangered languages and has grown over the past century to encompass most aspects of language structure and use.

Linguistic anthropology explores how language shapes communication, forms social identity and group membership, organizes large-scale cultural beliefs and ideologies, and develops a common cultural representation of natural and social worlds.

== Historical development ==
Linguistic anthropology emerged from the development of three distinct paradigms that have set the standard for approaching linguistic anthropology. The first, now known as "anthropological linguistics," focuses on the documentation of languages. The second, known as "linguistic anthropology," engages in theoretical studies of language use. The third, which has been developed over the past two or three decades, studies issues from other subfields of anthropology with linguistic considerations. Though they developed sequentially, all three paradigms are still practiced today.

=== First paradigm: anthropological linguistics ===
The first paradigm, anthropological linguistics, is devoted to themes unique to the sub-discipline. This area includes documentation of languages that have been seen as at-risk for extinction, with a particular focus on indigenous languages of native North American tribes. It is also the paradigm most focused on linguistics. Linguistic themes include the following:

- Grammatical description
- Typological classification
- Linguistic relativity

=== Second paradigm: linguistic anthropology ===
The second paradigm can be marked by reversing the words. Going from anthropological linguistics to linguistic anthropology, signals a more anthropological focus on the study. This term was preferred by Dell Hymes, who was also responsible with John Gumperz for the idea of ethnography of communication. The term linguistic anthropology reflected Hymes' vision of a future in which language would be studied in the context of the situation and relative to the community speaking it. The new era would involve many new technological developments, such as mechanical recording.

This paradigm developed in critical dialogue with the fields of folklore on the one hand and linguistics on the other. Hymes criticized folklorists' fixation on oral texts rather than the verbal artistry of performance. At the same time, he criticized the cognitivist shift in linguistics heralded by the pioneering work of Noam Chomsky, arguing for an ethnographic focus on language in use.

Hymes had many revolutionary contributions to linguistic anthropology, the first of which was a new unit of analysis. Unlike the first paradigm, which focused on linguistic tools like measuring of phonemes and morphemess the second paradigm's unit of analysis was the "speech event." A speech event is defined as one with speech presented for a significant duration throughout its occurrence (ex., a lecture or debate). This is different from a speech situation, where speech could possibly occur (ex., dinner). Hymes also pioneered a linguistic anthropological approach to ethnopoetics. Hymes had hoped that this paradigm would link linguistic anthropology more to anthropology. However, Hymes' ambition backfired as the second paradigm marked a distancing of the sub-discipline from the rest of anthropology.

=== Third paradigm: anthropological issues studied via linguistic methods and data ===
The third paradigm, which began in the late 1980s, has redirected the primary focus on anthropology by providing a linguistic approach to anthropological issues. Rather than prioritizing the technical components of language, the third paradigm has anthropologists focus on studying culture through the use of linguistic tools. Themes include:

- investigations of personal and social identities
- shared ideologies
- construction of narrative interactions among individuals

Furthermore, similar to how the second paradigm used new technology in its studies, the third paradigm includes the heavy use of video documentation to support research.

== Areas of interest ==
Contemporary linguistic anthropology continues research in all three paradigms described above:

1. Documentation of languages
2. Study of language through context
3. The study of identity through linguistic means

The third paradigm, the study of anthropological issues through linguistic means, is an affluent area of study for current linguistic anthropologists.

=== Identity and intersubjectivity ===
A great deal of work in linguistic anthropology investigates questions of sociocultural identity linguistically and discursively. The linguistic anthropologist Don Kulick has done so in relation to identity, for example, in a series of settings, first in a village called Gapun in northern Papua New Guinea. He explored how the use of two languages with and around children in Gapun village: the traditional language (Taiap), not spoken anywhere but in their own village and thus primordially "indexical" of Gapuner identity, and Tok Pisin, the widely circulating official language of New Guinea. ("indexical" points to meanings beyond the immediate context.)

Speaking the Taiap language is associated with one identity: not only local but also "Backward" and an identity based on the display of hed (personal autonomy). To speak Tok Pisin is to index a modern, Catholic identity, based not on hed but on save, an identity linked with the will and the skill to co-operate. In later work, Kulick demonstrates that through certain loud speech performances in Brazil called um escândalo, Brazilian travesti (roughly 'transvestite') sex workers shame clients. The travesti community, according to the argument, ends up at least making a powerful attempt to transcend the shame the larger Brazilian public might try to foist off on them, again by loud public discourse and other modes of performance.

In addition, scholars such as Émile Benveniste, Mary Bucholtz and Kira Hall Benjamin Lee, Paul Kockelman, and Stanton Wortham (among many others) have contributed to understandings of identity as "intersubjectivity" by examining the ways it is discursively constructed.

=== Socialization ===
In a series of studies, the linguistic anthropologists Elinor Ochs and Bambi Schieffelin addressed the anthropological topic of socialization (the process by which infants, children, and foreigners become members of a community and learn to participate in its culture) by using linguistic and other ethnographic methods. They discovered that the processes of enculturation and socialization do not occur apart from the process of language acquisition, but that children acquire language and culture together in what amounts to an integrated process. Ochs and Schieffelin demonstrated that baby talk is not universal and that the direction of adaptation (whether the child is made to adapt to the ongoing situation of speech around it or vice versa) is a variable that correlated, for example, with the direction it was held towards a caregiver's body. In many societies, caregivers hold a child facing outward as to orient it to a network of kin that it must learn to recognize early in life.

Ochs and Schieffelin demonstrated that members of all societies socialize children both to and through the use of language. Ochs and Schieffelin uncovered how, through naturally occurring stories told during dinners in white middle-class households in Southern California, both mothers and fathers participated in replicating male dominance (the "father knows best" syndrome) by the distribution of participant roles such as protagonist (often a child but sometimes mother and almost never the father) and "problematizer" (often the father, who raised uncomfortable questions or challenged the competence of the protagonist). When mothers collaborated with children to get their stories told, they unwittingly set themselves up to be subject to the process.

Schieffelin's more recent research has uncovered the socializing role of pastors and other fairly new Christian converts among the Bosavi community of the Southern Highlands in Papua New Guinea. Pastors have introduced new ways of conveying knowledge, new linguistic epistemic markers, and new ways of speaking about time. According to Schieffelin, the converts struggled with and largely resisted parts of the Bible that speak of being able to know the inner states of others, such as the Gospel of Mark, Chapter 2, Verses 6–8.

=== Ideologies ===
In a third example of the current (third) paradigm, since Roman Jakobson's student Michael Silverstein opened the way, there has been an increase in the work done by linguistic anthropologists on the major anthropological theme of ideologies,—in this case "language ideologies", sometimes defined as "shared bodies of commonsense notions about the nature of language in the world." Silverstein has demonstrated that these ideologies are not mere false consciousness but actually influence the evolution of linguistic structures, including the dropping of "thee" and "thou" from everyday English usage. Woolard, in her overview of "code switching", or the systematic practice of alternating linguistic varieties within a conversation or even a single utterance, finds the underlying question anthropologists ask of the practice—Why do they do that?—reflects a dominant linguistic ideology. It is the ideology that people should "really" be monoglot and efficiently targeted toward referential clarity rather than diverting themselves with the messiness of multiple varieties in play at a single time.

Much research on linguistic ideologies probes subtler influences on language, such as the pull exerted on Tewa, a Kiowa-Tanoan language spoken in certain New Mexican pueblos and on the Hopi Reservation in Arizona, by "kiva speech", discussed in the next section.

Other linguists have carried out research in the areas of language contact, language endangerment, and 'English as a global language'. For instance, the Indian linguist Braj Kachru investigated local varieties of English in South Asia and the ways in which English functions as a lingua franca among multicultural groups in India. British linguist David Crystal has contributed to investigations of language death attention to the effects of cultural assimilation resulting in the spread of one dominant language in situations of colonialism.

=== Heritage language ideologies ===
More recently, a new line of ideology work is beginning to enter the field of linguistics in relation to heritage languages. Specifically, the applied linguist Martin Guardado has posited that heritage language ideologies are "somewhat fluid sets of understandings, justifications, beliefs, and judgments that linguistic minorities hold about their languages." Guardado goes on to argue that ideologies of heritage languages also contain the expectations and desires of linguistic minority families "regarding the relevance of these languages in their children’s lives as well as when, where, how, and to what ends these languages should be used." Although this is arguably a fledgling line of language ideology research, this work is poised to contribute to the understanding of how ideologies of language operate in a variety of settings.

=== Social space ===
In a final example of this third paradigm, a group of linguistic anthropologists have done very creative work on the idea of social space. Duranti published a groundbreaking article on Samoan greetings and their use and transformation of social space. The Indonesianist Joseph Errington, making use of earlier work by Indonesianists who were not necessarily concerned with language issues per se, had brought linguistic anthropological methods (and semiotic theory) to bear on the notion of the exemplary center, the center of political and ritual power from which emanated exemplary behavior. Errington demonstrated how the Javanese priyayi, whose ancestors served at the Javanese royal courts, became emissaries, so to speak, long after those courts had ceased to exist, representing throughout Java the highest example of "refined speech." The work of Joel Kuipers develops this theme vis-a-vis the island of Sumba, Indonesia. Even though it pertains to Tewa Indians in Arizona, rather than to Indonesians, Paul Kroskrity's argument that speech forms originating in the Tewa kiva (or underground ceremonial space) forms the dominant model for all Tewa speech can be seen as a direct parallel.

Silverstein tries to find the maximum theoretical significance and applicability in this idea of exemplary centers. He feels, in fact, that the exemplary center idea is one of linguistic anthropology's three most important findings. He generalizes the notion thus, arguing, "there are wider-scale institutional 'orders of interactionality,' historically contingent yet structured. Within such large-scale, macrosocial orders, in-effect ritual centers of semiosis come to exert a structuring, value-conferring influence on any particular event of discursive interaction with respect to the meanings and significance of the verbal and other semiotic forms used in it." Current approaches to such classic anthropological topics as ritual by linguistic anthropologists emphasize not static linguistic structures but the unfolding in realtime of a "'hypertrophic' set of parallel orders of iconicity and indexicality that seem to cause the ritual to create its own sacred space through what appears, often, to be the magic of textual and nontextual metricalizations, synchronized."

=== Race, class, and gender ===
Addressing the broad central concerns of the subfield and drawing from its core theories, many scholars focus on the intersections of language and the particularly salient social constructs of race (and ethnicity), class, and gender (and sexuality). These works generally consider the roles of social structures (e.g., ideologies and institutions) related to race, class, and gender (e.g., marriage, labor, pop culture, education) in terms of their constructions and in terms of individuals' lived experiences. A short list of linguistic anthropological texts that address these topics follows:

==== Race and ethnicity ====
- Alim, H. Samy, John R. Rickford, and Arnetha F. Ball. 2016. Raciolinguistics: How Language Shapes Our Ideas about Race. Oxford University Press.
- Bucholtz, Mary. 2001. "The Whiteness of Nerds: Superstandard English and Racial Markedness." Journal of Linguistic Anthropology 11 (1): 84–100. doi:10.1525/jlin.2001.11.1.84.
- Bucholtz, Mary. 2010. White Kids: Language, Race, and Styles of Youth Identity. Cambridge University Press.
- Davis, Jenny L. 2018. Talking Indian: Identity and Language Revitalization in the Chickasaw Renaissance. University of Arizona Press.
- Dick, H. 2011. "Making Immigrants Illegal in Small-Town USA." Journal of Linguistic Anthropology. 21(S1):E35-E55.
- Hill, Jane H. 1998. "Language, Race, and White Public Space." American Anthropologist 100 (3): 680–89. doi:10.1525/aa.1998.100.3.680.
- Hill, Jane H. 2008. The Everyday Language of White Racism. Wiley-Blackwell.
- García-Sánchez, Inmaculada M. 2014. Language and Muslim Immigrant Childhoods: The Politics of Belonging. John Wiley & Sons.
- Ibrahim, Awad. 2014. The Rhizome of Blackness: A Critical Ethnography of Hip-Hop Culture, Language, Identity, and the Politics of Becoming. 1 edition. New York: Peter Lang Publishing Inc.
- Rosa, Jonathan. 2019. Looking like a Language, Sounding like a Race: Raciolinguistic Ideologies and the Learning of Latinidad. Oxford University Press.
- Smalls, Krystal. 2018. "Fighting Words: Antiblackness and Discursive Violence in an American High School." Journal of Linguistic Anthropology. 23(3):356-383.
- Spears, Arthur Kean. 1999. Race and Ideology: Language, Symbolism, and Popular Culture. Wayne State University Press.
- Urciuoli, Bonnie. 2013. Exposing Prejudice: Puerto Rican Experiences of Language, Race, and Class. Waveland Press.
- Wirtz, Kristina. 2011. "Cuban Performances of Blackness as the Timeless Past Still Among Us." Journal of Linguistic Anthropology. 21(S1):E11-E34.

==== Class ====
- Fox, Aaron A. 2004. Real Country: Music and Language in Working-Class Culture. Duke University Press.
- Shankar, Shalini. 2008. Desi Land: Teen Culture, Class, and Success in Silicon Valley. Duke University Press.
- Nakassis, Constantine V. 2016. Doing Style: Youth and Mass Mediation in South India. University of Chicago Press.

==== Gender and sexuality ====
- Bucholtz, Mary. 1999. "'Why be normal?': Language and Identity Practices in a Community of Nerd Girls". Language in Society. 28 (2): 207–210.
- Fader, Ayala. 2009. Mitzvah Girls: Bringing Up the Next Generation of Hasidic Jews in Brooklyn. Princeton University Press.
- Gaudio, Rudolf Pell. 2011. Allah Made Us: Sexual Outlaws in an Islamic African City. John Wiley & Sons.
- Hall, Kira, and Mary Bucholtz. 1995. Gender Articulated: Language and the Socially Constructed Self. New York: Routledge.
- Jacobs-Huey, Lanita. 2006. From the Kitchen to the Parlor: Language and Becoming in African American Women's Hair Care. Oxford University Press.
- Kulick, Don. 2000. "Gay and Lesbian Language." Annual Review of Anthropology 29 (1): 243–85. doi:10.1146/annurev.anthro.29.1.243.
- Kulick, Don. 2008. "Gender Politics." Men and Masculinities 11 (2): 186–92. doi:10.1177/1097184X08315098.
- Kulick, Don. 1997. "The Gender of Brazilian Transgendered Prostitutes." American Anthropologist 99 (3): 574–85.
- Livia, Anna, and Kira Hall. 1997. Queerly Phrased: Language, Gender, and Sexuality. Oxford University Press.
- Manalansan, Martin F. IV. "'Performing' the Filipino Gay Experiences in America: Linguistic Strategies in a Transnational Context." Beyond the Lavender Lexicon: Authenticity, Imagination and Appropriation in Lesbian and Gay Language. Ed. William L Leap. New York: Gordon and Breach, 1997. 249–266
- Mendoza-Denton, Norma. 2014. Homegirls: Language and Cultural Practice Among Latina Youth Gangs. John Wiley & Sons.
- Rampton, Ben. 1995. Crossing: Language and Ethnicity Among Adolescents. Longman.
- Zimman, Lal, Jenny L. Davis, and Joshua Raclaw. 2014. Queer Excursions: Retheorizing Binaries in Language, Gender, and Sexuality. Oxford University Press.

=== Ethnopoetics ===
Ethnopoetics is a method of recording text versions of oral poetry or narrative performances (i.e. verbal lore) that uses poetic lines, verses, and stanzas (instead of prose paragraphs) to capture the formal, poetic performance elements which would otherwise be lost in the written texts. The goal of any ethnopoetic text is to show how the techniques of unique oral performers enhance the aesthetic value of their performances within their specific cultural contexts. Major contributors to ethnopoetic theory include Jerome Rothenberg, Dennis Tedlock, and Dell Hymes. Ethnopoetics is considered a subfield of ethnology, anthropology, folkloristics, stylistics, linguistics, and literature and translation studies.

=== Endangered languages: language documentation and revitalization ===
Endangered languages are languages that are not being passed down to children as their mother tongue or that have declining numbers of speakers for a variety of reasons. Therefore, after a couple generations these languages may no longer be spoken. Anthropologists have been involved with endangered language communities through their involvement in language documentation and revitalization projects.

In a language documentation project, researchers work to develop records of the language - these records could be field notes and audio or video recordings. To follow best practices of documentation, these records should be clearly annotated and kept safe within an archive of some kind. Franz Boas was one of the first anthropologists involved in language documentation within North America and he supported the development of three key materials: 1) grammars, 2) texts, and 3) dictionaries. This is now known as the Boasian Trilogy.

Language revitalization is the practice of bringing a language back into common use. The revitalization efforts can take the form of teaching the language to new speakers or encouraging the continued use within the community. One example of a language revitalization project is the Lenape language course taught at Swarthmore College, Pennsylvania. The course aims to educate indigenous and non-indigenous students about the Lenape language and culture.

Language reclamation, as a subset of revitalization, implies that a language has been taken away from a community and addresses their concern in taking back the agency to revitalize their language on their own terms. Language reclamation addresses the power dynamics associated with language loss. Encouraging those who already know the language to use it, increasing the domains of usage, and increasing the overall prestige of the language are all components of reclamation. One example of this is the Miami language being brought back from 'extinct' status through extensive archives.

While the field of linguistics has also been focused on the study of the linguistic structures of endangered languages, anthropologists also contribute to this field through their emphasize on ethnographic understandings of the socio-historical context of language endangerment, but also of language revitalization and reclamation projects.

== See also ==
- Ethnolinguistics
- Evolutionary psychology of language
- Linguistic insecurity
- List of important publications in anthropology
- Miyako Inoue
- Semiotic anthropology
- Sociocultural linguistics
- Sociolinguistics
- Sociology of language
- World Oral Literature Project
