= Observational methods in psychology =

Observational methods in psychological research entail the observation and description of a subject's behavior. Researchers utilizing the observational method can exert varying amounts of control over the environment in which the observation takes place. This makes observational research a sort of middle ground between the highly controlled method of experimental design and the less structured approach of conducting interviews.

== Sampling behavior ==
=== Time sampling ===
Time sampling is a sampling method that involves the acquisition of representative samples by observing subjects at different time intervals. These time intervals can be chosen randomly or systematically. If a researcher chooses to use systematic time sampling, the information obtained would only generalize to the one time period in which the observation took place. In contrast, the goal of random time sampling would be to be able to generalize across all times of observation. Depending on the type of study being conducted, either type of time sampling can be appropriate.

An advantage to using time sampling is that researchers gain the ability to control the contexts to which they will eventually be able to generalize. However, time sampling is not useful if the event pertaining to the research question occurs infrequently or unpredictably, because one will often miss the event in the short time period of observation. In this scenario, event sampling is more useful. In this style of sampling, the researcher lets the event determine when the observations will take place. For example: if the research question involves observing behavior during a specific holiday, one would use event sampling instead of time sampling.

=== Situation sampling ===
Situation sampling involves the study of behavior in many different locations, and under different circumstances and conditions. By sampling different situations, researchers reduce the chance that the results they obtain will be particular to a certain set of circumstances or conditions. For this reason, situation sampling significantly increases the external validity of observational findings. Compared to when researchers only observe particular types of individuals, researchers using situation sampling can increase the diversity of subjects within their observed sample. Researchers may determine which subjects to observe by either selecting subjects systematically (every 10th student in a cafeteria, for example) or randomly, with the goal of obtaining a representative sample of all subjects.

For a good example of situation sampling, see this study by LaFrance and Mayo concerning the differences in the use of gaze direction as a regulatory mechanism in conversation. In this study, pairs of individuals were observed in college cafeterias, restaurants, airport and hospital waiting rooms, and business-district fast-food outlets. By using situation sampling, the investigators were able to observe a wide range of people who differed in age, sex, race, and socioeconomic class, thus increasing the external validity of their research findings.

== Direct observational methods ==
=== Observation without intervention ===
If researchers wish to study how subjects normally behave in a given setting, they will want to utilize observation without intervention, also known as naturalistic observation. This type of observation is useful because it allows observers to see how individuals act in natural settings, rather than in the more artificial setting of a lab or experiment. A natural setting can be defined as a place in which behavior ordinarily occurs and that has not been arranged specifically for the purpose of observing behavior. Direct observation is also necessary if researchers want to study something that is unethical to control for in a lab. For instance, the IRB does not allow researchers interested in investigating verbal abuse between adolescent couples to place couples in laboratory settings where verbal abuse is encouraged. However, by placing oneself in a public space where this abuse may occur, one can observe this behavior without being responsible for causing it. Naturalistic observation can also be used to verify external validity, permitting researchers to examine whether study findings generalize to real world scenarios. Naturalistic observation may also be conducted in lieu of structured experiments when implementing an experiment that would be too costly. Observations without intervention may be either overt (meaning that subjects are aware they are being observed) or covert (meaning that subjects are not aware).

There are several disadvantages and limitations to naturalistic observation. One is that it does not allow researchers to make causal statements about the situations they observe. For this reason, behavior can only be described, not explained. Furthermore, there are ethical concerns related to observing individuals without their consent. One way to avoid this problem is to debrief subjects after observing them, and ask for their consent then, before using the observations for research. This tactic would also help avoid one of the pitfalls of overt observation, in which observers ask for consent before observation has started. In these situations, when subjects know they are being watched, they may alter their behavior in an attempt to make themselves look more admirable. Naturalistic observation may also be time consuming, sometimes requiring dozens of observation sessions lasting large parts of each day to collect information on the behavior of interest. Lastly, because behavior is perceived so subjectively, it is possible that different observers notice different things, or draw different conclusions from their observations.

=== Observation with intervention ===
Most psychological research uses observation with some component of intervention. Reasons for intervening include:to precipitate or cause an event that normally occurs infrequently in nature or is difficult to observe; to systematically vary the qualities of a stimulus event so as to investigate the limits of an organism's response; to gain access to a situation or event that is generally closed to scientific observation; to arrange conditions so that important antecedent events are controlled and consequent behaviors can be readily observed; and to establish a comparison by manipulating independent variables to determine their effects on behavior. There are three different methods of direction observation with intervention: participant observation, structured observation, and field experiments.

==== Participant observation ====
Participate observation is characterized as either undisguised or disguised. In undisguised observation, the observed individuals know that the observer is present for the purpose of collecting info about their behavior. This technique is often used to understand the culture and behavior of groups or individuals. In contrast, in disguised observation, the observed individuals do not know that they are being observed. This technique is often used when researchers believe that the individuals under observation may change their behavior as a result of knowing that they were being recorded. For a great example of disguised research, see the Rosenhan experiment in which several researchers seek admission to twelve different mental hospitals to observe patient-staff interactions and patient diagnosing and releasing procedures. There are several benefits to doing participant observation. Firstly, participant research allows researchers to observe behaviors and situations that are not usually open to scientific observation. Furthermore, participant research allows the observer to have the same experiences as the people under study, which may provide important insights and understandings of individuals or groups. However, there are also several drawbacks to doing participant observation. Firstly, participant observers may sometimes lose their objectivity as a result of participating in the study. This usually happens when observers begin to identify with the individuals under study, and this threat generally increases as the degree of observer participation increases. Secondly, participant observers may unduly influence the individuals whose behavior they are recording. This effect is not easily assessed, however, it generally more prominent when the group being observed is small, or if the activities of the participant observer are prominent. Lastly, disguised observation raises some ethical issues regarding obtaining information without respondents' knowledge. For example, the observations collected by an observer participating in an internet chat room discussing how racists advocate racial violence may be seen as incriminating evidence collected without the respondents' knowledge. The dilemma here is of course that if informed consent were obtained from participants, respondents would likely choose not to cooperate.

==== Structured observation ====
Structured observation represents a compromise between the passive nonintervention of naturalistic observation, and the systematic manipulation of independent variables and precise control characterized by lab experiments. Structured observation may occur in a natural or laboratory setting. Within structured observation, often the observer intervenes in order to cause an event to occur, or to "set up" a situation so that events can be more easily recorded than they would be without intervention. Such a situation often makes use of a confederate who creates a situation for observing behavior. Structured observation is frequently employed by clinical and developmental psychologists, or for studying animals in the wild. One benefit to structured observation is that it allows researchers to record behaviors that may be difficult to observe using naturalistic observation, but that are more natural than the artificial conditions imposed in a lab. However, problems in interpreting structured observations can occur when the same observation procedures are not followed across observations or observers, or when important variables are not controlled across observations.

==== Field experiments ====
In field experiments, researchers manipulate one or more independent variables in a natural setting to determine the effect on behavior. This method represents the most extreme form of intervention in observational methods, and researchers are able to exert more control over the study and its participants. Conducting field experiments allows researchers to make causal inferences from their results, and therefore increases external validity. However, confounding may decrease internal validity of a study, and ethical issues may arise in studies involving high-risk. For a great example of a field experiment study, see this study by Milgram, Liberty, Toledo, and Wackenhut exploring the relation between the unique spatial configuration of the queue and the means by which its integrity is defended. as well as one who predict the future.

== Indirect observational methods ==
Indirect observation can be used if one wishes to be entirely unobtrusive in their observation method. This can often be useful if a researcher is approaching a particularly sensitive topic that would be likely to elicit reactivity in the subject. There are also potential ethical concerns that are avoided by using the indirect observational method.

=== Physical trace evidence ===
The investigation of physical trace evidence involves examining the remnants of the subject's past behavior. These remnants could be any number of items, and are usually divided into two main categories. Use traces indicate the use or non-use of an item. Fingerprints, for example, fall into the category of use traces, along with candy wrappers, cigarette cartons, and countless other objects. In contrast, products are the creations or artifacts of behavior. An example of a product might be a painting, a song, a dance or television. Whereas use traces tell us more about the behavior of an individual, products speak more to contemporary cultural themes.

Examining physical trace evidence is an invaluable tool to psychologists, for they can gain information in this manner that they might not normally be able to obtain through other observational techniques. One issue with this method of research is the matter of validity. It may not always be the case that physical traces accurately inform us about people's behavior, and supplementary evidence is needed when acquiring physical trace evidence in order to substantiate your findings.

=== Archival records ===
Archival records are the documents that describe the activities of people at a certain time point or time period. Running records are continuously updated. Episodic records, on the other hand, describe specific events that only happened once.

Archival records are especially useful since they can be used as supplementary evidence for physical trace evidence. This keeps the whole data collection process of the observational study entirely unobtrusive. However, one must also be wary of the risk of selective deposit, which is the selective addition and omission of information to an archival record. There could be easily overlooked biases inherent in many archival records.

== Recording behavior ==
There are both qualitative and quantitative means of recording observations. To communicate qualitative information, observers rely on narrative records. This may consist of video footage, audio recordings, or field notes. Video footage, for instance, is helpful in reducing the effect that the observers presence may have on subjects. Quantitative measures can be recorded through measurement scales. Observers may be interested in making checklists, marking how frequently a certain behavior occurs, or how long it lasts.

== Biases and observer influences ==
=== Inter-observer reliability ===
Inter-observer reliability is the extent to which two or more observers agree with each other. Researchers can help foster higher interobserver reliability if they clearly define the constructs they are interested in measuring. If there is low inter-observer reliability, it is likely that the construct being observed is too ambiguous, and the observers are all imparting their own interpretations. For instance, in Donna Eder's study on peer relations and popularity for middle school girls, it was important that observers internalized a uniform definition of "friendship" and "popularity". While it is possible for multiple people to agree about something and all be incorrect, the more people that agree the less likely it is that they will be in error.

Having a clear coding system is key to achieving high levels of inter-observer reliability. Observers and researchers must come to a consensus ahead of time regarding how behaviors are defined, and what constructs these behaviors represent. For example, in Thomas Dishion's study on the cyclical nature of deviancy in male adolescent dyads, he explicitly defines the ways in which each behavior was recorded and coded. A "pause," for instance, was defined as three or more seconds of silence; a "laugh" coded for all positive affective reactions. This is the level of detail that must be attained when creating a coding system for a particular study.

=== Reactivity ===
In observation studies, individuals may change their behaviour in response to being observed. Their behaviour is therefore no longer representative, as it has changed due to the presence of the observer.

=== Observer bias ===
Inherent in conducting observational research is the risk of observer bias influencing your study's results. The main observer biases to be wary of are expectancy effects. When the observer has an expectation as to what they will observe, they are more likely to report that they saw what they expected.

One of the best ways to deal with observer biases is to acknowledge their existence and actively combat their effects. Using blind observers is an excellent technique. Observers are blind if they do not know the research hypotheses of the study. If you actively avoid giving your observers reason to expect a certain outcome, expectancy effects are greatly diminished.

== Studies for reference ==
Naturalistic observation

- Hartup, W. W. (1974). Aggression in childhood: Development perspectives. American Psychologist, 29, 336–341.

Participant observation

- Rosenhan, D. L. (1973). On being sane in insane places. Science, 179, 250–258.
- Eder, D. (1985). The cycle of popularity: Interpersonal relations among female adolescents. Sociology of Education, 58(3), 154–165.

Physical trace observation

- Friedman, M. P., & Wilson, R. W. (1975). Application of unobtrusive measures to the study of textbook usage by college students. Journal of Applied Psychology, 60, 659–662.

Products

- Rozin, P, Kabnik, K, Pete, E, Fischler, C, Shields, C, (2003). The ecology of eating: smaller portion sizes in France than in the United States help explain the French Paradox. Journal of Psychological Science, 14(5), 450–454.

Structured observation

- Piaget, J. (1965). The child's conception of number. New York: Norton.
- Dishion, T.J., Spracklen, K.M., Andrews, D.W., Patterson, G.R. (1996). Deviancy training in male adolescent friendships. Behavior Therapy, 27, 373–390.
- Simons, D., Levin, D. (1998). Failure to detect changes to people during a real-world interaction. Psychonomic Bulletin and Review, 5 (4), 644–649.

Field Experiments

- Milgram, S., Liberty, H., Toledo, R., Wackenhut, J. (1986). Response to intrusion into waiting lines. Journal of Personality and Social Psychology, Vol 51(4), 683–689.

Situation Sampling

- LaFrance, M., Mayo, C. (1976) Racial differences in gaze behavior during conversations: Two systematic observational studies. Journal of Personality and Social Psychology, Vol 33(5), May 1976, 547–552.
