= Associative group analysis =

Associative group analysis (AGA) is an inferential approach to analyze people's mental representations, focusing on subjective meanings and images to assess similarities and differences across cultures and belief systems. Culture can be regarded as "a group-specific cognitive organization or world view composed of the mosaic elements of meanings ". A language, as a communication tool in daily life, contains culturally specific meanings for people who use it. The words people use reflect not only their cognitions, but also their affections and behavioral intentions. To understand differences in psychological meaning across cultures, it is useful to analyze words in a language. The words people use reflect their thinking or feeling. Thinking, or more precisely the cognitive process, together with feeling, guides most of human behavior. By using AGA, we are able to understand how different groups organize and integrate their perceptions and understandings of the world around them.

AGA assumes a close relationship between people's subjective understandings and their behavior. The verbal associations are determined largely by a decoding of meaning reaction. The disposition of associations then guides the overt reaction. AGA defines the stimulus word as the unit of analysis (rather than individuals, groups, or society, etc.) and as the key unit in the perceptual representational system. By analyzing free verbal associations, researchers can determine the vertical and horizontal structure of the belief system.

== Perceptual representational system ==
The perceptual representational system includes what people perceive and think about an issue, object, behavior, etc. It is an inclusive worldview, composed of interdependent, representational units. There are three characteristics central to the perceptual-representational system.

=== Hierarchy of priorities ===
Among the representational units, some are more salient or dominant than others. For example, "Free market" is more salient to capitalistic countries than to communist countries.

=== Relatedness or affinity ===
Some units cluster into a larger category, sharing similar meanings and thus increasing the strength of selected views and beliefs. For example, the theme "Self" to some groups denotes individual self since people might associate this word with "Me", "Individual", "Esteem", "Person", etc. However, for other groups of people, the concept of self is a social self. They associate it with "Society", "Family", "Responsibility", etc. These clusters identify the culture, beliefs, and assumptions that can help us predict areas of motivation, vulnerability, need and concern within the group.

=== Affect loading ===
The representational units are tinted with emotions, feelings and evaluations. E.g., "Marijuana" may convey negative images like "hell" or "illegal" for some groups of people where its usage is illegal, but neutral meanings for others.

From the above three characteristics, the AGA method focuses on three main categories of information:

1. The meaning composition of selected themes.
2. The dominance of themes (i.e., the relative positions in a vertical dimension of priorities).
3. The relationship among themes and among their natural clusters (i.e., the horizontal patterns of affinities)

== Sampling ==
AGA is not used as a survey instrument. It is a sociological approach, with the primary goal of assessing people's subjective representation of their experiences as conveyed by their priorities, perceptions, and meanings. Therefore, the AGA approach is closer to anthropological strategies that intensively assess culturally representative small groups rather than to strategies that use carefully organized large samples. Since statistical significance is not the primary concern, a sample of 50 to 100 respondents is sufficient. However, if the group is quite heterogeneous with considerable variation among subjects, a larger number of subjects is needed.

== Data collection procedure ==
Subjects are given a card with stimulus word (theme) in their native language. Each card lists one theme on multiple lines and includes space for writing down subjects’ free associations to the stimulus word. Cards are given in a random order and subjects are told to give any response that occurred to them in the context of the theme within one minute. After one minute, another card is given. To conduct a reasonably comprehensive study, 50 to 100 themes should be presented. For an in-depth study, 100 to 200 systematically selected themes are required.

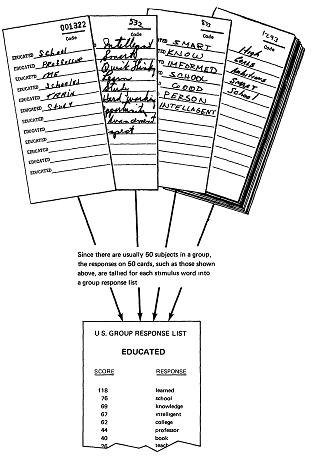
Response cards and group response lists

After collecting data, scores are assigned to responses to indicate the relative importance of that response to the theme's psychological meaning. The weights are assigned to each response according to the proximity of the response to the stimulus word, in a consecutive order of 6, 5, 4, 3, 3, 3, 3, 2, 2, 1, 1......

The group responses contain a rich source of culturally-specific information. The dominant mindset is the group's most salient themes configured with their themes of closest affinity, presented by semantographs.

== Semantograph ==
Differences in meaning of individual themes can be shown by using semantographs. Figure 2 shows how Russian and American managers associate the theme "Freedom". American associations are indicated in blue, and the Russian associations are indicated in red. The vertical axis contains the associated words for the two groups, and the horizontal axis represents the weighted score for each associated word.

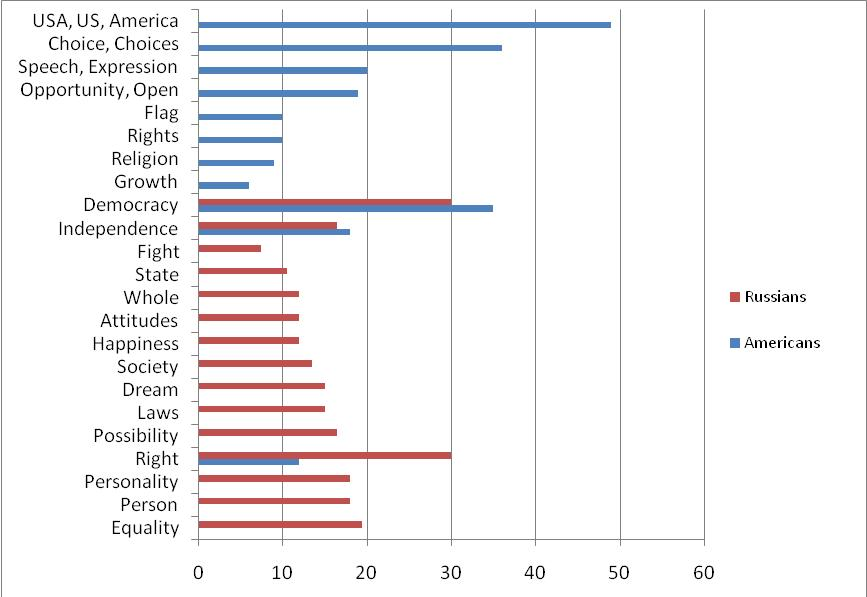
Figure 2. Semantograph of the theme "Freedom"

== Application ==
The characteristics of the AGA method make it well suited for research on cultural/belief change and comparative studies of cultural differences among national groups. Kelly used AGA in a curriculum study. In a curriculum development project called "Justice and the City", to evaluate whether the concept of justice is learnt by students from the curriculum project, 41 themes grouped into four basic domains (Basic Values, Means/End, Analytical Units, and Political-Economic Orientation domains) were given to students. A content analysis of the responses to the stimulus word "justice", revealed that the meaning of justice was substantially changed in the experiment. Students in all urban affairs/public policy classes listed specific kinds of justice (e.g., religious, corporate, natural, liberal, Marxist) and public policy issues in the cards while these responses did not appear in the pretest.

Another AGA study was used in assessing the cultural adaption of Filipinos who had been in the U.S. Navy. Three groups of Filipinos were compared to similarly composed groups of Americans: those who were newly recruited to the U.S. Navy, those who had been in the Navy between 1 and 10 years, and those who had been in the Navy from 11 to 25 years. The results indicated that cultural adaptation occurred most in domains such as "Work" and "Service". Cultural adaptation occurred least in domains such as "Family", "Friends", "Society", "Interpersonal Relations", and "Religion". These domains are most influenced by tradition and early socialization. This study also revealed that cultural adaption is also a function of time spent in the host environment. The change from the first group (new recruits) to the second group (those who had been in the Navy 1–10 years) is faster than the change from the second group to the third group (those who had been in the Navy 11–25 years).

== Limitation ==
1. The method's authors do not offer a measure of significance.
2. This method reveals the power, density, and constraints of a theme, but the interpretation of a word might be context dependent. For example, Russians associated "innovation" with "change", but we don't know the change is interpreted as negative or positive.
