= Martin Guardado =

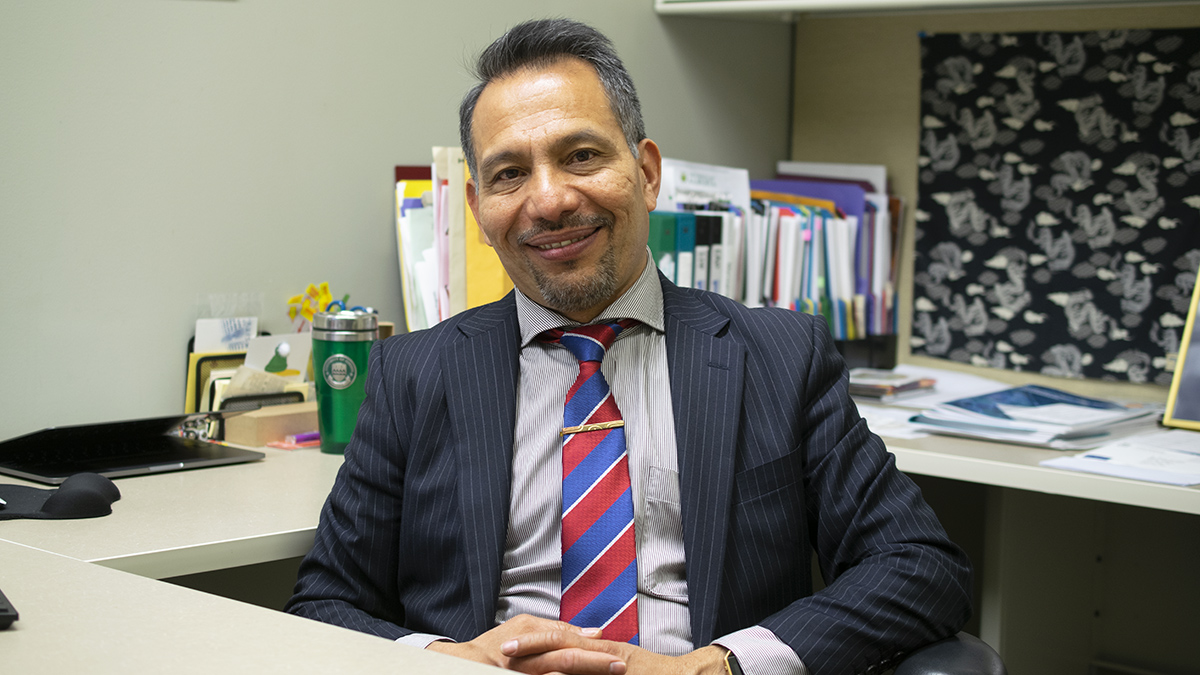
- Born: 1962 (age 63–64); El Salvador
- Known for: Heritage language socialization

Academic background
- Education: University of British Columbia
- Doctoral advisor: Patricia Duff

Academic work
- Discipline: Sociocultural linguistics, Applied linguistics, Sociology of language, Heritage languages
- Institutions: University of Alberta
- Website: University profile

Martin Guardado (born 1962) is a Salvadoran-born Canadian sociocultural linguist and professor of linguistics at the University of Alberta. He is known for his research on heritage language socialization, multilingualism, and language ideologies, contributing to the understanding of how families and communities maintain heritage languages in multilingual societies.

== Education ==
Guardado earned a Master of Education in Teaching English as a Second Language in 2001 and a Doctor of Philosophy in Modern Language Education in 2008, both from the University of British Columbia. His doctoral research focused on the role of language ideologies in heritage language maintenance and shift.

== Academic career ==
Guardado began his academic career at the University of British Columbia, where he taught applied linguistics and teacher education courses from 2001 to 2009. In 2009, he joined the University of Alberta, where he is currently a professor in the Department of Linguistics. He also serves as the associate co-editor for the Canadian Modern Language Review.

== Research ==
Guardado's research examines heritage language socialization, focusing on how language ideologies influence the transmission of heritage languages within families. His early work, including the award-winning paper "Loss and Maintenance of First Language Skills: Case Studies of Hispanic Families in Vancouver," explored the sociocultural dynamics affecting Spanish-speaking families in Canada.

He has since contributed to the study of language ideologies and their role in shaping multilingual identities. His 2018 book Discourse, Ideology, and Heritage Language Socialization proposes a discourse-based framework for researching heritage language development.

More recently, Guardado has undertaken ethnographic research supporting the revitalization of Pipil Náhuat, an endangered Indigenous language of El Salvador, working with communities and elders to document and sustain its use.

He has also commented in the Canadian media on how language influences public perception. In a discussion with CityNews, he explained that PETA's critique of derogatory idioms like “chicken” or “pig” reflects a broader understanding that “language and culture are tightly connected and they are often seen as one and the same.” He also contributed to commentary in The Globe and Mail on how accent perception varies depending on listener identity, underscoring the societal power of language in constructing social categories.

== Selected publications ==
=== Books ===
- Cárcamo, Héctor; Guardado, Martín; Dominguez, Ana; Aquino, Celeste; Ordóñez, Gary & Salgado, Hugo (2023). Achtu taksalis: Aprendiendo Náhuat en el Siglo 21 [Learning Náhuat in the 21st century: First steps]. University of Alberta Libraries, Edmonton: AB. Licensed under CC BY 4.0. ISBN 978-1-55195-505-6
- Romanowski, Piotr & Guardado, Martin (eds.) (2020). The many faces of multilingualism: Language status, learning and use across contexts. De Gruyter Mouton. ISBN 978-1501516108
- Guardado, Martin & Light, Justine (2020). Curriculum development in English for academic purposes: A guide to practice. Palgrave Macmillan. ISBN 978-3030387556
- Guardado, Martin (2018). Discourse, ideology and heritage language socialization: Micro and macro perspectives. De Gruyter Mouton. ISBN 978-1501516030

=== Selected articles ===
- Light, Justine, Lo, Denise, & Guardado, Martin. (2024). Understanding the needs of international EAP students: Adaptive progress. In A. M. Riazi & N. A. Nazari (Eds.), Adaptable English language teaching: Advances and frameworks for responding to new circumstances. Routledge. DOI:10.4324/9781003361701
- Tsushima, Rika, & Guardado, Martin. (2024). Multilingualism and literacy development in interlingual families: Perspectives from Japanese mothers. Journal of Multilingual Theories and Practices, 5(1), 47–68. DOI:10.1558/jmtp.25807
- Guardado, Martin. (2022). La internacionalización de la educación superior y la construcción de la ciudadanía global: Fundamentos, políticas, tendencias y actividades [Internationalizing higher education and fostering global citizenship: Rationales, policies, trends and activities]. Científica, 5(4), 95–116.
