= Situated ethics =

Theory of applied ethics

Situated ethics, often confused with situational ethics, is a view of applied ethics in which abstract standards from a culture or theory are considered to be far less important than the ongoing processes in which one is personally and physically involved, e.g. climate, ecosystem, etc. It is one of several theories of ethics within the philosophy of action.

There are also situated theories of economics, e.g. most green economics, and of knowledge, usually based on some situated ethics. All emphasize the actual physical, geographical, ecological and infrastructural state the actor is in, which determines that actor's actions or range of actions - all deny that there is any one point of view from which to apply standards of or by authority. This makes such theories unpopular with authority, and popular with those who advocate political decentralisation.

== Embodiment ==
Humans pass through Kohlberg/Gilligan's stages of moral development. Up to stage 3 (Conventional morality:Good Interpersonal Relationships), these stages are compatible with embodiment. Most philosophy of law emphasizes that the fact that bodies take risk to enforce laws, make laws embodied at least to the degree they are enforced.

However, the stages become problematic when Lawrence Kohlberg posits a universal ethics - that is, a disembodied ethic. All ethical decisions are necessarily situated in a world. Carol Gilligan's view is closer to an embodied view and emphasizes ethical relationships - necessarily between bodies - over universal ethical principles that require a "God's Eye view". Some ethicists emphasize the role of the ethicist to sort out right versus right in a given context. This is stage 4 but assumes that the ethicist is hesitant to damage relationships or violate principles, e.g. that survival or human rights takes precedence over property rights.

== See also ==
- Situational ethics
