= Miyako Inoue (anthropologist) =

Miyako Inoue (born 1962) is an associate professor in the Department of Cultural and Social Anthropology at Stanford University in Palo Alto, California. She received her PhD from Washington University in St. Louis in 1996. She is a prominent linguistic anthropologist who combines a concerted focus on social theory with a rigorous analysis of language in social life. Inoue teaches linguistic anthropology and the anthropology of Japan.

== Bibliography ==
Her recent book Vicarious Language: the Political Economy of Gender and Speech in Japan (University of California Press), examines a phenomenon commonly called "women's language" in Japanese society, and offers a genealogy showing its critical linkage with Japan's national and capitalist modernity.

Inoue's recent articles include "The Listening Subject of Japanese Modernity and His Auditory Double: Citing, Sighting, and Siting the Modern Japanese Woman" (2003), and "What does Language Remember?: Indexical Order and the Naturalized History of Japanese Women" (2003).

== See also ==
- Anthropology
- Linguistic Anthropology
