= Elinor Ochs =

American linguistic anthropologist

Elinor Ochs is an American linguistic anthropologist, and Distinguished Professor of Anthropology at University of California, Los Angeles. Ochs has conducted fieldwork in Madagascar, Italy, Samoa and the United States of America on communication and interaction. Together with Bambi Schieffelin, Professor Ochs developed language socialization, a field of inquiry which examines the ways in which individuals become competent members of communities of practice to and through the use of language. Professor Ochs is also known for her contributions to applied linguistics and the theorization of narrative and family discourse.

In the US, Professor Ochs has conducted research on a wide range of topics including the social construction of knowledge in a physics laboratory, sociality and autism, and the socialization of morality in family discourse. The last was conducted during her decade long tenure as the director for the Center on Everyday Lives of Families, supported by the Alfred P. Sloan Foundation's Workplace, Workforce, and Working Families Program on Dual-Career Working Middle Class Families. In 1998, Professor Ochs was named a MacArthur Fellow for her contributions to the study of language.

== Awards ==
- 2000 Honorary Doctorate, Linkoping University, Sweden
- 1998 MacArthur Fellows Program
- 1998 American Academy of Arts and Sciences Fellow
- 1996 Helsinki University Rector's Medal of Distinctive Scholarship
- 1984 John Simon Guggenheim Memorial Foundation Fellow
- 1973 New Hall, University of Cambridge Fellow
- 1973 Honorary master's degree, University of Cambridge
- 1966 Phi Beta Kappa

== Works ==
- The Handbook of Language Socialization, Editors, Alessandro Duranti, Elinor Ochs, Bambi B. Schieffelin, Malden, MA:Wiley-Blackwell, 2011. ISBN 978-1-4051-9186-9
- Living narrative: creating lives in everyday storytelling, Authors Elinor Ochs, Lisa Capps, Harvard University Press, 2001, ISBN 978-0-674-00482-5
- Constructing panic: the discourse of agoraphobia, Authors Lisa Capps, Elinor Ochs, Harvard University Press, 1997, ISBN 978-0-674-16549-6
- Interaction and grammar, Editors Elinor Ochs, Emanuel A. Schegloff, Sandra A. Thompson, Cambridge University Press, 1996, ISBN 978-0-521-55828-0
- Culture and language development: Language acquisition and language socialization in a Samoan village, Elinor Ochs, Cambridge: Cambridge University Press. ISBN 9780521348942
- Language socialization across cultures, Editors Bambi B. Schieffelin, Elinor Ochs, Cambridge University Press, 1986, ISBN 978-0-521-33919-3
- Acquisition of conversational competence, Authors Elinor Ochs, Bambi B. Schieffelin, London: Routledge, 1983, Kegan and Paul ISBN 0710094590
- Developmental pragmatics, Editors Elinor Ochs, Bambi Schieffelin, New York: Academic Press, 1979. ISBN 978-0125245500
