= Paul V. Kroskrity =

American linguistic anthropologist

- Born: February 10, 1949 (age 77); Brooklyn, New York, U.S.
- Education: Indiana University Bloomington; Columbia University
- Scientific career
- Fields: Anthropology
- Workplaces: University of California, Los Angeles
- Doctoral advisor: Charles F. Voegelin

Paul V. Kroskrity (/ˈkrɒskrɪti/; born February 10, 1949) is an American linguistic anthropologist known primarily for his contributions to establishing and developing language ideology as a field of research. He is professor of anthropology, applied linguistics, and American Indian Studies at the University of California, Los Angeles. He is the past President of the Society for Linguistic Anthropology and past Chair of the American Indian Studies program at the University of California, Los Angeles.

Kroskrity's research focuses on language ideologies, language and identity, verbal art and performance, language contact, and language endangerment and revitalization. He specializes in the indigenous languages of the Kiowa-Tanoan and Uto-Aztecan language families, and has worked in the Western Pueblo region and Central California.

== Biography ==
Paul V. Kroskrity grew up in Brooklyn. He received his bachelor's degree from Columbia College, Columbia University where he studied Oriental Studies, Comparative Literature, and Comparative Religion. For graduate school he moved to Indiana University and was the last student of linguist Carl Voegelin. He also worked with Allen D. Grimshaw, Charles S. Bird, and Raymond J. DeMallie. Voegelin inspired his interest in American Indian languages and suggested that he conduct research with the Arizona Tewa.

Kroskrity earned his PhD from Indiana University Bloomington in anthropology in 1977 with a dissertation titled "Aspects of Arizona Tewa Language Structure and Language Use". In 1978 Kroskrity was hired as a professor of anthropology at the University of California, Los Angeles, where he has been teaching ever since.

== Research ==
Among Kroskrity's contributions to linguistic anthropological research and theory, he is best known for helping to develop and establish the research field of language ideology. In the early 1990s a group of linguists and anthropologists, working on the relationship of cultural conceptions of language to linguistic structure, language use, and social context, convened on several occasions to bring scholarly attention to what soon became known in the discipline as "language ideology". Kroskrity organized and co-organized sessions at meetings of the American Anthropological Association (1991, 1994) and at the School of American Research in Santa Fe (1994), and served as the editor and co-editor of three of the resulting volumes.

=== Arizona Tewa language ideologies ===
Kroskrity's interest in the ideological dimension of language use and their relationship to linguistic structure, cultural identity, and ethnohistory can be traced to the beginning of his career. When he started his dissertation research in the Arizona Tewa communities on the First Mesa Hopi Reservation (Northeastern Arizona) in 1973, Kroskrity was primarily interested in Tewa grammar and language contact, but the Tewa themselves kept reminding him of the importance of the link between language, culture, and religious ceremonies. "My language is my life" is a popular saying in Tewa, which suggests a strong link between language and identity. Language and identity became a central theme in Kroskrity's later work, interpreting Tewa cultural phenomena in the light of the emerging theory of language ideology.

His early research concentrated on linguistic variation, language contact, linguistic borrowing, and areal influences in Tewa. The Tewa language presents unique data for the study of language contact because despite a history of about 300 years of contact with their Hopi neighbors and widespread multilingualism, the Arizona Tewa have adopted almost no loanwords from Hopi. This is a common pattern in many Pueblo cultures, usually known as "linguistic conservatism".

Kroskrity re-analyzed this pattern as an indigenous ideology of Linguistic purism. But rather than being a result of the rejection of foreign elements by the Tewa community, Kroskrity traces this ideology to the prominence of kiva speech, a type of ceremonial speech confined in its use to religious authorities. Associated with the highly valued religious domain, kiva speech embodies four cultural preferences: regulation by convention, indigenous purism, strict compartmentalization, and linguistic indexing of identity. These preferences are reflected in Arizona Tewa linguistic ideologies concerning non-kiva language as well, and turn kiva speech thus into a folk model for language in general. Kroskrity has coined the term "dominant language ideology" to describe these underlying conceptions of language, where linguistic and cultural forms specific to one domain come to serve as a model for other forms.

In relation to research on the relative metalinguistic awareness that speakers have of their language, Kroskrity points out that this dominant ideology is most influential on the Tewa lexicon, since lexical differences are most accessible to awareness and therefore most easily controlled by the speakers.

=== Western Mono language ideologies ===
In addition to research with the Arizona Tewa, Kroskrity has also worked with the Western Mono communities of central California since 1980. In stark contrast to the Arizona Tewa, linguistic purism was absent in the Western Mono communities. Kroskrity identifies three precolonial language ideologies: syncretism, the valorization of linguistic borrowings and hybridity; variationism, that dialectal variation is seen as the natural outcome of family and individual differences; and utilitarianism, the idea of language as tool or technology. These ideologies have most likely contributed to language shift toward English. In precolonial times among indigenous groups on the Pacific coast of the present-day United States, lexical borrowings between different languages were common and not perceived as dangerous to the vitality of any language, let alone ethnic identity. In this context, the adoption of English items into the lexicon of Western Mono was welcomed rather than condemned, partly because the Western Mono language was never indexical or iconic of a unified ethnic identity, owing to internal differentiation; and partly because in colonial and post-colonial society, English was becoming increasingly useful. These traditional language ideologies alongside educational politics proved to be detrimental to language maintenance.

=== Language ideological clarification ===
Kroskrity's work demonstrates the importance of language ideologies for understanding language maintenance and shift. While in the case of the Arizona Tewa, a dominant language ideology of purism and an association of the Tewa language with ethnic identity has contributed to language maintenance, the traditional language ideologies of the Western Mono have contributed to rapid language shift. In light of these findings, Kroskrity has more recently called for "language ideological clarification".

Language ideological clarification is the process of identifying issues of language ideological contestation within a heritage language community, including both beliefs and feelings that are indigenous to that community and those introduced by outsiders (such as linguists and government officials), that can negatively impact community efforts to successfully engage in language maintenance and renewal. This process of identifying and raising consciousness about linguistic and discursive issues enables appropriate discourses to occur between community members, or between members and either linguists or government officials who have differing opinions. Ideally these discourses would promote actual resolution—a clarification achieved—or foster a tolerable level of disagreement that would not inhibit language renewal activities.

=== Collaborative fieldwork ===
Throughout his career Kroskrity has contributed through research to the agendas of the communities he studies. He conducted "collaborative research" with Tewa and Western Mono informants long before the term became fashionable in anthropology. In 2002 he collaborated with Rosalie Bethel (Western Mono) to publish an interactive CD-ROM, contributing to Western Mono language revitalization activities.

== Selected publications ==
- Kroskrity, Paul V. (ed.). 2012. Telling Stories in the Face of Danger: Language Renewal in Native American Communities. Norman, Oklahoma: University of Oklahoma Press.
- Kroskrity, Paul V. and Margaret Field (eds.). 2009. Native American Language Ideologies: Beliefs, Practices, and Struggles in Indian Country. Tucson: University of Arizona Press.
- Kroskrity, Paul V., Rosalie Bethel, and Jennifer F. Reynolds. 2002. Taitaduhaan: Western Mono Ways of Speaking (CD-ROM). Norman, OK: University of Oklahoma Press.
- Kroskrity, Paul V. (ed.). 2000. Regimes of Language: Ideologies, Polities, and Identities. Santa Fe, NM: School of American Research.
- Schieffelin, Bambi, Kathryn Woolard, and Paul V. Kroskrity (eds.). 1998. Language Ideologies, Theory and Practice. New York: Oxford University Press.
- Kroskrity, Paul V. 1993. Language, History, and Identity: Ethnolinguistic Studies of the Arizona Tewa. Tucson: University of Arizona Press.
- Bethel, Rosalie, Paul V. Kroskrity, Christopher Loether, and Gregory A. Reinhardt. 1984. A Practical Dictionary of Western Mono. North Fork, California: Sierra Mono Museum. (2nd edition: 1993).
