= Language ideology =

Concept of language having or being influenced by ideology

Language ideology (also known as linguistic ideology) is, within anthropology (especially linguistic anthropology), sociolinguistics, and cross-cultural studies, any set of beliefs about languages as they are used in their social worlds. Language ideologies are conceptualizations about languages, speakers, and discursive practices. Like other kinds of ideologies, language ideologies are influenced by political and moral interests, and they are shaped in a cultural setting. When recognized and explored, language ideologies expose how the speakers' linguistic beliefs are linked to the broader social and cultural systems to which they belong, illustrating how the systems beget such beliefs. By doing so, language ideologies link implicit and explicit assumptions about a language or language in general to their social experience as well as their political and economic interests.

== Applications and approaches ==
=== Definitions ===
Scholars have noted difficulty in attempting to delimit the scope, meaning, and applications of language ideology. Paul Kroskrity, a linguistic anthropologist, describes language ideology as a "cluster concept, consisting of a number of converging dimensions" with several "partially overlapping but analytically distinguishable layers of significance", and cites that in the existing scholarship on language ideology "there is no particular unity . . . no core literature, and a range of definitions." One of the broadest definitions is offered by Alan Rumsey, who describes language ideologies as "shared bodies of commonsense notions about the nature of language in the world." This definition is seen by Kroskrity as unsatisfactory, however, because "it fails to problematize language ideological variation and therefore promotes an overly homogeneous view of language ideologies within a cultural group." Emphasizing the role of speakers' awareness in influencing language structure, Michael Silverstein defines linguistic ideologies as "sets of beliefs about language articulated by users as a rationalization or justification of perceived language structure and use." Definitions that place greater emphasis on sociocultural factors include Shirley Heath's characterization of language ideologies as "self-evident ideas and objectives a group holds concerning roles of language in the social experiences of members as they contribute to the expression of the group", as well as Judith Irvine's definition of the concept as "the cultural system of ideas about social and linguistic relationships, together with their loading of moral and political interests."

=== Critical vs. neutral approaches ===
The basic division in studies of language ideology is between neutral and critical approaches to ideology. In neutral approaches to language ideology, beliefs or ideas about a language are understood to be shaped by the cultural systems in which it is embedded, but no variation within or across these systems is identified. Often, a single ideology will be identified in such cases. Characterizations of language ideology as representative of one community or culture, such as those routinely documented in ethnographic research, are common examples of neutral approaches to language ideology.

Critical approaches to language ideology explore the capacity for language and linguistic ideologies to be used as strategies for maintaining social power and domination. They are described by Kathryn Woolard and Bambi Schieffelin as studies of "some aspects of representation and social cognition, with particular social origins or functional and formal characteristics." Although such studies are often noted for their discussions of language politics and the intersection between language and social class, the crucial difference between these approaches to language ideology and neutral understandings of the concept is that the former emphasize the existence of variability and contradiction both within and amongst ideologies, while the latter approach ideology as a conception on its own terms.

== Areas of inquiry ==
=== Language use and structure ===
Many scholars have argued that ideology plays a role in shaping and influencing linguistic structures and speech forms. Michael Silverstein, for example, sees speakers' awareness of language and their rationalizations of its structure and use as critical factors that often shape the evolution of a language's structure. According to Silverstein, the ideologies speakers possess regarding language mediate the variation that occurs due to their imperfect and limited awareness of linguistic structures, resulting in the regularization of any variation that is rationalized by any sufficiently dominant or culturally widespread ideologies. This is demonstrated by such linguistic changes as the rejection of "he" as the generic pronoun in English, which coincided with the rise of the feminist movement in the second half of the twentieth century. In this instance, the accepted usage of the masculine pronoun as the generic form came to be understood as a linguistic symbol of patriarchal and male-dominated society, and the growing sentiment opposing these conditions motivated some speakers to stop using "he" as the generic pronoun in favor of the construction "he or she." This rejection of generic "he" was rationalized by the growing desire for gender equality and women's empowerment, which was sufficiently culturally prevalent to regularize the change.

Alan Rumsey also sees linguistic ideologies as playing a role in shaping the structure of a language, describing a circular process of reciprocal influence where a language's structure conditions the ideologies that affect it, which in turn reinforce and expand this structure, altering the language "in the name of making it more like itself." This process is exemplified by the excessive glottalization of consonants by bilingual speakers of moribund varieties of Xinca, who effectively altered the structure of this language in order to make it more distinct from Spanish. These speakers glottalized consonants in situations in places more competent speakers of Xinca would not because they were less familiar with the phonological rules of the language and also because they wished to distinguish themselves from the socially-dominant Spanish-speakers, who viewed glottalized consonants as "exotic."

=== Ethnography of speaking ===
Studies of "ways of speaking" within specific communities have been recognized as especially productive sites of research in language ideology. They often include a community's own theory of speech as a part of their ethnography, which allows for the documentation of explicit language ideologies on a community-wide level or in "the neutral sense of cultural conceptions." A study of language socialization practices in Dominica, for example, revealed that local notions of personhood, status, and authority are associated with the strategic usage of Patwa and English in the course of the adult-child interaction. The use of Patwa by children is largely forbidden by adults due to a perception that it inhibits the acquisition of English, thus restricting social mobility, which in turn has imbued Patwa with a significant measure of covert prestige and rendered it a powerful tool for children to utilize in order to defy authority. Thus there are many competing ideologies of Patwa in Dominica: one which encourages a shift away from Patwa usage and another which contributes to its maintenance.

==== Linguistic ideologies in speech act theory ====
J. L. Austin and John Searle's speech act theory has been described by several ethnographers, anthropologists, and linguists as being based in a specifically Western linguistic ideology that renders it inapplicable in certain ethnographic contexts. Jef Verschueren characterized speech act theory as privileging "a privatized view of language that emphasizes the psychological state of the speaker while downplaying the social consequences of speech," while Michael Silverstein argued that the theory's ideas about language "acts" and "forces" are "projections of covert categories typical in the metapragmatic discourse of languages such as English." Scholars have subsequently used speech act theory to caution against the positioning of linguistic theories as universally applicable, citing that any account of language will reflect the linguistic ideologies held by those who develop it.

=== Language contact and multilingualism ===
Several scholars have noted that sites of cultural contact promote the development of new linguistic forms that draw on diverse language varieties and ideologies at an accelerated rate. According to Miki Makihara and Bambi Schieffelin, it becomes necessary during times of cultural contact for speakers to actively negotiate language ideologies and to consciously reflect on language use. This articulation of ideology is essential to prevent misconceptions of meaning and intentions between cultures, and provides a link between sociocultural and linguistic processes in contact situations.

=== Language policy and standardization ===
The establishment of a standard language has many implications in the realms of politics and power. Recent examinations of language ideologies have resulted in the conception of "standard" as a matter of ideology rather than fact, raising questions such as "how doctrines of linguistic correctness and incorrectness are rationalized and how they are related to doctrines of the inherent representational power, beauty, and expressiveness of language as a valued mode of action.".

==== Language policy ====
Governmental policies often reflect the tension between two contrasting types of language ideologies: ideologies that conceive of language as a resource, problem, or right and ideologies that conceive of language as pluralistic phenomena. The linguistic policies that emerge in such instances often reflect a compromise between both types of ideologies. According to Blommaert and Verschueren, this compromise is often reinterpreted as a single, unified ideology, evidenced by the many European societies characterized by a language ideological homogenism.

==== Ideologies of linguistic purism ====
Purist language ideologies or ideologies of linguistic conservatism can close off languages to nonnative sources of innovation, usually when such sources are perceived as socially or politically threatening to the target language. Among the Tewa, for example, the influence of theocratic institutions and ritualized linguistic forms in other domains of Tewa society have led to a strong resistance to the extensive borrowing and shift that neighboring speech communities have experienced. According to Paul Kroskrity this is due to a "dominant language ideology" through which ceremonial Kiva speech is elevated to a linguistic ideal and the cultural preferences that it embodies, namely regulation by convention, indigenous purism, strict compartmentalization, and linguistic indexing of identity, are recursively projected onto the Tewa language as a whole.

Alexandra Jaffe points out that language purism is often part of "essentializing discourses" that can lead to stigmatizing habitual language practices like code-switching and depict contact-induced linguistic changes as forms of cultural deficiency.

==== Standard language ideology ====
As defined by Rosina Lippi-Green, standard language ideology is "a bias toward an abstract, idealized homogeneous language, which is imposed and maintained by dominant institutions and which has as its model the written language, but which is drawn primarily from the spoken language of the upper middle class." According to Lippi-Green, part of this ideology is a belief that standard languages are internally consistent. Linguists generally agree, however, that variation is intrinsic to all spoken language, including standard varieties.

Standard language ideology is strongly connected with the concepts of linguistic purism and prescriptivism. It is also linked with linguicism (linguistic discrimination).

=== Literacy ===
Literacy cannot be strictly defined technically, but rather it is a set of practices determined by a community's language ideology. It can be interpreted in many ways that are determined by political, social, and economic forces. According to Kathryn Woolard and Bambi Schieffelin, literacy traditions are closely linked to social control in most societies. The typical European literacy ideology, for example, recognizes literacy solely in an alphabetic capacity.

==== Kaluli literacy development ====
In the 1960s, missionaries arrived in Papua New Guinea and exposed the Kaluli to Christianity and modernization, part of which was accomplished through the introduction of literacy. The Kaluli primers that were introduced by the missionaries promoted Westernization, which effectively served to strip the vernacular language of cultural practices and from discourse in church and school. Readers written in the 1970s used derogatory terms to refer to the Kaluli and depicted their practices as inferior, motivating the Kaluli to change their self-perceptions and orient themselves towards Western values. The missionaries' control of these authoritative books and of this new "technology of language literacy" gave them the power to effect culture change and morph the ideology of Kaluli into that of modern Christianity.

=== Orthography ===
Orthographic systems always carry historical, cultural, and political meaning that are grounded in ideology. Orthographic debates are focused on political and social issues rather than on linguistic discrepancies, which can make for intense debates characterized by ideologically charged stances and symbolically important decisions.

=== Classroom practice/second language acquisition ===
"Language ideologies are not confined merely to ideas or beliefs, but rather is extended to include the very language practices through which our ideas or notions are enacted" (Razfar, 2005). Teachers display their language ideologies in classroom instruction through various practices such as correction or repair, affective alignment, metadiscourse, and narrative (see Razfar & Rumenapp, 2013, p. 289). The study of ideology seeks to uncover the hidden world of students and teachers to shed light on the fundamental forces that shape and give meaning to their actions and interactions.

== See also ==
- Colonialingualism
- English-only movement
- Finvenkismo
- Ideology
- Language planning
- Language policy
- Language politics
- Language revitalization
- Revival of the Hebrew language
- Linguistic anthropology
- Linguistic profiling
- Linguistic purism
- Linguistic rights
- Metapragmatics
- Prestige (sociolinguistics)
- Raciolinguistics
- Sociolinguistics
- Standard language
- Perceptual dialectology
