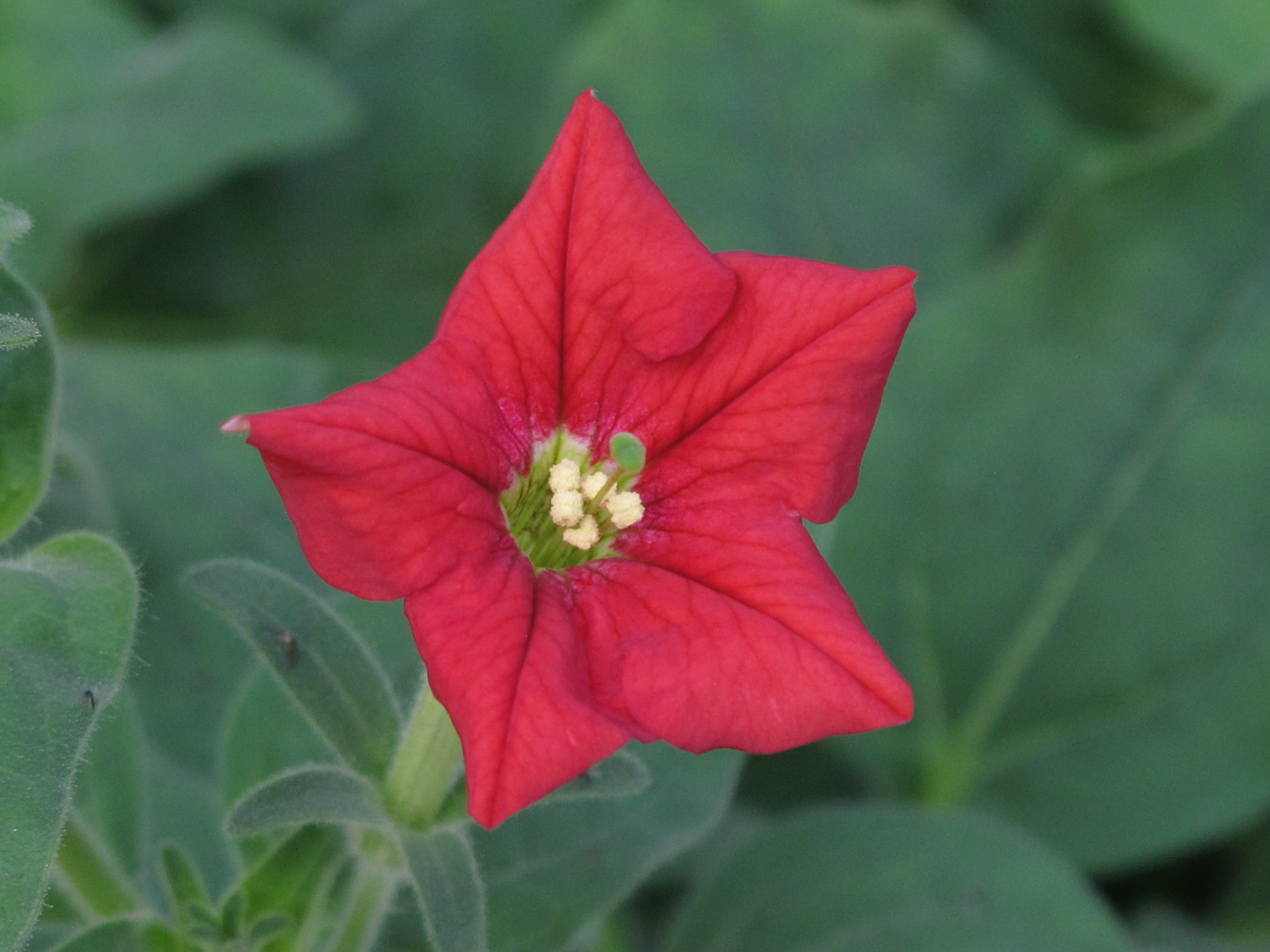

Scientific classification
- Kingdom: Plantae
- Clade: Tracheophytes
- Clade: Angiosperms
- Clade: Eudicots
- Clade: Asterids
- Order: Solanales
- Family: Solanaceae
- Genus: Petunia
- Species: P. exserta

Binomial name
- Petunia exserta Stehm.

= Petunia exserta =

Species of flowering plant

Petunia exserta is a rare member of the genus Petunia, endemic to the Serras de Sudeste in southern Brazil. First described in 1987, only fourteen plants were found in the wild during an expedition in 2007. In the wild, the plant is found growing only in shaded cracks on sandstone towers. It is the only Petunia species that is naturally pollinated by hummingbirds, and the only naturally red flowered Petunia species.

== Description ==
Petunia exserta has a bright red corolla with distinctive exserted stamens and stigma, the latter which are typically associated with hummingbird pollination. It shares the erect habit, and similar corolla, pollen, and stalk attributes of Petunia axillaris and Petunia secreta. The flowers have no fragrance, which is not necessary for attracting hummingbirds, who have little sense of smell. The red color is due to several anthocyanin pigments, which are different from the cause of red color in modern hybrid petunias.

== Threats ==
In addition to its very limited range, P. exserta is also threatened because it so easily hybridizes with other Petunia species in its native range, especially with Petunia axillaris, thus producing offspring that are hybrids rather than the species. The plant is increasingly being sold in horticulture, so the threat to its survival is only in its native habitat.
