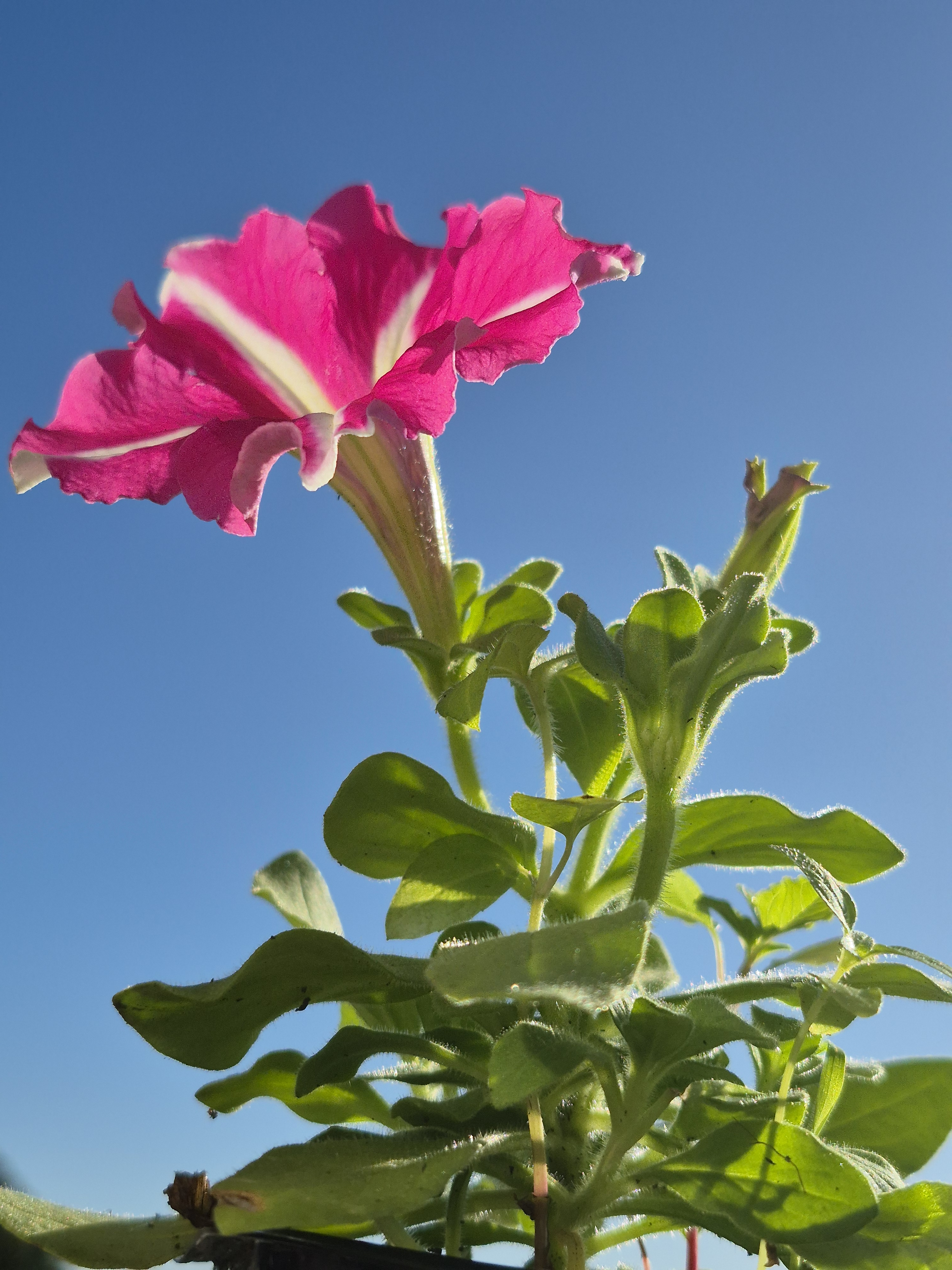
- Petunia sp. flower

Scientific classification
- Kingdom: Plantae
- Clade: Tracheophytes
- Clade: Angiosperms
- Clade: Eudicots
- Clade: Asterids
- Order: Solanales
- Family: Solanaceae
- Subfamily: Petunioideae
- Genus: Petunia; Juss.

Species
- See text

= Petunia =

Genus of flowering plants

Petunia is a genus of 20 species of flowering plants of South American origin. The popular flower of the same name derived its epithet from the French, which took the word pétun, 'tobacco', from a Tupi–Guarani language. A tender perennial plant, most of the varieties seen in gardens are hybrids (Petunia × atkinsiana, also known as Petunia × hybrida).

== Taxonomy ==
Petunia is a genus in the family Solanaceae, subfamily Petunioideae. Well known members of Solanaceae in other subfamilies include tobacco (subfamily Nicotianoideae), and the cape gooseberry, tomato, potato, deadly nightshade and peppers (subfamily Solanoideae). Some botanists place the plants of the genus Calibrachoa in the genus Petunia, but this is not accepted by others. Petchoa is a hybrid genus derived from crossing Calibrachoa and Petunia.

== Species ==
Species include:

- Petunia alpicola
- Petunia axillaris
- Petunia bajeensis
- Petunia bonjardinensis
- Petunia exserta
- Petunia guarapuavensis
- Petunia inflata
- Petunia integrifolia
- Petunia interior
- Petunia ledifolia
- Petunia littoralis
- Petunia mantiqueirensis
- Petunia occidentalis
- Petunia patagonica
- Petunia reitzii
- Petunia riograndensis
- Petunia saxicola
- Petunia scheideana
- Petunia villadiana
- Petunia × atkinsiana

== Ecology ==
Petunias are generally insect pollinated, with the exception of P. exserta, which is a rare, red-flowered, hummingbird-pollinated species. Most petunias are diploid with 14 chromosomes and are interfertile with other petunia species, as well as with Calibrachoa.

The tubular flowers are favoured by some Lepidoptera species, including the Hummingbird hawk moth.

== Cultivation ==
Petunias can tolerate relatively harsh conditions and hot climates, but not frost. They need at least five hours of sunlight every day and flourish in moist soil and conditions of low atmospheric humidity. They are best grown from seed. Watering once a week should be sufficient in most regions. Hanging baskets and other containers need more frequent watering. Maximum growth occurs in late spring. Applying fertilizer monthly or weekly, depending on the variety, will help the plant grow quickly.

=== AGM cultivars ===
The following is a selection of cultivars which have received the Royal Horticultural Society's Award of Garden Merit:

- Conchita Blueberry Frost = 'Conblue'
- Conchita Evening Glow = 'Conglow'
- Conchita Strawberry Frost = 'Constraw'
- NightSky = 'Kleph15313'
- 'Storm Lavender'
- 'Storm Pink'
- 'Storm Salmon'
- Surfinia Pink Vein = 'Suntosol'
- Surfinia Purple = 'Sunpurple'
- Tumbelina Priscilla = 'Kerpril'

== Uses ==
Many species other than Petunia × atkinsiana are also gaining popularity in the home garden. A wide range of flower colours, sizes, and plant architectures are available in both Petunia × atkinsiana and other species.

Genetically engineered bioluminescent Petunia hybrida was approved for sales by USDA in 2023. Called 'Firefly', this white-flowered petunia glows due to inserted genes from a bioluminescent mushroom.

== Symbolism and folklore ==
The Maya and Inca believed that the scent of petunias had the power to ward off underworld monsters and spirits. Their flower-buds were bunched together for magical drinks.

== Gallery ==
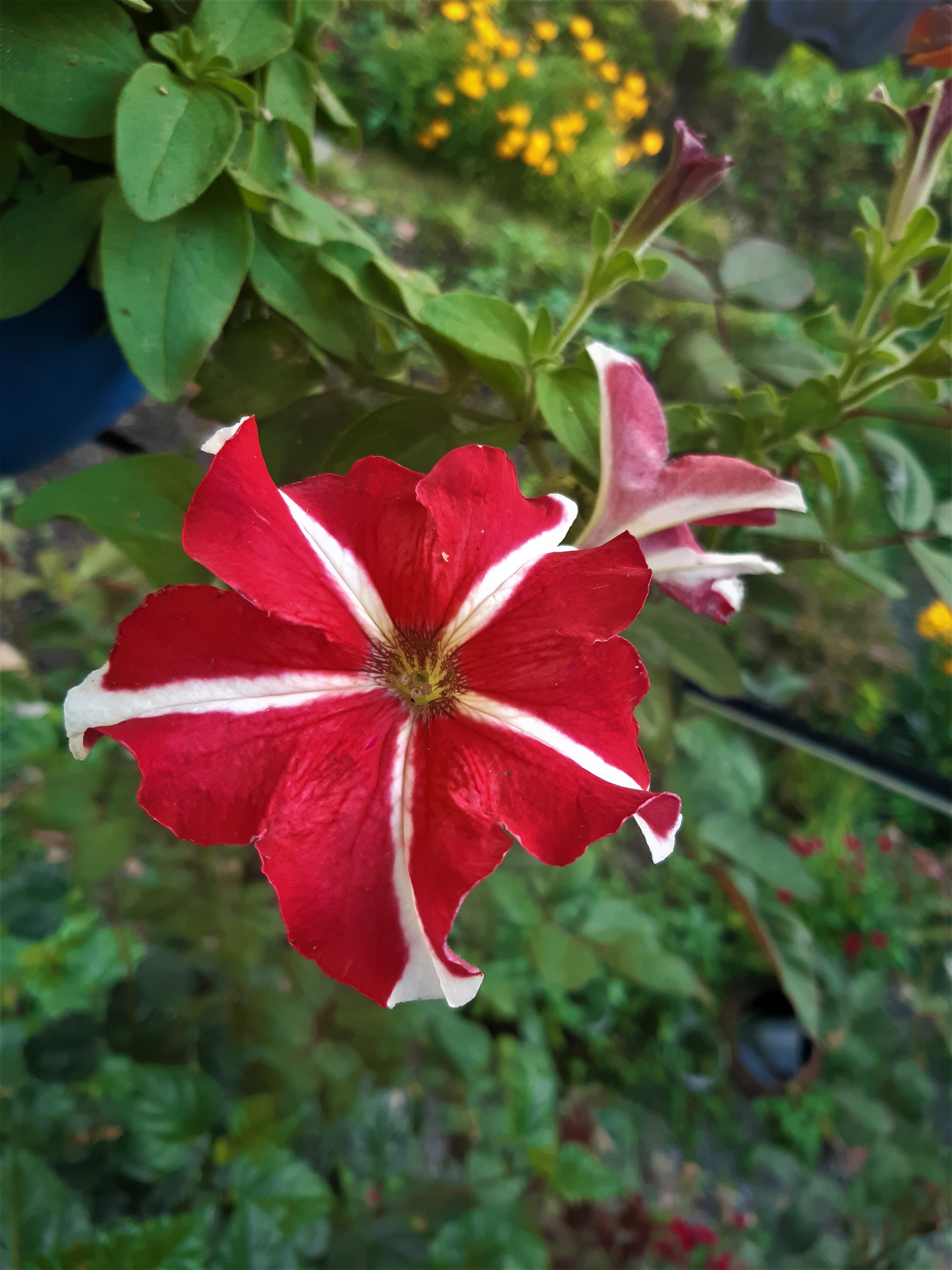
Red and white mixed petunia

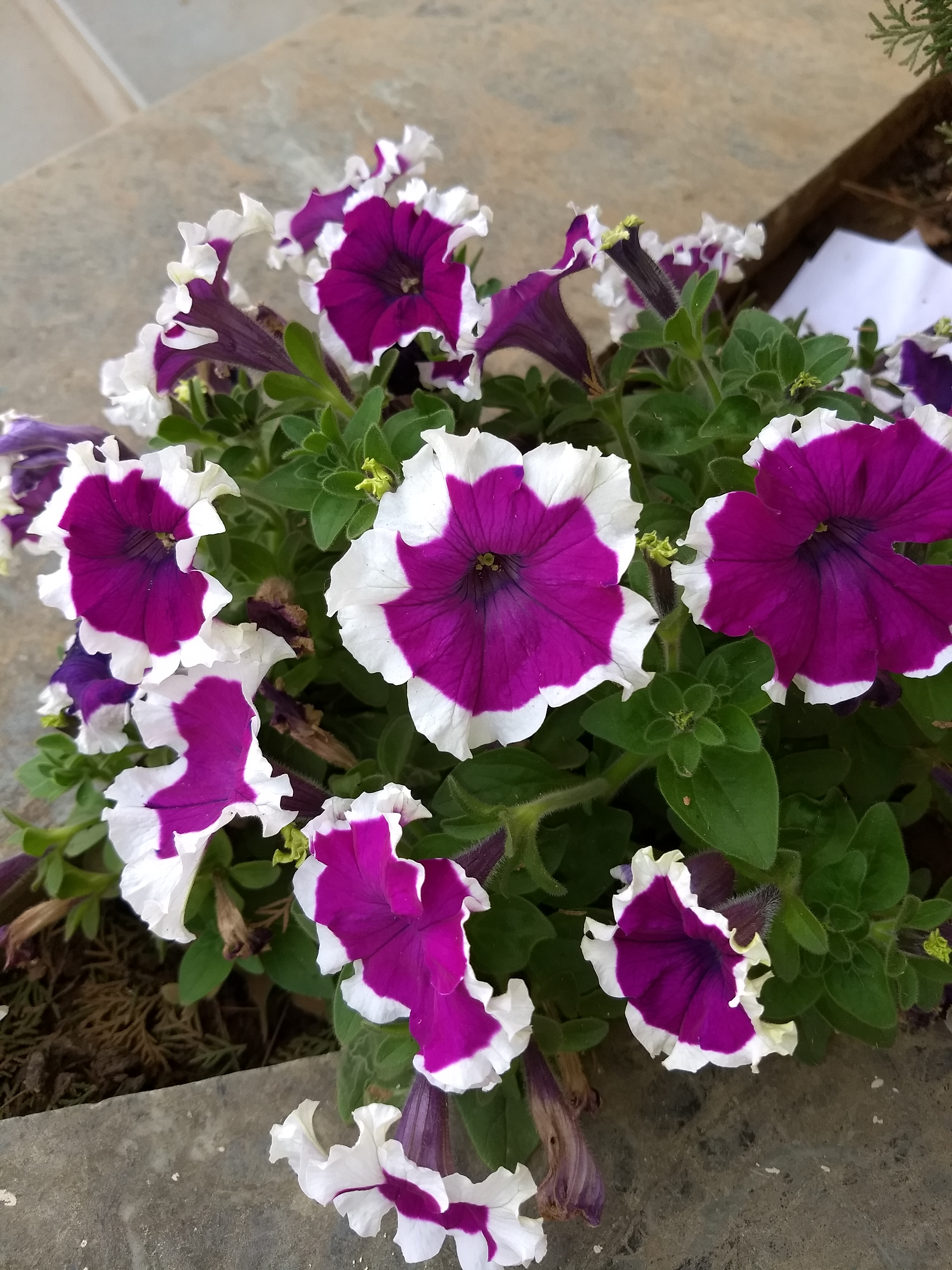
Purple petunias with a white border

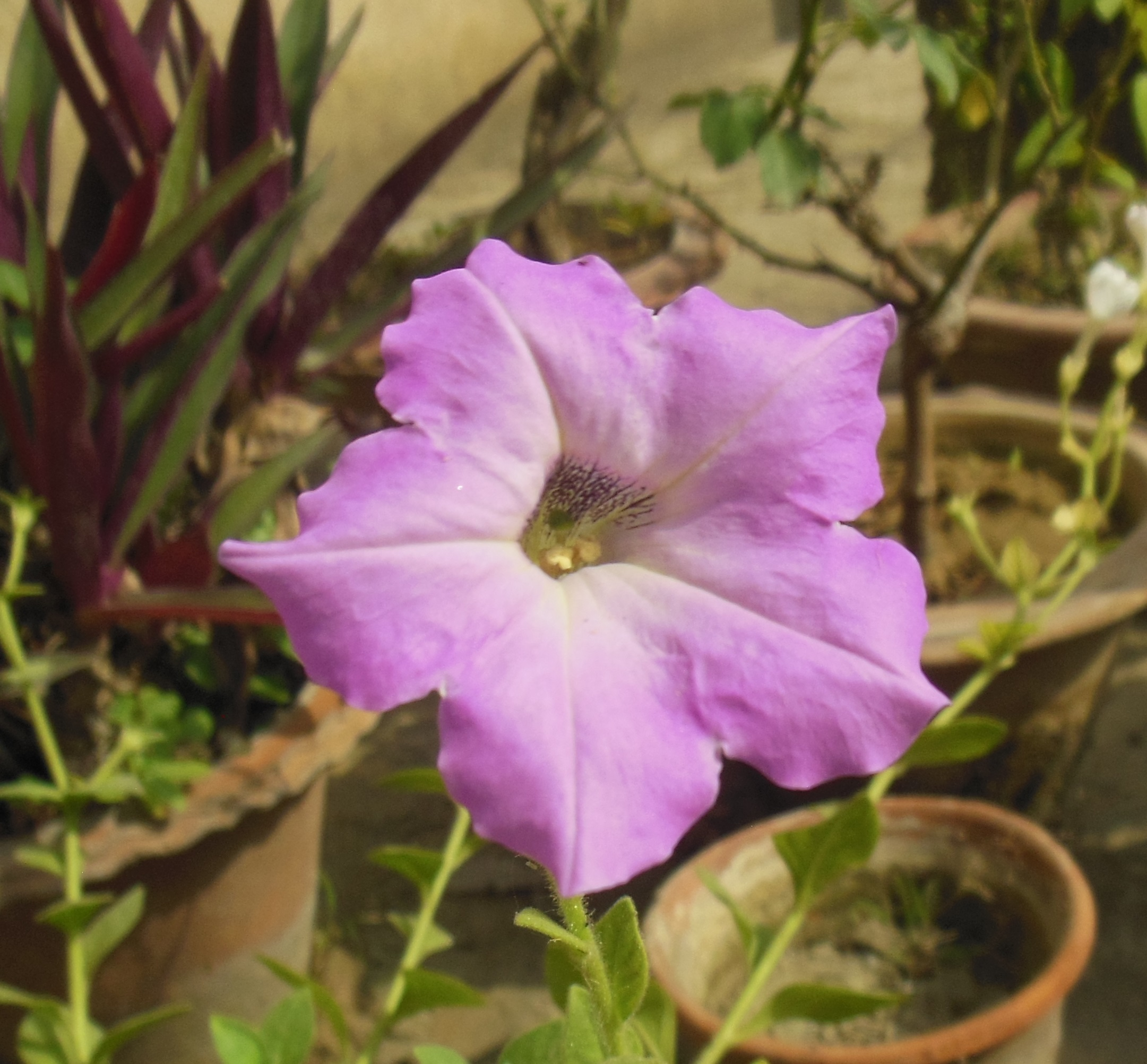
A form of Petunia axillaris with a light pink flower

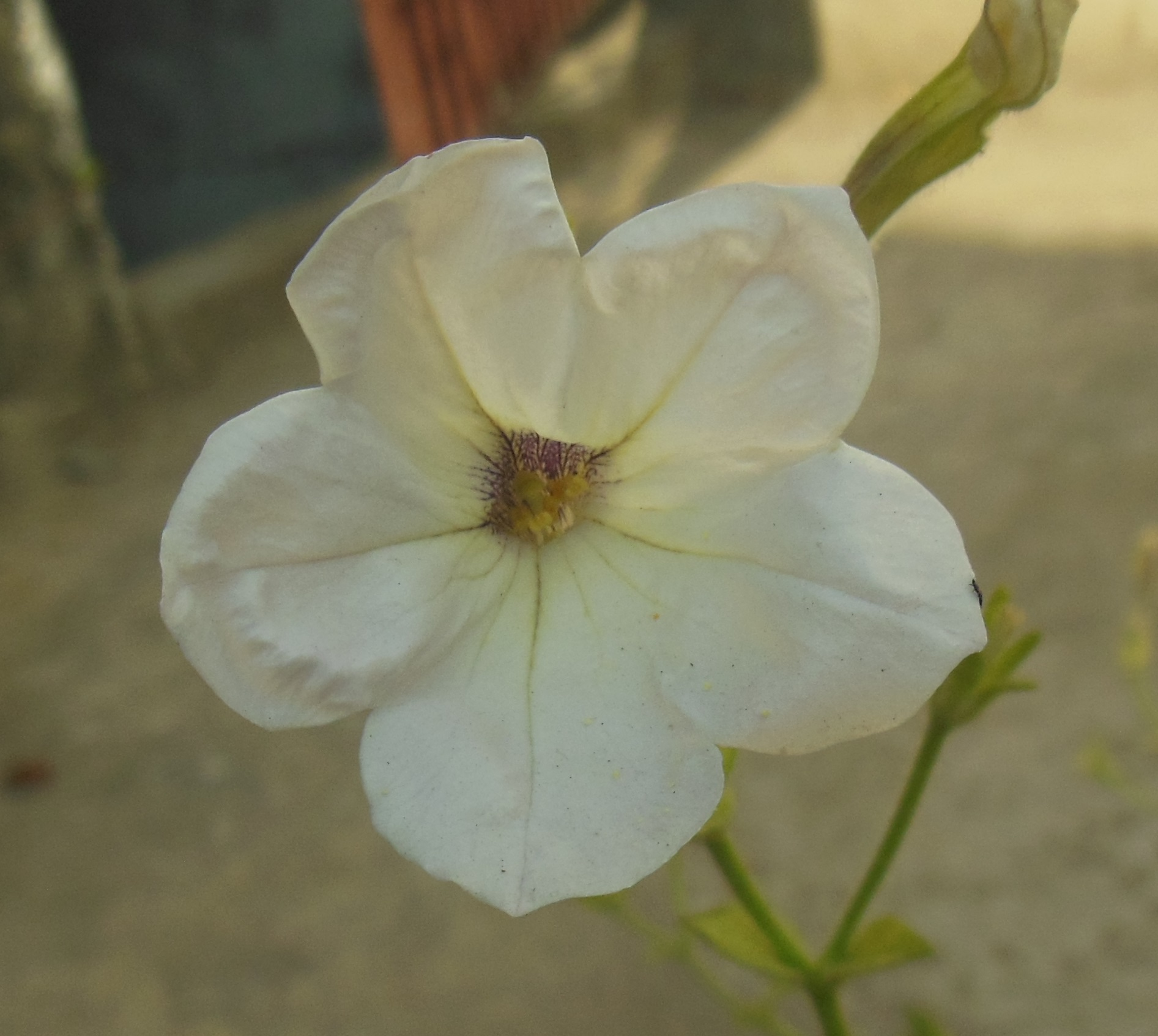
White Petunia axillaris

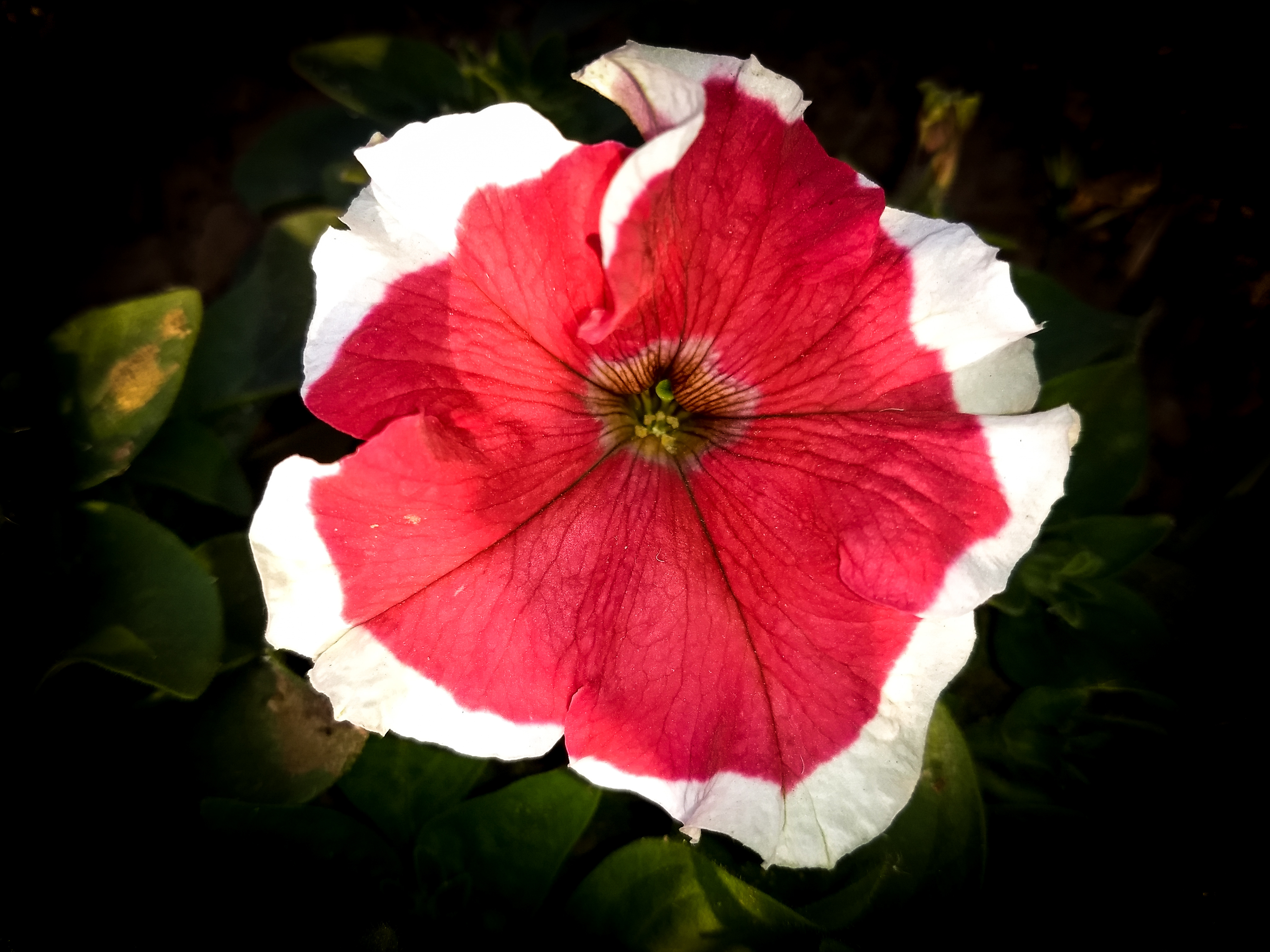
A red petunia with a white border

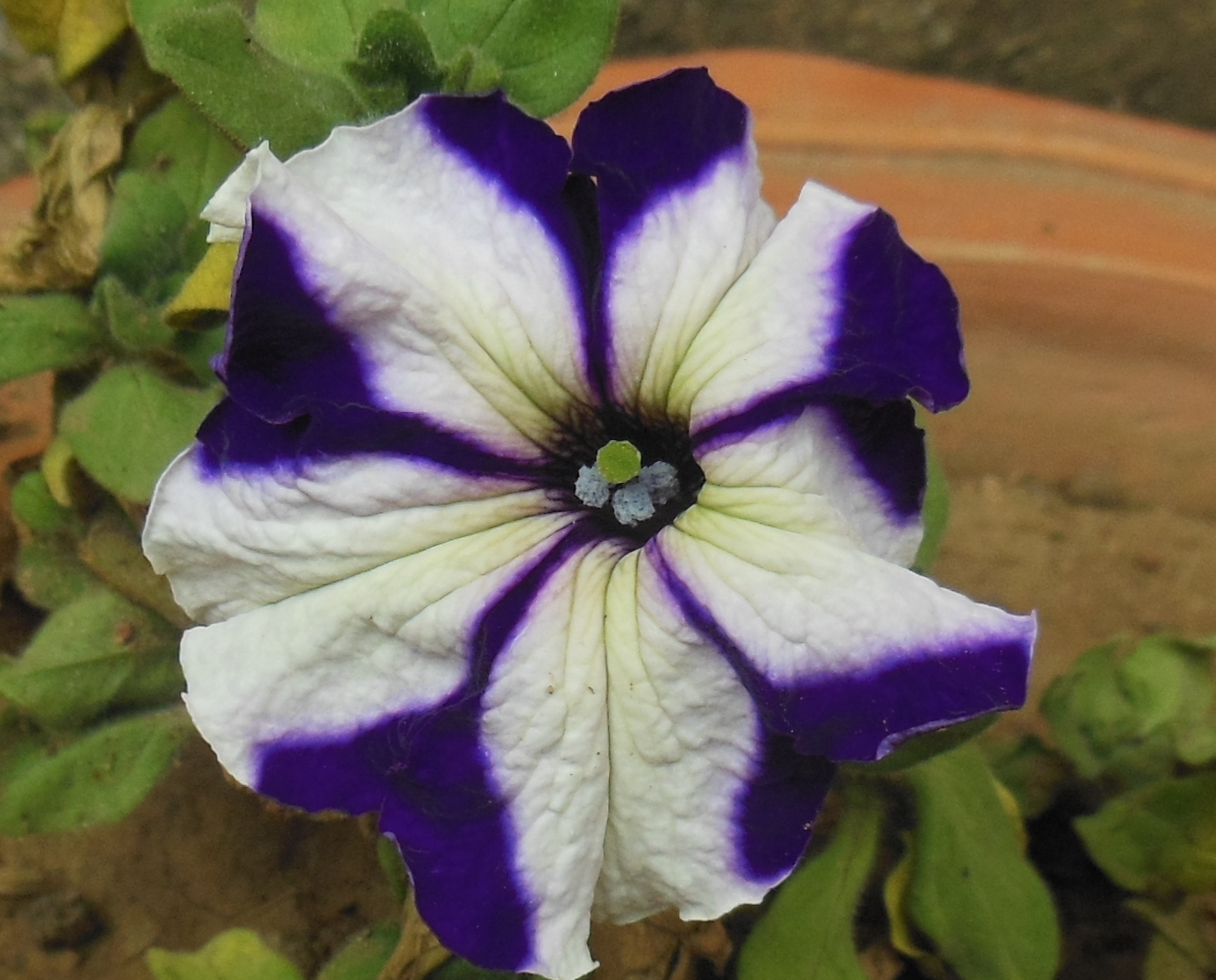
A cultivated form of petunia

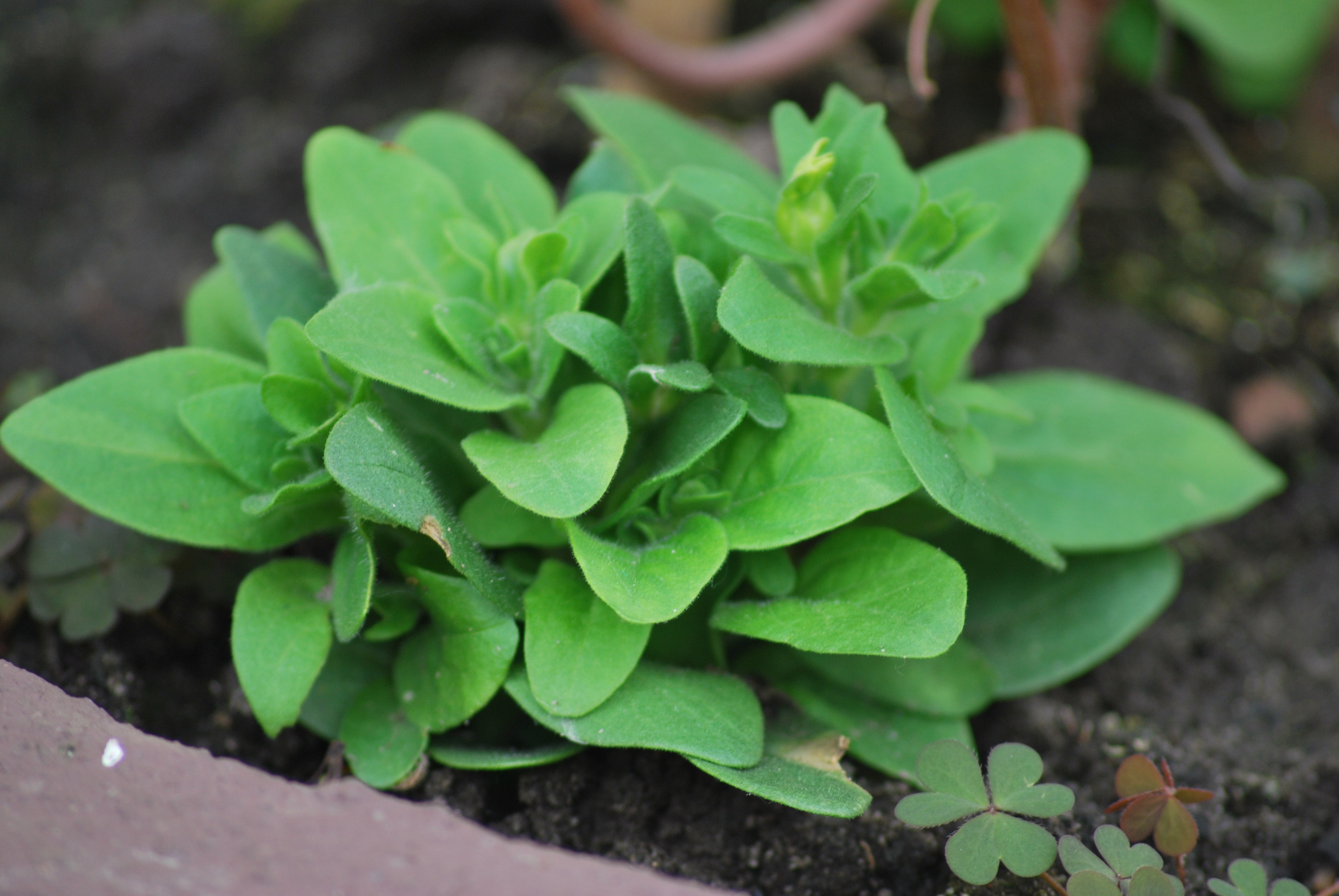
Leaves of Petunia × atkinsiana

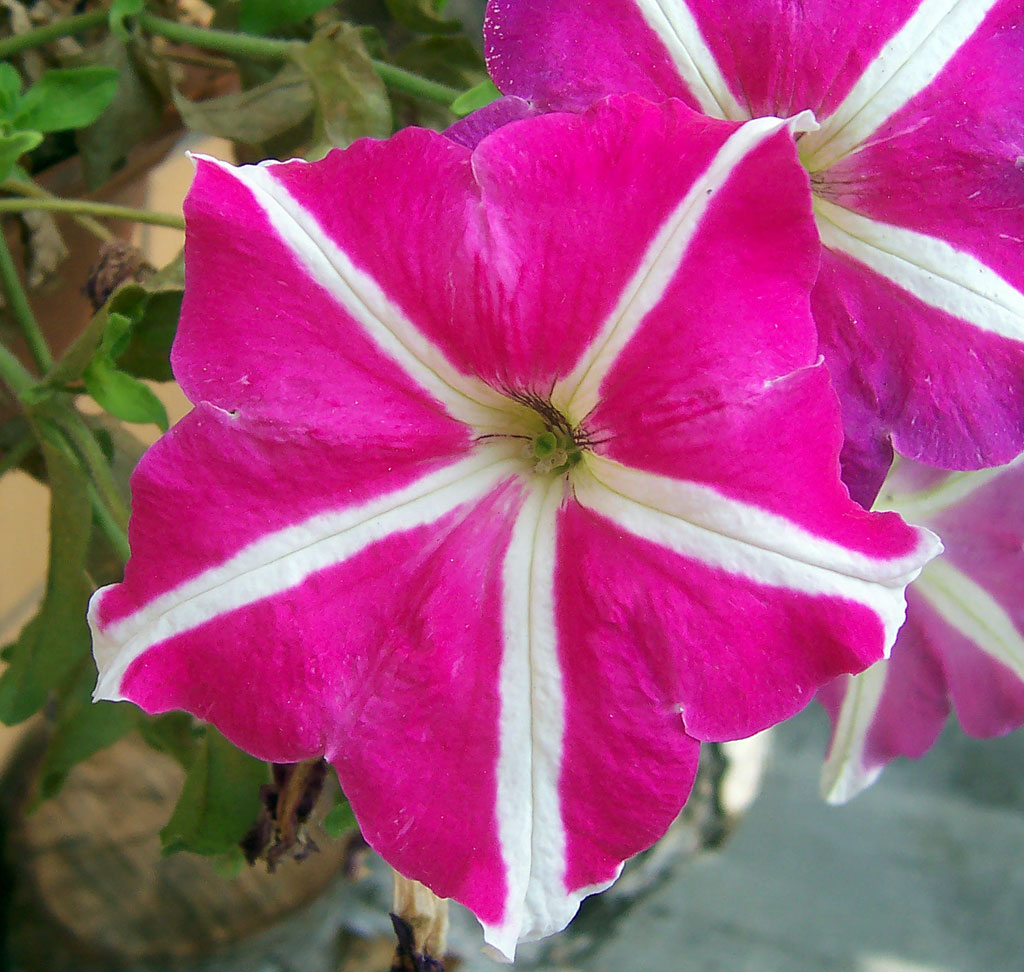
A cultivated form

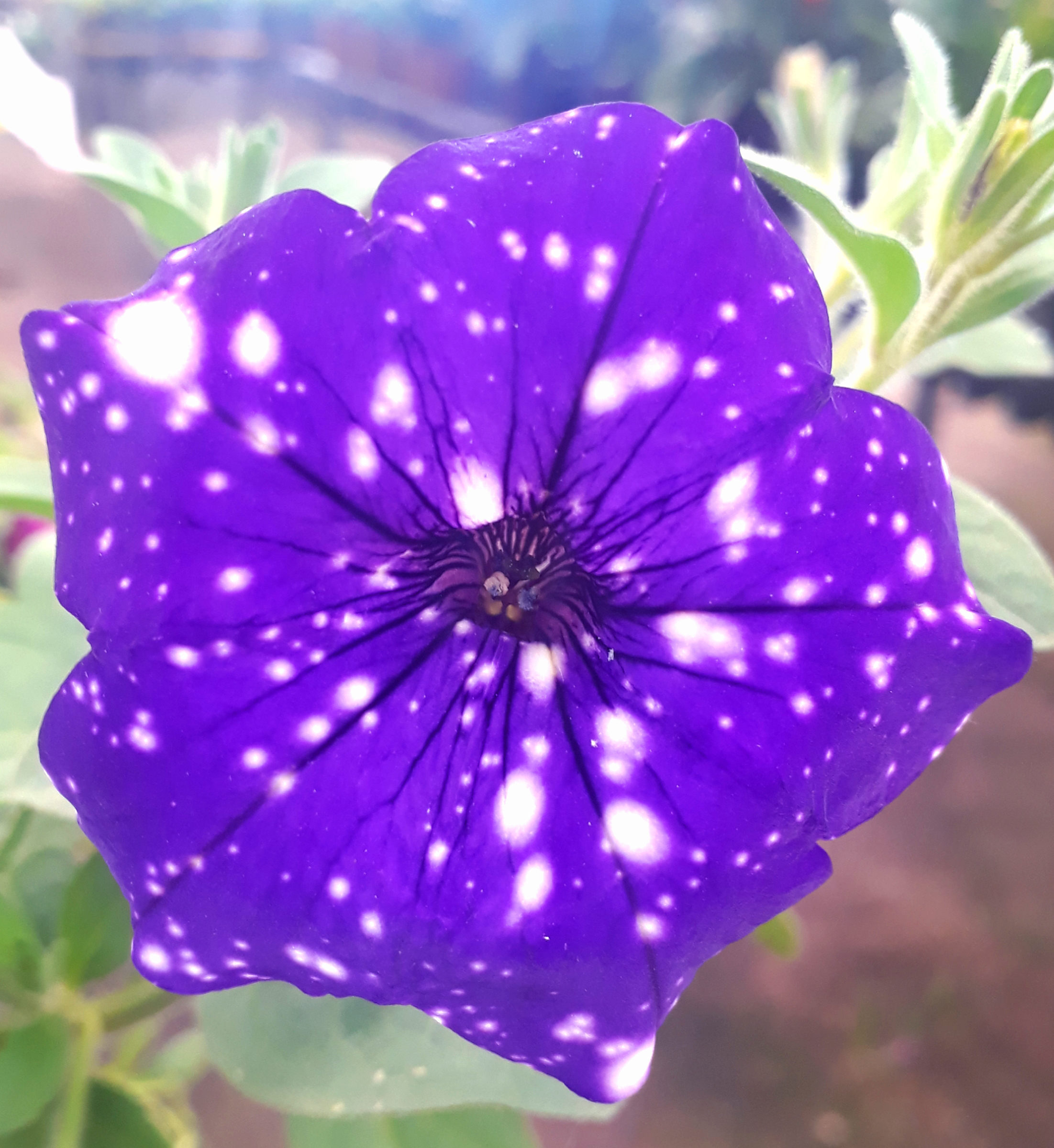
Starry Night, found in Porto Alegre - Brazil.

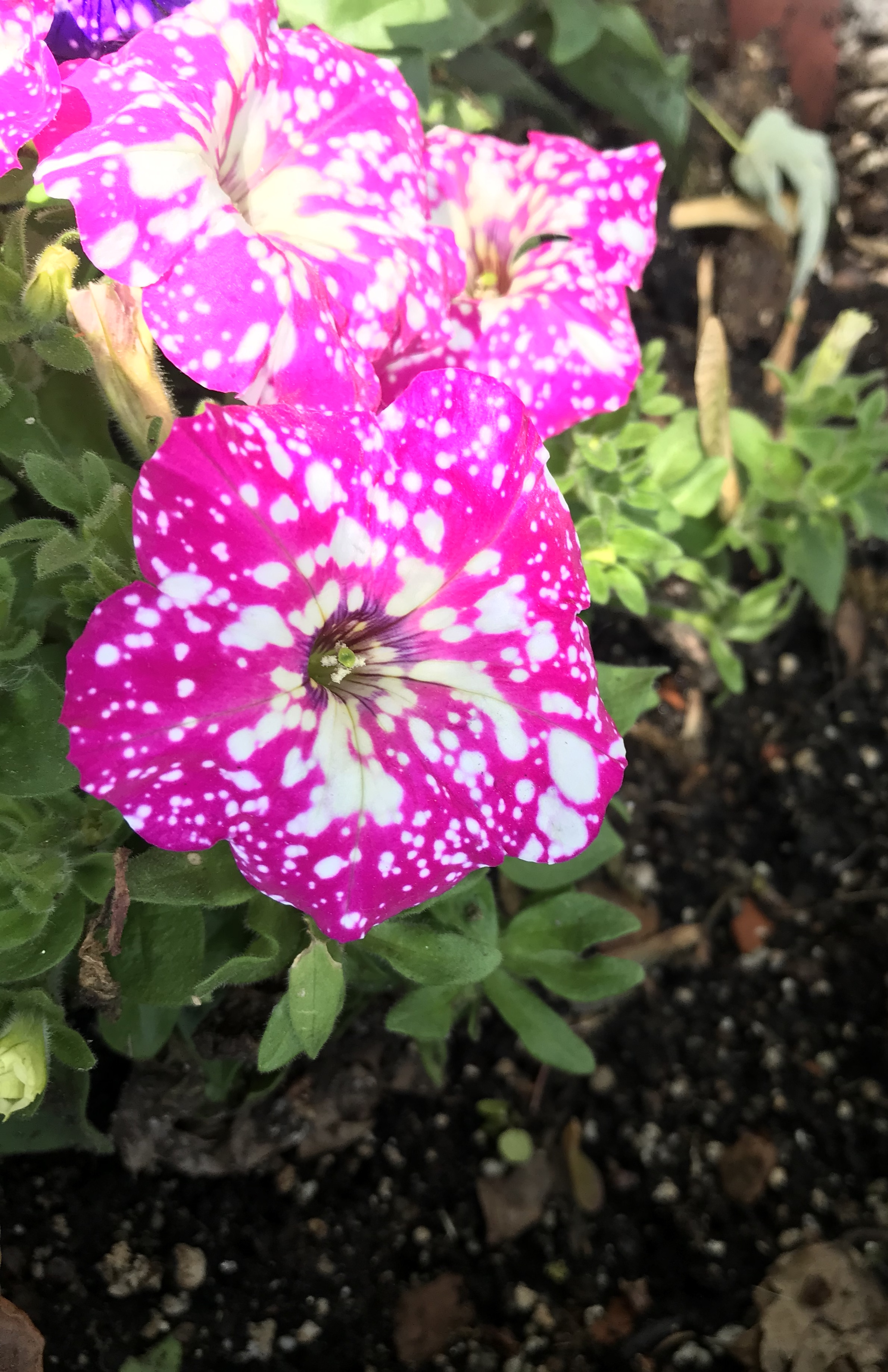
Pink Sky Petunia

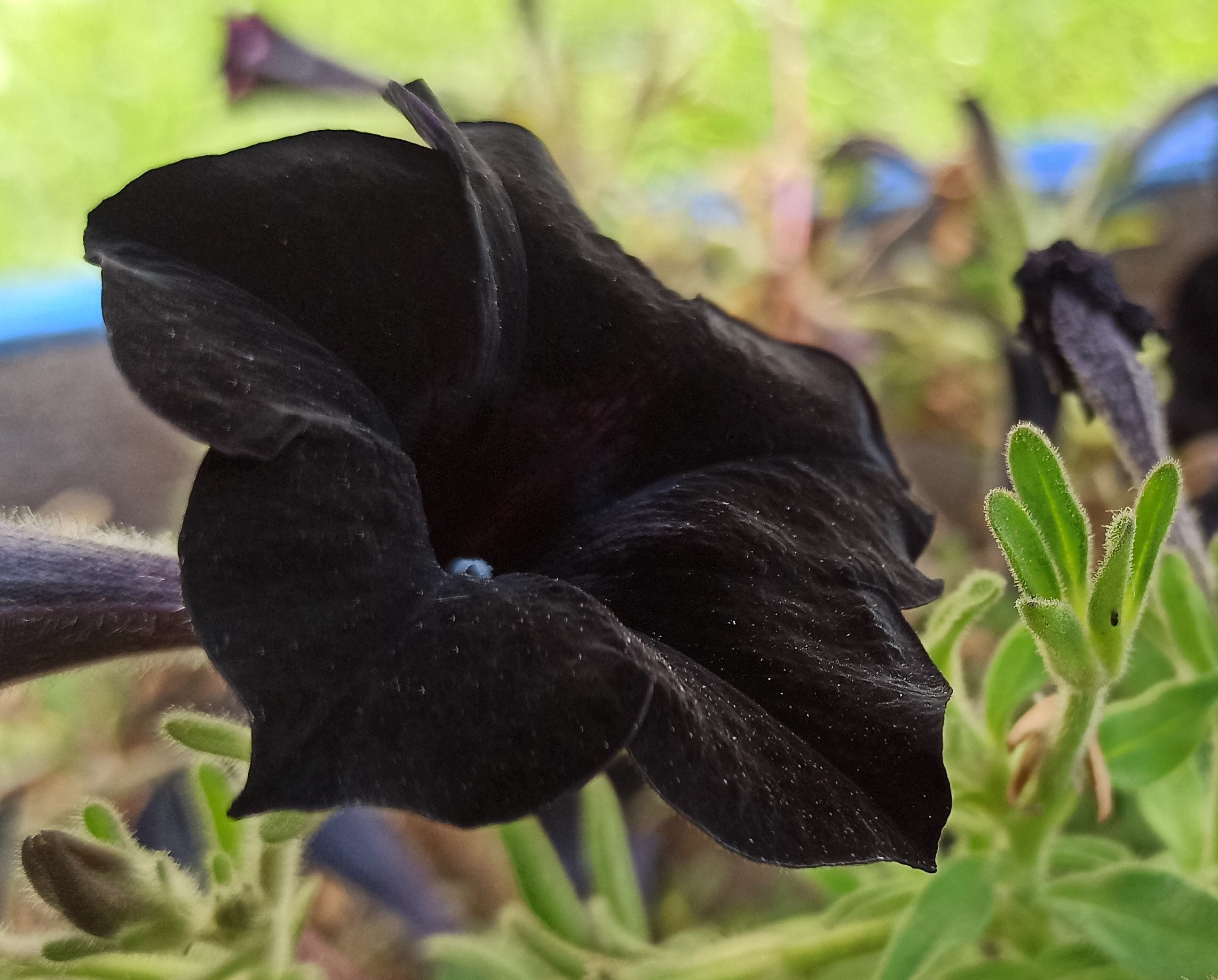
Black Petunia

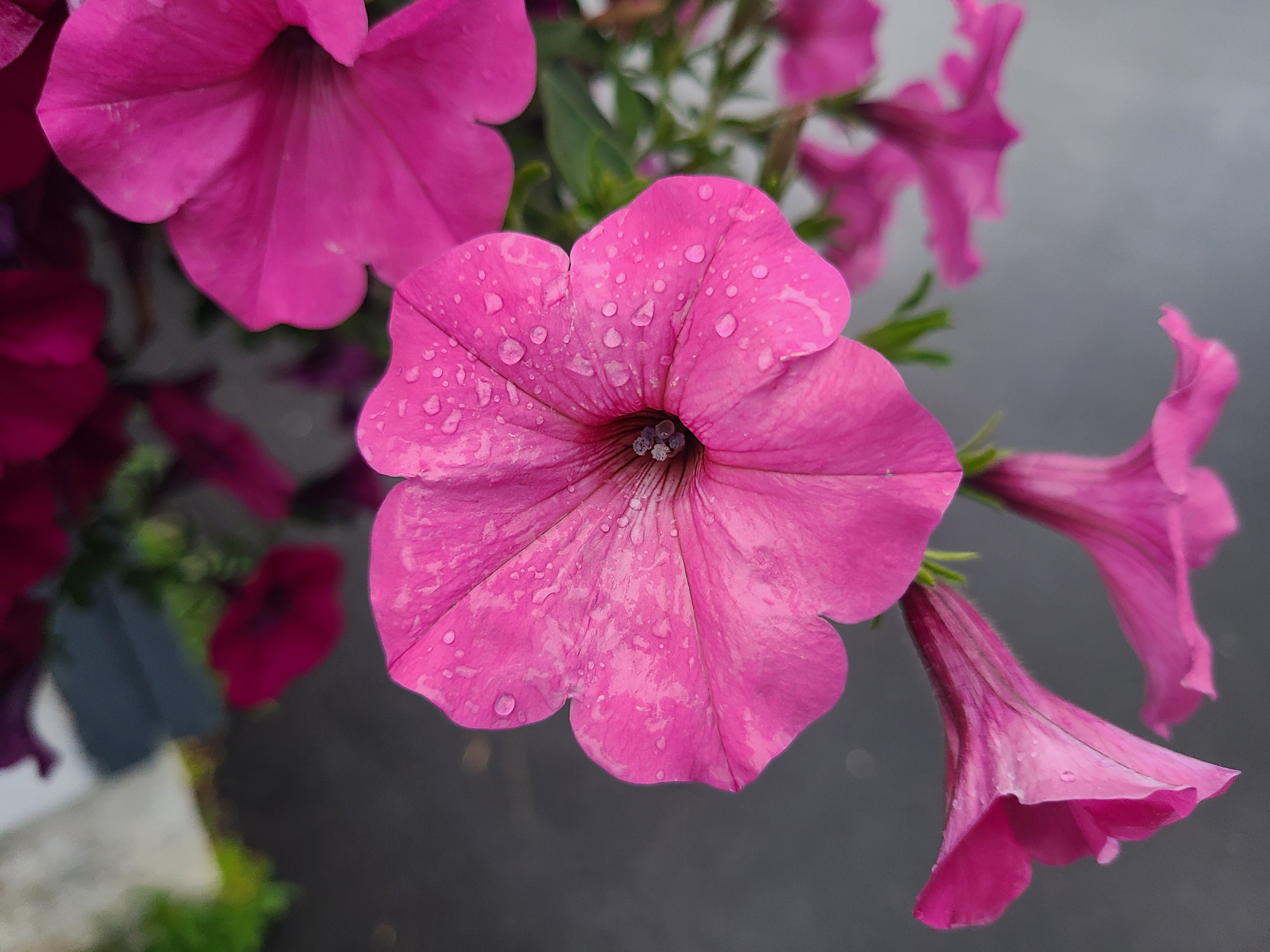
Petunia flowers found growing in Boothbay, Maine

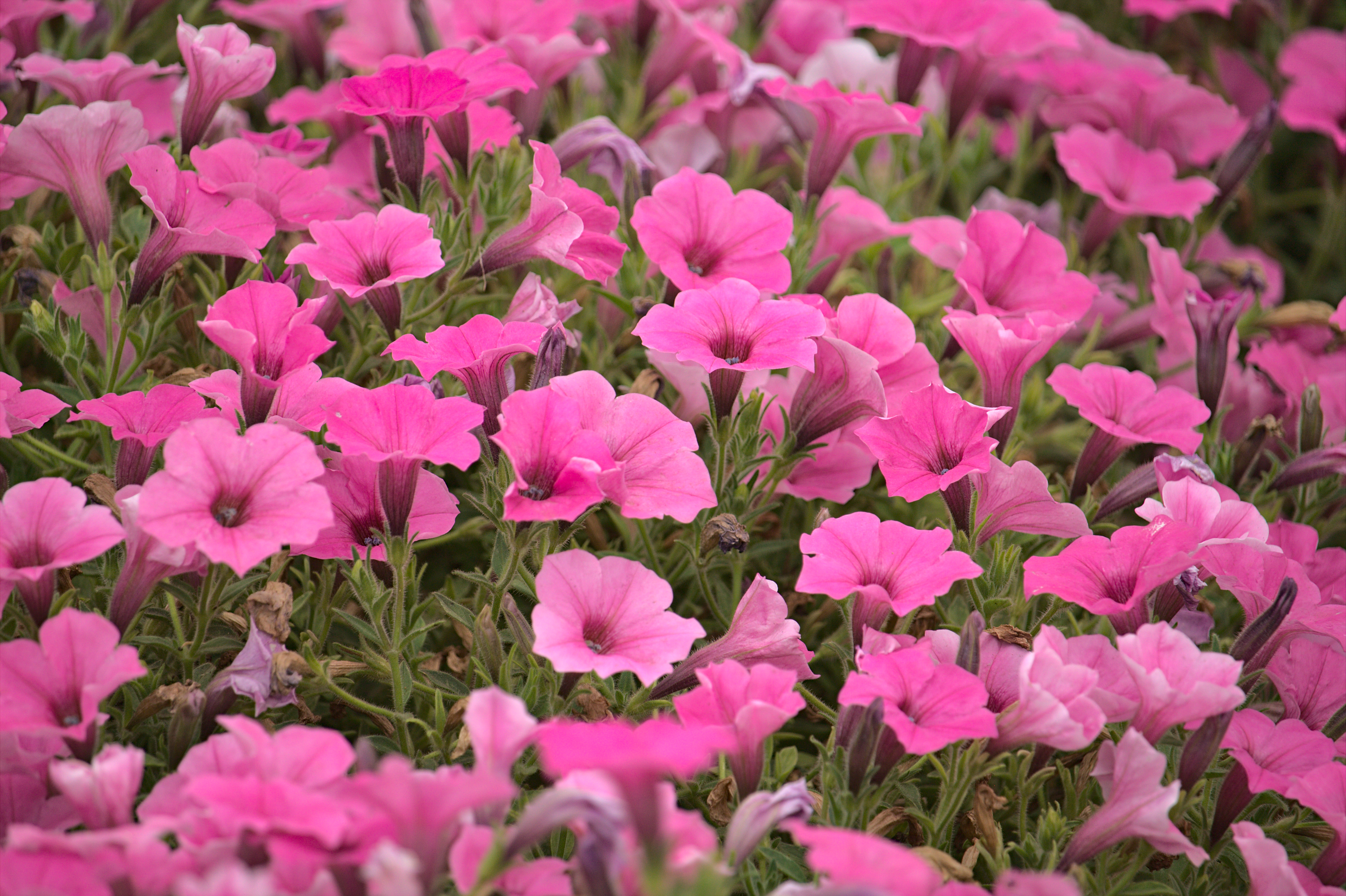
Pink Petunia in Holambra - Brazil

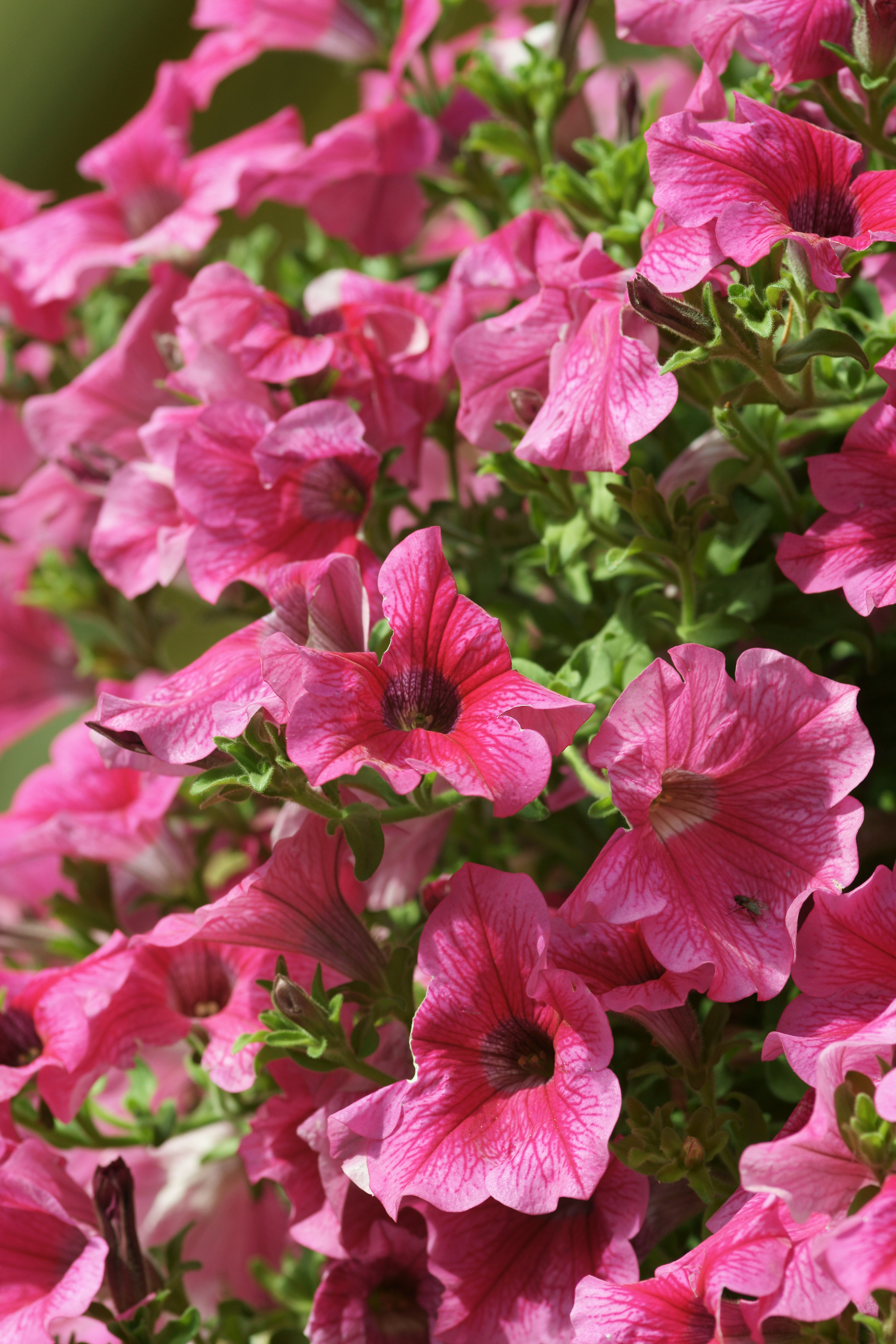
Petunia x hybrida

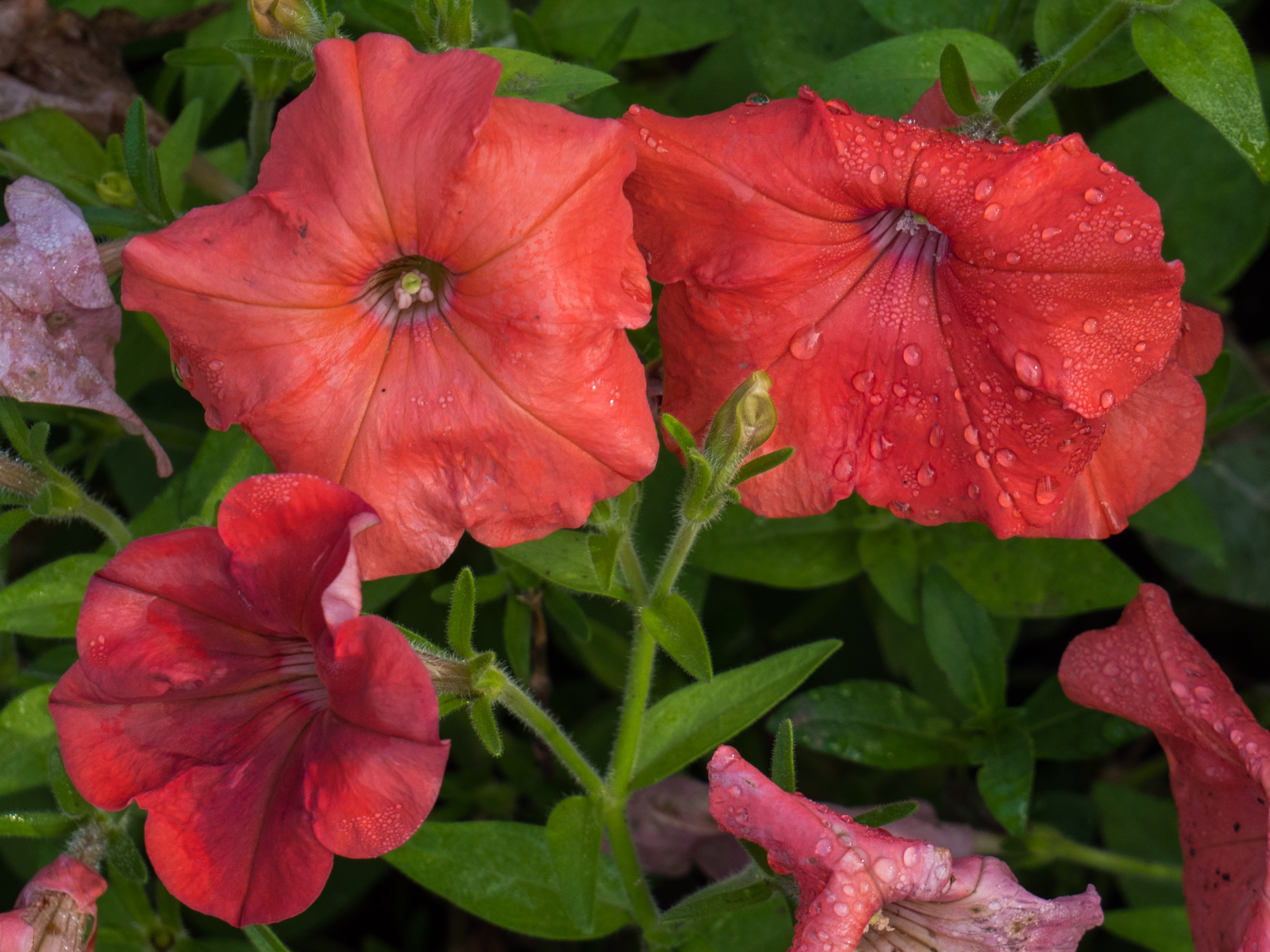
African Sunset, an orange petunia created with genetic modification

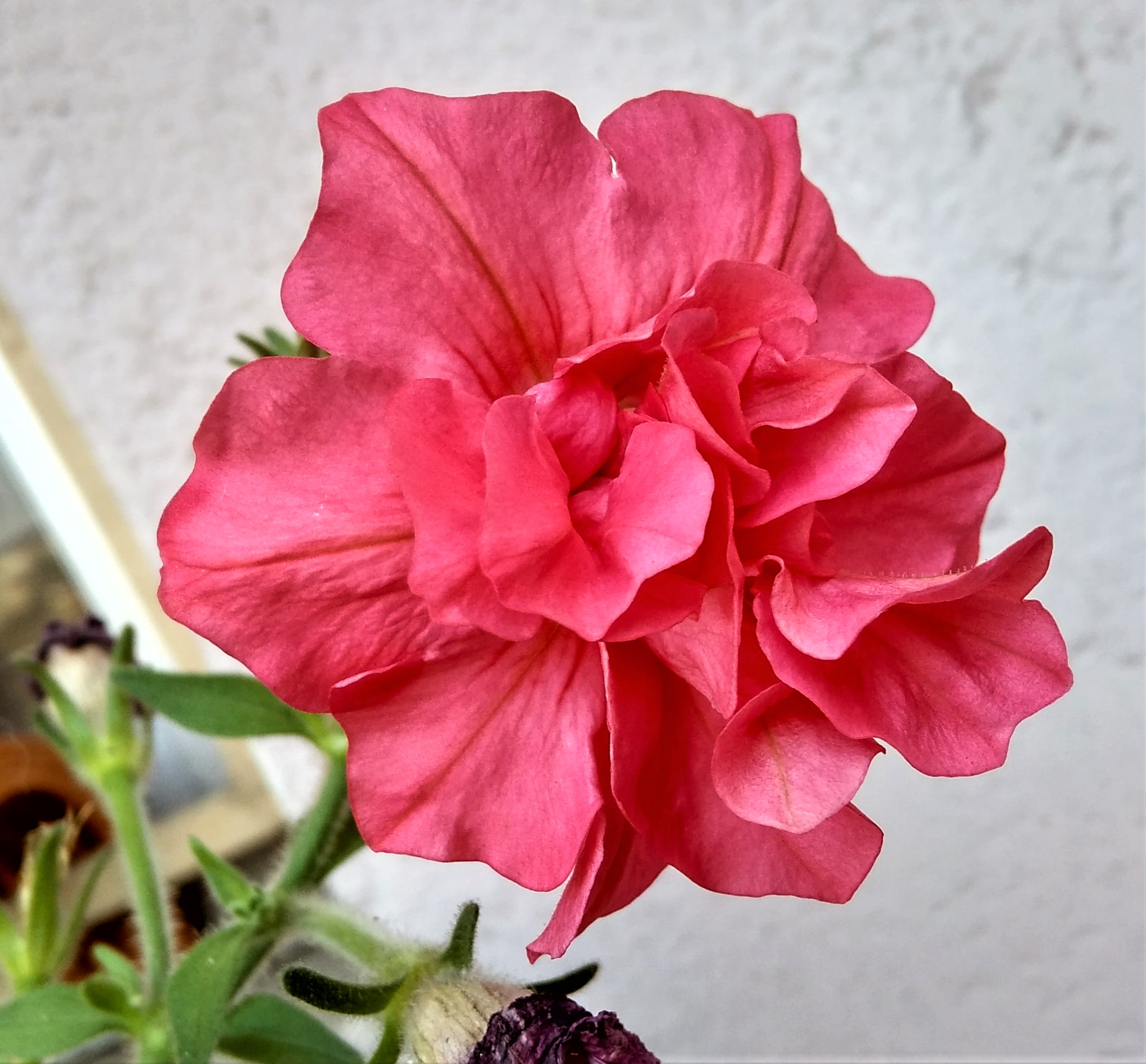
Petunia double petals

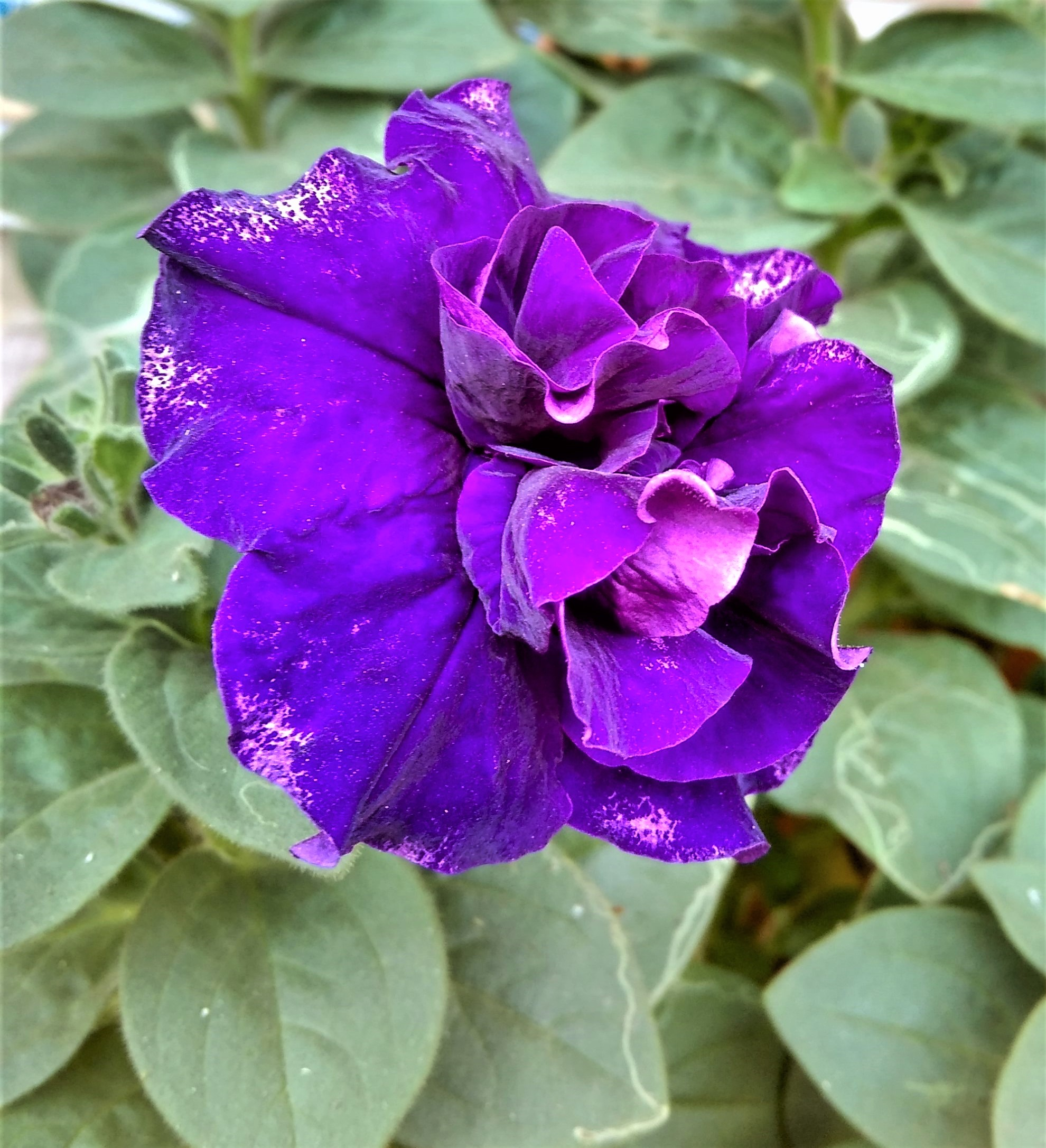
Petunia blue double petals

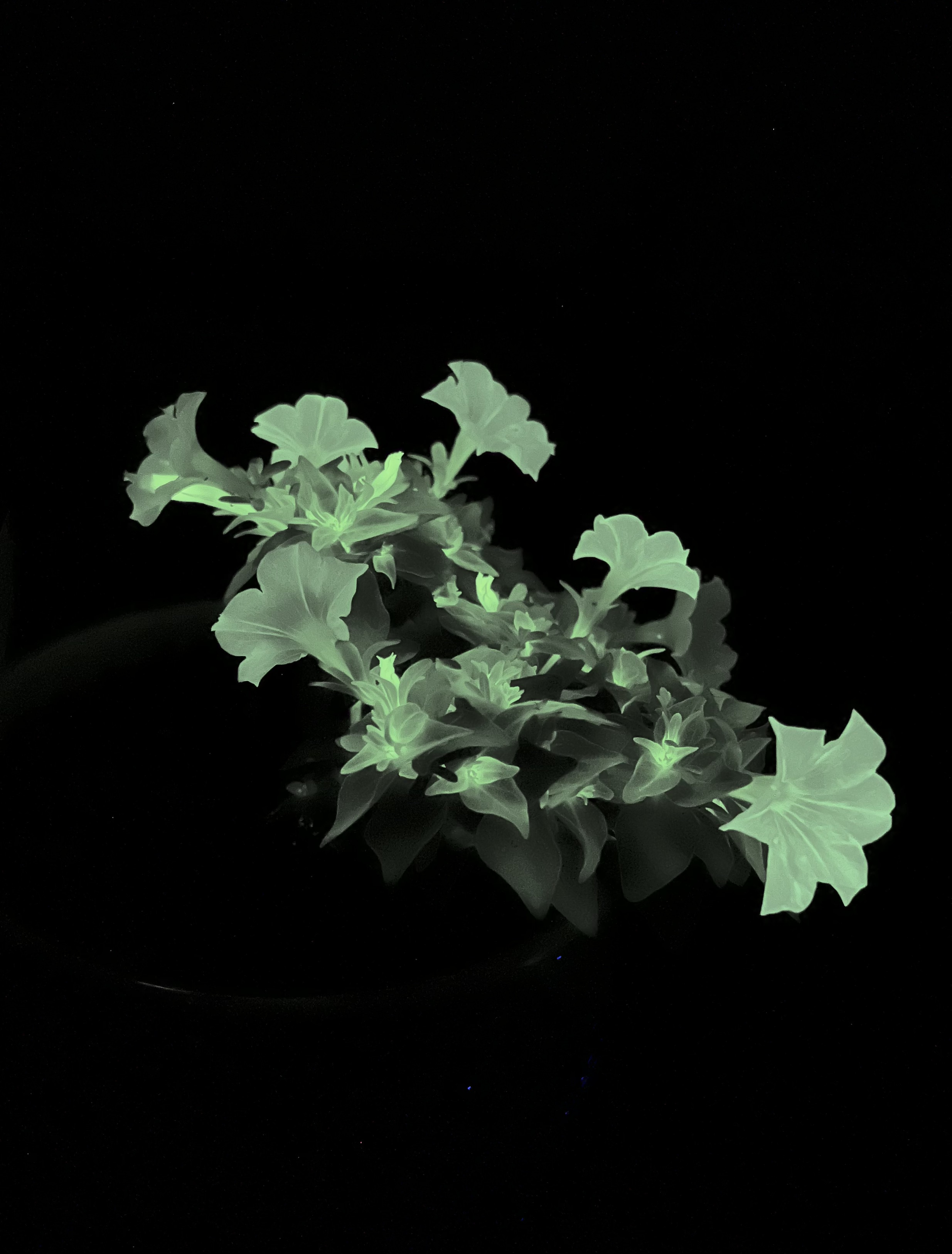
"Firefly" petunia, genetically engineered to produce a glow

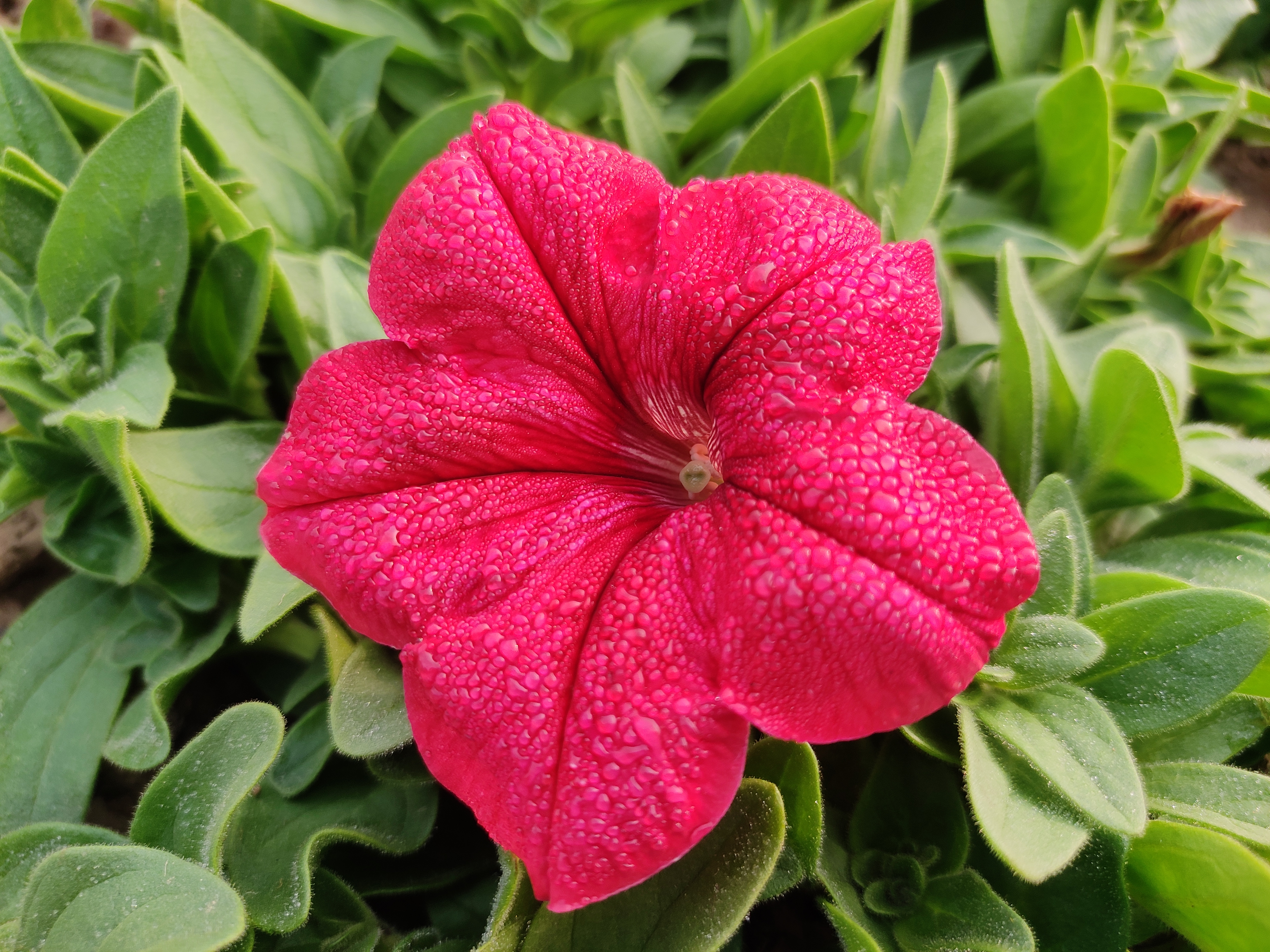
Carmine Red Petunia

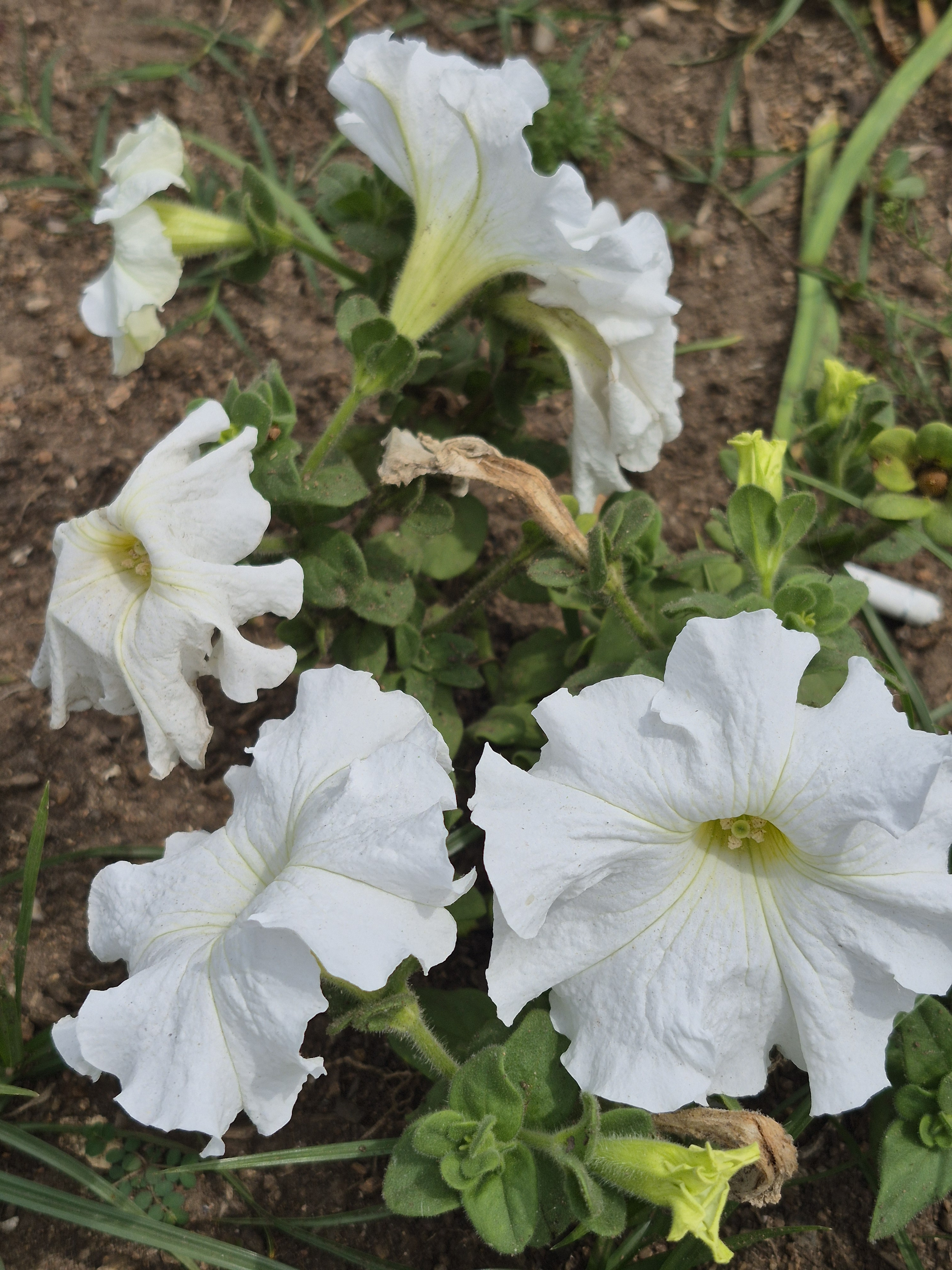
Petunia axillaris
