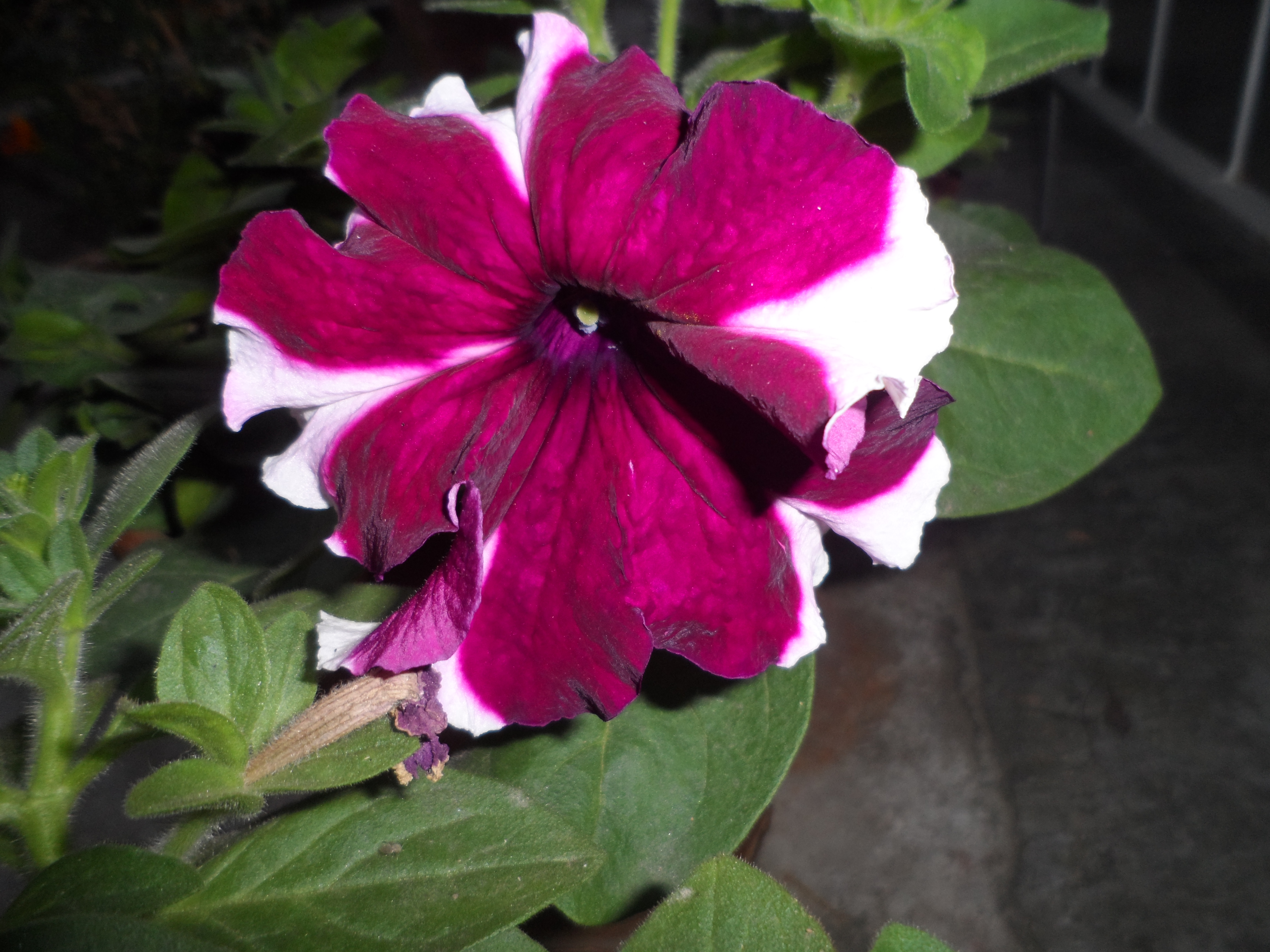
- Common garden petunia

Scientific classification
- Kingdom: Plantae
- Clade: Tracheophytes
- Clade: Angiosperms
- Clade: Eudicots
- Clade: Asterids
- Order: Solanales
- Family: Solanaceae
- Genus: Petunia
- Species: P. × atkinsiana

Binomial name
- Petunia × atkinsiana (Sweet) D. Don ex W. H. Baxter

Synonyms
- Nierembergia ×atkinsiana Sweet; Petunia × hybrida hort. ex E. Vilm.

= Petunia × atkinsiana =

Species of flowering plant

Petunia × atkinsiana (pronounced: puh-TOO-nee-uh at-kin-see-AH-nuh) (synonym: Petunia × hybrida) is a Petunia plant "nothospecies" (hybrid), which encompasses all hybrid species of petunia between P. axillaris and P. integrifolia. Most of the petunias sold for cultivation in home gardens are this type and belong to this nothospecies. It is said to have originated with the Quaker plantsman James Atkins at his nursery at Painshill in 1834 but did not spread around the world until the 1990s.

== Characteristics ==
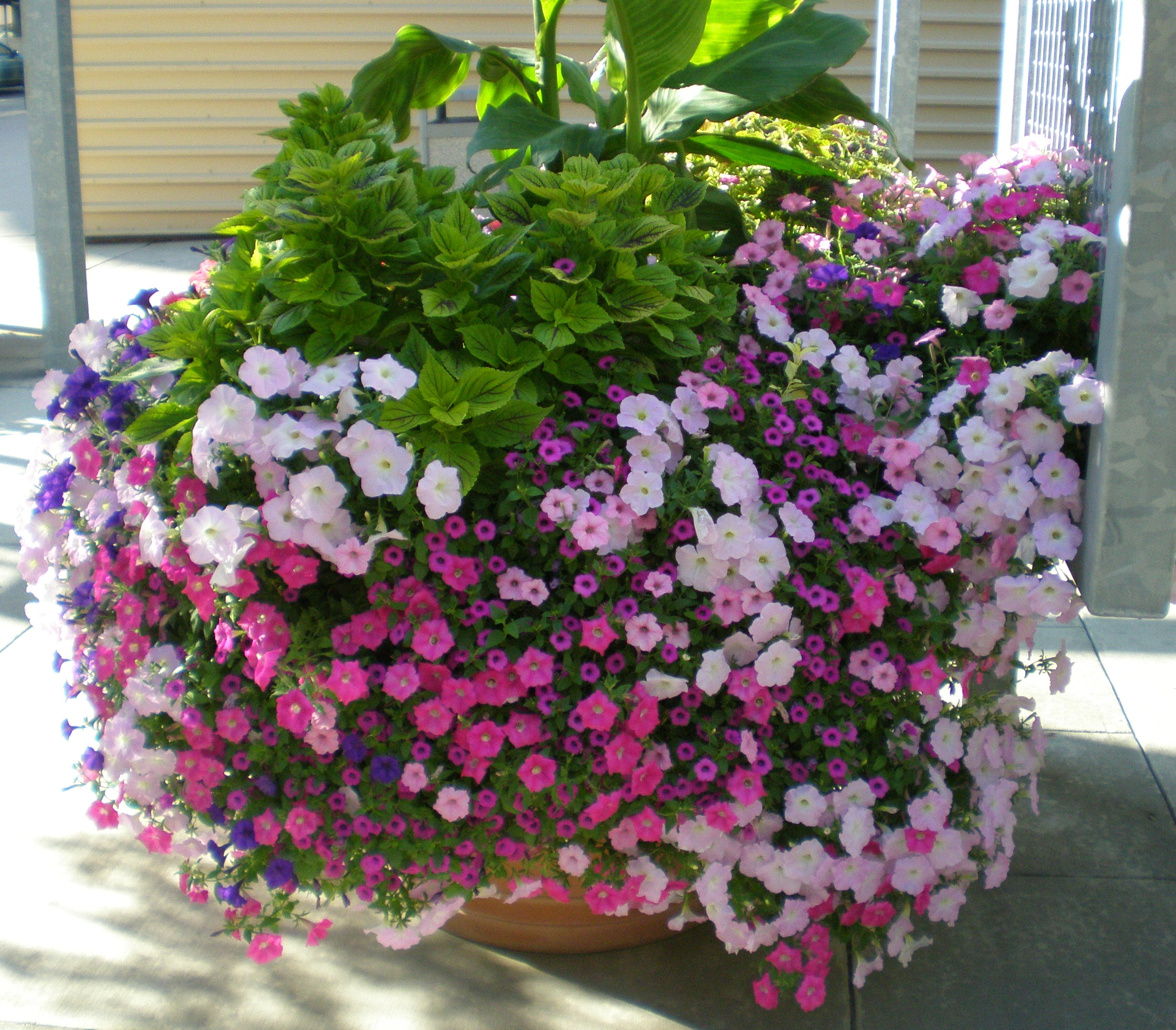
Floral arrangement of petunias in Columbus, Ohio

Petunia × atkinsiana plants were originally produced by hybridisation between P. axillaris (the large white or night-scented petunia) and P. integrifolia (the violet-flowered petunia) and other members of its complex, including Petunia inflata. P. axillaris bears night-fragrant, buff-white blossoms with long, thin tubes and somewhat flattened openings. The scent molecules emitted by the hybrids are generally similar to those from P. axillaris.

== Cultivation ==
Petunia seeds germinate in 5 to 15 days. Petunias can tolerate relatively harsh conditions and hot climates. They need at least five hours of sunlight every day. They grow well in low humidity, moist soil. Young plants can be grown from seeds. Petunias should be watered once every two to five days. In drier regions, the plants should be watered daily. Dead corollas and seed-capsules should be removed to encourage further branching and flowering. Maximum growth occurs in late spring. The application of fertilizers once a month will help to promote quick growth. Petunias may readily be cultivated in tubs, window boxes, hanging baskets and other containers.

== Categories ==
=== Grandiflora ===
This type of petunia has the largest flowers, up to 4 inches (100 mm) in diameter. Of all the petunias, these have the widest variety of forms and colours but are the most likely to be damaged by heavy rain. There are four types of grandiflora and they are classified by their colours: 'Daddy Series' (shades of pink and purple), 'Merlin Blue Morn' (blue and white), 'Supercascade Series' (many colours) and 'Ultra Series' (many colours, including bi-colour).

=== Hedgiflora (spreading) ===
Hedgifloras or spreading petunias (sometimes called ground-cover) are characterised by their low height (usually about six inches (150 mm)), but they have a large spread (about 3 to 4 feet (0.91 to 1.22 m)). They will cover a large area, provided they have adequate water and fertilization. 'Purple Wave' was the first introduced cultivar of spreading petunia and grows to a height of 4 inches (100 mm). 'Tidal Wave' is another spreading type of petunia but is much taller (between 16–22 inches (410–560 mm)). 'Surfinia' petunias are another type of spreading petunia propagated by cuttings. 'Opera Supreme' is a cultivar with large flowers.

=== Multiflora ===
Multifloras are half the size of grandifloras, being 2 inches (51 mm) in diameter. They are not easily damaged in heavy rain and are more sun-tolerant. Multiflora petunia cultivars include: 'Carpet Series' (many colours) and 'Madness Series' (many colours). They spread quickly and are ideal for baskets.

=== Milliflora ===
Millifloras are the smallest of the petunias, being about 1-inch (25 mm) across. These are commonly mixed with other plants in containers, along garden beds and edges. Millifloras are available in 'Fantasy Series' (red, purple, pink) and are the easiest to find. 'Supertunia Mini Series' (blue, pink, lilac, purple and white) are also available in the milliflora category. They tolerate harsh weather better when compared with grandifloras and multifloras.

A common descriptor is Picotee, meaning that the edge of the flower is a different colour to the base, as in 'Fortunia Pink Picotee'.

== AGM cultivars ==
The following cultivars have won the Royal Horticultural Society's Award of Garden Merit:

- 'Storm Lavender'
- 'Storm Pink'
- 'Storm Salmon'

== Petunia cultivars showing different colours ==
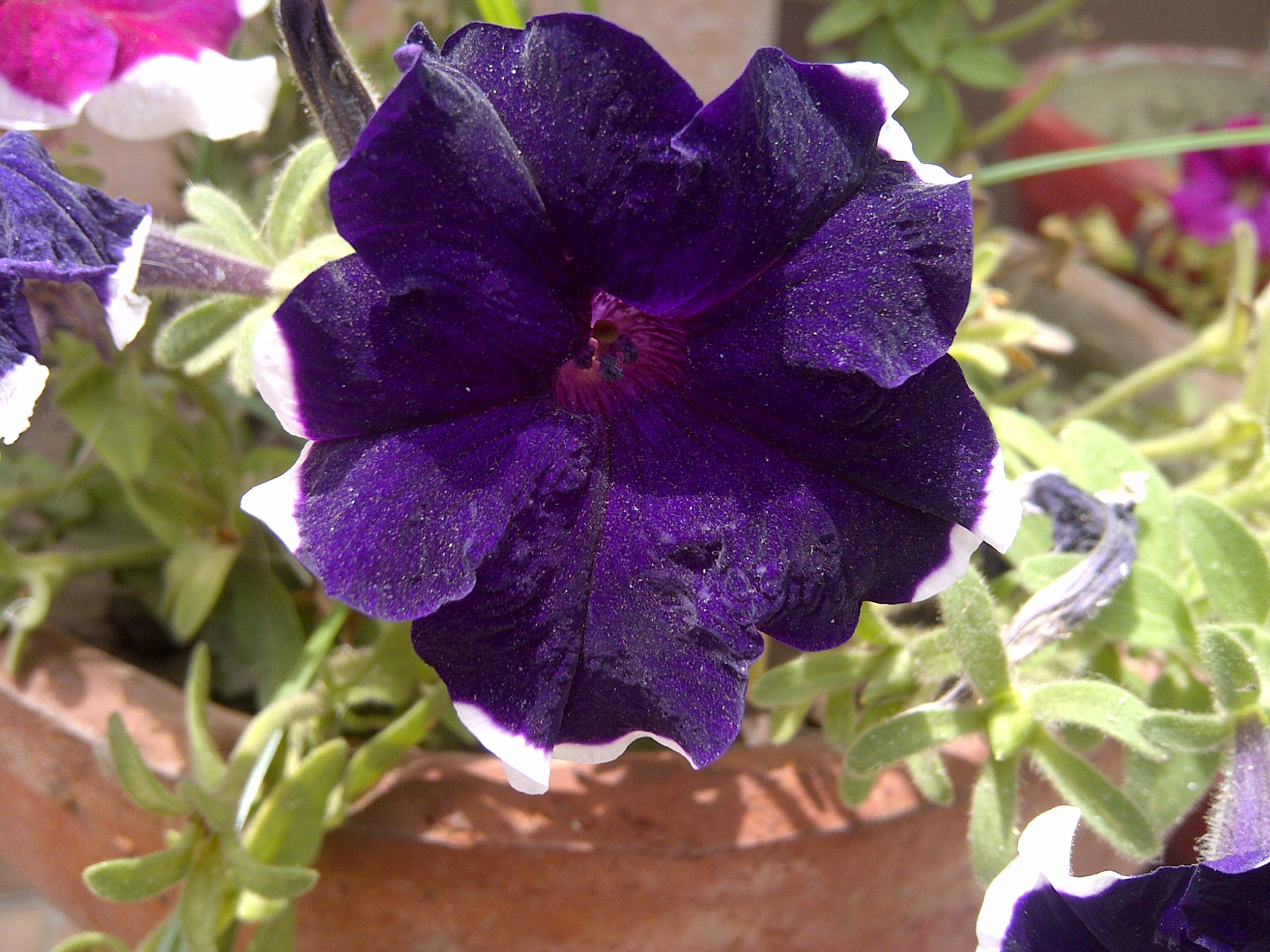
Petunia 'Sweet Sunshine Dark Violet'

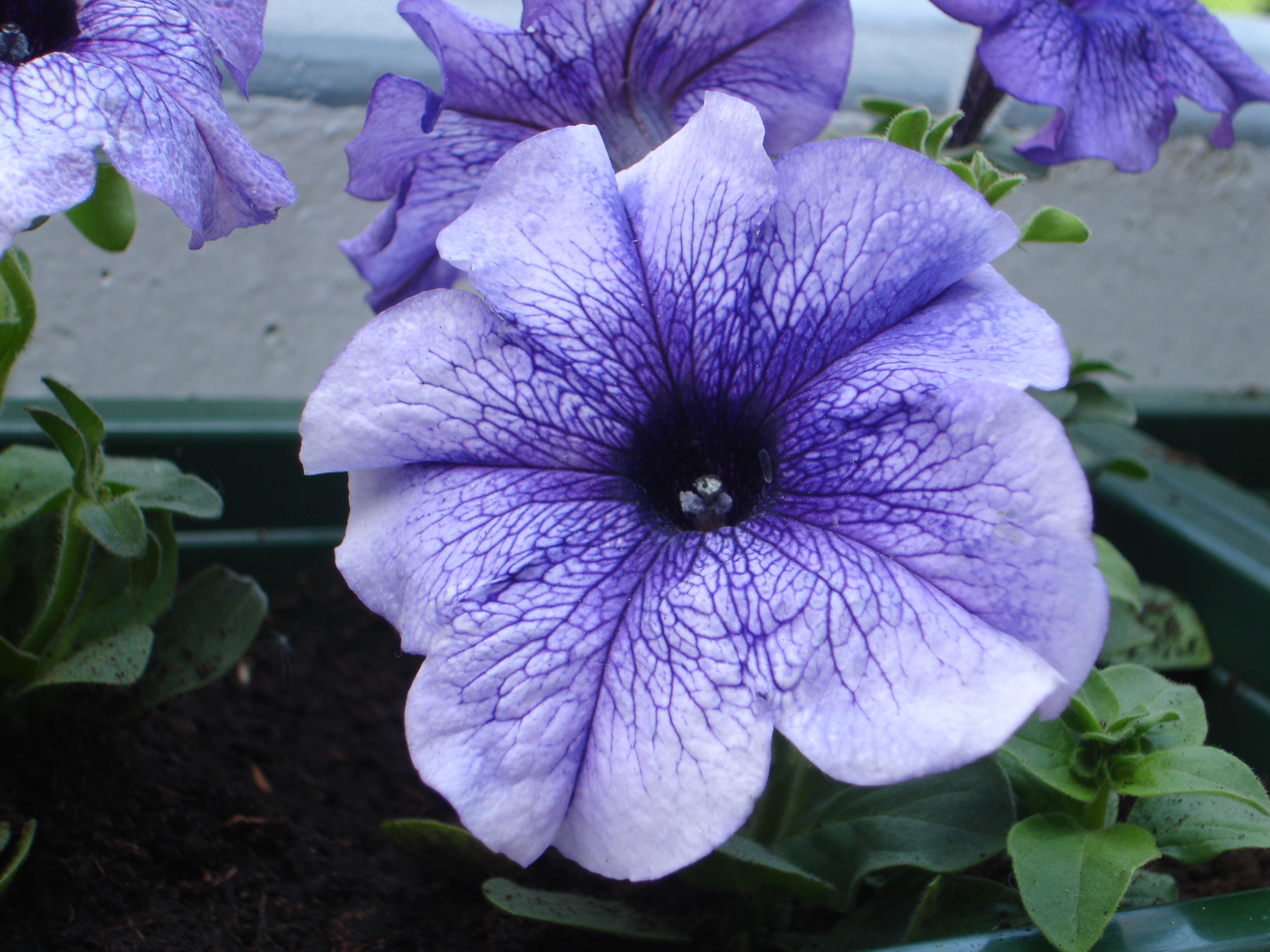
grandiflora Petunia 'Blue Daddy'

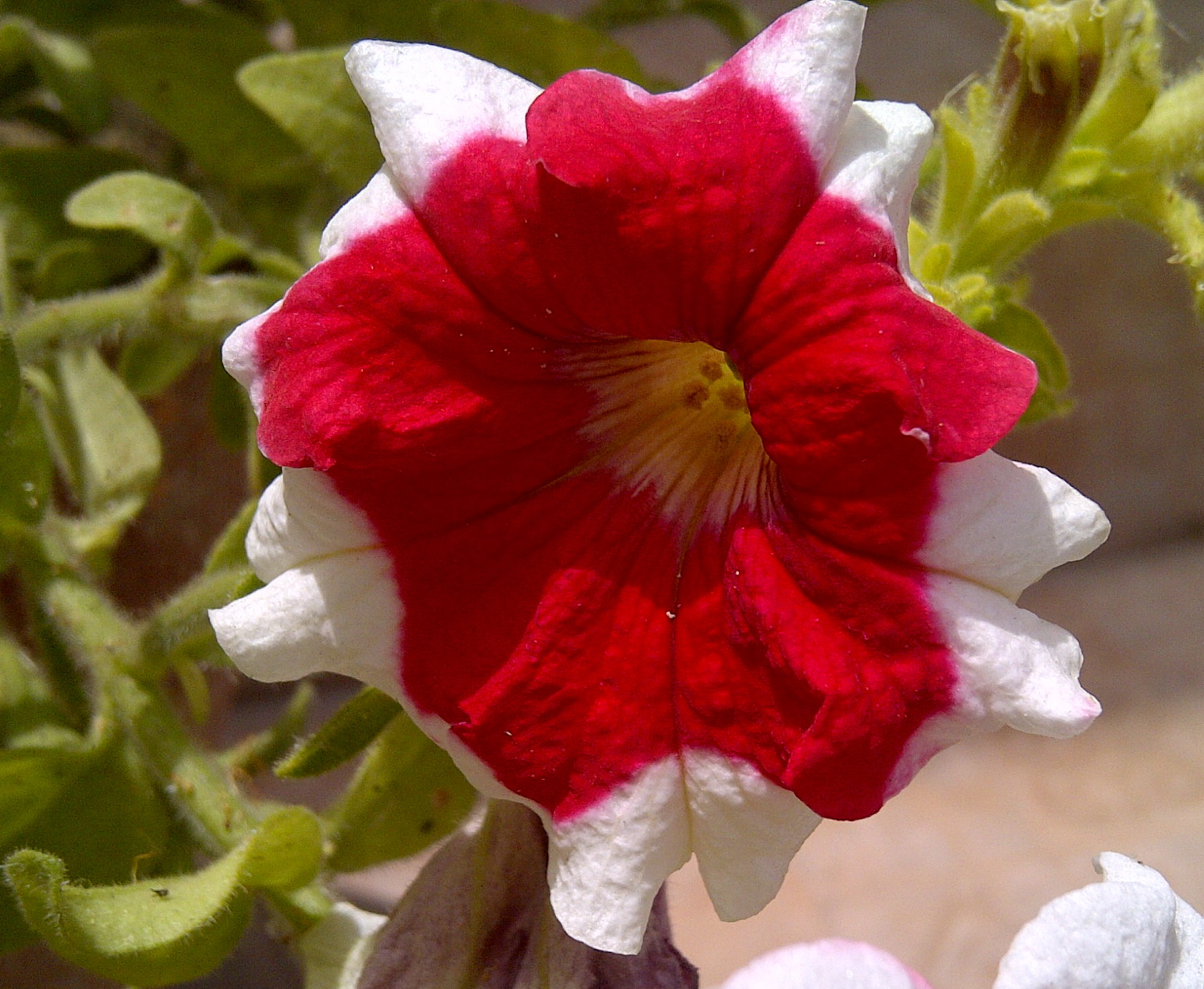
Petunia 'Hula Hoop Red'

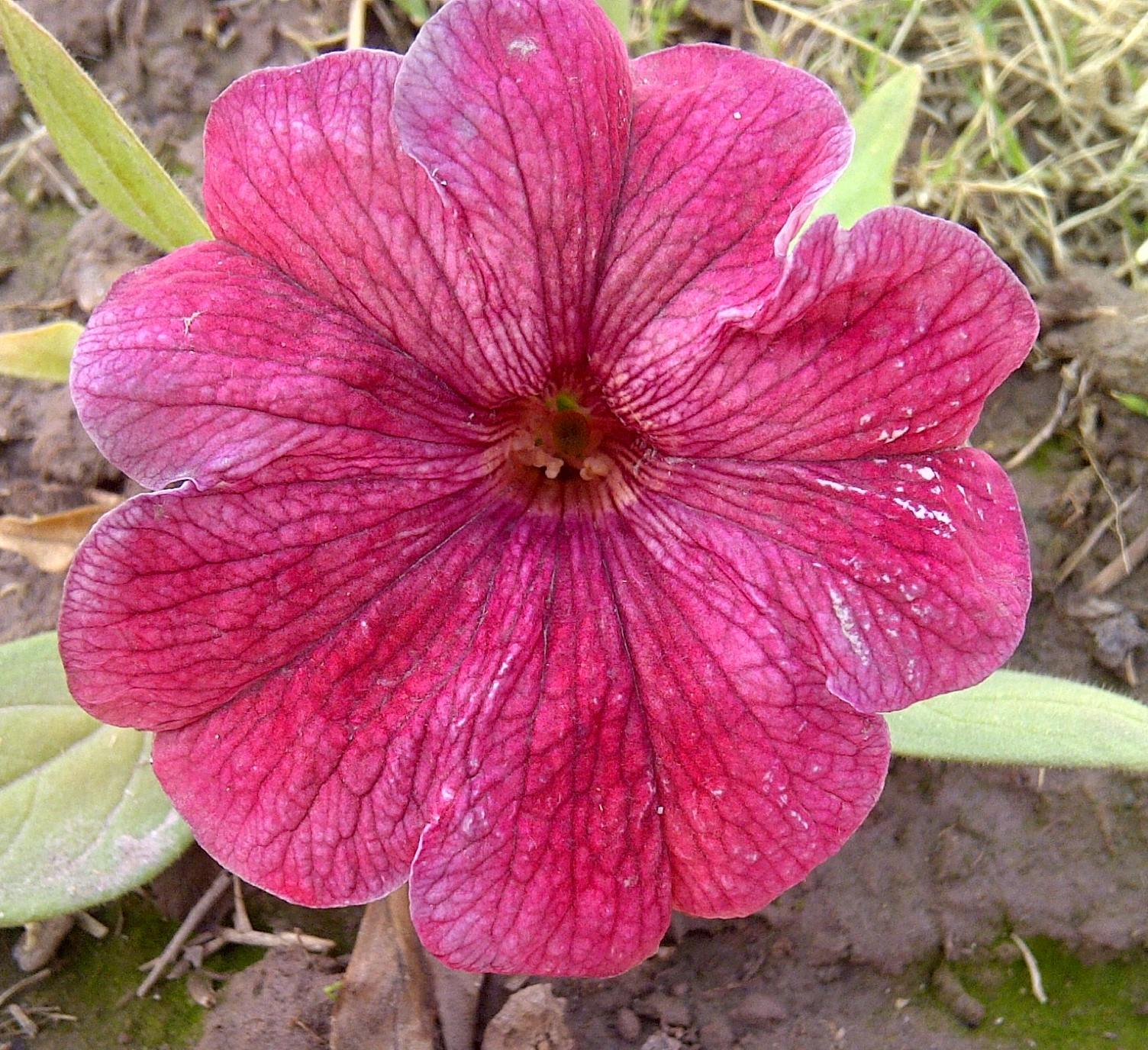
grandiflora Petunia 'Sugar'

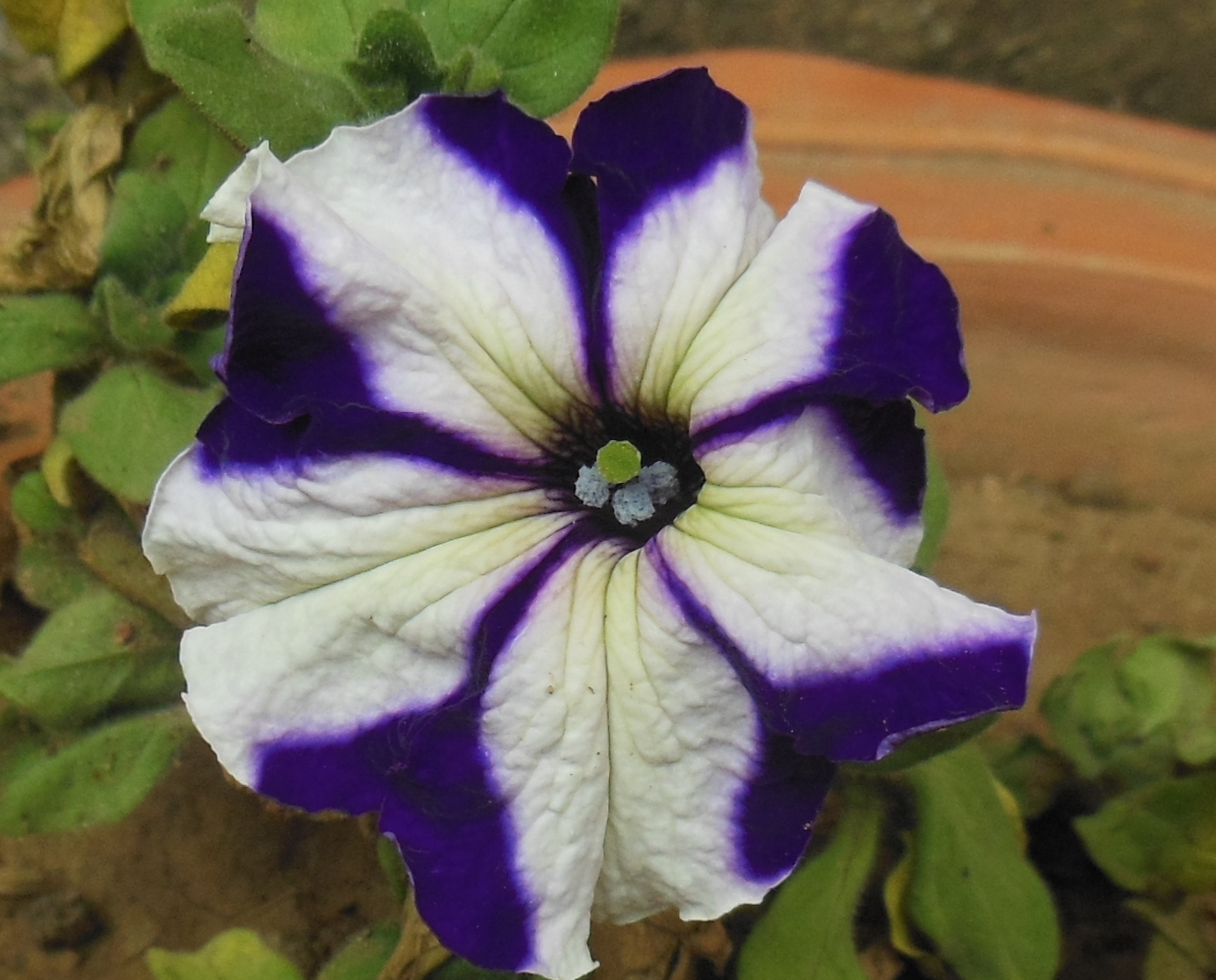
Petunia 'Ultra Blue Star'

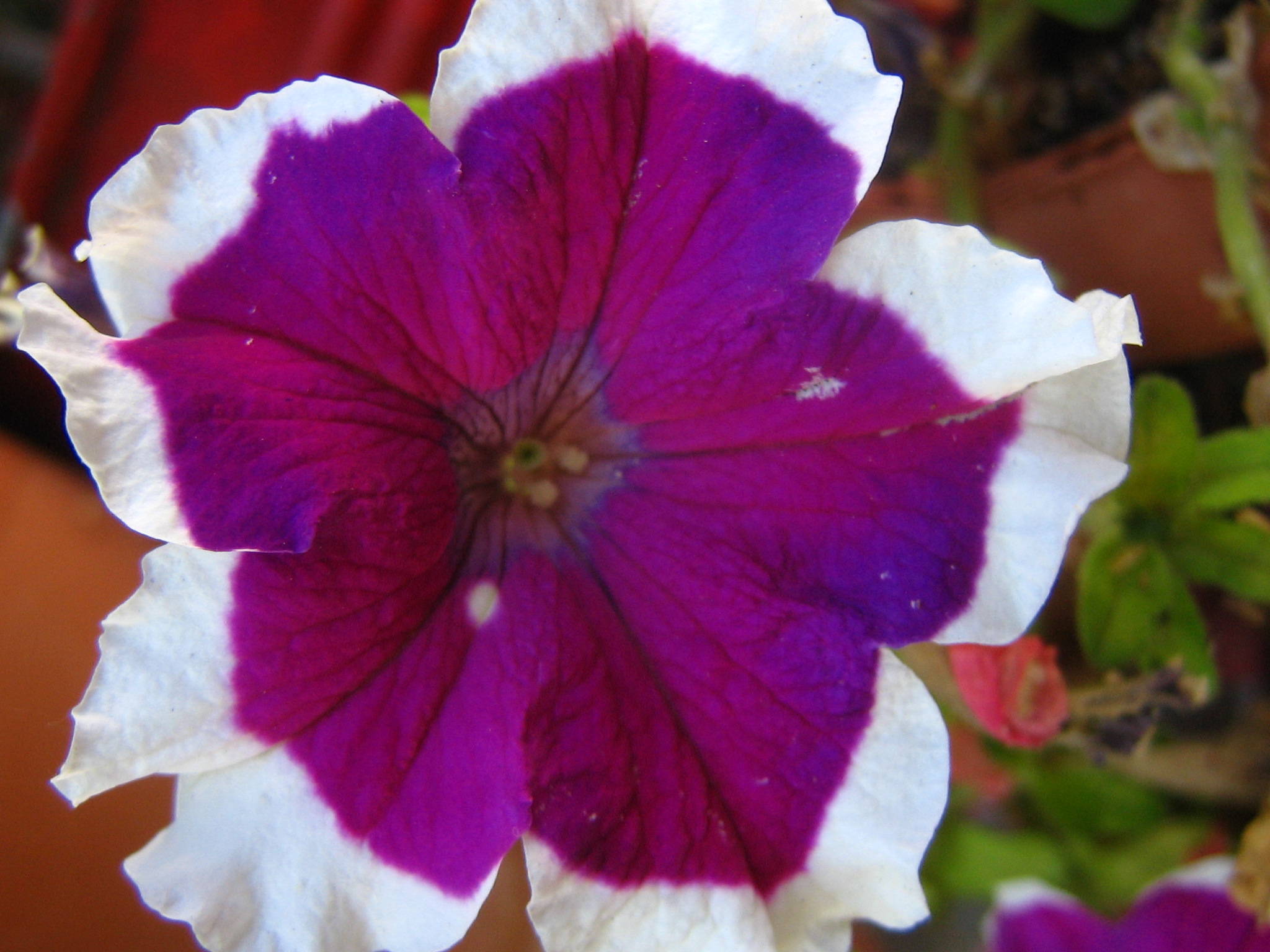
Petunia 'Blue Frost'

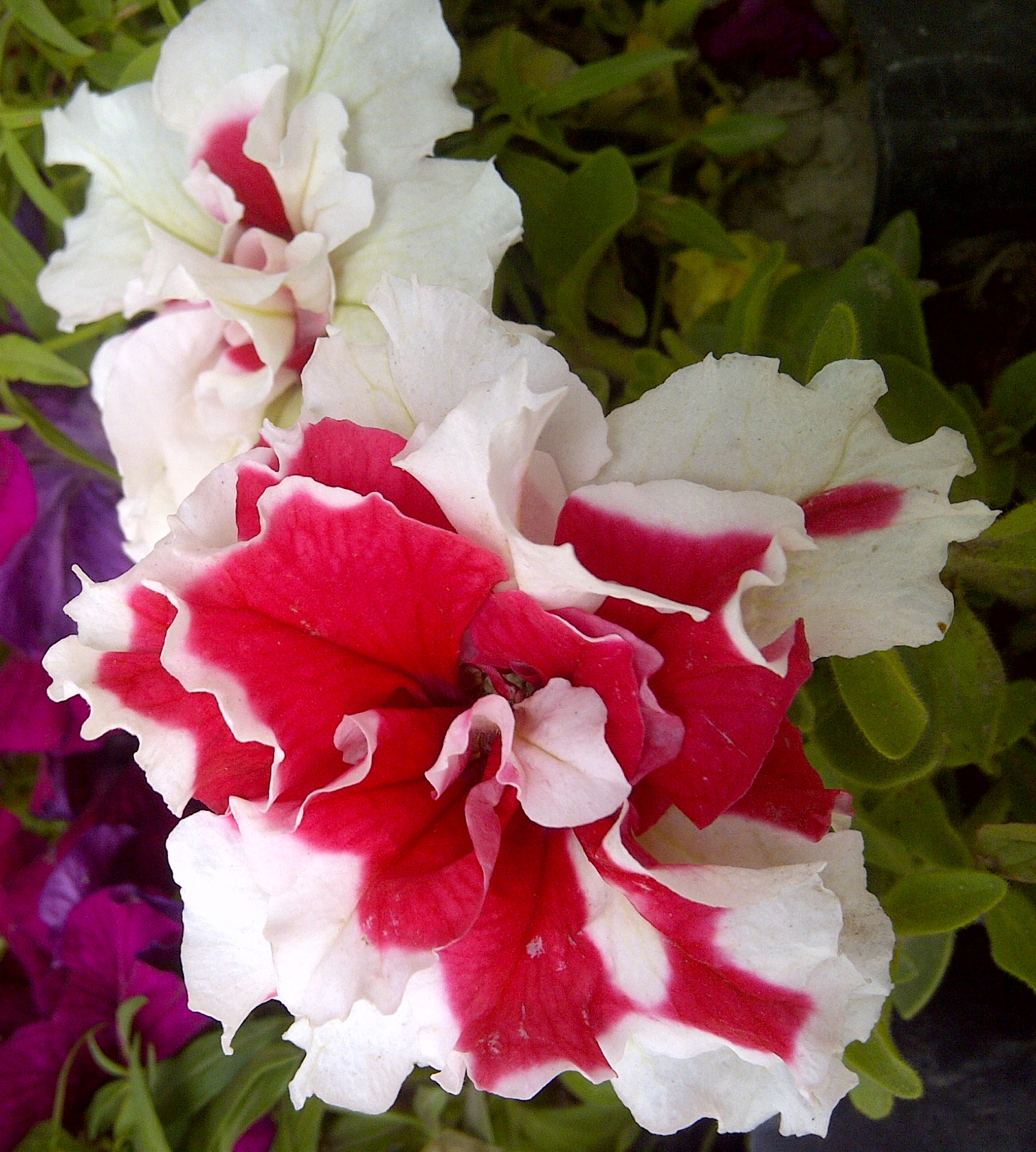
Petunia 'Red Pirouette'

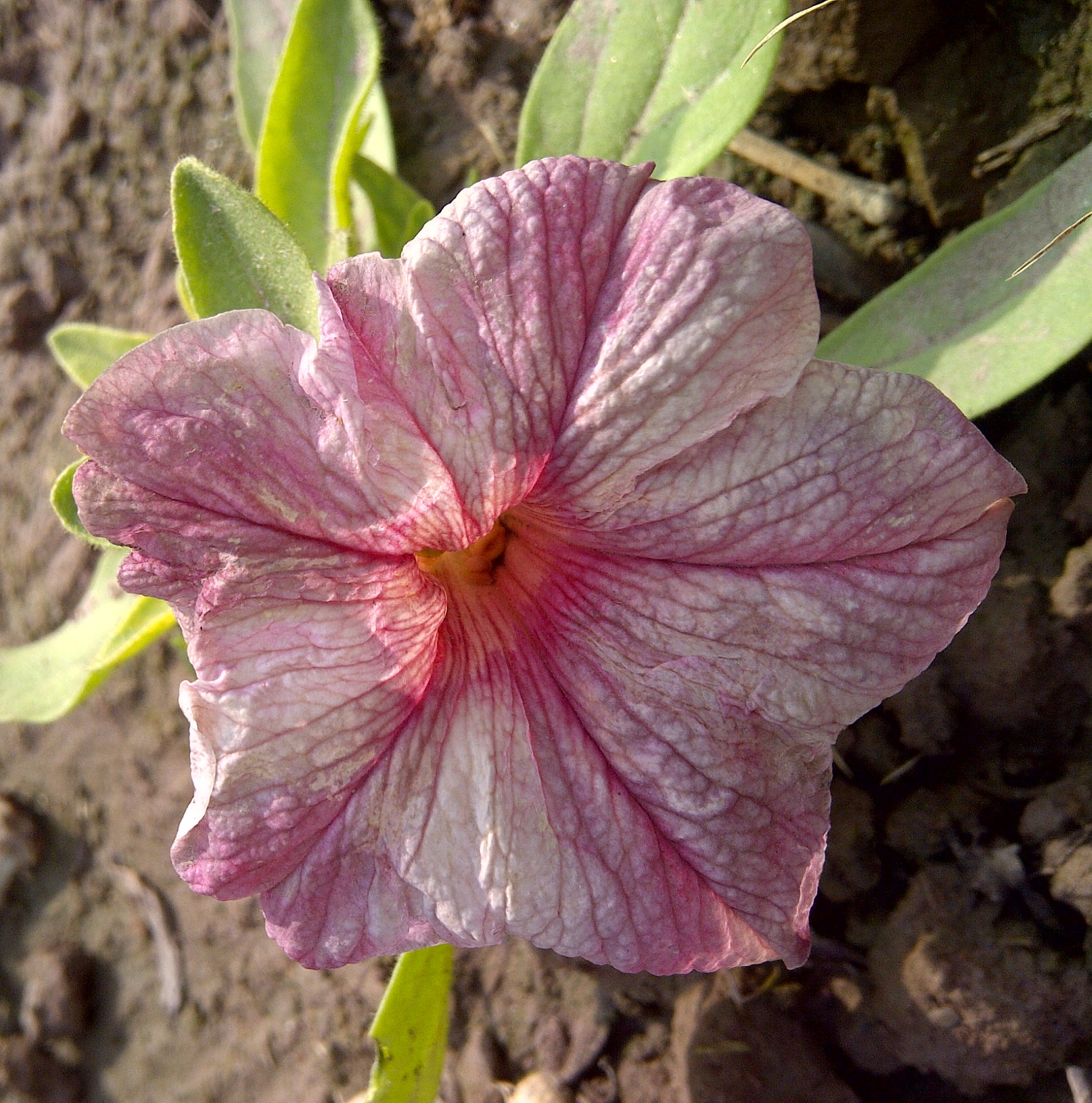
grandiflora Petunia 'Bravo Salmon Veined'

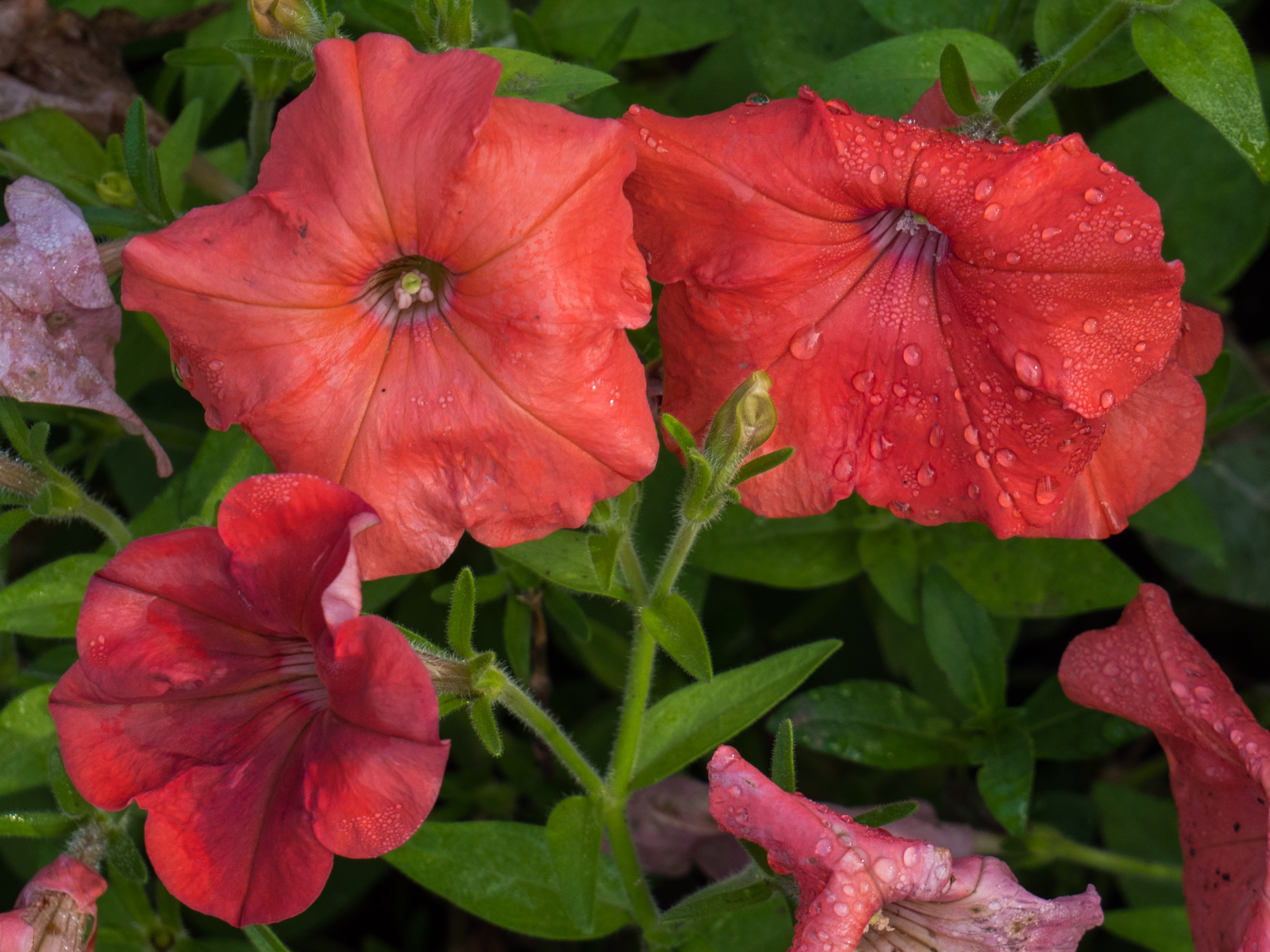
Petunia 'African Sunset', a variety of genetically modified orange petunia
