= Orange petunia =

Genetically modified petunia variety

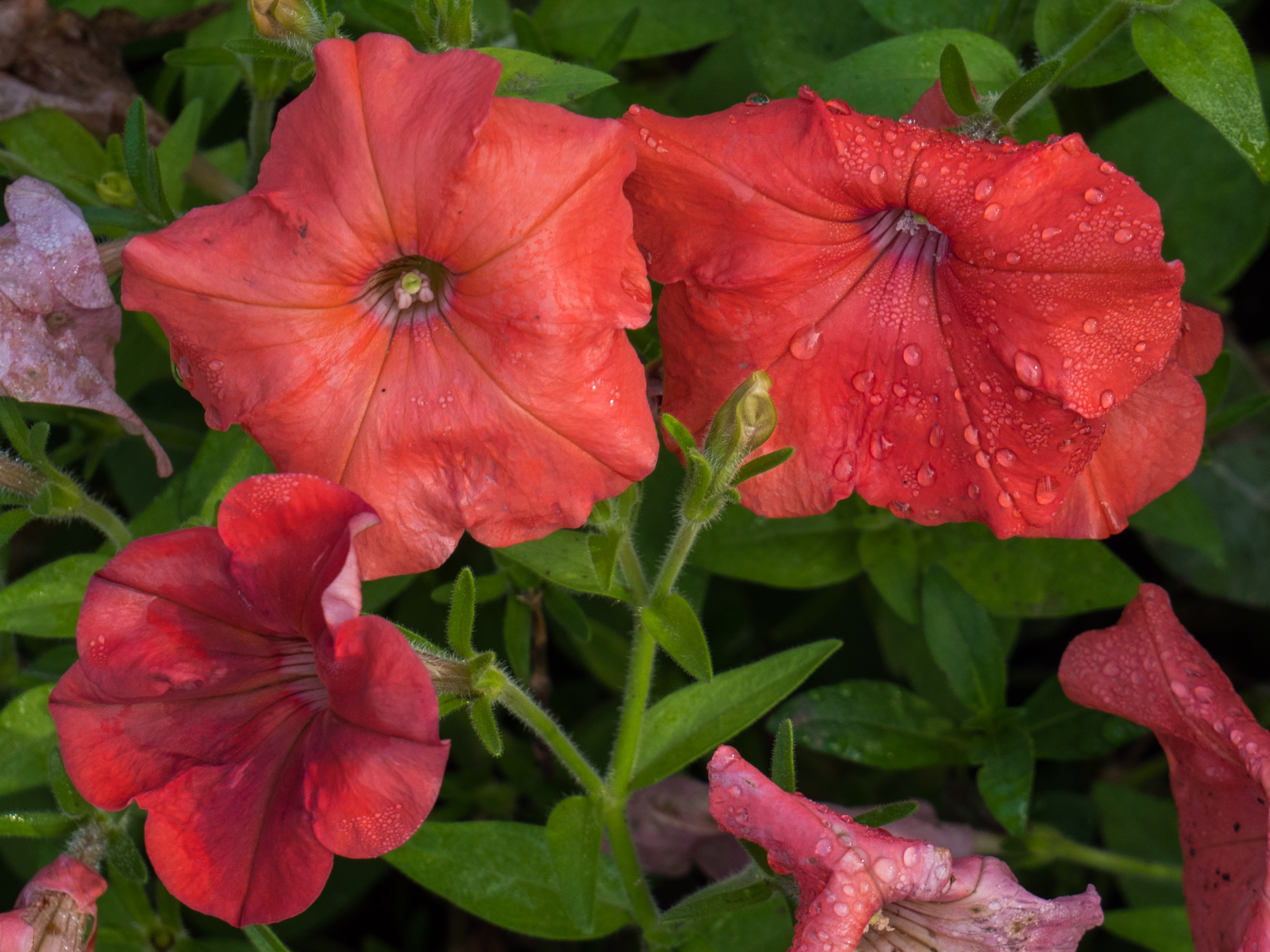
- Identifier(s): A1-DFR petunia
- Plant: Petunia × hybrida
- Mode: Transgenesis
- Trait(s) conferred: Orange flowers
- Genes introduced: A_{1}
- Source: Maize

Orange petunias or A1-DFR petunias are genetically modified organisms which contain a transgene from maize that colors the petunia flowers orange. First created in a 1987 experiment at the Max Planck Institute for Plant Breeding Research in Cologne, the petunias were subsequently released into the wild but were not commercialized. In 2015 orange petunias were discovered in Helsinki by botanist Teemu Teeri, leading to a regulatory response dubbed the petunia carnage of 2017 in which plant sellers were directed to destroy the modified petunia plants rather than sell them. The United States Department of Agriculture approved the sale of orange petunias in the United States in January 2021.

== History ==
Orange petunias were created in 1987 by a team of researchers at the Max Planck Institute for Plant Breeding Research in Cologne, led by geneticist Peter Meyer. In a paper published in Nature the same year, the researchers demonstrated that the insertion of a gene from maize into a petunia would cause the plant to produce pelargonidin, turning its flowers salmon. This was the first modification of flower color using a transgene. The trial of the technology involved the planting of 30,000 such genetically modified petunias, which were the first transgenic plants to be allowed into the field in Germany. According to Meyer, public opinion was strongly against the planting at the time.

Despite the controversy over production of the petunias, a corporation affiliated with seed company Zaadunie acquired a license for the technology, and reported in 1995 that they had created commercially viable orange petunias. Compared to the original petunias, the gene for orange pigment was more consistently expressed in these plants, and the flowers were a vivid orange color. Rogers NK collaborated with Zaadunie to gain approval for a field trial of the petunias in Florida, but according to their originator Peter Meyer, the petunias were never commercialized by any of these companies. Orange petunias were also created through a similar genetic modification from other plant sources, including Gerbera, Calibrachoa, and rose; these were never officially commercialized either.

=== Petunia carnage of 2017 ===
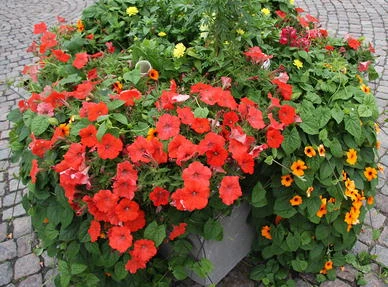
Planter with orange petunias in Helsinki in 2016

In 2015, plant biologist Teemu Teeri noticed orange petunias outside a train station in Helsinki. Teeri knew the history of the modified flowers, and initially believed the orange color of these flowers to be fake. After analyzing a sample he discovered that the DNA of the flowers matched the modification described in the original 1987 paper.

I told too much. I should have asked a hypothetical question.

— Teemu Teeri, referring to his decision to share the existence of the petunias

Teeri notified a regulator with the Finnish Board for Gene Technology of the petunias' presence, a decision which he later told ScienceInsider he regrets. On April 27, 2017, the Finnish Food Safety Authority called for the removal of eight petunia varieties from the market in response to the presence of unauthorized genetically modified petunias. The plants had been imported from Germany and the Netherlands. Because they were not authorized as genetically modified organisms by the European Union, they were required to be identified and destroyed; other European countries began related investigations. The Department for Environment, Food and Rural Affairs in the United Kingdom launched an investigation into their sale, and campaign group GM Freeze warned consumers to avoid the plants.

By May 2, 2017, the Animal and Plant Health Inspection Service (APHIS) of the United States Department of Agriculture (USDA) was performing screenings with plant breeders to search for cauliflower mosaic virus in petunias, as the virus is commonly used to control the expression of transgenes. As of May 24, 2017, APHIS screenings in response to the rediscovery of orange petunias had identified 10 varieties of genetically engineered petunia, along with 21 more that were "implicated as potentially GE". The agency released guidance directing breeders and sellers in the United States to autoclave, bury, compost, incinerate, or use a landfill to dispose of the identified petunia varieties. Michael Firko, director of the Biotechnology Regulatory Services division of APHIS, stated that certain companies may have unknowingly been selling genetically modified petunias for almost a decade; one of his team members had noticed the flowers in a centrepiece at a graduation party in May 2017 but did not take a sample because "she didn't want to destroy the nice floral display".

Regulatory agencies' sudden awareness of the presence of unauthorized genetically modified organisms on the market led to a recall campaign and the destruction of modified petunia plants, causing worldwide economic losses. Orange petunias were essentially removed from the global economic market, with a few exceptions including Canada. The event was dubbed the "petunia carnage of 2017" by photographer Klaus Pichler.

The events leading to the widespread presence of orange petunias are unclear. Tracing the development of the plants is difficult in part because of the complexity of the biotechnology field; Zaadunie was owned by conglomerate Sandoz when the orange petunias were first developed, but Sandoz merged into Novartis in 1996, and Novartis merged its agricultural arm with that of AstraZeneca in 2000 to form Syngenta. An executive at trade group AmericanHort suggested that "somewhere along the line [...] somebody lost sight of the fact that the original color breakthrough in question here had been achieved through genetic modification".

=== Subsequent regulation ===
The USDA stated in 2017 that it would not pursue action against companies which had distributed orange petunias, as it appeared that they had not been aware that the plants were unauthorized genetically modified organisms. In 2021, a petition by German plant supply company Westhoff led the USDA and APHIS to deregulate orange petunias in the United States, allowing their sale.

== Traits ==
=== Genetic ===
Flower coloration from anthocyanins in the ornamental petunia, Petunia × hybrida, is an example of substrate specificity of one enzyme limiting the spectrum of possible products of the pathway. Anthocyanins are water-soluble pigments giving flowers, fruits and sometimes vegetative parts of plants colors ranging from orange and red to blue and purple. Anthocyanins are extensively glycosylated and acylated, which affects their visual properties. At the aglycone level the three most common variants of the molecule are the anthocyanidins pelargonidin, cyanidin and delphinidin, differing by the number of hydroxyl groups (one, two or three, respectively) in the B-ring of the molecule. Hydroxylation takes place at the level of dihydroflavonols in the pathway (possibly earlier in some cases, or later in others) by two enzymes, flavonoid 3'hydroxylase (F3'H) and flavonoid 3'5'hydroxylase (F3'5'H). The enzyme dihydroflavonol reductase (DFR) converts dihydroflavonols to corresponding leucoanthocyanidins, which then are oxidized to anthocyanidins by anthocyanidin synthase (syn. leucoanthocyanidin dioxygenase). In petunia, the DFR enzyme does not react with the simplest precursor (dihydrokaempferol); therefore, the natural range of petunia flower colors lacks orange hues typical to pelargonidin derivatives.

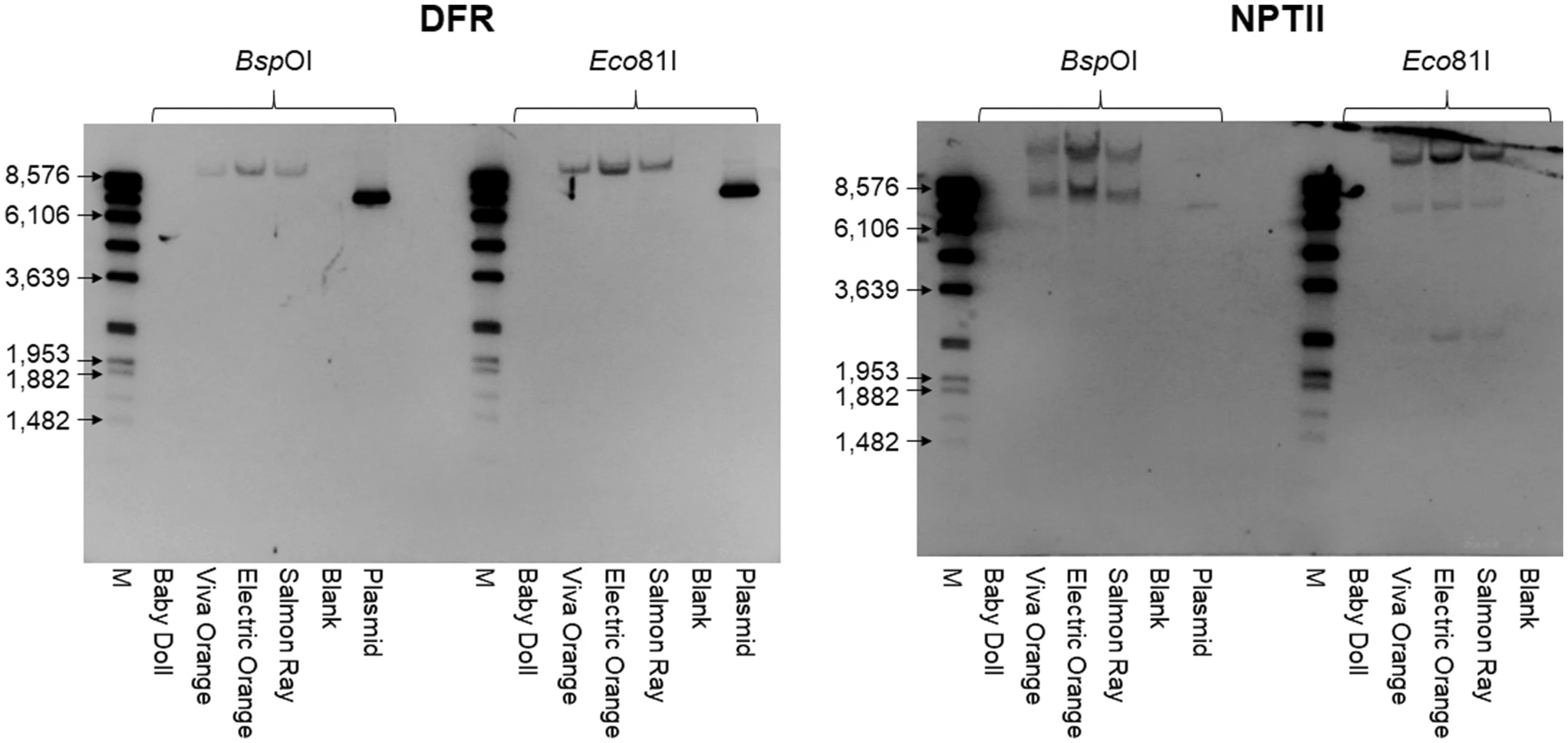
Southern blot analysis of orange GM petunia cultivars 'Viva Orange', 'Electric Orange' and 'Salmon Ray' with probes for the A1-DFR coding sequence (left) and the nptII gene (right).

Orange petunias contain a gene encoding dihydroquercetin 4-reductase from maize, named A_{1} or A1-DFR. This transgenic complementary DNA enables production of orange pelargonidin pigment. One study of three commercially distributed orange petunia varieties found the A_{1} type 2 allele, which matches the modification made in the 1980s and thus suggests a direct relationship between modern orange petunias and the 1987 experiment. Another study noted the presence of the nptII gene, a common marker of selective gene transfer. While some of the initial orange petunia experiments used a DFR gene from plants other than maize, genetic evidence suggests maize as the original source of the DFR gene in present-day orange petunias.

While the original orange petunias had poor horticultural properties, plant breeders were able to introduce the genetic modification into hardier petunia varieties through crossbreeding.

=== Visual ===
While petunias and similar plants do not normally produce orange or bright red flowers because they are genetically unable to synthesize such pigments, genetically modified orange petunias have orange flowers. Flower size and shade vary across different varieties. Some petunia varieties that produce red or purple flowers also carry the gene modification that originally created orange petunias.

=== Interaction with other organisms ===
Orange petunias are not pests and are not considered noxious weeds in the United States, where they are not sexually compatible with any wild plants. The Finnish Food Safety Authority noted after their investigation that while the petunias were not authorized for cultivation in the European Union, they "do not cause any risk to people or the environment".

== Varieties ==
Orange petunia varieties carry commercial names including 'African Sunset', 'Cascadias Indian Summer', and 'Bonnie Orange' as well as 'Salmon Ray', 'Viva Orange', and 'Electric Orange'.
