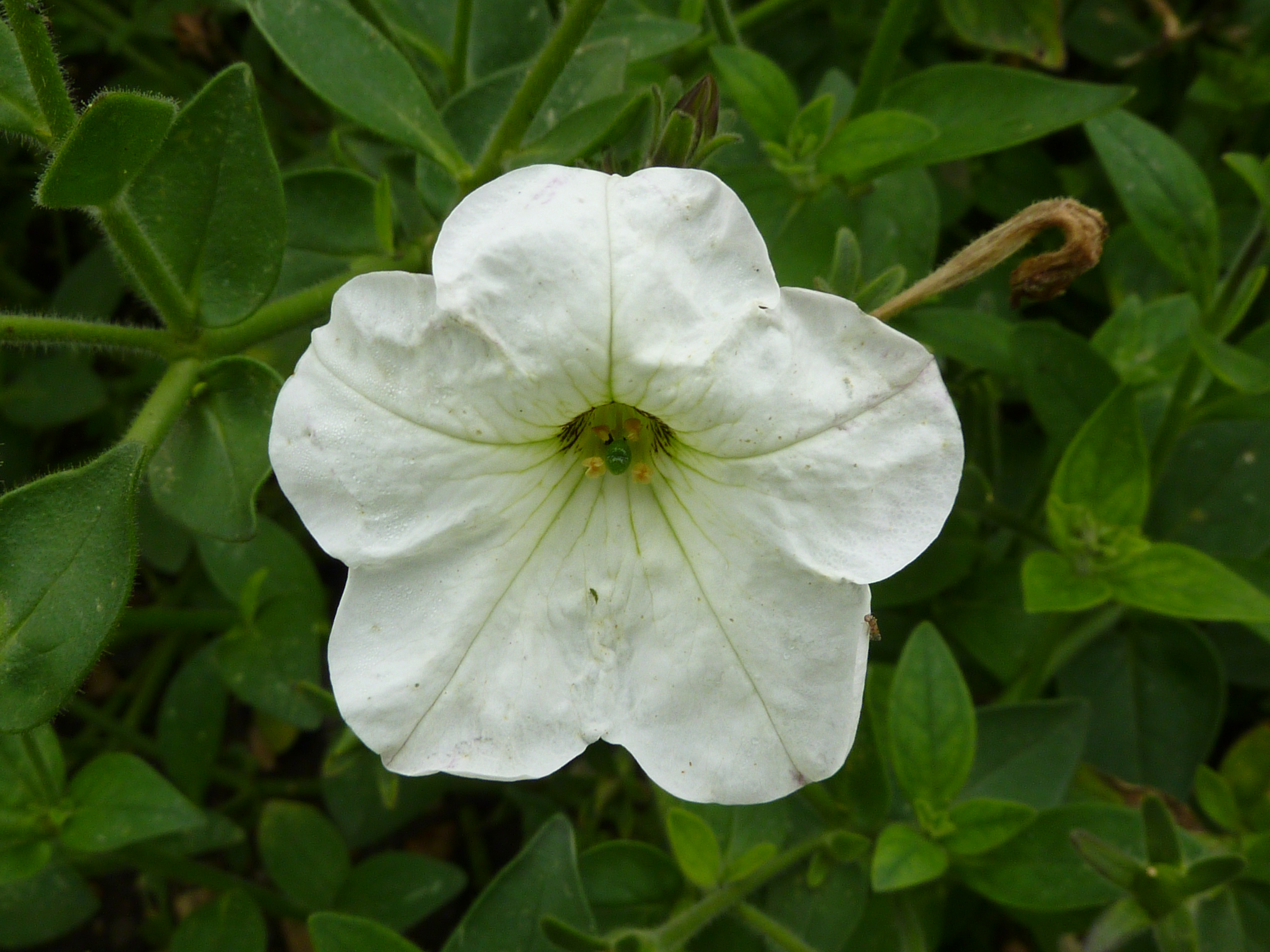

Scientific classification
- Kingdom: Plantae
- Clade: Tracheophytes
- Clade: Angiosperms
- Clade: Eudicots
- Clade: Asterids
- Order: Solanales
- Family: Solanaceae
- Genus: Petunia
- Species: P. axillaris

Binomial name
- Petunia axillaris (Lam.) Britton, Stern & Poggenb.

Synonyms
- Nicotiana axillaris Lam. Petunia nyctaginiflora Jussieu; Petunia parodii Steere

= Petunia axillaris =

Species of flowering plant

Petunia axillaris, the large white petunia, wild white petunia or white moon petunia, is an annual herbaceous plant in the family Solanaceae, genus Petunia. It is native to temperate South America comprising southern Brazil, parts of Argentina and Uruguay. The plant's flowers, the only white ones found in the Petunia genus, are 3 to 7 cm long. The commonly-grown garden petunia is a hybrid of P. axillaris and P. integrifolia.

== Subspecies ==
P. axillaris has three subspecies: P. a. axillaris, P. a. parodii, and P. a. subandina. P. a. axillaris and P. a. parodii are found in the flat parts of the Pampas, while P. a. subandina is found in the highlands near the Andes.
