= Lycopersicon =

Obsolete genus of flowering plants

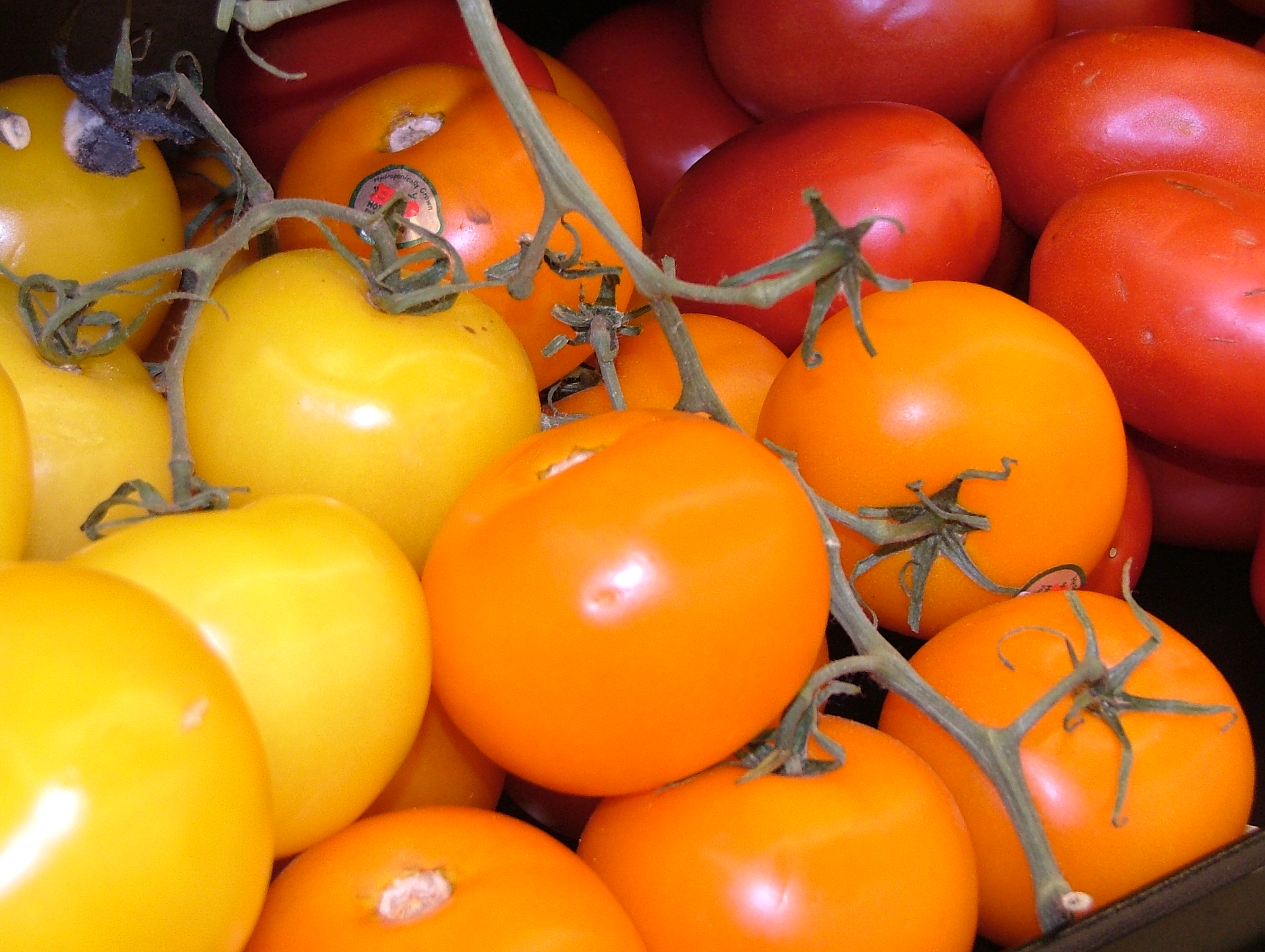
Fruit of three cultivars of the common tomato (Solanum lycopersicum)

Lycopersicon was a genus in the flowering plant family Solanaceae (the nightshades and relatives). It contained about 13 species in the tomato group of nightshades. First removed from the genus Solanum by Philip Miller in 1754, its removal leaves the latter genus paraphyletic, so modern botanists generally accept the names in Solanum. The name Lycopersicon (from Greek λυκοπέρσικον meaning "wolf peach") is a reference to German folklore about members of the nightshade family being used to summon werewolves, and still used by gardeners, farmers, and seed companies. Collectively, the species in this group apart from the common cultivated plant are called wild tomatoes.

Cladistic analysis of DNA sequence data confirms Lycopersicon as a clade that is part of a lineage of nightshades also including the potato (S. tuberosum). If it is desired to continue use of Lycopersicon, it can be held as a section inside the potato-tomato subgenus whose name has to be determined in accordance with the ICBN.

== Selected species ==
Former specific names are cited if they have significantly changed when moving to Solanum, are:

Arcanum group

- Solanum arcanum Peralta (= Lycopersicon peruvianum var. humifusum C.H.Mull.)
- Solanum chmielewskii (C.M.Rick, Kesicki, Fobes & M.Holle) D.M.Spooner, G.J.Anderson & R.K.Jansen
- Solanum neorickii D.M.Spooner, G.J.Anderson & R.K.Jansen (= Lycopersicon parviflorum C.M.Rick, Kesicki, Fobes & M.Holle)

Lycopersicon group

- Solanum cheesmaniae (L.Riley) Fosberg (= Lycopersicon peruvianum var. parviflorum Hook.f.)
- Solanum galapagense S.C.Darwin & Peralta (= Lycopersicon cheesmaniae f. minor (Hook.f.) C.H.Mull., L. cheesmaniae var. minor (Hook.f.) D.M.Porter, L. esculentum var. minor Hook.f.)
- Solanum lycopersicum L. – Tomato, cherry tomato etc. (= Lycopersicon cerasiforme, L. lycopersicum and many others)
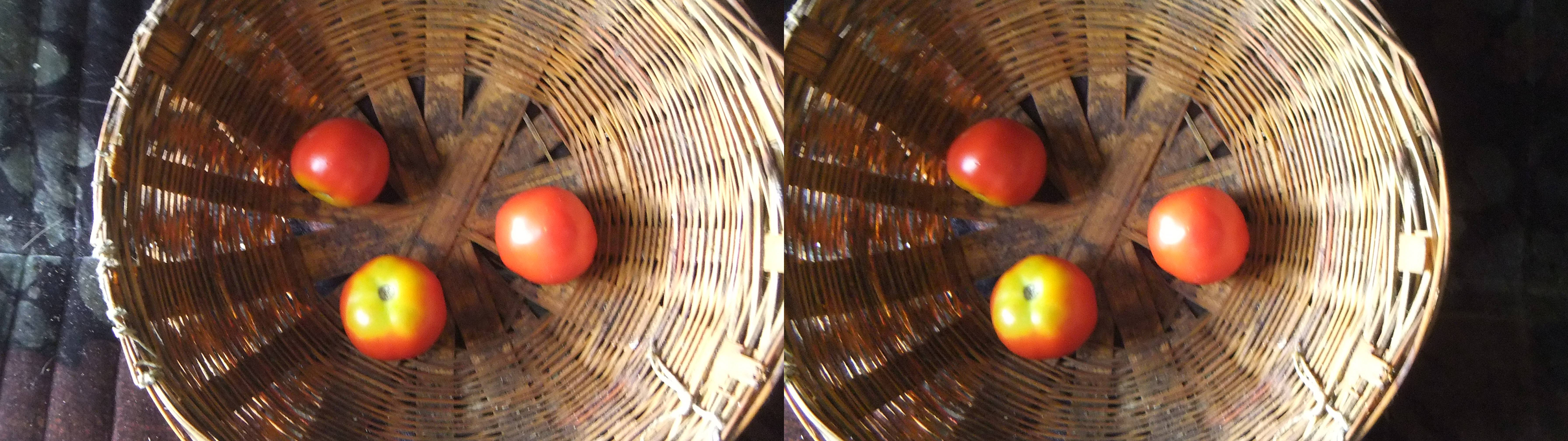
- Tomato 3D Virtual Reality image
- Solanum pimpinellifolium L. – Currant tomato (= Lycopersicon esculentum ssp. intermedium Luckwill, L. esculentum ssp. pimpinellifolium (L.) Brezhnev in Zhukovskii, L. esculentum var. racemigerum (Lange) Brezhnev in Zhukovskii, L. pissisi Phil., L. racemiforme Lange, L. racemigerum Lange)

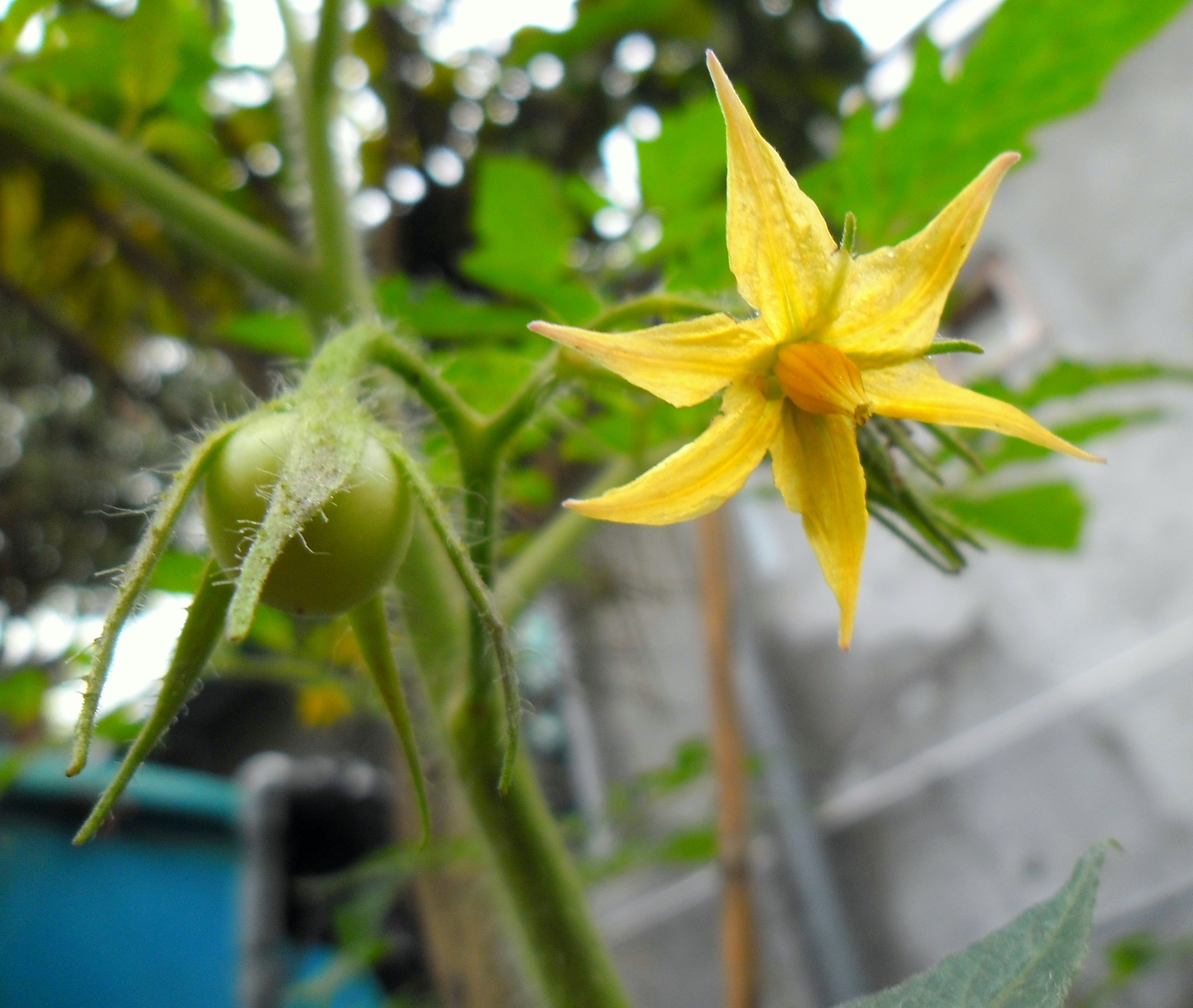
Lycopersicon (Tomato) flowers, and developing fruit

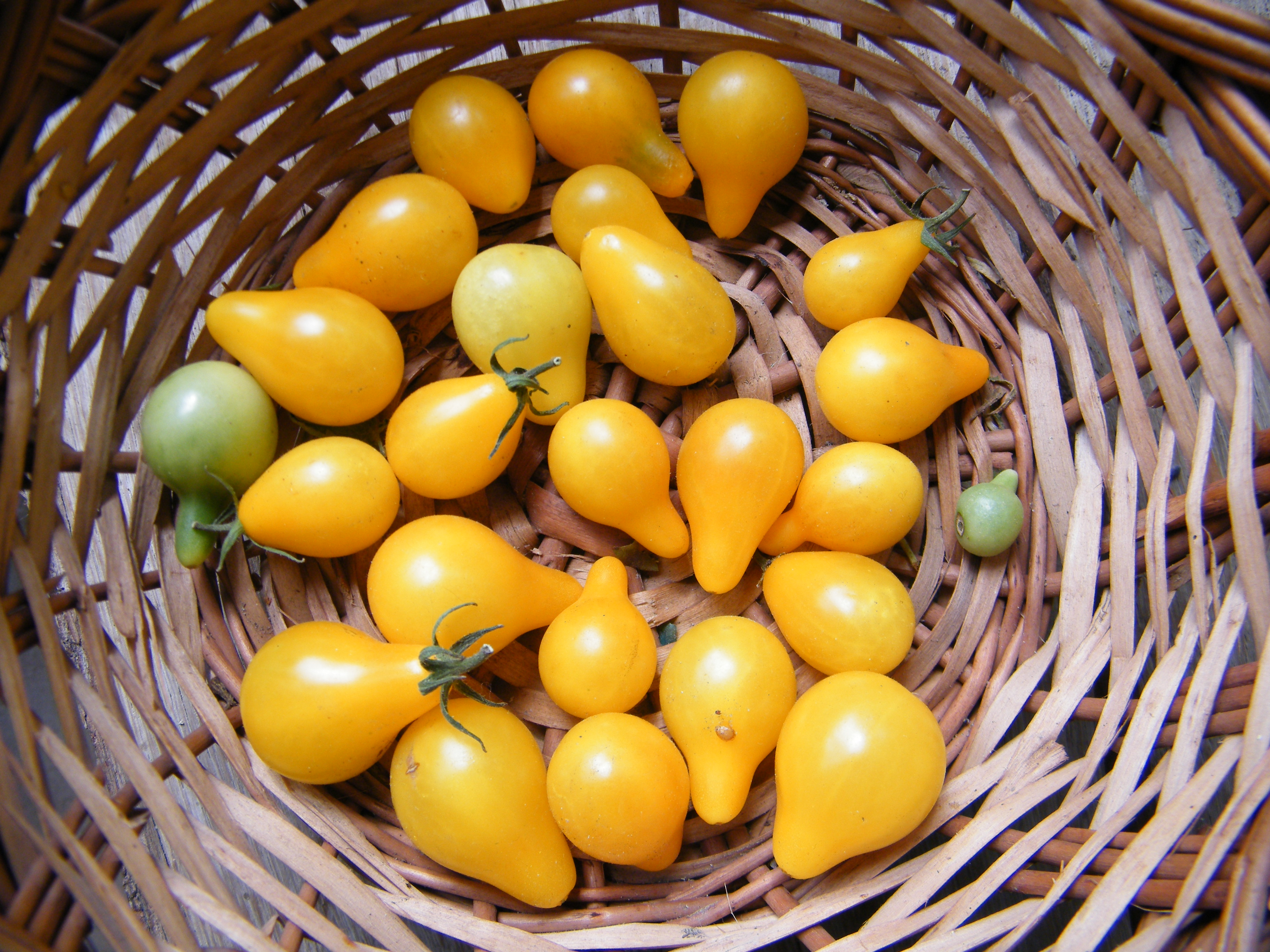
"Yellow Pearshaped" tomatoes

Eriopersicon group

- Solanum chilense (Dunal) Reiche (= Lycopersicon atacamense Phil., L. bipinnatifidum Phil., L. peruvianum ssp. puberulum (Phil.) Luckwill, L. puberulum Phil.)
- Solanum corneliomulleri J.F.Macbr. (= Lycopersicon glandulosum C.H.Mull.)
- Solanum habrochaites S.Knapp & D.M.Spooner (= Lycopersicon agrimoniifolium Dunal in DC., L. hirsutum Dunal)
- Solanum huaylasense Peralta
- Solanum peruvianum L. – Peruvian nightshade (= Lycopersicon commutatum (Spreng.) Roem. & Schult., L. dentatum Dunal, L. regulare Dunal)

Neolycopersicon group

- Solanum pennellii Correll

== Other "wild tomatoes" ==
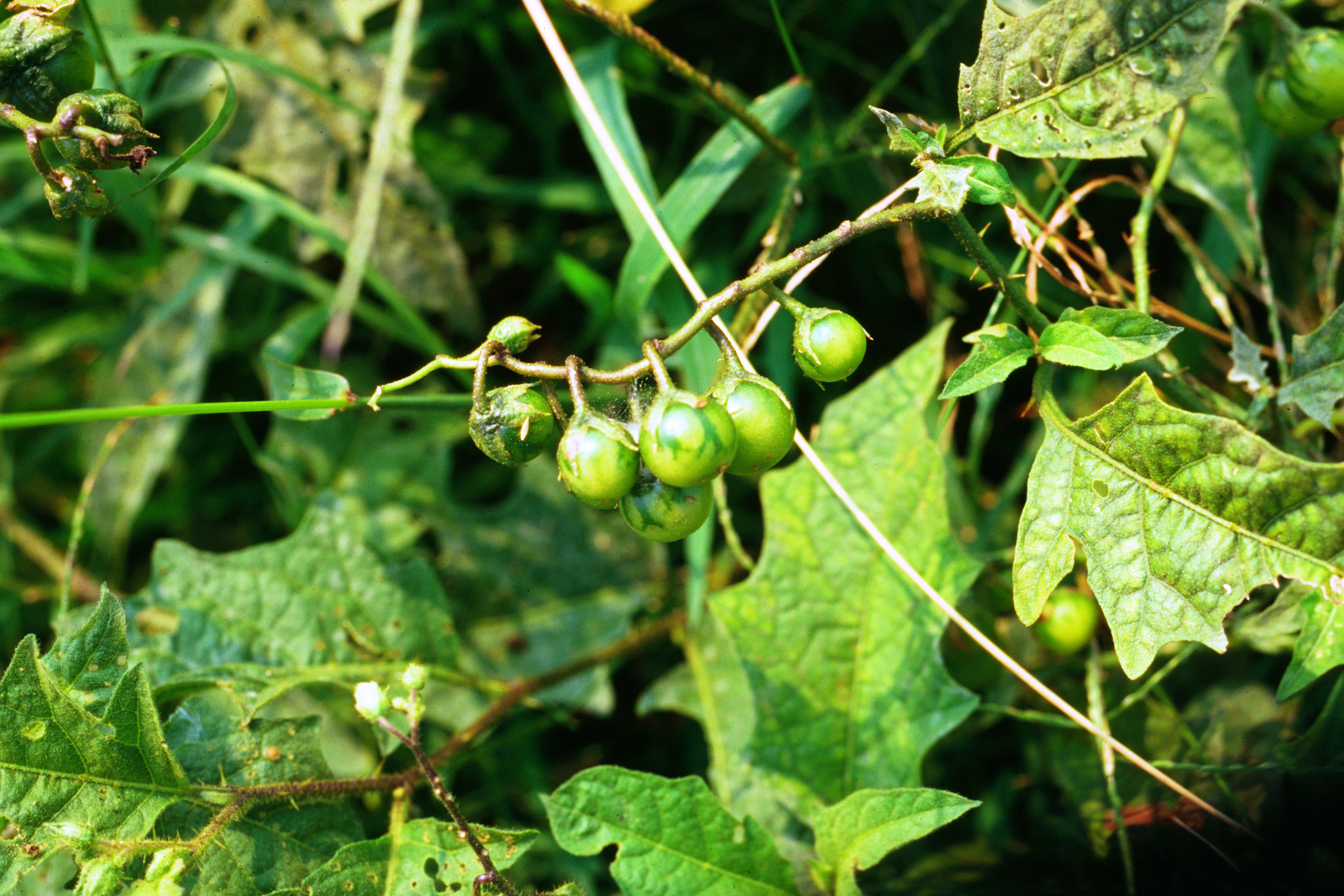
Fruiting branch of Solanum carolinense. These "wild tomatoes" are poisonous.

Colloquially, wild tomato is used for several unrelated Solanum species with tomato-like fruit or leaves. The term is inaccurate and may be dangerous, as some of these species may be fatally poisonous:

- Physalis angulata (Cut-leaved groundcherry)
- Solanum carolinense (Carolina horsenettle)
- Solanum quadriloculatum (a "bush tomato" of Australia)
- Solanum wallacei (Wallace's nightshade)

and others.
