= Solanum peruvianum =

Scientific classification
- Kingdom: Plantae
- Clade: Tracheophytes
- Clade: Angiosperms
- Clade: Eudicots
- Clade: Asterids
- Order: Solanales
- Family: Solanaceae
- Genus: Solanum
- Species: S. peruvianum

Binomial name
- Solanum peruvianum L.

Synonyms
- List: Antimion tomentosum Raf.; Lycopersicon commutatum Roem. & Schult.; Lycopersicon dentatum Dunal; Lycopersicon glandulosum C.H.Müll.; Lycopersicon peruvianum (L.) Mill.; Lycopersicon peruvianum subsp. commutatum (Roem. & Schult.) Luckwill; Lycopersicon peruvianum var. dentatum (Dunal) Dunal; Lycopersicon peruvianum subsp. typicum Luckwill; Lycopersicon regulare Dunal; Scubulon incanum Raf.; Solanum chrysobotrys Walp.; Solanum commutatum Spreng.

Species of flowering plant

Solanum peruvianum (syn. Lycopersicon peruvianum) is a species of wild tomato in the family Solanaceae. It is native to the Galápagos Islands, Ecuador, Peru, and northern Chile, and has been introduced to California. Some authorities consider it to be a member (and namesake) of a species complex, with the other members being Solanum corneliomuelleri, Solanum huaylasense, and Solanum arcanum.
