= Oishii =

American strawberries vertical farming company

- Type: Private
- Founded: 2016
- Headquarters: Jersey City, New Jersey, U.S.
- Key people: Hiroki Koga (CEO); Brendan Somerville (COO)

Oishii is an American vertical farming company that grows strawberries and cherry tomatoes. Founded in 2016 by Hiroki Koga and Brendan Somerville in Kearny, New Jersey, Oishii produces three Japanese cultivars of strawberries, of which their Omakase berry, launched in 2018 for grocers and restaurants in New York City, is the most famous. Originally selling for $50 per a tray of eight Omakase strawberries, the company cut prices to $20 per tray in 2022. The company's most expensive strawberry is the Omakase "Connoisseur Grade", which in 2026 sells online for the New York area only at a price of $50 for a tray of six berries, i.e. $8.33 per berry.

In 2022, Oishii opened a 74,000-square-foot (6,900 m^{2}) vertical farm in Jersey City, New Jersey and moved its headquarters there. In 2024, the company opened a 240,000-square-foot (22,000 m^{2}) vertical farm in Lopatcong Township, New Jersey, which is totally solar powered. The first farm, in Kearny, now focuses on propagating plants for the other farms.
