= Santorini tomato =

Greek variety of cherry tomato

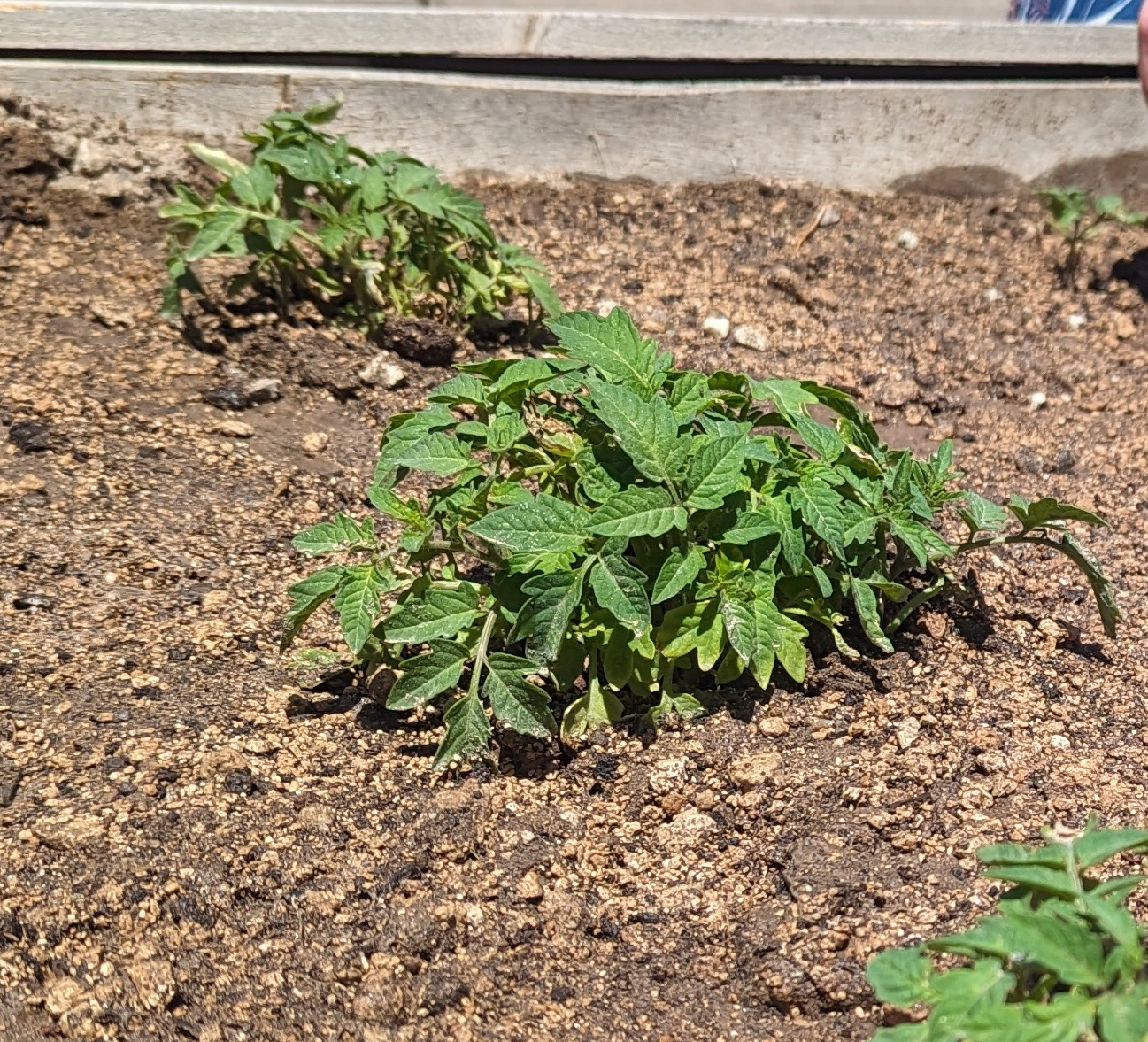
Plants at Tomato Industrial Museum D. Nomikos

The Santorini tomato 'τοματάκι Σαντορίνης' (tomataki Santorinis) is a variety of cherry tomato from Santorini, Greece. Santorinis have a deep red color and have firm, not particularly moist flesh with a high seed content. They are known for their high carbohydrate content and a sweet, strongly acidic taste. They have a round, slightly flattened shape and weigh 15–27 grams. They often have pronounced flutes, especially those growing lowest on the plant. The fruits generally ripen in 80–90 days.

== Growing Conditions ==
Santorini is a volcanic island, and its characteristic soil and weather define the character of Santorini tomatoes. The island receives less than 370mm of rainfall annually, so the crops must rely on dew and the high, 71%, humidity throughout the year. The soil contains no nitrogen naturally, and fertilizers - which would compensate for this - are not usually used. On the other hand, the soil contains sodium, which is hygroscopic, and can absorb moisture from the air and traps it. The water stress and limey, alkaline soil largely account for the selective breeding that developed this tomato.

== History ==
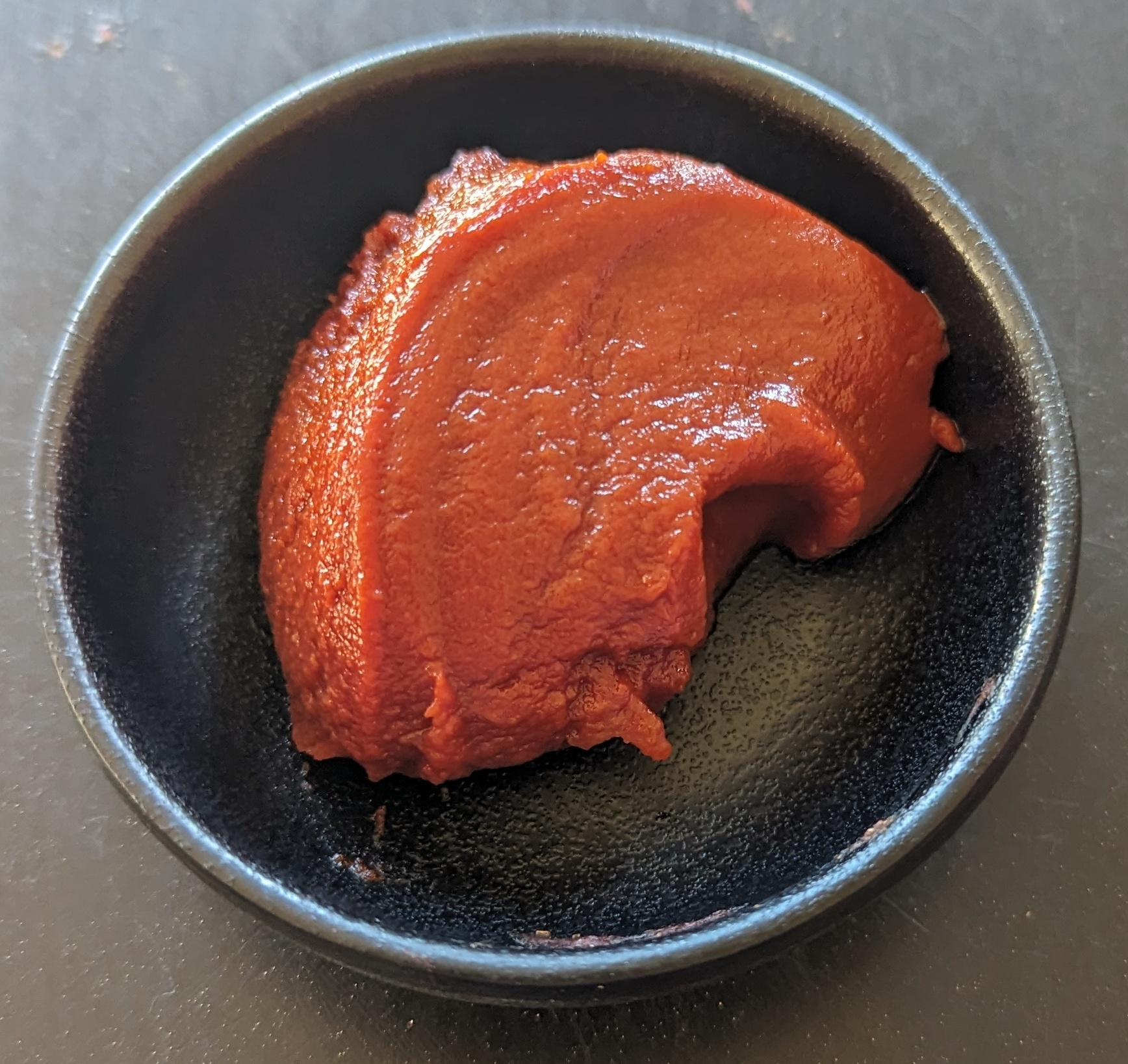
Santorini tomato paste

It is widely believed that an abbot of the Capuchin monastery in Ano Syros (Cyclades) brought the first cherry tomatoes to Greece in 1818. The variety of tomato began to be regularly cultivated in 1875. By the 1900s, 20,000 acres of tomatoes were regularly being harvested in Santorini. Tomato production has declined since this time due to various environment, political, and tourism issues.

The Santorini tomato has been protected with an official designation of origin since June 13, 2013. A museum, the Tomato Industrial Museum D. Nomikos, covers the history of Santorini tomato cultivation and processing.

== See also ==
- List of tomato cultivars
- Cherry tomato
