= Margrit Selke =

Specialist in biodynamic agriculture (1900–2004)

Margrit Selke (1900–2004) was a specialist in biodynamic agriculture who did research with Dr.Ehrenfried Pfeiffer. From the early 1960s, until her retirement at the age of 97, she was the maker of the Pfeiffer BD Compost Starter and Field Spray 1. Along with Peter Dukich, Harris Porter and Erika Sabarth, she was considered as one of the "Three Musketeers" of Bio-dynamic Composting. All the "Musketeers" were noted for their remarkable longevity. Only Harris Porter died in his 80s, while Peter Dukich reached 94, Erica Sabarth, 84 and Margrit Selke, 105.

The exceptionally prolific Selke Biodynamic Cherry Tomato was named after her.

Emil Bock, in his book The Three Years wrote that the seed and plant of this unusual species contains forces evoking "the cosmic sphere of sunlit clouds, air and wind..."
