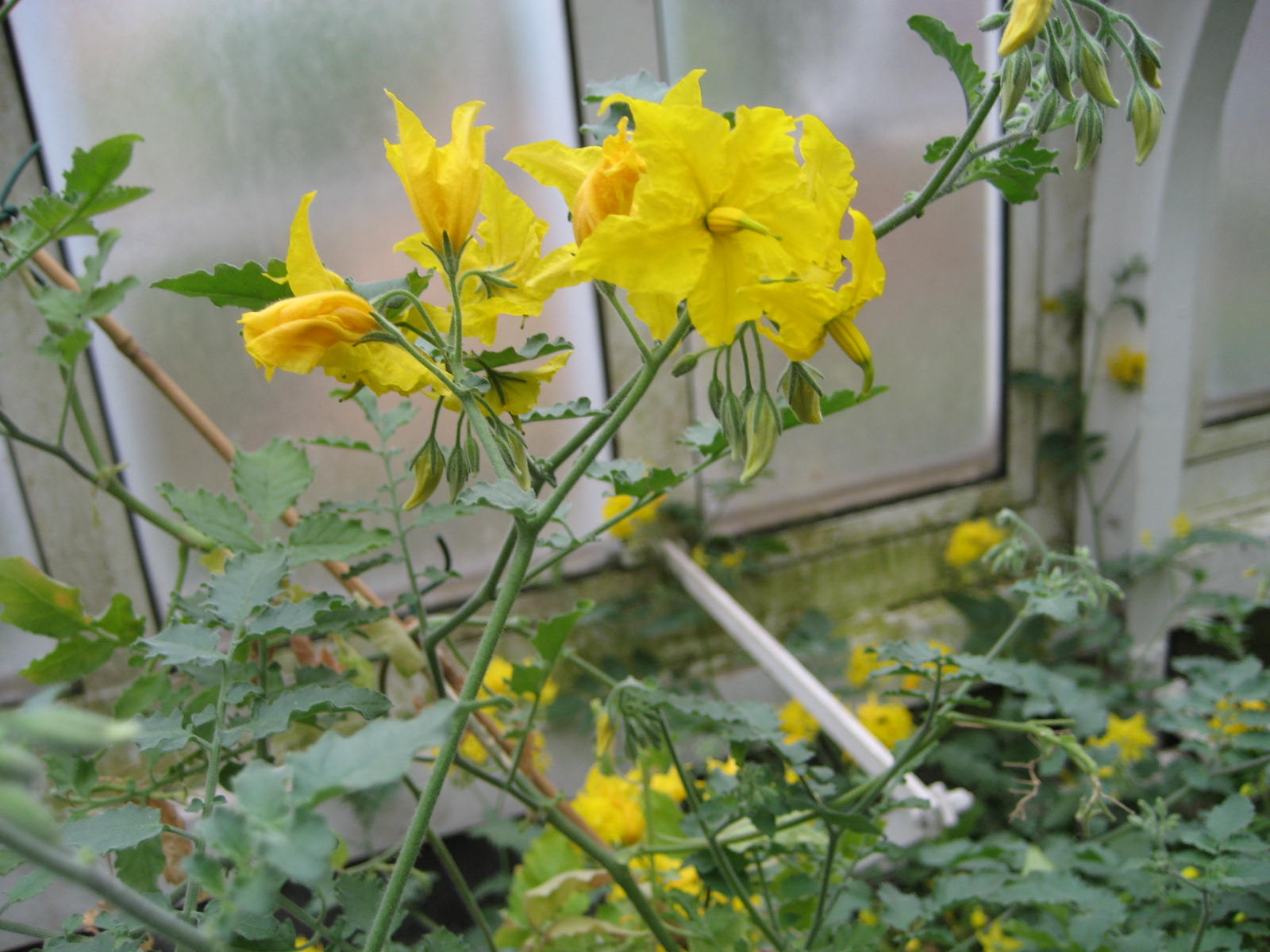

Conservation status
- Least Concern (IUCN 3.1)

Scientific classification
- Kingdom: Plantae
- Clade: Tracheophytes
- Clade: Angiosperms
- Clade: Eudicots
- Clade: Asterids
- Order: Solanales
- Family: Solanaceae
- Genus: Solanum
- Species: S. chilense

Binomial name
- Solanum chilense (Dunal) Reiche
- It is native to northern Chile, Galápagos, and Peru

Synonyms
- Lycopersicon chilense Dunal; Lycopersicon atacamense Phil.; Lycopersicon bipinnatifidum Phil.; Lycopersicon peruvianum subsp. puberulum (Phil.) Luckwill; Lycopersicon puberulum Phil.

= Solanum chilense =

Species of flowering plant

Solanum chilense is a plant species from the "tomato" subgenus Lycopersicon within the nightshade genus Solanum.

== Description ==
=== Vegetative characteristics ===
Solanum chilense is an erect or decumbent, perennial, 0.5–1.5 m tall, and 1–4 m wide herb with a woody base. The grayish stems become woody at the base and reach a diameter of 8 to 12 millimetres (0.31 to 0.47 in). The dense, velvety coat consists of white, single row, non-glandular trichomes up to 0.5 mm in length and occasional short-row, glandular trichomes with four or achtzelligen heads.

The sympodial units have two (rarely three) leaves. The internodes are 1–2 (rarely 5) cm long. The leaves are broken imparipinnate, (often only 5 to) 7 to 13 (rarely to 20) cm long and (rarely 2) 2.5 to 6.5 (rarely to 10) cm wide. They are greyish green. The coat is similar to the stem, but with less glandular trichomes.

The sheath consists of five to seven pairs of bulk leaves which are narrowly elliptical in shape, a broad-pointed to pointed tip, and inclined to appear sessile.

=== Generative characteristics ===
The often terminal, 10–12-flowered inflorescence bears pedicellate, yellow, self-incompatible flowers with 5 petals. The anther tube is straight. The stigma is capitate. The globose, 1 cm wide, green, inedible fruits have white hairs.

=== Cytology ===
It is a diploid species. The chromosome count is n = 12.

== Taxonomy ==
It was first described as Lycopersicum chilense Dunal by Michel Félix Dunal in 1852. It was placed into the genus Solanum L. as Solanum chilense (Dunal) Reiche by Karl Friedrich Reiche in 1910. It is placed into the section Solanum sect. Lycopersicon.

=== Etymology ===
The specific epithet chilense means from Chile.

== Distribution and habitat ==
It is native to northern Chile, Galápagos, and Peru at altitudes of 0–3300 m above sea level. It is adapted to the harsh environmental conditions and salinity of the Atacama Desert. They grow in extremely dry, rocky areas and in coastal deserts. The flowers and fruits appear consistently throughout the year, but there is a noticeable increase in flowering between September and October.

== Conservation ==
The IUCN conservation status is Least Concern (LC).

== Use ==
It is used in plant breeding because it is resistant to disease, drought, salt, and cold.
