= Tomato Industrial Museum D. Nomikos =

Museum in Santorini, Greece

Coordinates: 36.3390°N 25.4327°E

- Museum logo, 2024

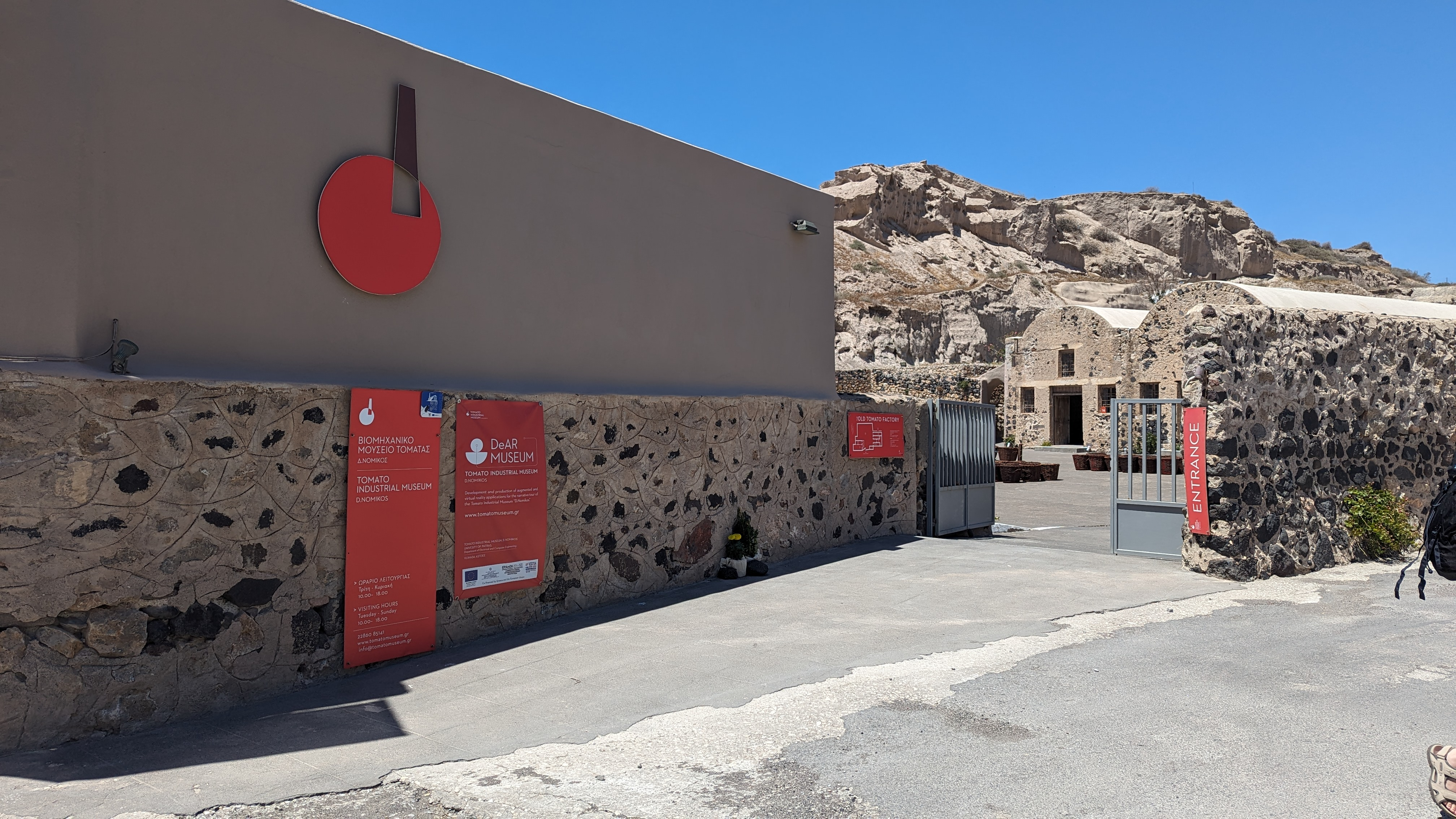
- Tomato Industrial Museum D. Nomikos, 2024
- Established: 2014
- Collections: Industrial history
- Website: tomatomuseum.gr/en/

Tomato Industrial Museum "D. Nomikos" (Greek: Βιομηχανικό Μουσείο Τομάτας "Δ. ΝΟΜΙΚΟΣ") is an industrial museum in Vlychada on the island of Santorini in Greece. It was founded as a tomato paste factory in 1945 but closed in 1981. In 2014, it reopened as a museum to preserve the remaining buildings, objects and stories connected to Santorini's tomato processing past. It also includes digital exhibits featuring augmented reality and holographic fans. The Nomikos family, as of 2016, still operates tomato processing plants in Bulgaria, Greece and Turkey.

== History ==
Dimitros Nomikos established his first tomato processing business in 1915 in Messaria. By 1922, he established "one of the first canneries in the Balkans" in Monolithos. His son George Nomikos founded the Vlychada tomato processing plant in 1945, naming it after his father.

Prior to a volcanic eruption in 1950, Santorini was known as "tomato island". Tomatoes were a significant crop on the island, which over centuries had developed a variety suited to the volcanic soils and needing little water. This variety had a thin skin, thick flesh and strong taste, qualities ideal for making tomato paste. Nine factories operated on the islands until the late 1950s. In 1956, the site was flooded and subjected to an earthquake. During its busiest periods, 3500 baskets of tomatoes were processed on a daily basis. The factory closed in 1981 due to a reduction in tomato cultivation on the island. As of 2016, the Nomikos family continued to run similar processing plants in Bulgaria, Greece and Turkey.

In 2014, the site re-opened as an industrial museum, recording the history of specialist tomato processing on the island. The museum is part of a wider organisation called Santorini Arts Factory.

== Collections and interpretation ==
Holographic fans used as interpretation, with the human eye people are seen on the rotating blades. May 2024.

The collection includes machinery and tools, as well as archival materials and oral histories, recorded for the museum's opening. The oldest machinery on display dates to 1890. The site also includes boilers previously used to generate electricity for tomato paste production; sea water had once been pumped in from the nearby bay.

Museum exhibits cover the cultivation of the tomato, processing and production of the tomato paste product. The museum has invested in digital technologies, including holographic fans, augmented reality and speech to text support for people who have impaired hearing. These bring new voices to the interpretative framework and help demonstrate complex industrial processes. A tomato paste, of the kind the factory would have produced was, as of 2016, available to buy from the gift shop.

== Legacy ==
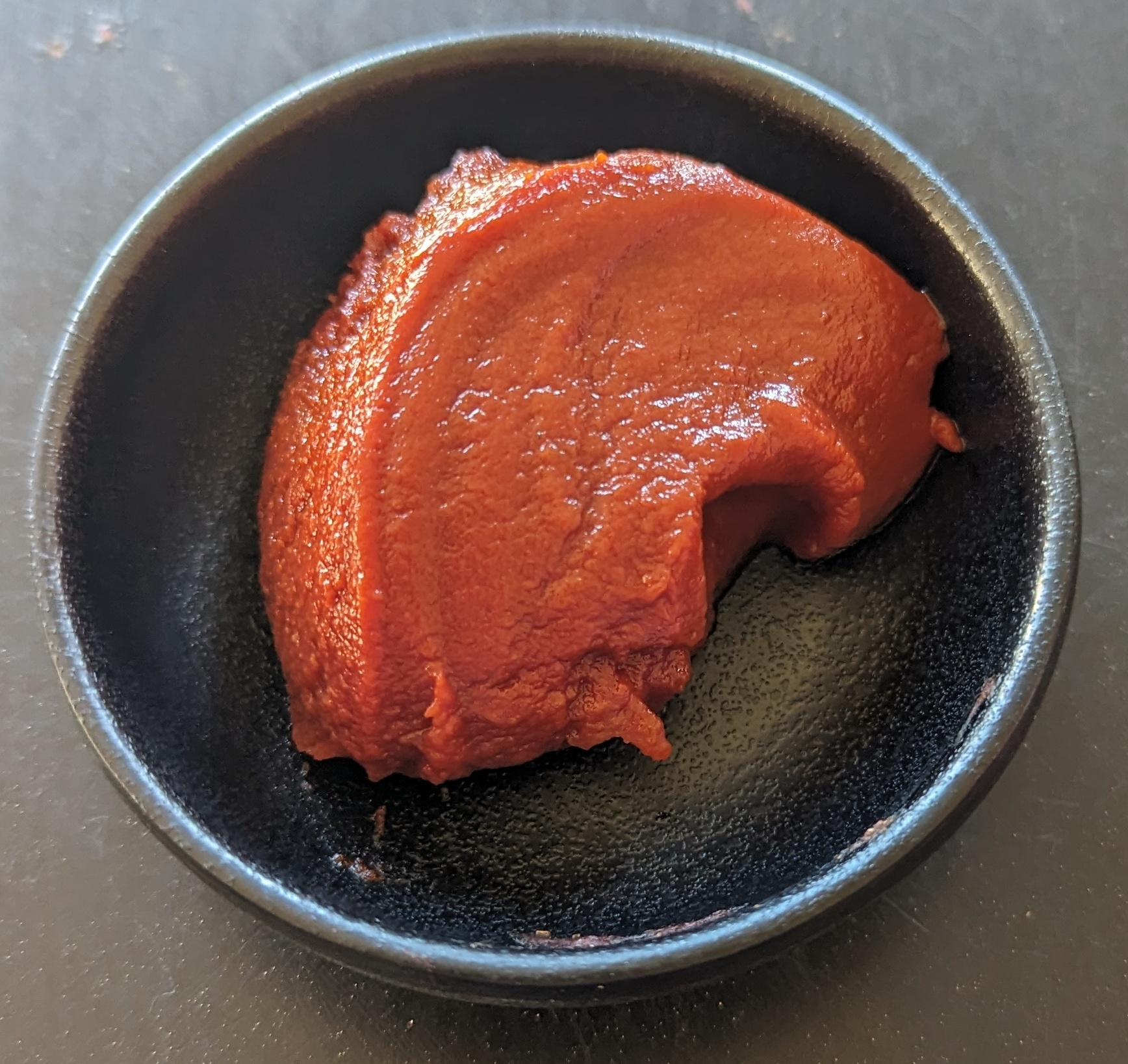
Santorini tomato paste

In 2017 The Independent described how visitors encounter "a taste of the cultivation, processing and production of the island's famous triple-concentrated tomato paste (often named as the best in the world), blended with the local history and culture of the island". Gastro Obscura described how the museum has "immortalised" the "heyday" of tomato production on the island.

== Gallery ==
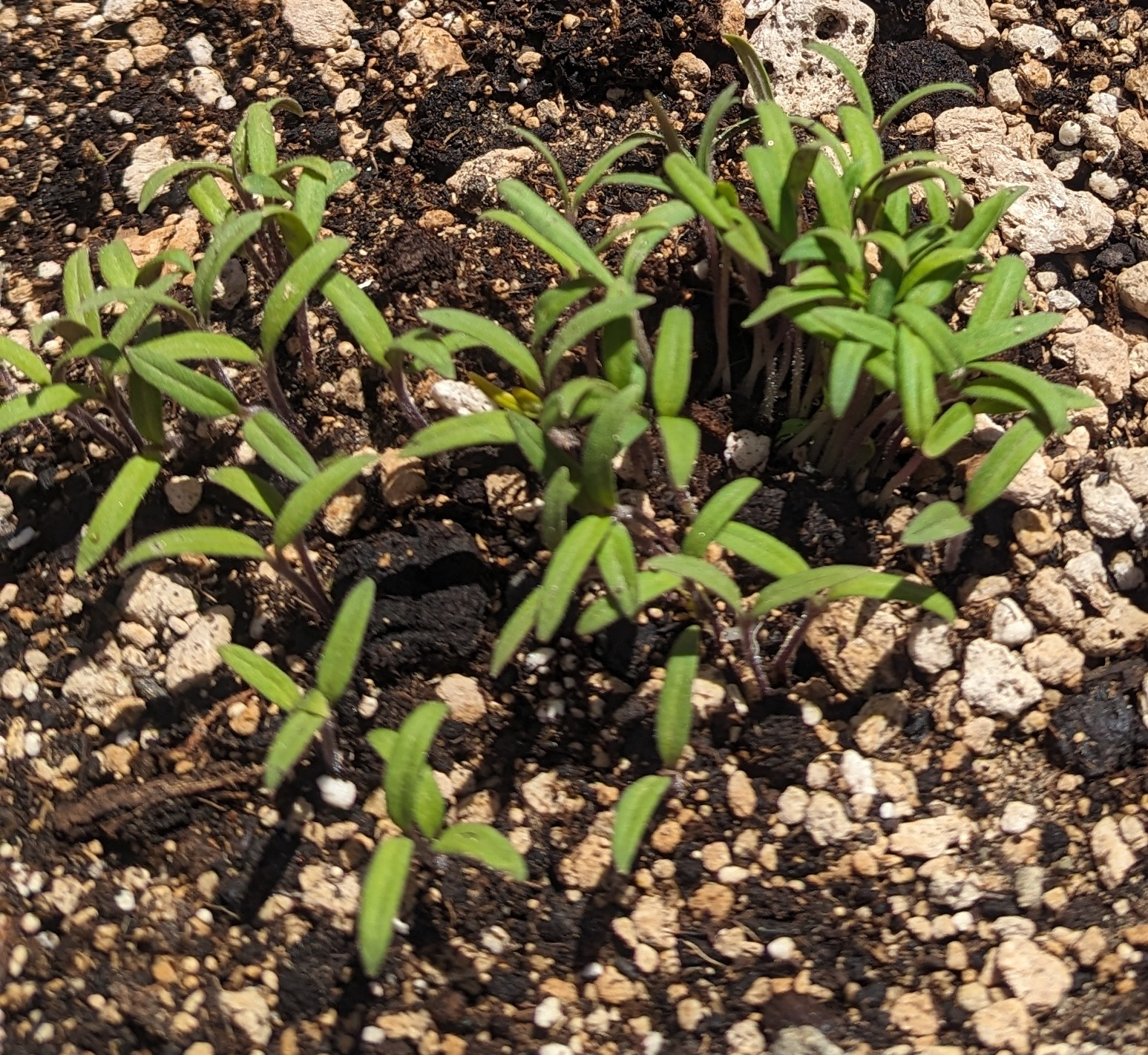
Santorini tomato seedlings at the museum

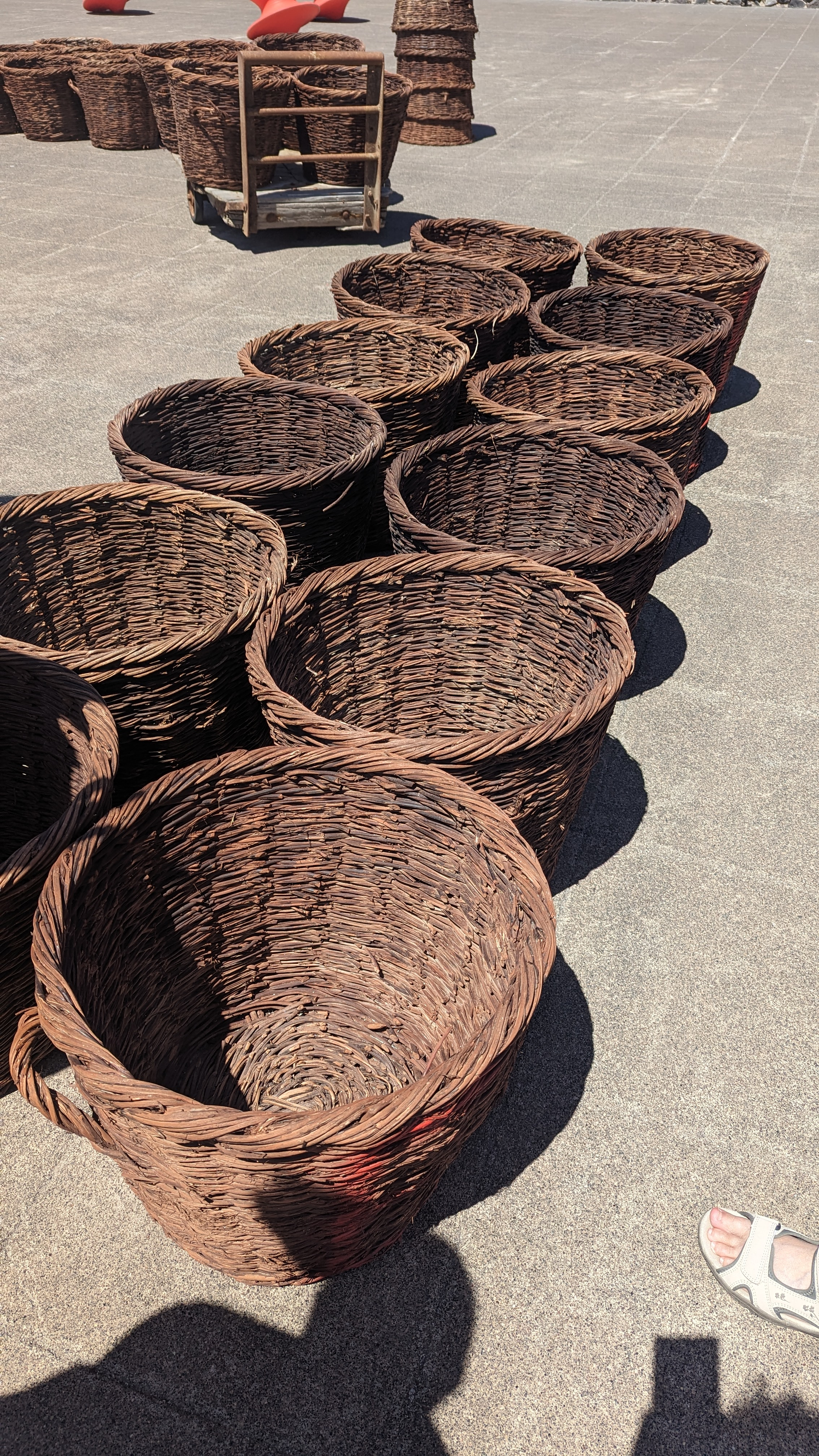
Baskets used to deliver tomatoes

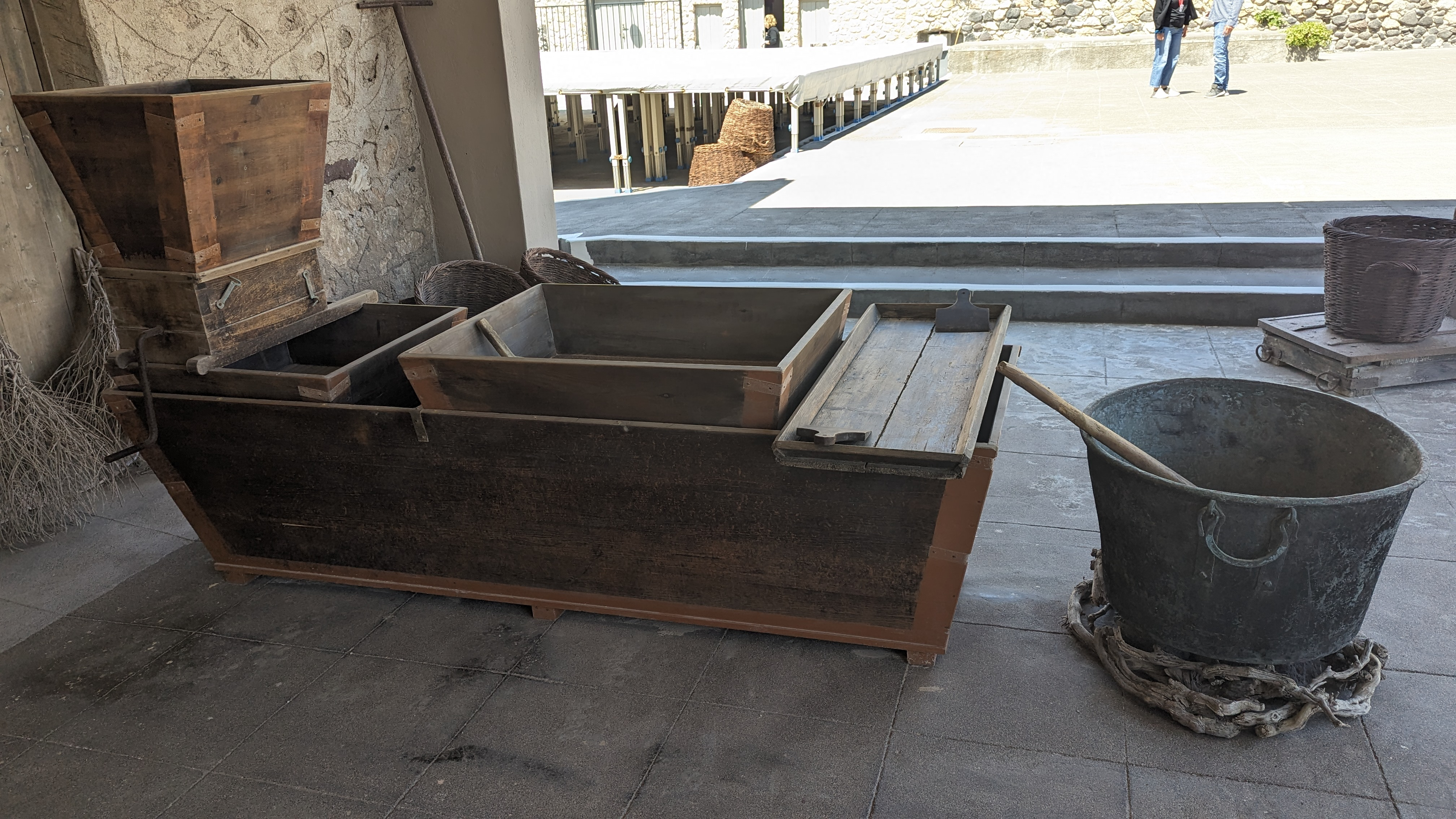
Processing the tomato paste by hand

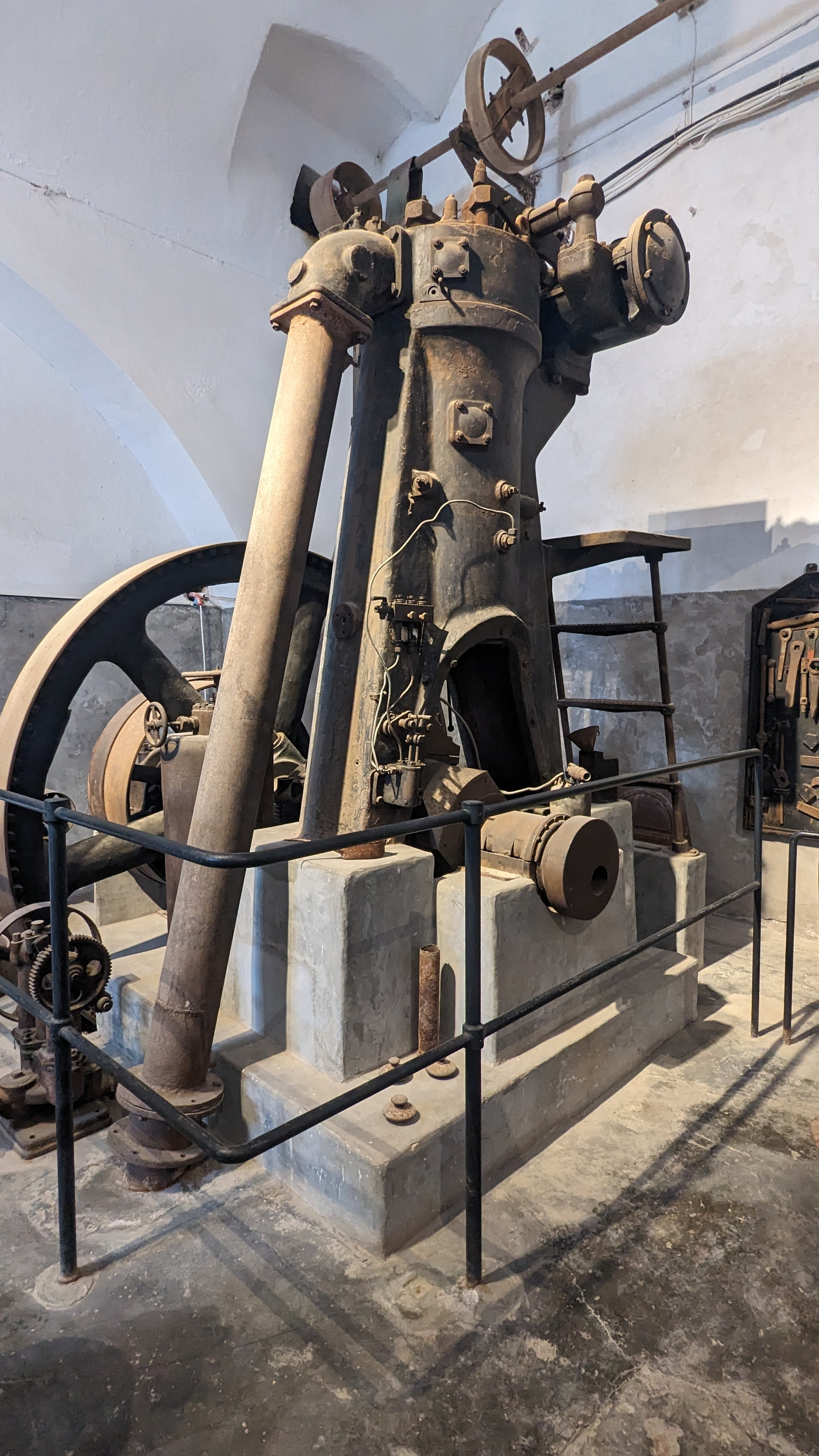
Engine used to produce electricity for the factory

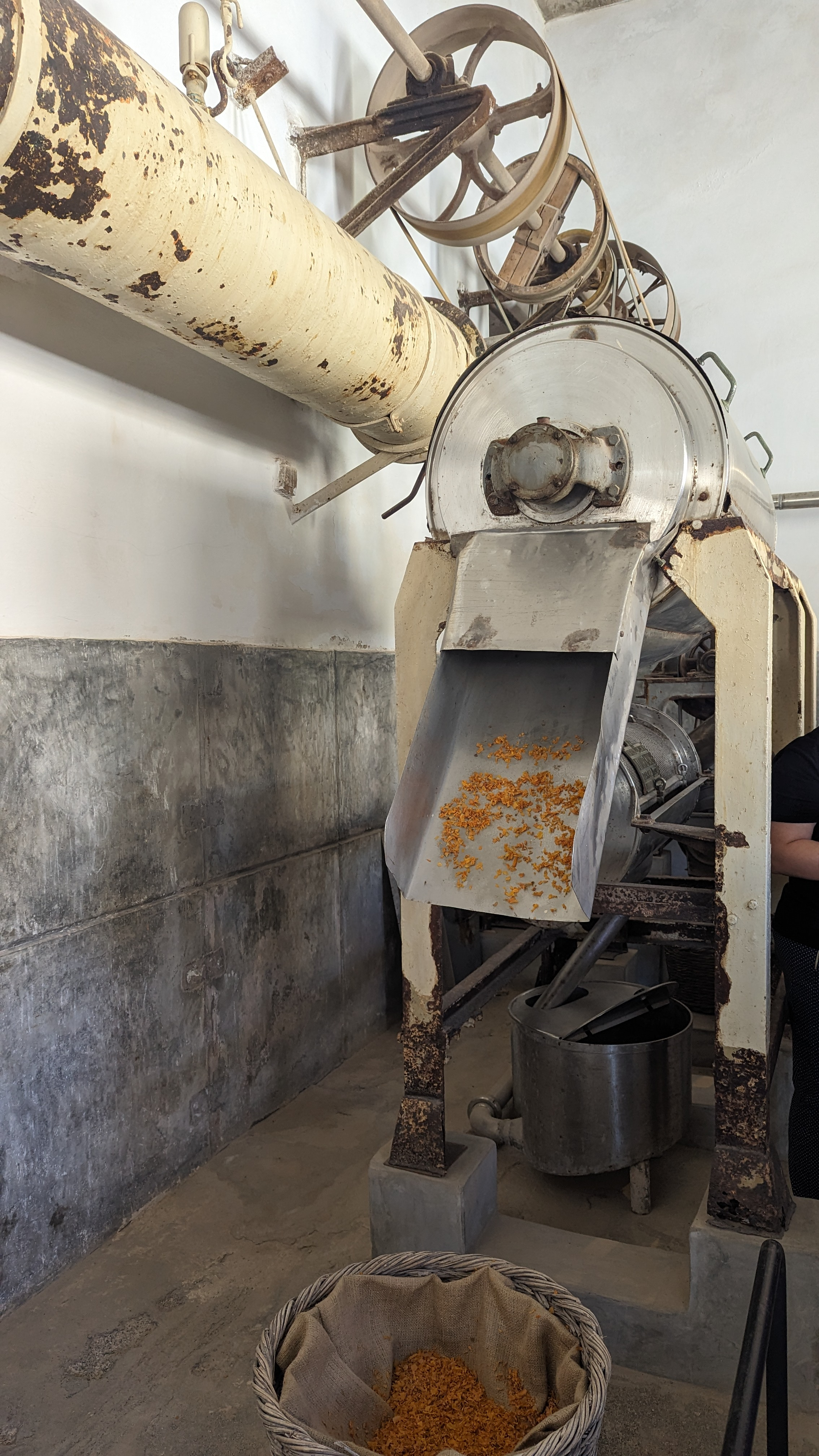
Tomato processing machinery

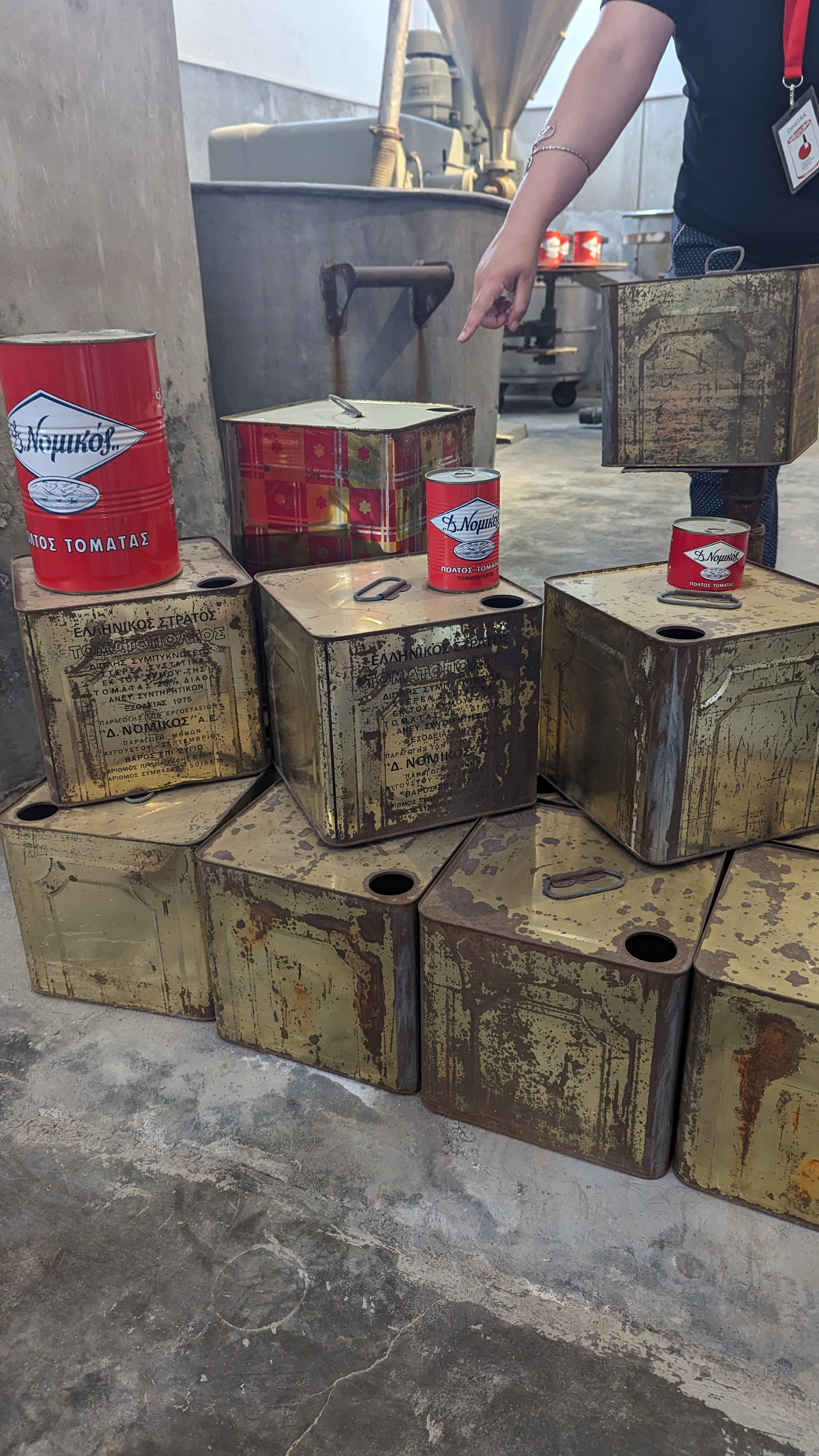
A range of tomato paste cans

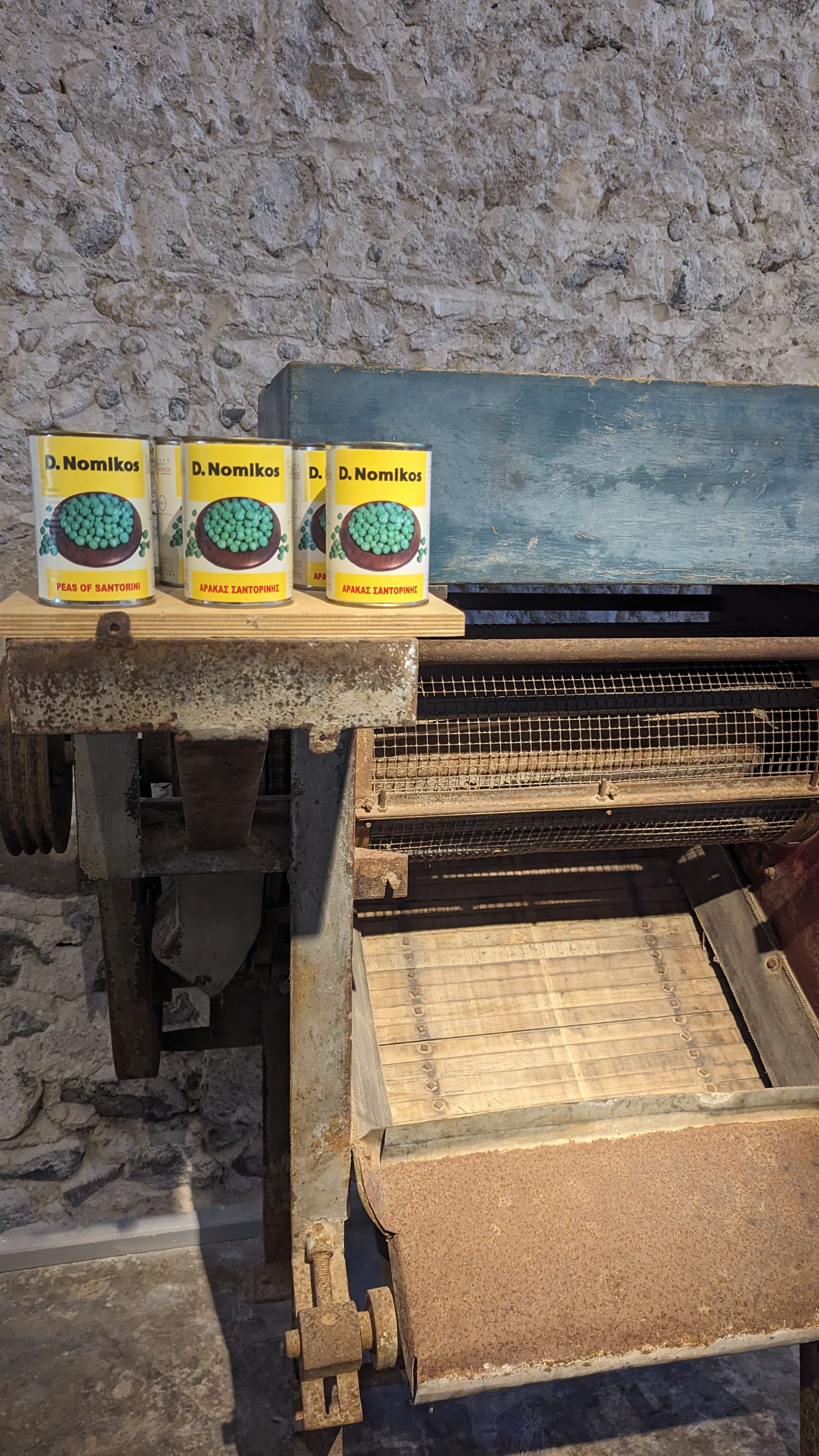
The factory also canned peas.

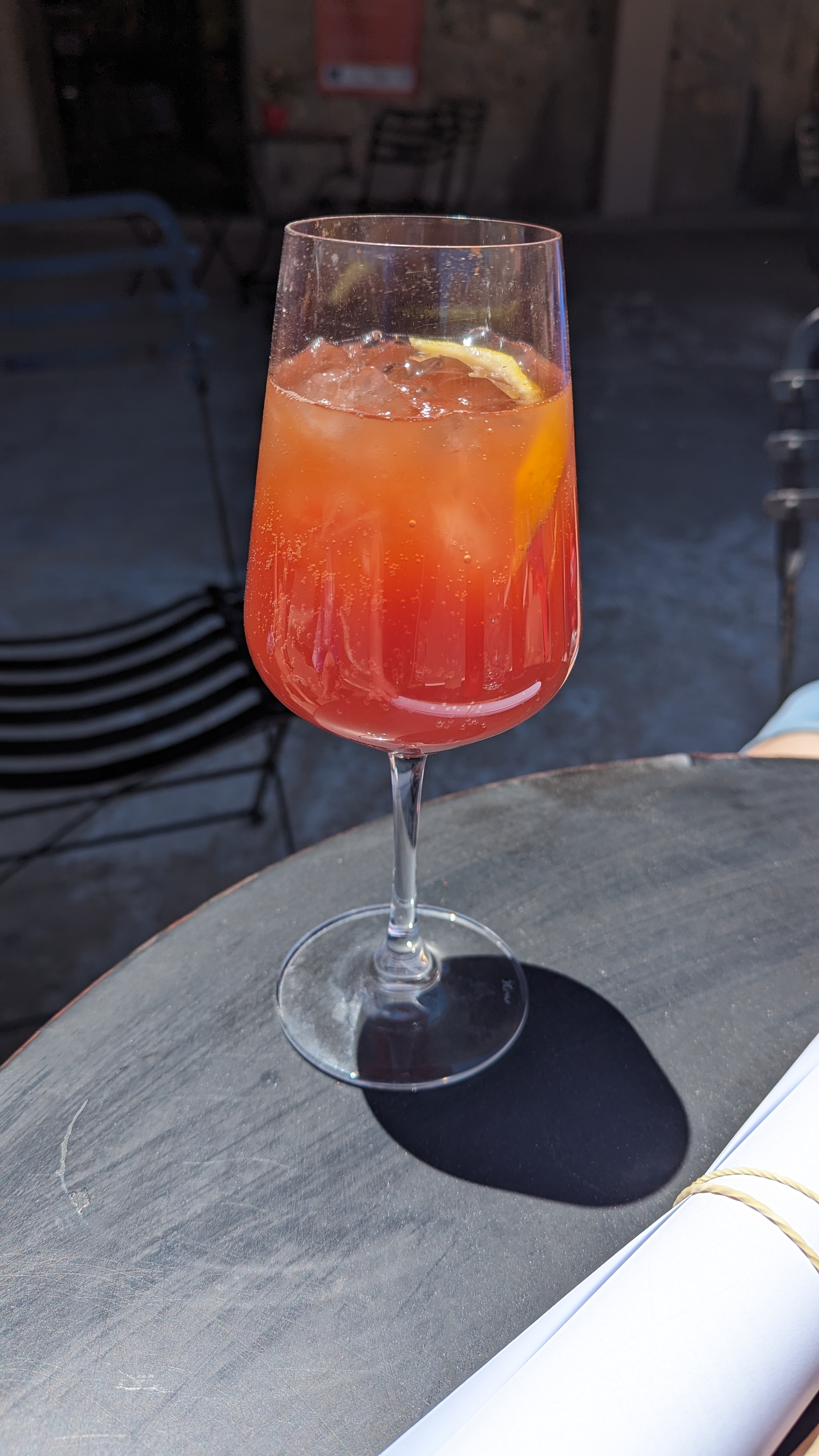
Tomato juice and tonic at the museum's bar
