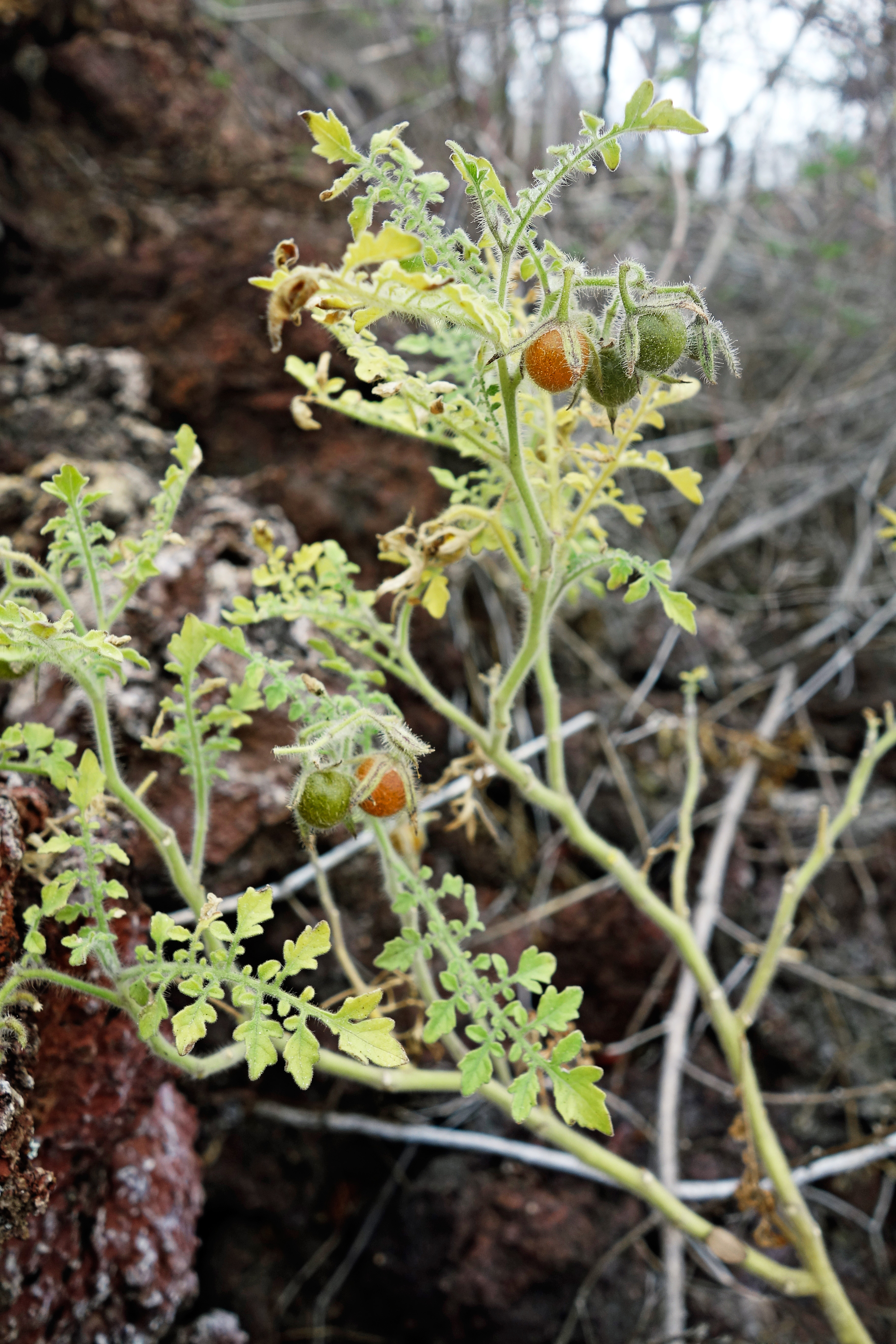
- Galapagos tomato (Solanum galapagense) in fruit, on Santiago Island.

Scientific classification
- Kingdom: Plantae
- Clade: Tracheophytes
- Clade: Angiosperms
- Clade: Eudicots
- Clade: Asterids
- Order: Solanales
- Family: Solanaceae
- Genus: Solanum
- Species: S. galapagense

Binomial name
- Solanum galapagense S.C.Darwin & Peralta

= Solanum galapagense =

Species of flowering plant

Solanum galapagense is a wild tomato in the family Solanaceae section Lycopersicon and is one of two tomato species endemic to the Galápagos Islands, 500 miles west of Ecuador.

Solanum galapagense and the similar Solanum cheesmaniae are recognized as distinct species, although S. cheesmanii is the one most commonly called the Galapagos tomato. The fruit of S. galapagense are smaller and hairier, with a distinct orange color. The foliage of S. galapagense is also more bushy and smelly.

== Distribution and habitat ==
The species occurs mostly on coastal lava within range of sea spray, to within one meter of the high tide mark. It is strongly salt tolerant. Its range can also extend inland, such as on the volcanic slopes of the islands of Isabela and Fernandina.
