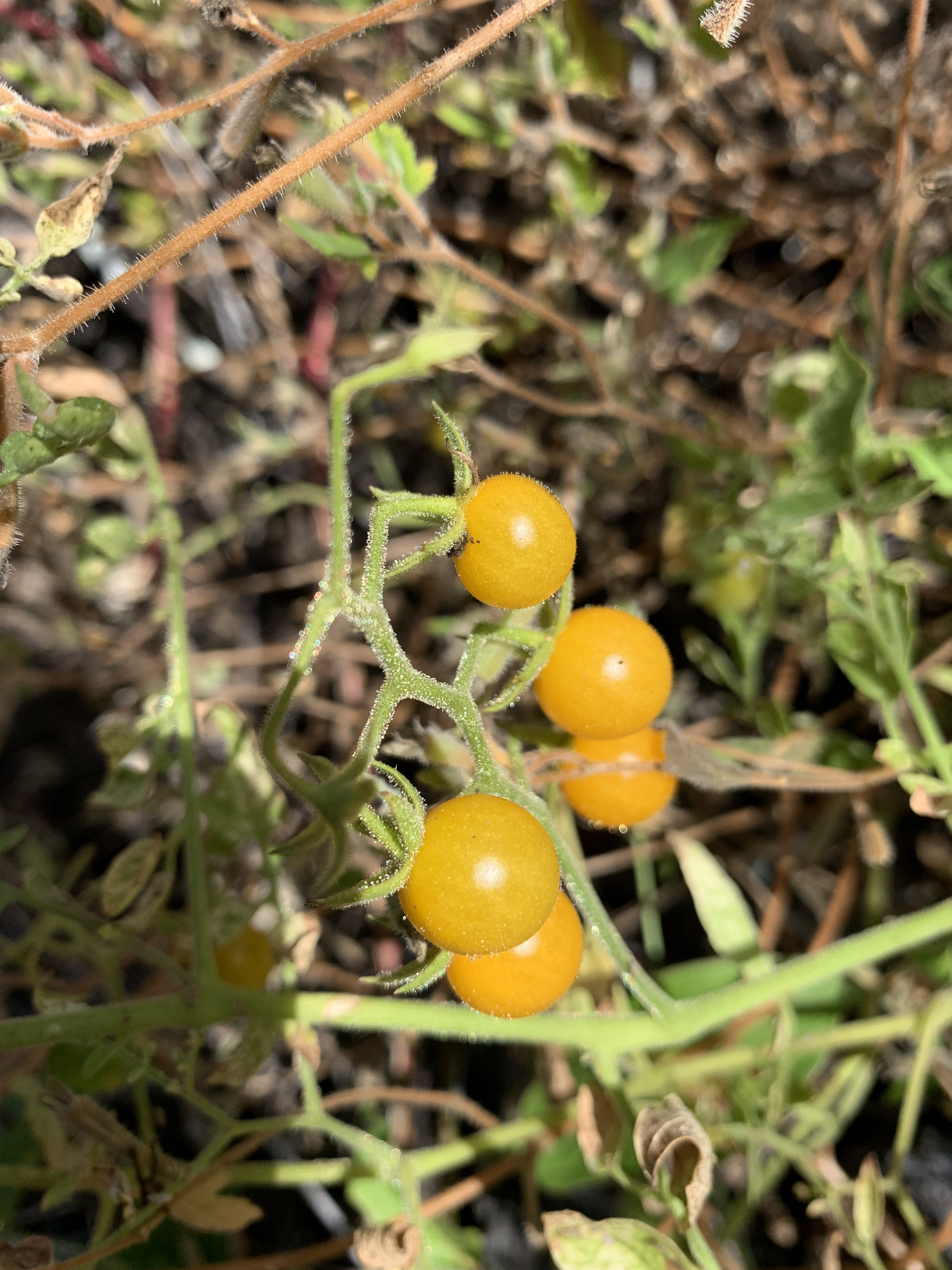
- Galapagos tomato in fruit

Scientific classification
- Kingdom: Plantae
- Clade: Tracheophytes
- Clade: Angiosperms
- Clade: Eudicots
- Clade: Asterids
- Order: Solanales
- Family: Solanaceae
- Genus: Solanum
- Species: S. cheesmaniae

Binomial name
- Solanum cheesmaniae (Riley) Fosburg

= Solanum cheesmaniae =

Species of flowering plant

Solanum cheesmaniae is one of two main species of wild tomatoes found on the Galápagos Islands. This species is the one most commonly called the Galapagos tomato. It is a wild tomato that evolved on the Galapagos Islands.

It often gets confused with the other native species, Solanum galapagense, which is similar but slightly different having more bushy smelly foliage and having smaller hairier orange fruits. It also gets confused with natural [Domestic tomato x S. cheesmaniae] hybrids and [Solanum pimpinellifolium x (S. cheesmaniae or S. galapagense)] hybrids because of introduction of domestic tomatoes to the Galapagos Islands, and the presence of Solanum pimpinellifolium on the islands and natural hybridization occurring between them.

This tomato is smaller and more pale than the oldest mainland cultivars, both in its fruit and leaves, but its flavor is similar. It can also be crossbred with it, which has been done professionally to impart its unusual disease resistances to some commercial cultivars.

== Description ==
Solanum cheesmaniae is a robust, perennial, herbaceous plant that at first grows erect, later lying. It reaches up to 1 metre (3 ft 3 in) high; its foliage reaches a similar diameter. It is often found in rocky coastal sites. The grayish stems become woody at the base and reach a diameter of 8 to 12 millimetres (0.31 to 0.47 in). The dense, velvety coat consists of white, single row, non-glandular trichomes up to 0.5 mm in length and occasional short-row, glandular trichomes with four or eight digits.

There are varying breeds of galapagos tomato, which can be differentiated by one to four-pinnate leaves, and habits of growing on the shore or inland.

== Distribution and ecology ==
The species occurs on the islands of Galapagos, 500 miles west of Ecuador. They grow in extremely wet, rocky areas from sea level to up to several hundred feet. The flowers and fruits appear consistently throughout the year, but there is a noticeable increase in flowering between September and October.

Solanum cheesmaniae is thought to have diverged from its closest relatives, Solanum lycopersicum and Solanum pimpinellifolium, less than 500,000 years ago.

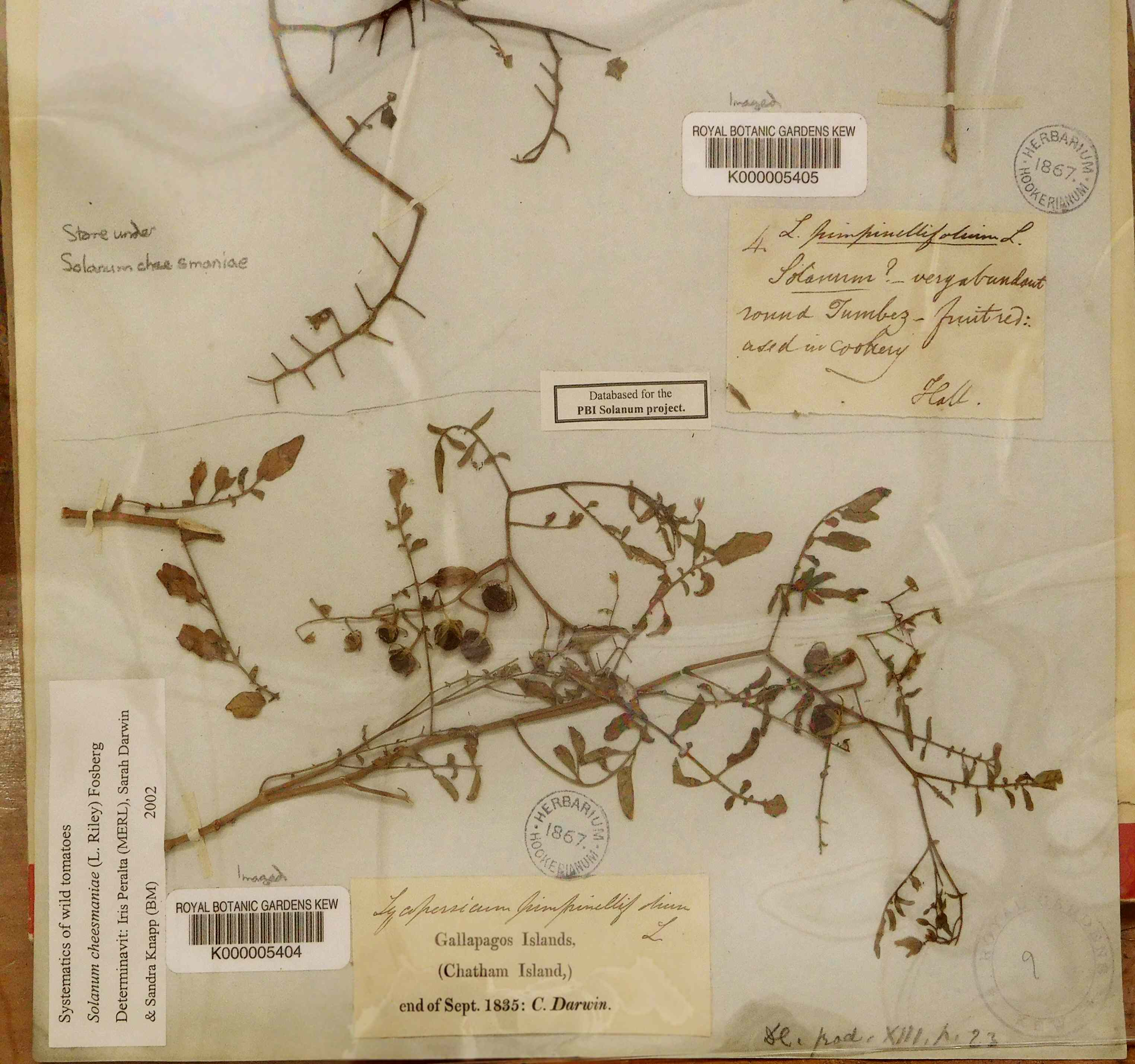
S. cheesmaniae Kew Herbarium sheet prepared by Charles Darwin, Chatham Island, Galapagos, September 1835

== Conservation ==
Although listed as a Least-concern species by the IUCN, recent observations suggest the species may in fact be threatened.
