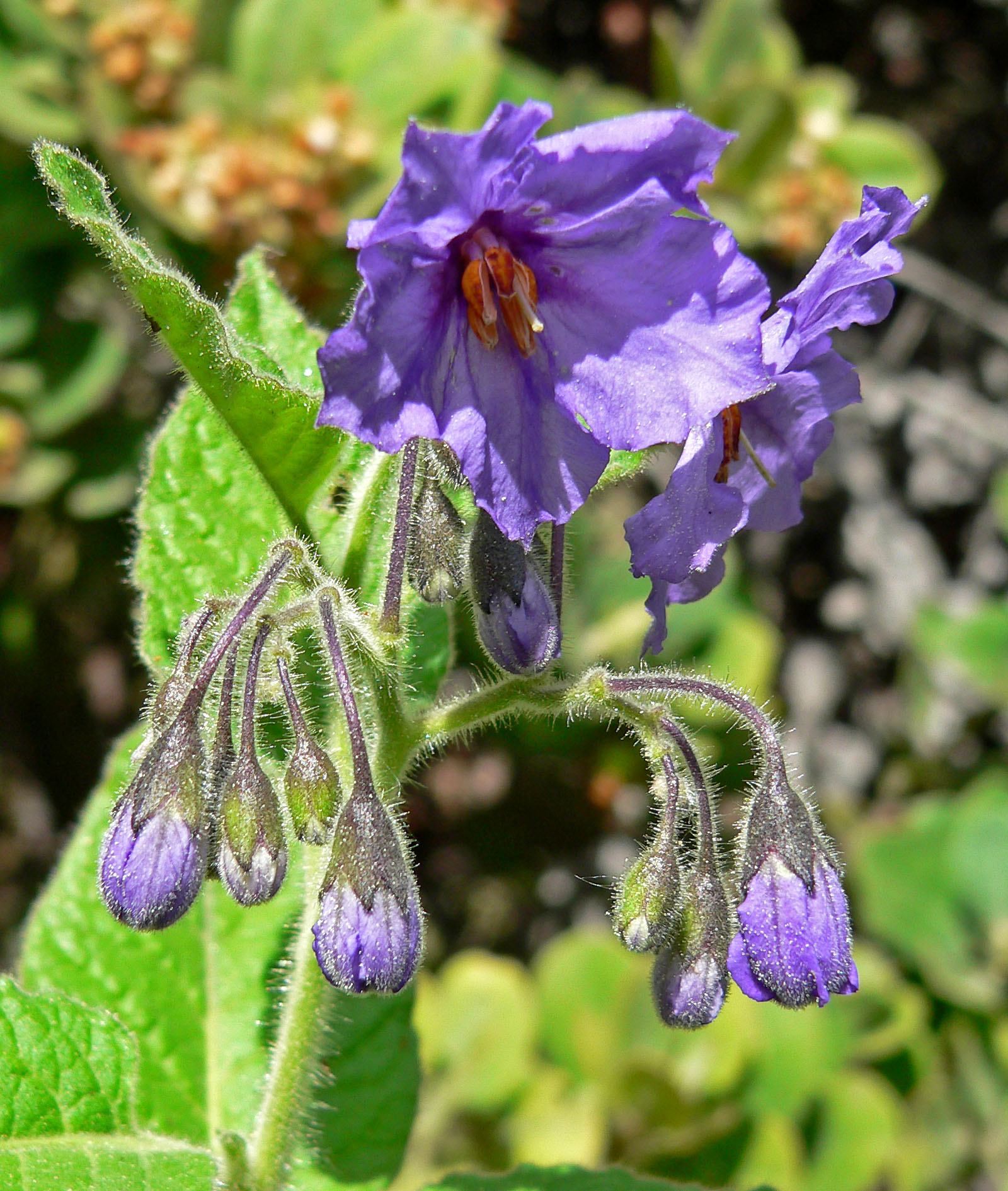

Conservation status
- Imperiled (NatureServe)

Scientific classification
- Kingdom: Plantae
- Clade: Tracheophytes
- Clade: Angiosperms
- Clade: Eudicots
- Clade: Asterids
- Order: Solanales
- Family: Solanaceae
- Genus: Solanum
- Species: S. wallacei

Binomial name
- Solanum wallacei (A.Gray) Parish

= Solanum wallacei =

Species of plant

Solanum wallacei, also known as Catalina nightshade, Wallace's nightshade, Northern island nightshade, or wild tomato, is a perennial plant that produces purple flowers, but otherwise resembles a tomato plant. The foliage and purple-black berries are poisonous.

This rare plant is native to canyons and hillsides on two of the three Channel Islands of California, as well as Guadalupe Island off Baja California. It blooms in April and May.

Wallace's nightshade is named for William Allen Wallace (1815-1893) who collected samples from the Los Angeles area around 1854. Also named for him is the woolly daisy, (Eriophyllum wallacei), among others.
