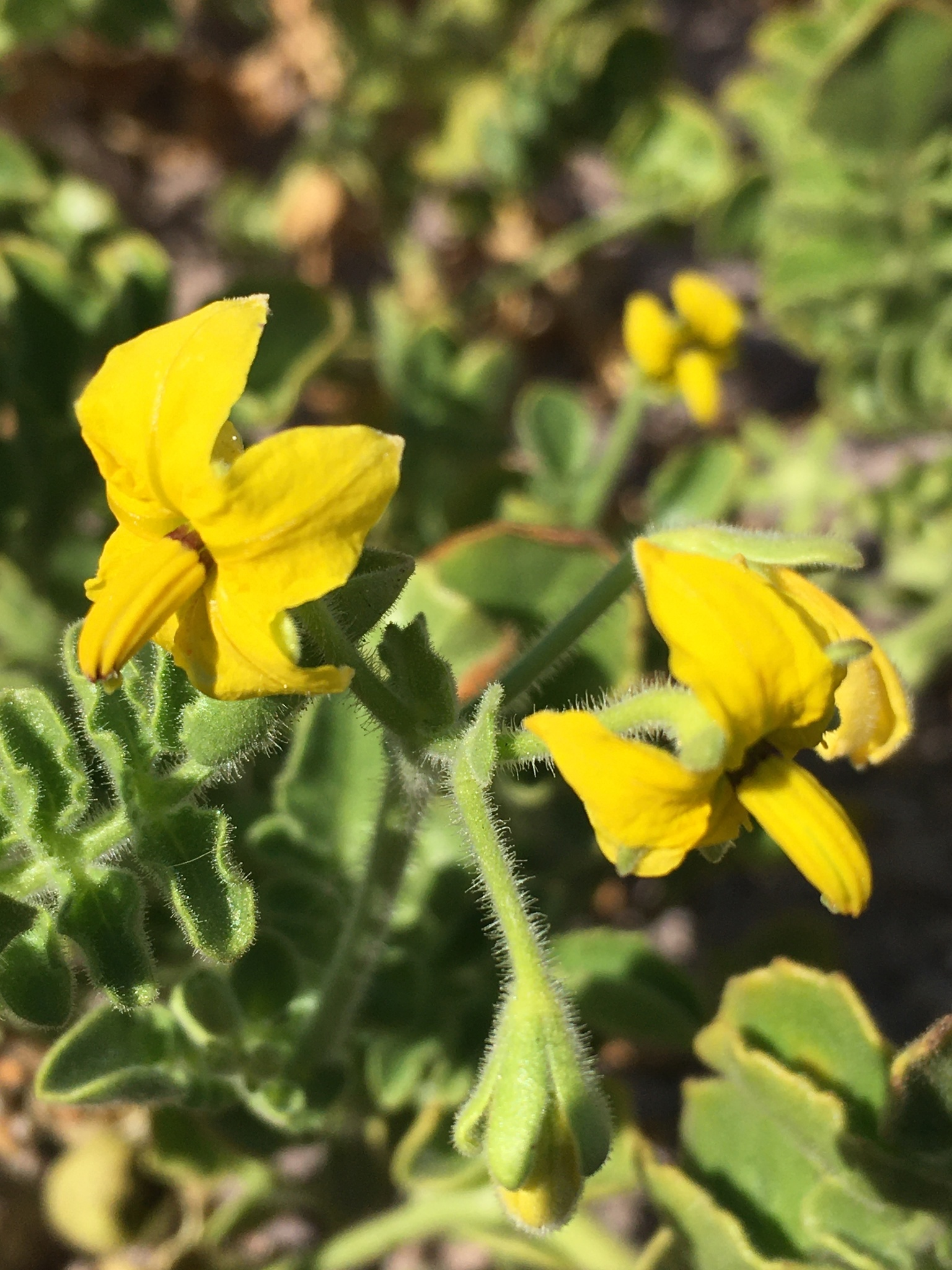
- Solanum pennellii in Arica, Chile

Scientific classification
- Kingdom: Plantae
- Clade: Tracheophytes
- Clade: Angiosperms
- Clade: Eudicots
- Clade: Asterids
- Order: Solanales
- Family: Solanaceae
- Genus: Solanum
- Species: S. pennellii

Binomial name
- Solanum pennellii Correll

Synonyms
- Lycopersicon pennellii (Correll) D'Arcy

= Solanum pennellii =

Species of flowering plant

Solanum pennellii (syn. Lycopersicon pennellii) is a species of wild tomato in the family Solanaceae. It is native to the Galápagos Islands, Peru, and northern Chile. It is being extensively studied for its drought resistance and other traits in an effort to improve the cultivated tomato, Solanum lycopersicum.

== Subtaxa ==
The following varieties are accepted:

- Solanum pennellii var. elachistus Martic. & Quezada – Tarapacá Region, Chile
- Solanum pennellii var. pennellii
