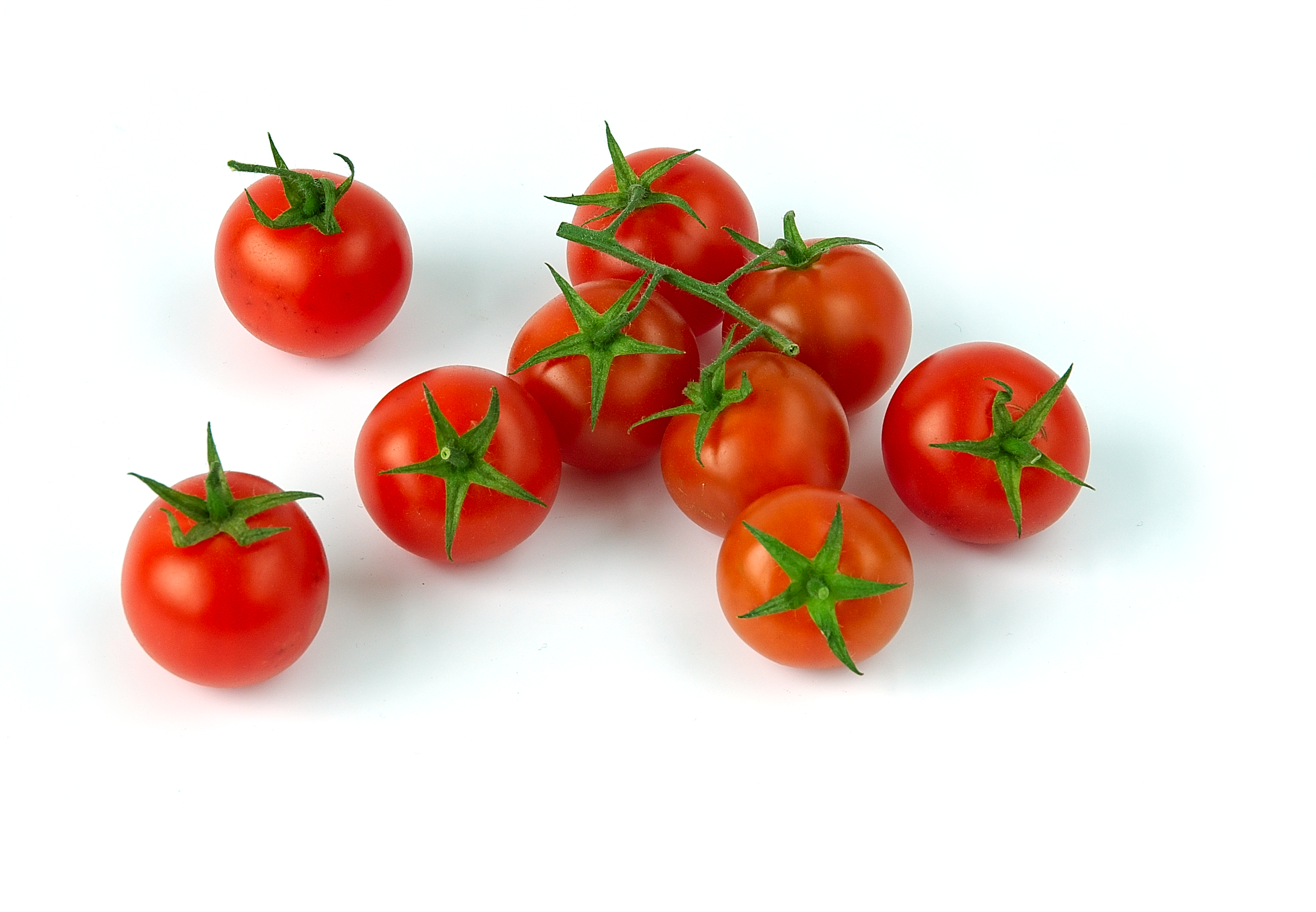

Scientific classification
- Kingdom: Plantae
- Clade: Tracheophytes
- Clade: Angiosperms
- Clade: Eudicots
- Clade: Asterids
- Order: Solanales
- Family: Solanaceae
- Genus: Solanum
- Species: S. lycopersicum
- Variety: S. l. var. cerasiforme

Trinomial name
- Solanum lycopersicum var. cerasiforme (Dunal) D.M.Spooner, G.J.Anderson & R.K.Jansen

Synonyms
- Lycopersicon lycopersicum var. cerasiforme; Lycopersicon esculentum var. cerasiforme

= Cherry tomato =

Tomato variety

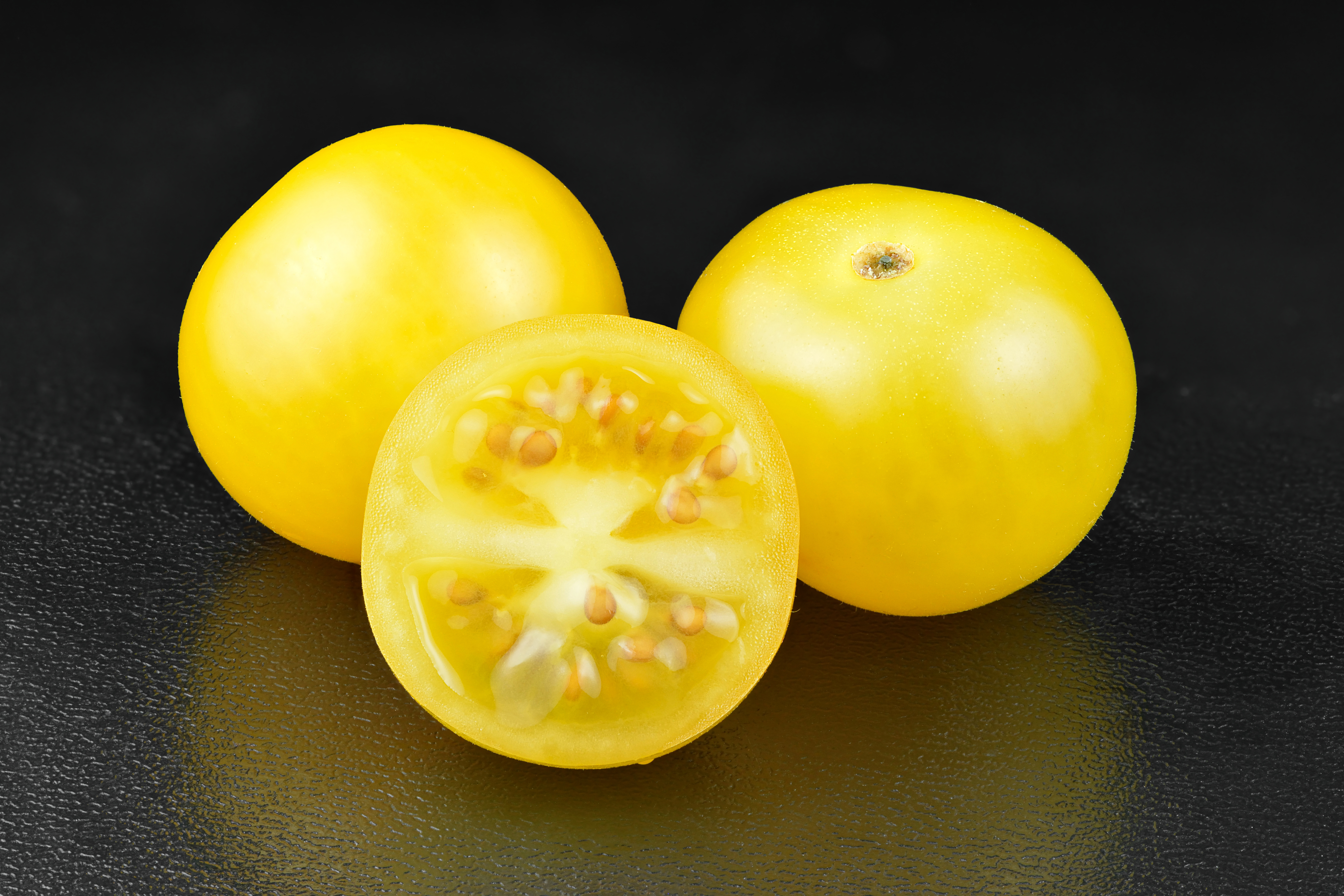
Yellow cherry tomatoes

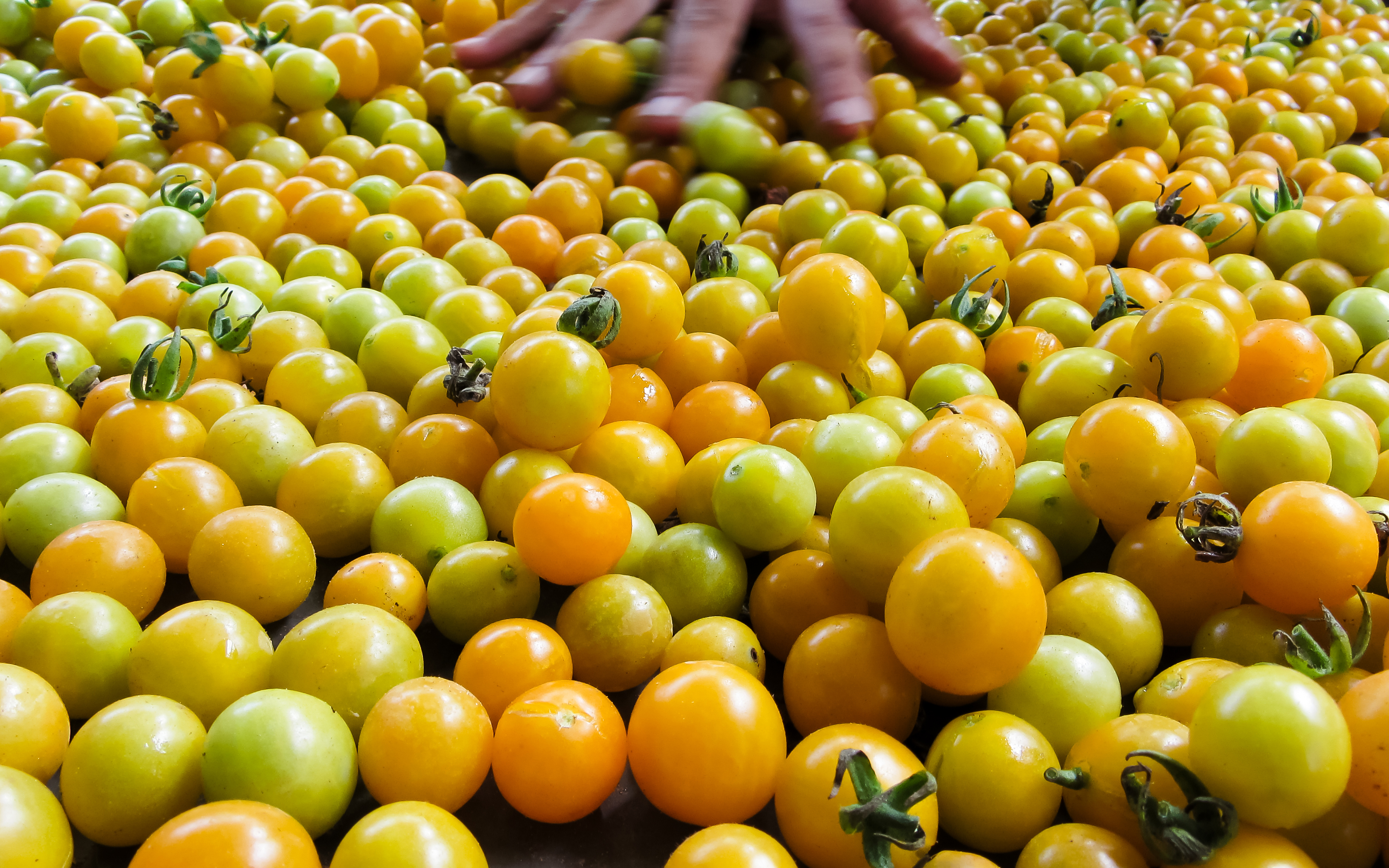
Freshly picked cherry tomatoes in Auroville, India

The cherry tomato is a type of small round tomato believed to be an intermediate genetic admixture between wild currant-type tomatoes and domesticated garden tomatoes. Cherry tomatoes range in size from a thumbtip up to the size of a golf ball, and can range from spherical to slightly oblong in shape. Although usually red, other colours such as orange, yellow, green, purple, and black also exist. Those shaped like an oblong share characteristics with plum tomatoes and are known as grape tomatoes. The cherry tomato is regarded as a botanical variety of the cultivated berry, Solanum lycopersicum var. cerasiforme.

== History ==
=== Origins and relationship to wild tomatoes ===
Cherry tomatoes are closely related to the wild ancestral forms of all cultivated tomatoes. Wild tomatoes (Solanum pimpinellifolium and related species) naturally produce small, cherry-sized fruits and are native to western South America, particularly the Andes region and coastal areas of Peru, Ecuador, and northern Chile. These wild species represent the genetic foundation from which all modern tomatoes, both large and small, were developed.

=== Domestication and spread ===
The tomato is thought to have been first domesticated in the Puebla-Veracruz region of Mexico, likely arriving from South America in the form of small-fruited wild or semi-domesticated varieties that resembled modern cherry tomatoes. Over thousands of years, indigenous peoples in Mesoamerica selectively bred these small tomatoes, with some lineages developing into larger varieties while others maintained the small fruit size characteristic of cherry tomatoes.

=== Early European documentation ===
The first direct reference to cherry tomatoes in European literature appears in 1623, in Pinax theatri botanici (English: Illustrated exposition of plants) by Swiss botanist Caspar Bauhin, which contains descriptions and classifications of approximately six thousand species. In a section on "Solanum" (nightshades), Bauhin wrote of a variety called Solanum racemosum cerasoru[m] forma, which translates to "Solanum [that is] full of clusters racemosum, in the form (shape) of cherries".

=== Modern popularity and development ===
Cherry tomatoes have been popular in the United States since at least 1919. Recipes using cherry tomatoes can be found in articles dating back to 1967.

=== Commercial breeding advances ===
In the 1970s, Israeli agricultural scientists developed commercial novelty varieties of cherry tomatoes, building upon existing cherry tomato genetics to create cultivars better suited for modern commercial production and export. Nathan Goldenberg approached Professor Nahum Kedar and Professor Haim Rabinowitch from the Faculty of Agriculture at the Hebrew University in Jerusalem with the idea of developing enhanced cherry tomato varieties.

The researchers were already working on developing tomato varieties suitable for cultivation in hot climates, including regular tomato varieties with extended shelf life, as part of Israeli government agricultural initiatives. The cherry tomato varieties they developed featured different flavor profiles, extended shelf life, and characteristics more favorable to commercial packaging and transport. These varieties gained popularity in the late 1980s, with sales peaking in 1992. This work helped advance plant breeding techniques and agricultural technology, building upon the long history of cherry tomato cultivation.

In the following decades, numerous other improved varieties were developed by researchers worldwide, and the popularity of cherry tomatoes continued to rise globally.

== Cultivars ==
=== Heritage and traditional varieties ===
Many cherry tomato varieties maintain close genetic relationships to ancestral small-fruited types:

- Matt's Wild Cherry – A variety that closely resembles wild tomato species, with very small red fruits
- Red Currant – Extremely small fruits, similar to wild S. pimpinellifolium
- Yellow Currant – Small yellow fruits on vigorous indeterminate plants

=== Modern hybrid varieties ===
Contemporary commercial cherry tomatoes are often products of modern plant breeding, selected for specific traits:

- Super Sweet 100 – A popular hybrid cultivar in the United States, resistant to both Fusarium and Verticillium wilt, known for extremely sweet flavor and prolific production
- Sungold – An indeterminate hybrid known for vigorous early-yielding plants and distinctive orange fruits with exceptional sweetness
- Sweet Million – High-yielding variety with good disease resistance and uniform red fruits

=== Specialty and colored varieties ===
Modern breeding has produced cherry tomatoes in various colors and with unique characteristics:

- Black Cherry – Dark purple-red fruits with complex flavor
- Green Grape – Green when ripe, with tangy-sweet flavor
- Chocolate Cherry – Dark brown fruits with rich, smoky flavor
- Selke Biodynamic – Named after Margrit Selke, developed for biodynamic agriculture

=== Traditional vs. modern varieties ===
While cherry tomatoes as a fruit type are ancient, many commercial varieties sold today are products of modern plant breeding. Some contemporary varieties are derived from large tomato varieties that were bred back toward smaller fruit size, while others maintain closer genetic relationships to traditional small-fruited varieties. Heritage varieties typically show greater genetic diversity and often display characteristics closer to wild ancestors, while modern hybrids are frequently selected for uniformity, extended shelf life, disease resistance, and specific commercial traits such as shipping durability and consistent ripening.

== Nutrition ==
Cherry tomatoes, raw
Nutritional value per 100 g (3.5 oz)
- Energy: 76 kJ (18 kcal)
- Carbohydrates: 5.2 g
- Sugars: 3.5 g
- Dietary fiber: 1.7 g
- Fat: 0 g
- Protein: 0.9 g
Vitamins and minerals
Vitamins	Quantity %DV^{†}
Vitamin A equiv. beta-Carotene	5% 42 μg 2% 250 μg
Thiamine (B1)	0% 0 mg
Riboflavin (B2)	0% 0 mg
Niacin (B3)	1% 0.17 mg
Pantothenic acid (B5)	0% 0 mg
Vitamin B6	1% 0.02 mg
Folate (B9)	4% 14 μg
Vitamin C	29% 26 mg
Vitamin E	1% 0.2 mg
Minerals	Quantity %DV^{†}
Calcium	1% 14 mg
Iron	4% 0.63 mg
Magnesium	3% 14 mg
Manganese	5% 0.12 mg
Phosphorus	3% 33 mg
Potassium	9% 260 mg
Sodium	0% 6 mg
Zinc	1% 0.16 mg
- Other constituents: Quantity
- Water: 92.2 g
- Link to Database entry
- ^{†}Percentages estimated using US recommendations for adults, except for potassium, which is estimated based on expert recommendation from the National Academies.
