= Solanum huaylasense =

Scientific classification
- Kingdom: Plantae
- Clade: Tracheophytes
- Clade: Angiosperms
- Clade: Eudicots
- Clade: Asterids
- Order: Solanales
- Family: Solanaceae
- Genus: Solanum
- Species: S. huaylasense

Binomial name
- Solanum huaylasense Peralta, Knapp & Spooner, 2005

Species of plant

Solanum huaylasense is a species of plant (wild tomato) in the family Solanaceae. It is endemic to Peru.

== Description ==
It is a sprawling perennial herb, woody at the base, the herb being up to 1 metre (3.3 ft) or more in diameter and up to 1m tall. Its stem diameter ranges between 7 and 10 millimetres (0.28 and 0.39 in) at the base, not hollow in age, green, minutely puberulent with simple, uniseriate, stiff 1–2-celled trichomes.It is a sprawling perennial herb, woody at the base, growing up to 1 m tall and up to 1 m in diameter. Sympodial units are 2-foliate (sometimes 3-foliate); internodes between 2 and 6 centimetres (0.79 and 2.36 in). Its leaves are interrupted imparipinnate, bright green, minutely pubescent with stiff simple uniseriate trichomes like those of the stems.

The petiole is between 1 and 4 centimetres (0.39 and 1.57 in); pseudostipules present or absent, if present then present on most nodes. Inflorescences range between 12 and 30 centimetres (4.7 and 11.8 in) in size, with 8–30 flowers, ebracteate or bracteate on most nodes from the base. Peduncle is between 5 and 15 centimetres (2.0 and 5.9 in); pedicels are between 0.8 and 1.6 centimetres (0.31 and 0.63 in), articulated in the upper half. Flowers with the calyx tube are minute, approximately between 0.5 and 1 millimetre (0.020 and 0.039 in). Fruit is between 1 and 1.4 centimetres (0.39 and 0.55 in) in diameter, globose and green when ripe. Seeds are obovate, narrowly winged at the apex and acute at the base, pale brown, pubescent with hair-like outgrowths of the integument cell radial walls, which give the surface a silky appearance. Chromosome number: n=12 .

== Distribution ==
On rocky slopes in the Department of Ancash and La Libertad, Peru at an altitude between 1,000 metres (3,300 ft) to 3,140 metres (10,300 ft) above sea level. This species is currently listed as endangered and the population trend is decreasing.
