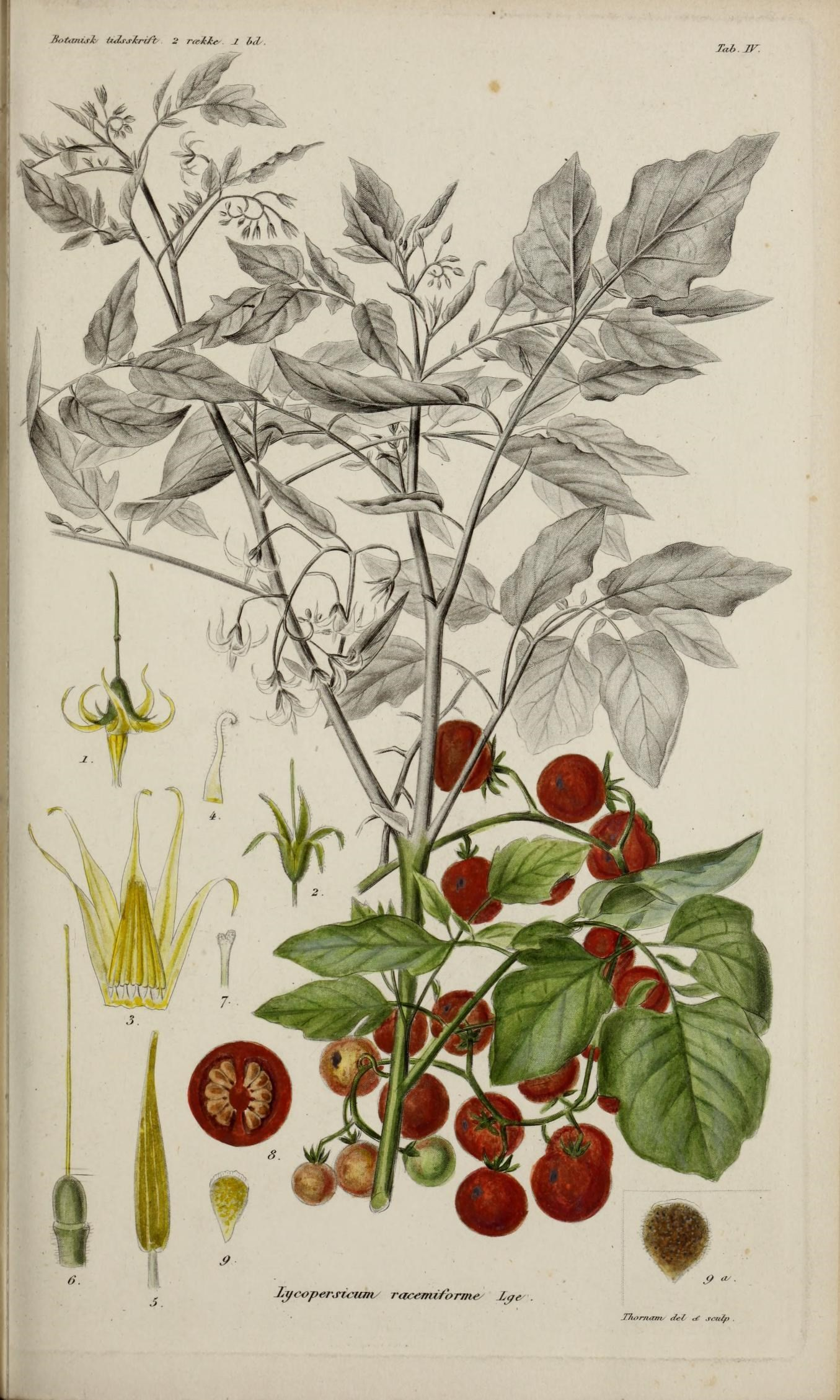

Scientific classification
- Kingdom: Plantae
- Clade: Tracheophytes
- Clade: Angiosperms
- Clade: Eudicots
- Clade: Asterids
- Order: Solanales
- Family: Solanaceae
- Genus: Solanum
- Species: S. pimpinellifolium

Binomial name
- Solanum pimpinellifolium L.

Synonyms
- Lycopersicon pimpinellifolium (L.) Mill. Lycopersicon racemigerum Lange

= Solanum pimpinellifolium =

Ancestral species of tomato plant

Solanum pimpinellifolium, commonly known as the currant tomato or pimp, is a wild species of tomato native to Ecuador and Peru but naturalized elsewhere, such as the Galápagos Islands. Its small fruits are edible, and it is commonly grown in gardens as an heirloom tomato, although it is considered to be wild rather than domesticated as is the commonly cultivated tomato species Solanum lycopersicum. Its genome was sequenced in 2012.

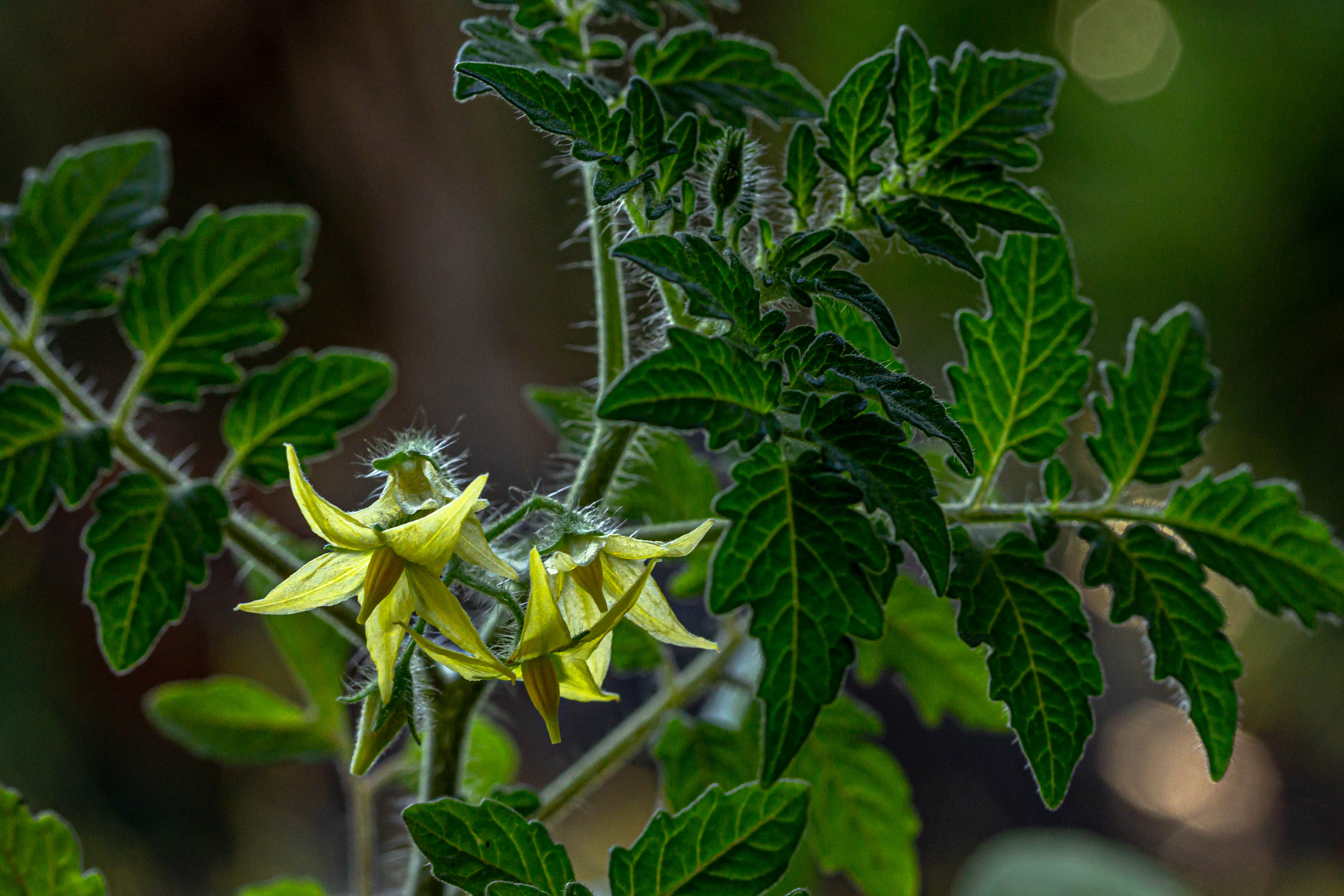
Flowers

== Breeding purposes ==
It will hybridize with common domestic tomatoes. There are annual, biennial, and perennial varieties. Solanum pimpinellifolium is important in tomato breeding.

Its relatedness to tomatoes and ability to freely cross with them has allowed it to be used for the introduction of disease resistance traits in tomato varieties, as well as in the study of the genetic control of tomato traits such as fruit shape and size. It has higher amounts of lycopene, vitamin C, and phenolic acids, as well as a higher antioxidant capacity than Solanum lycopersicum. Its 900 Mb genome differs from the tomato at 0.6% of base pairs; in comparison, they both differ from the potato (from which they diverged 7.3 million years ago) at 8% of bases.

In addition to its utilization in common tomato breeding, S. pimpinellifolium has also been the target of attempted de novo domestication, with the intent to create a separate domesticated species. This includes the use of CRISPR gene editing to replace 6 domestication-related loci, resulting in plants with altered architecture, and larger, more numerous fruits.

Considered the ancestor of domesticated tomatoes, it is valued for supplementing the limited gene pool of the domestic tomato. Due to agricultural development, the wild currant tomato is becoming less prevalent in the native range of northern Peru and southern Ecuador. In addition, seed collection is hampered by issues with the Convention on Biological Diversity, which regulates the ownership and international movement of genetic resources, but has been stuck in multilateral negotiations.

== Relationship with pre-Columbian cultures ==
=== Muchik linguistic evidence and Moche consumption ===
During the pre-Columbian era, the Moche culture (or Mochica), which inhabited the northern coast of Peru, actively collected and consumed the fruits of Solanum pimpinellifolium. Unlike the common domesticated tomato (Solanum lycopersicum), which lacks native names of Andean origin because its final domestication occurred in Mesoamerica, S. pimpinellifolium was integrated early into the local lexicon of the region. In the ancient Muchik language, the plant and its fruit were called faña (translated as "tender plant"), a designation recovered in modern philological research on the pre-Hispanic speech of the area.

=== Archaeobotanical record and ruderal habitat ===
The interaction between the Moche and this wild species is supported by its ecological behavior and archaeobotanical findings in the La Libertad Region. Solanum pimpinellifolium behaves as a ruderal plant, proliferating naturally and constantly along the edges of irrigation canals, ditches, and humid depressions built by pre-Hispanic agricultural engineers.

Contemporary botanical and archaeological inventories have recorded stable populations of this wild tomato growing directly over the cultural contexts of major Moche political-religious centers, such as the El Brujo Arqueological Complex (in the Chicama Valley) and near the Huaca del Rosario (in Magdalena de Cao). This resource holds high scientific and historical value because Peru is a key center of origin for the tomato, hosting 14 of the world's 17 tomato species. Research by Peru's Ministry of the Environment indicates that roughly 90% of the genes in modern commercially cultivated tomatoes worldwide originate from these wild Andean relatives, which contributed high natural sugar levels and lycopene content to ancient diets.
