= Solanum arcanum =

Conservation status
- Least Concern (IUCN 3.1)

Scientific classification
- Kingdom: Plantae
- Clade: Tracheophytes
- Clade: Angiosperms
- Clade: Eudicots
- Clade: Asterids
- Order: Solanales
- Family: Solanaceae
- Genus: Solanum
- Species: S. arcanum

Binomial name
- Solanum arcanum Peralta

Synonyms
- Lycopersicon peruvianum var. humifusum C.H.Mull.

Species of plant in the nightshade family

Solanum arcanum is a species of flowering plant in the nightshade family Solanaceae in section Lycopersicon, the tomatoes, endemic to Peru.

== Description ==
Solanum arcanum is a perennial plant, woody at the base, being up to 1 m (3.3 ft) or more wide and up to 1 m (3.3 ft) tall. Its stem is between 7 and 12 mm (0.3 and 0.5 in) in diameter at its base, often hollow, green, glabrous to variously pubescent with a mixture of simple uniseriate trichomes.

Its sympodial units are 2-foliate; internodes being between 2 and 6 cm (0.8 and 2.4 in). Its leaves are interrupted imparipinnate, green to pale beneath, glabrous to sparsely short pubescent with a mixture of simple uniseriate trichomes, some populations lacking trichomes. The petiolule is between 0.5 and 1 cm (0.2 and 0.4 in).

Inflorescences are between 6 and 20 cm (2 and 8 in) in size, simple, with 5–20 flowers, ebracteate or nearly all the nodes bracteate; peduncle between 3.5 and 10 cm (1.4 and 3.9 in), glabrous and minutely glandular to densely velvety pubescent with intermixed longer patent trichomes like those of the stems. The pedicels are between 1.1 and 1.7 cm (0.4 and 0.7 in), articulated at the middle or in the distal half. Buds are conical, straight, approximately half way exerted from the calyx. Flowers with the calyx tube are minute, the lobes lanceolate; corolla is between 1.8 and 2 cm (0.7 and 0.8 in), pentagonal and yellow.

Ovary is globose, glabrous or with a few minute trichomes at the apex; the style being between 0.8 and 1 cm (0.3 and 0.4 in); stigma capitate and green. The fruit is between 1 and 1.4 cm (0.4 and 0.6 in) in diameter, globose and green with a dark green stripe around it that may change to purple at maturity. Seeds are obovate, narrowly winged at the apex and acute at the base, pale brown, pubescent with hair-like outgrowths of the tegument cell radial walls, which give the surface a silky appearance. Chromosome number: n=12.

== Distribution ==
It is found in coastal and inland Andean valleys in northern Peru at elevations 100–2,500 metres (300–8,200 feet).
