= Juvenile hormone diol kinase =

The conjugate (10S,11S) JH diol phosphate is the product of a two-step enzymatic process: conversion of JH to JH diol and then addition of a phosphate group to C10. The enzyme responsible for the phosphorylation of JH diol is JH diol kinase (JHDK), which was first characterized from the Malpighian tubules of early fifth instars of M. sexta. JHDK (EC 2.1.7.3) was discovered when an analysis of JH I metabolites in vivo yielded, in addition to the expected metabolites, a very polar JH I conjugate that was subsequently identified as JH I diol phosphate. Maxwell et al. showed JHDK to contain 3 potential calcium binding sites, and a single ATP-Mg2+ binding site (p-loop). The modeled structure contains nine helices, one beta sheet, and 10 loops. JHDK is also present in the silkworm, where it also functions as homodimer. It lacks a JH response element; Li et al. (2005). It has a high degree of identity to M. sexta JHDK. Later Uno et al. (2007) characterized the A. mellifera enzyme in a proteomic study. It has 183 amino acid residues. More recently, Zeng et al. (2015) have characterized JHDK from Spodoptera litura. It also has 183 amino acid residues, just as does the B. mori enzyme. These enzymes all have high sequence similarity. The M. sexta enzyme contains 184 residues.

JHDK from M. sexta Malpighian tubules is a cytosolic protein composed of two identical subunits of 20 kDa, as determined by MS. Gel filtration studies indicate it has a molecular mass of approximately 43 kDa. JHDK displays a K_{m} in the nanomolar range for JH I diol, which is appropriate for an enzyme responsible for clearance of a hormone whose titers rarely exceeds 10 nM. Most significantly, the catalytic activity of JHDK parallels developmentally that of JHEH, a requisite if JH diol phosphate is a legitimate terminal metabolite. Analysis of the kcat/K_{m} ratio for the diols of JH I, II, and III indicates that JH I diol is the preferred substrate, suggesting a preference for an ethyl group at the C7 position. JHDK requires both Mg^{2+} and ATP for activity. Characterization of the juvenile hormone epoxide hydrolase (JHEH) and juvenile hormone diol phosphotransferase (JHDPT) from Manduca sexta Malpighian tubules. Arch. Insect Biochem. Physiol. 30, 255-270), although excess Mg^{2+} and Ca^{2+} inhibit its activity.

The specificity of JHDK for JH I diol is relatively high, considering the multitude of potential phosphate acceptor groups present in a cell. The enzyme does not recognize methyl geranoate diol (one isoprenyl unit shorter than JH) nor methyl geranylgeranoate diol (one isoprenyl group longer than JH), yet it does recognize JH I ethyl ester diol. It also recognizes both JH diol enantiomers, indicating that the absolute stereospecificity of the hydroxy groups is of minor importance. Most surprising is the enzyme's inability to recognize JH acid diols. Because JH acid diol cannot be phosphorylated by JHDK, the generally accepted pathway for JH catabolism (JH acid is converted to JH acid diol) must be reconsidered. Still, the role of cellular JHE becomes problematic if the pathway catalyzed by JHEH and JHDK is the major pathway for JH catabolism in the cell. The fact that JH diol phosphate is a significant metabolite certainly weakens the long-held dogma that JH esterase is most important in JH catabolism. While JHE has been noted to have phosphatase activity, to our knowledge it has never been tested on JH diol phosphate.

The sequence and hypothetical structures of M. sexta, D. melanogaster, and B. mori JHDK have been analyzed. A partial characterization of JHDK from whole-body homogenates of D. melanogaster indicates that it is similar to the enzyme in M. sexta, with the exception of its subunit structure. The active D. melanogaster JHDK is a monomer of ~20 kDa, while the active M. sexta (GenBank accession number: AJ430670) and B. mori JHDKs (GenBank accession number: AY363308) are composed of two identical 20 kDa subunits. Similarities in chromatographic properties, isoelectric point, and enzyme activity led to conclude that sarcoplasmic calcium-binding protein 2 (dSCP2) is the probable D. melanogaster homologue of M. sexta JHDK. The M. sexta gene codes for an enzyme that has 59% sequence identity and >80% similarity to dSCP2 of D. melanogaster (GenBank accession number: AF093240; CG14904). Li et al. reported that the B. mori JHDK is composed of a single exon of 637 bp. The B. mori JHDK is expressed most prevalently in the gut, as determined by Northern blot analyses, and is not under the direct control of JH at the transcriptional level. Maxwell et al. generated a 3D model that they used for in silico docking simulations. They capitalized on the facts that the catalytic site of JHDK must contain a purine (GTP) binding site and hydrophobic pocket for JH diol, and that the scaffolding for dSCP2 is known. Surrounding the putative substrate-binding site, both the M. sexta and D. melanogaster JHDKs contain the three conserved nucleotide-binding elements common to nucleotide binding proteins. The model further demonstrates that the protein contains four domains that form two pairs of a helix-loop-helix motif (EF-hand;. Charge interactions in the hydrophobic binding pocket, as well as its depth (19 Â), are complementary to the extended conformation of the diol. Moreover, the hydrophobic nature of the binding pocket complements the C1 ester of the substrate and supports the observation that JH diol is the only substrate for this enzyme.
