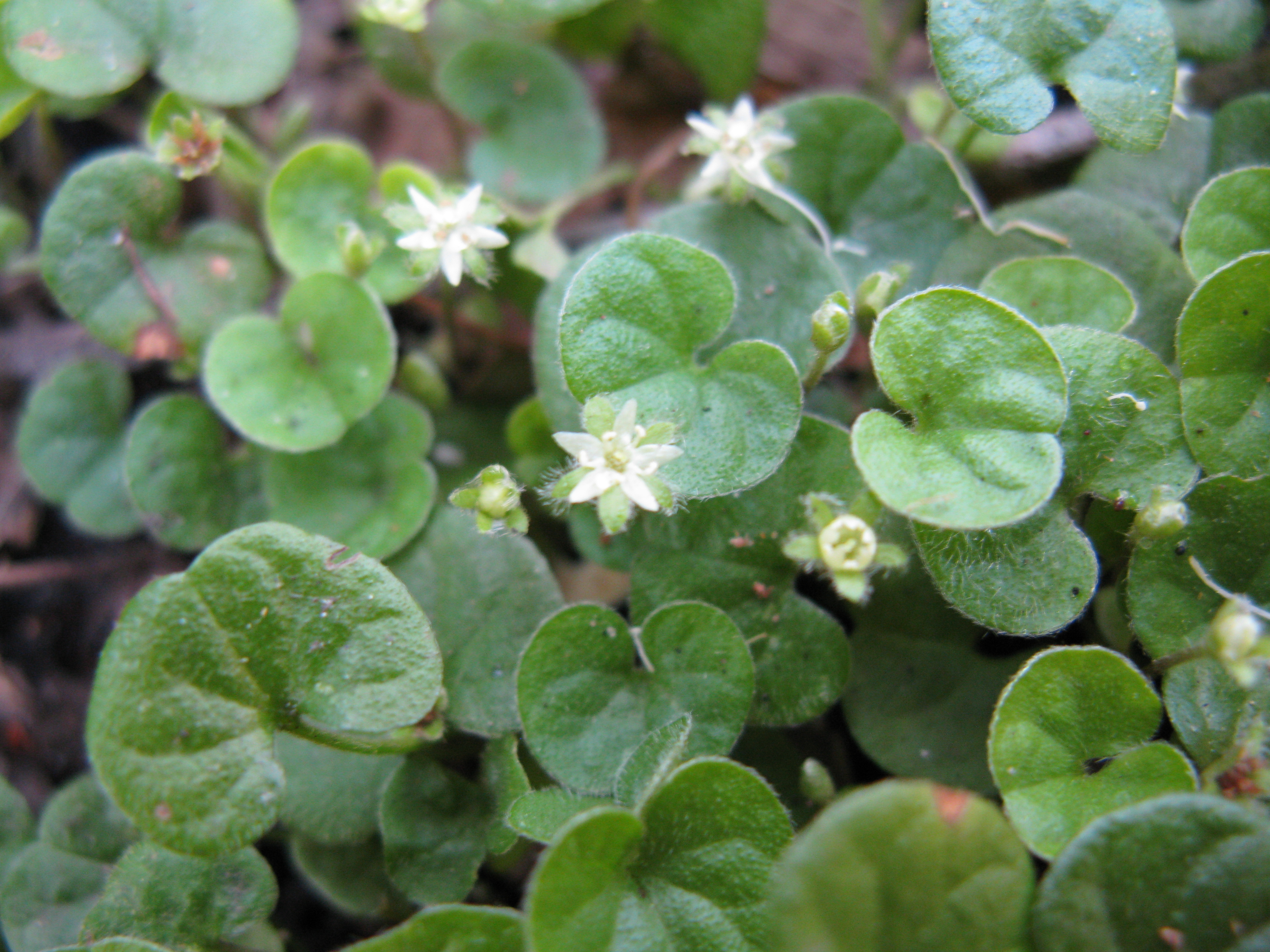

Scientific classification
- Kingdom: Plantae
- Clade: Embryophytes
- Clade: Tracheophytes
- Clade: Spermatophytes
- Clade: Angiosperms
- Clade: Eudicots
- Clade: Asterids
- Order: Solanales
- Family: Convolvulaceae
- Genus: Dichondra
- Species: D. repens

Binomial name
- Dichondra repens J.R.Forst. & G.Forst.

Synonyms
- Steripha reniformis Sol. ex Gaertn.

= Dichondra repens =

Species of plant

Dichondra repens, commonly known as kidney weed, Mercury Bay weed, tom thumb, or yilibili in the Dharawal language, is a species of flowering plant in the family Convolvulaceae and is native to Australia, New Zealand, and the Indian Ocean islands, Mauritius, Réunion and Rodrigues. It is a perennial, herb with kidney-shaped to round leaves and small, greenish-yellow, star-shaped flowers.

== Description ==
Dichondra repens is a perennial herb with a creeping habit, forming roots at the nodes. The leaves are kidney-shaped to circular, mostly 5–25 mm (0.20–0.98 in) long and 5–30 mm (0.20–1.18 in) wide on a petiole 10–50 mm (0.39–1.97 in) long. The base of the leaf is heart-shaped and its apex round or slightly notched. Both surfaces of the leaves are covered with soft, greyish hairs. The flowers are borne singly on a pedicel usually 5–60 mm (0.20–2.36 in) long, the sepals joined at the base with lobes 2.5–4 mm (0.098–0.157 in) long. The petals are pale greenish-yellow and joined at the base, forming a short tube with lobes about the same length as the sepal lobes. Flowering occurs throughout the year with a peak in spring and summer, more profusely from September to February with a peak in November. The fruit is a hairy, two-lobed capsule.

== Taxonomy ==
Dichondra repens was first formally described in 1775 by German naturalists Johann Reinhold Forster and Georg Forster in Characteres generum plantarum, and the lectotype collected by them in New Zealand, is in the Sammlung für Völkerkunde anthropological collection in Göttingen. The specific epithet repens is a Latin adjective meaning 'creeping'.

== Distribution and habitat ==
Kidney weed is widespread in all Australian States and New Zealand, and occurs on Mauritius, Réunion and Rodrigues in the Indian Ocean. It grows in forest, woodland and grassland on clay or clay-based soils that are medium to high in nutrients, and is a weed of lawns. Associated species in New South Wales are river peppermint (Eucalyptus elata), thin-leaved stringybark (E. eugenioides), woollybutt (E. longifolia) and snow-in-summer (Melaleuca linariifolia).

== Ecology ==
The native Pacific black duck (Anas superciliosa) eats the seeds of this species.

== Use in horticulture ==
This species is cultivated as an ornamental plant, and can be used as a lawn substitute or groundcover in gardens.

== Chemistry ==
D. repens uses acylsugars as a chemical defence. Among these are acylated resin glycosides which synergize with antibiotics to reverse bacterial multidrug resistance (MDR).
