= JHE =

JHE may refer to:

- John Hart Ely, American legal scholar
- Jacques-Henri Eyraud, a French businessman
- The Jimi Hendrix Experience, a British-American rock band fronted by Jimi Hendrix
- Juvenile-Hormone Esterase, an enzyme catalyzes the hydrolysis of juvenile hormone
- Journal of Hydraulic Engineering, an engineering journal published by the American Society of Civil Engineers
- Journal of Hydrologic Engineering, an engineering journal published by ASCE
- Journal of Humanitarian Engineering, an engineering journal published by Engineers without Borders Australia
