= Haemolymph juvenile hormone-binding protein =

Identifiers
- Symbol: JHBP
- Pfam: PF06585
- InterPro: IPR010562
Available protein structures:
- Pfam: structures / ECOD
- PDB: RCSB PDB; PDBe; PDBj
- PDBsum: structure summary

In molecular biology, the haemolymph juvenile hormone-binding protein (JHPB) family of proteins consists of several insect specific haemolymph juvenile hormone binding proteins. Juvenile hormone (JH) has a profound effect on insects. It regulates embryogenesis, maintains the status quo of larva development and stimulates reproductive maturation in the adult forms. JH is transported from the sites of its synthesis to target tissues by a haemolymph carrier called juvenile hormone-binding protein (JHBP). JHBP protects the JH molecules from hydrolysis by non-specific esterases present in the insect haemolymph. The crystal structure of the JHBP from Galleria mellonella (greater wax moth) shows an unusual fold consisting of a long alpha-helix wrapped in a much curved antiparallel beta-sheet. The folding pattern for this structure closely resembles that found in some tandem-repeat mammalian lipid-binding and bactericidal permeability-increasing proteins, with a similar organisation of the major cavity and a disulfide bond linking the long helix and the beta-sheet. It would appear that JHBP forms two cavities, only one of which, the one near the N- and C-termini, binds the hormone; binding induces a conformational change, of unknown significance.
