= Acylsugar =

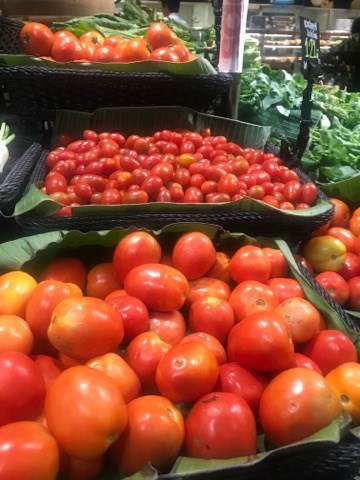

Acylsugars are a group of plant-derived protective secondary metabolites that lack nitrogen. They typically consist of aliphatic acyl groups of low to medium chain lengths esterified to the hydroxyl groups of glucose or sucrose. Presence of such acyl groups gives these compounds hydrophobic properties. This group of compounds has been extensively studied in tomato and related species, in which these compounds are produced and secreted in sporadic amounts from trichomes on the plant leaf and stem surface. Production of copious quantities of these acylsugars give a sticky feel to the plant tissue. In particular, this flower has shown to distract herbivorous insect pests against thrips damage. It is believed that acylsugars provide physical and/or chemical defense to the plant.

Acylsugars are nonvolatile and viscous polyesters that consist of acyl chains on sucrose or glucose backbones. These attached acid chains may vary in length from short to medium which affects the phenotypic characteristics of the plant. Other factors that may affect plant phenotype includes the presence of either glucose or sucrose, the number of acyl chains as well as the total amounts of acyl sugars.

== Distribution ==
Acylsugars are produced in the secretory glandular trichomes of various plants, specifically those that belong to the family Solanaceae. These compounds are identified to be responsible for physical and/or chemical defense plant defense. Additionally, potential commercial applications were also found in these compounds.

Some species that are known to produce acylsugars include Solanum lycopersicum, Solanum pennellii, Solanum habrochaites, Nicotiana benthamiana, Petunia axillaris and Petunia integrifolia.

== Functions ==
The function of acylsugars has been the subject of much research. For instance, acylsugars in Solanum pennellii discourage pests from laying eggs and contain compounds that are toxic to herbivores. A study showed that this natural insect-repellent property may lead to the breeding and development of a thrips-resistant tomato which could be of commercial benefit. Additionally, acylsugars from other genera were also found to give protection against herbivores and plant pathogens.

Acylsugars are also classified as amphiphiles which provide a supplementary source of water in plants by reducing the surface tension of dew, allowing it to be absorbed more easily.

Acylsugars are also used in pesticides, food additives, cosmetics and personal care products, antibiotics, and anti inflammatory medications. Therefore, acylsugars have been the focus of studies aiming to discover successful breeding crop techniques and synthetic methods of metabolizing acylsugars.

== See also ==
- Phytochemicals
