= Farnesyl diphosphate synthase =

Farnesyl diphosphate synthase may refer to:

- Z-farnesyl_diphosphate_synthase, EC 2.5.1.68
- Dimethylallyltranstransferase, EC 2.5.1.1
- (2Z,6Z)-farnesyl diphosphate synthase
