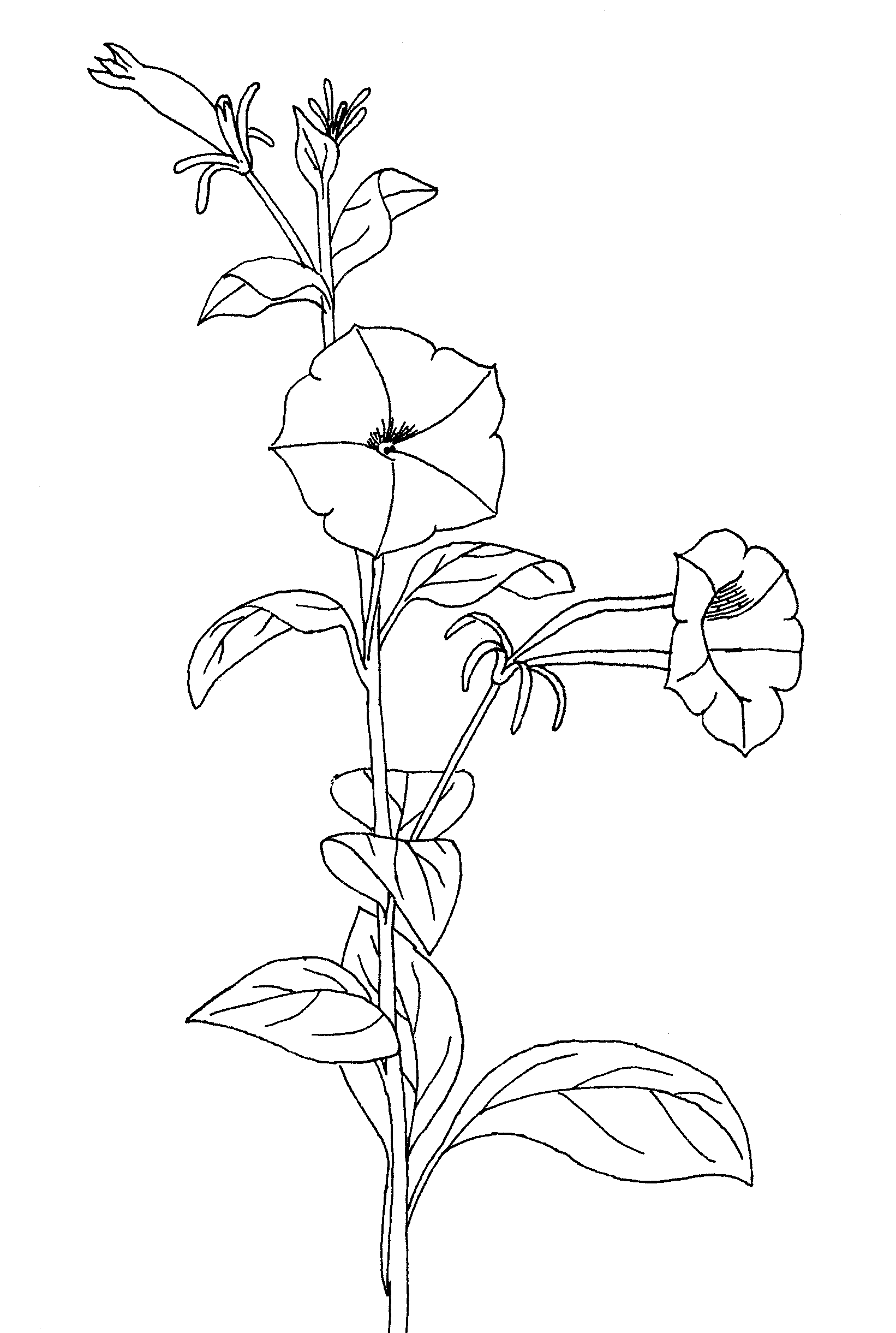
- Botanical illustration

Scientific classification
- Kingdom: Plantae
- Clade: Embryophytes
- Clade: Tracheophytes
- Clade: Angiosperms
- Clade: Eudicots
- Clade: Asterids
- Order: Solanales
- Family: Solanaceae
- Genus: Petunia
- Species: P. inflata

Binomial name
- Petunia inflata R.E.Fr.

Synonyms
- Petunia integrifolia subsp. inflata (R.E.Fr.) Wijsman; Stimoryne integrifolia subsp. inflata (R.E.Fr.) Wijsman

= Petunia inflata =

Species of flowering plant

Petunia inflata is a species of flowering plant in the family Solanaceae, native to Paraguay, northeastern Argentina, and southern Brazil. It is a member of the Petunia integrifolia clade, and is one of the parents of the garden petunia, Petunia × atkinsiana (formerly Petunia × hybrida). It is also widely used in laboratory studies of the S-RNase mechanism of self-incompatibility in plants.
