= (2Z,6Z)-farnesyl diphosphate synthase =

Enzyme

Identifiers
- EC no.: 2.5.1.92

Databases
- IntEnz: IntEnz view
- BRENDA: BRENDA entry
- ExPASy: NiceZyme view
- KEGG: KEGG entry
- MetaCyc: metabolic pathway
- PRIAM: profile
- PDB structures: RCSB PDB PDBe PDBsum
Search
- PMC: articles
- PubMed: articles
- NCBI: proteins

(2Z,6Z)-farnesyl diphosphate synthase (EC 2.5.1.92, cis,cis-farnesyl diphosphate synthase, Z,Z-FPP synthase, zFPS, Z,Z-farnesyl pyrophosphate synthase) is an enzyme with systematic name dimethylallyl-diphosphate:isopentenyl-diphosphate cistransferase (adding 2 isopentenyl units). This enzyme catalyses the following chemical reaction

dimethylallyl diphosphate + 2 isopentenyl diphosphate $\rightleftharpoons$ 2 diphosphate + (2Z,6Z)-farnesyl diphosphate

This enzyme was originally characterized from the wild hairy tomato Solanum habrochaites.
