= Trichome =

Fine hair-like growth on plants

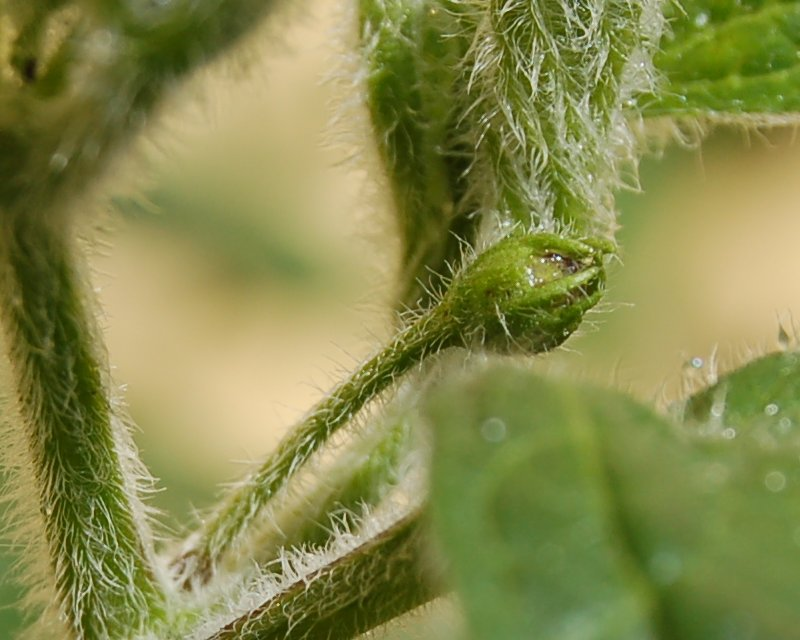
Flower bud of a Capsicum pubescens plant, with many trichomes

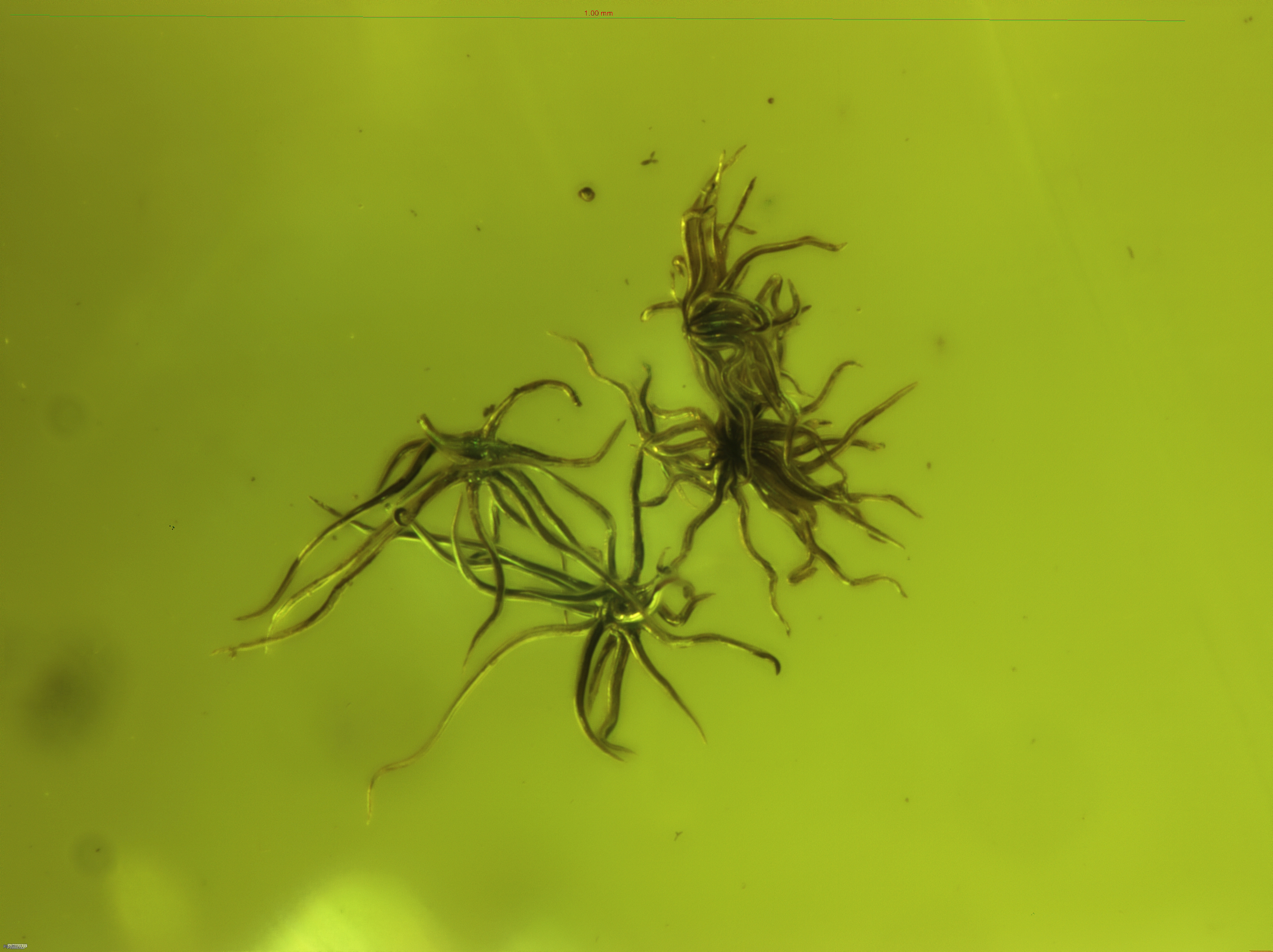
Fossil stellate hair (trichome) probably of an oak, in Baltic amber; image is about 1 millimetre (1/32 inch) wide.

Trichomes (/ˈtraɪkoʊmz, ˈtrɪkoʊmz/; from Ancient Greek τρίχωμα (tríkhōma) 'hair') are fine outgrowths or appendages on plants, algae, lichens, and certain protists. They are of diverse structure and function. Examples are hairs, glandular hairs, scales, and papillae. A covering of any kind of hair on a plant is an indumentum, and the surface bearing them is said to be pubescent.

== Algal trichomes ==
Certain, usually filamentous, algae have the terminal cell produced into an elongate hair-like structure called a trichome. The same term is applied to such structures in some cyanobacteria, such as Spirulina and Oscillatoria. The trichomes of cyanobacteria may be unsheathed, as in Oscillatoria, or sheathed, as in Calothrix. These structures play an important role in preventing soil erosion, particularly in cold desert climates. The filamentous sheaths form a persistent sticky network that helps maintain soil structure.

== Plant trichomes ==
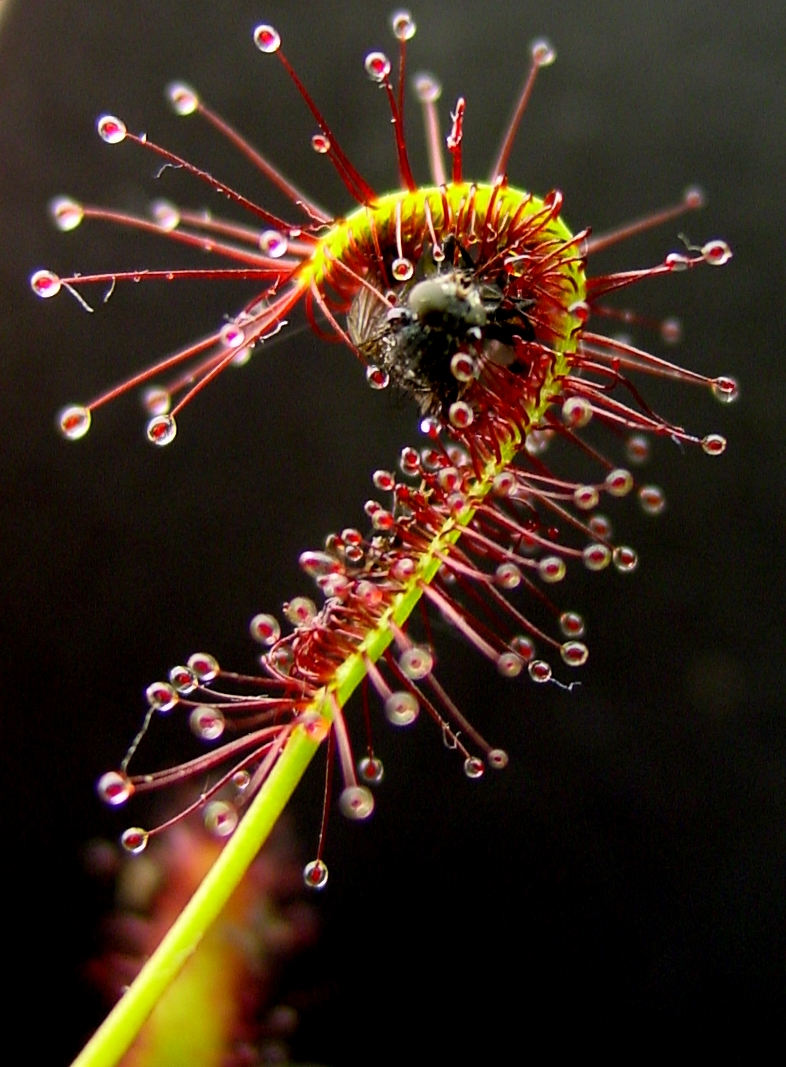
Sticky trichomes of a carnivorous plant, Drosera capensis with a trapped insect, contain proteolytic enzymes

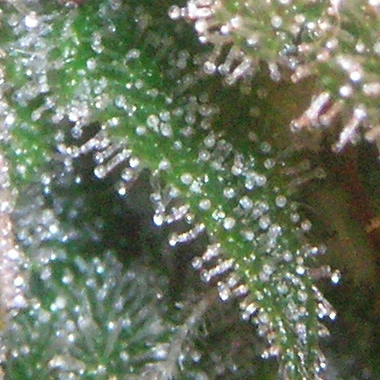
Glandular trichomes on Cannabis, rich in cannabinoids

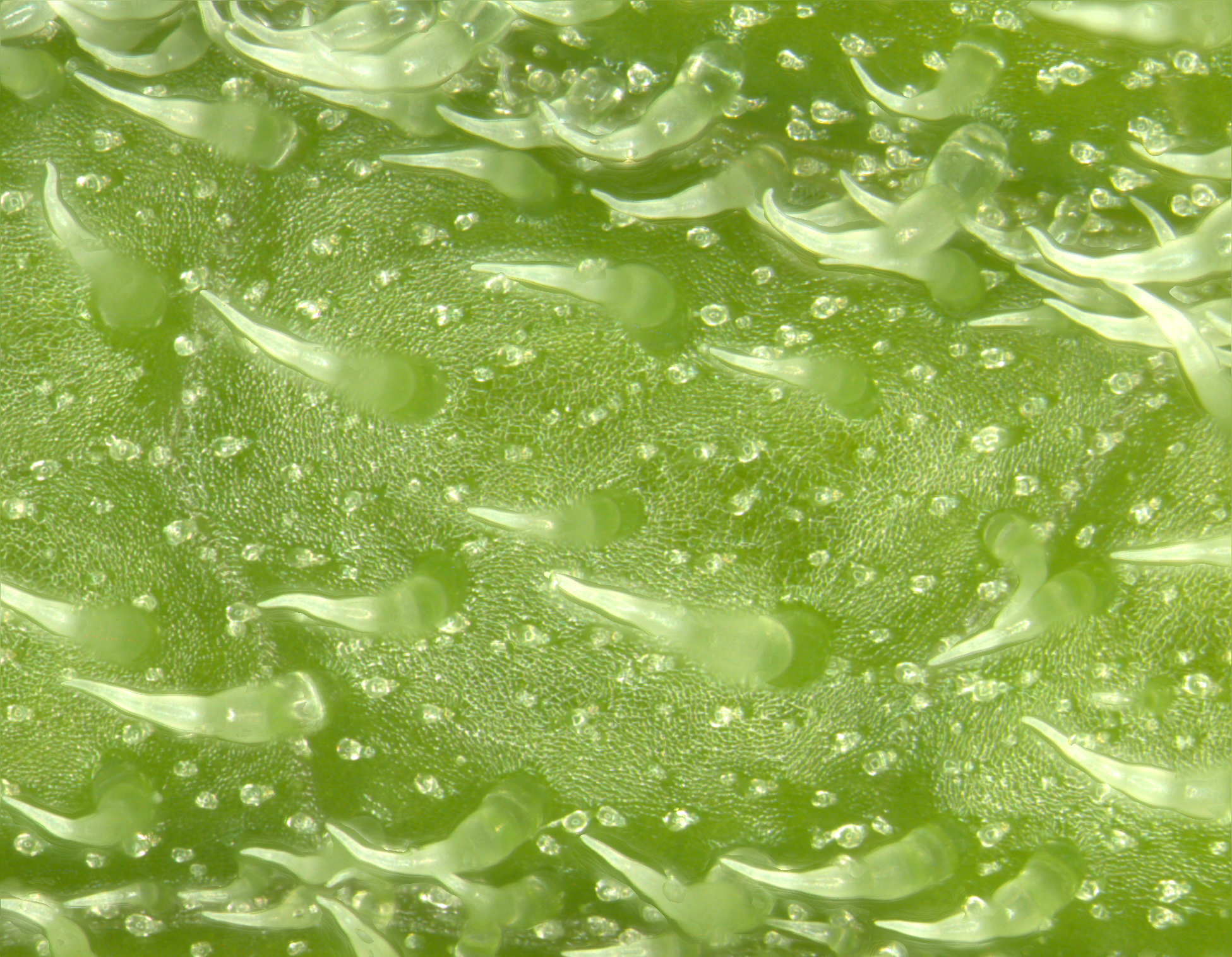
Trichomes on the surface of a Solanum scabrum leaf

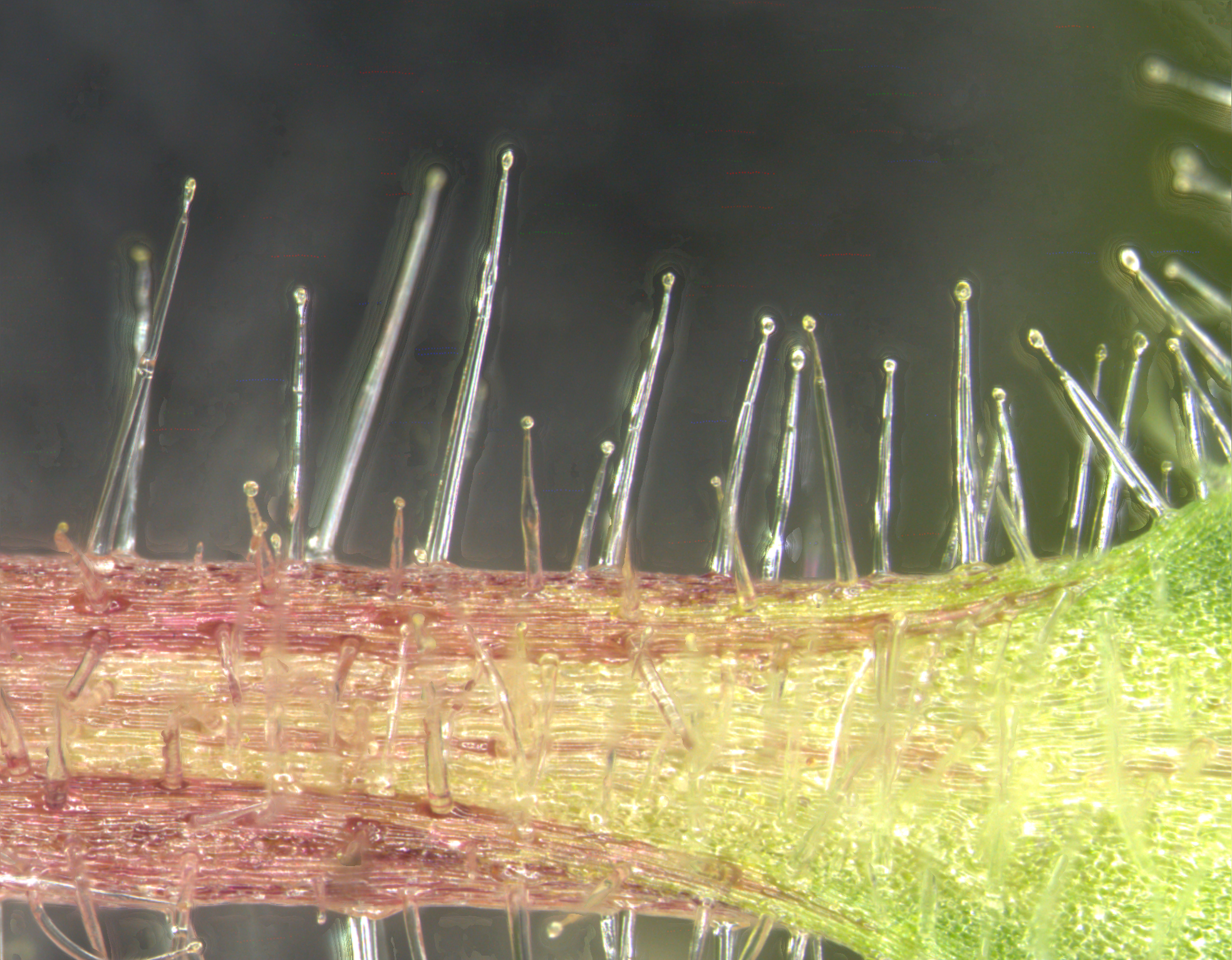
Trichomes on the petiole of a Solanum quitoense leaf

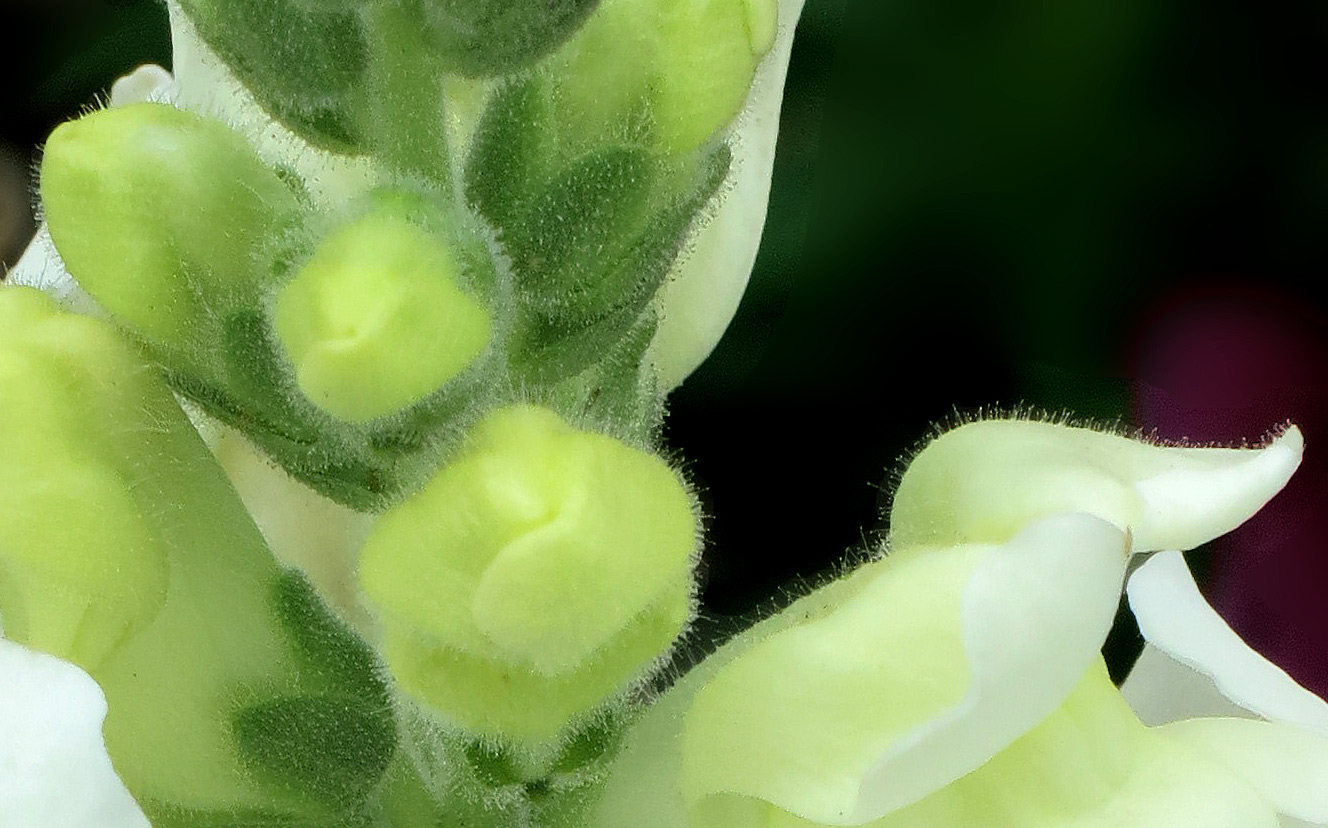
Antirrhinum majus buds with glandular hairs

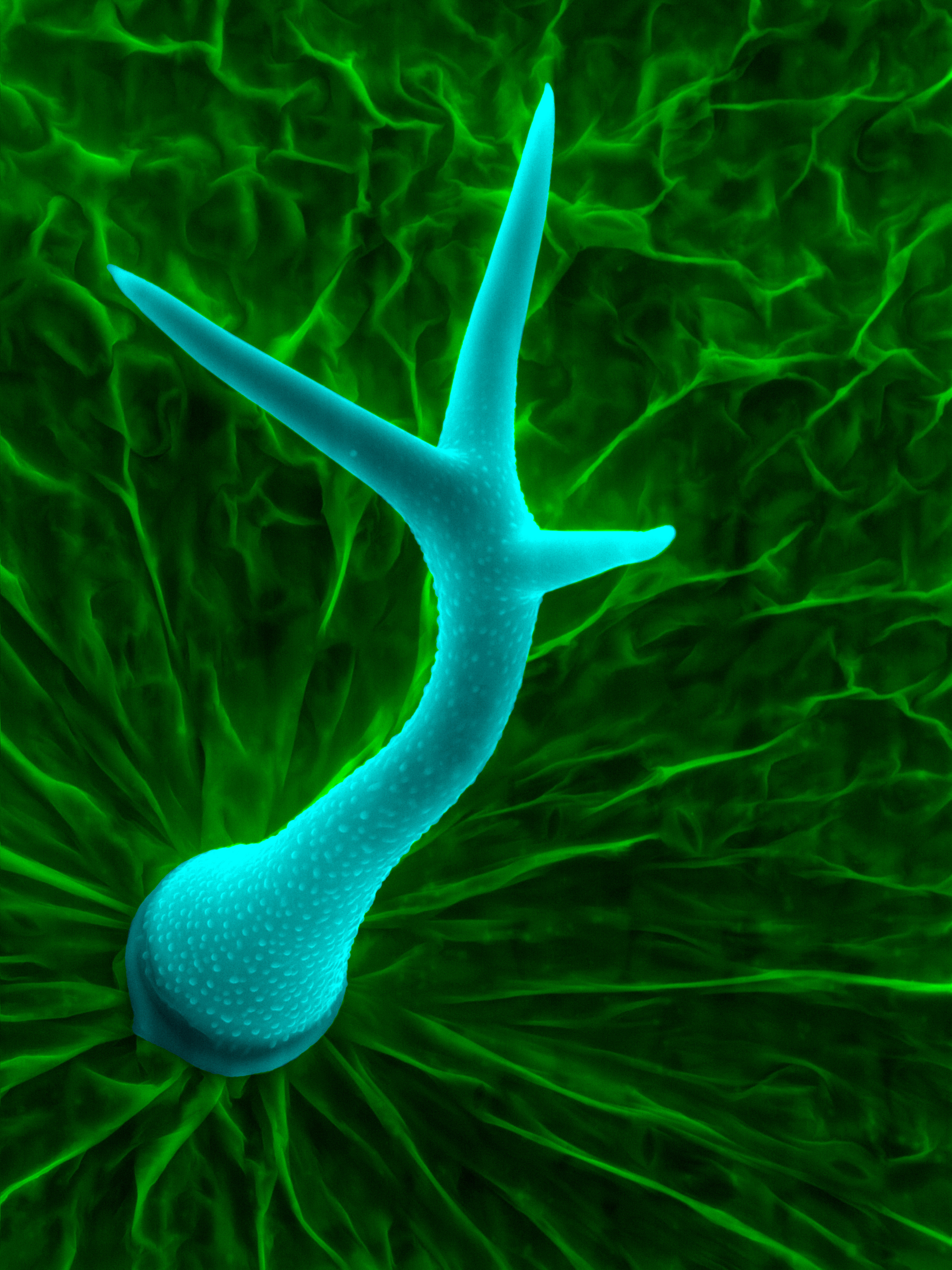
Scanning electron micrograph of a trichome on a leaf of Arabidopsis thaliana; the structure is a single cell.

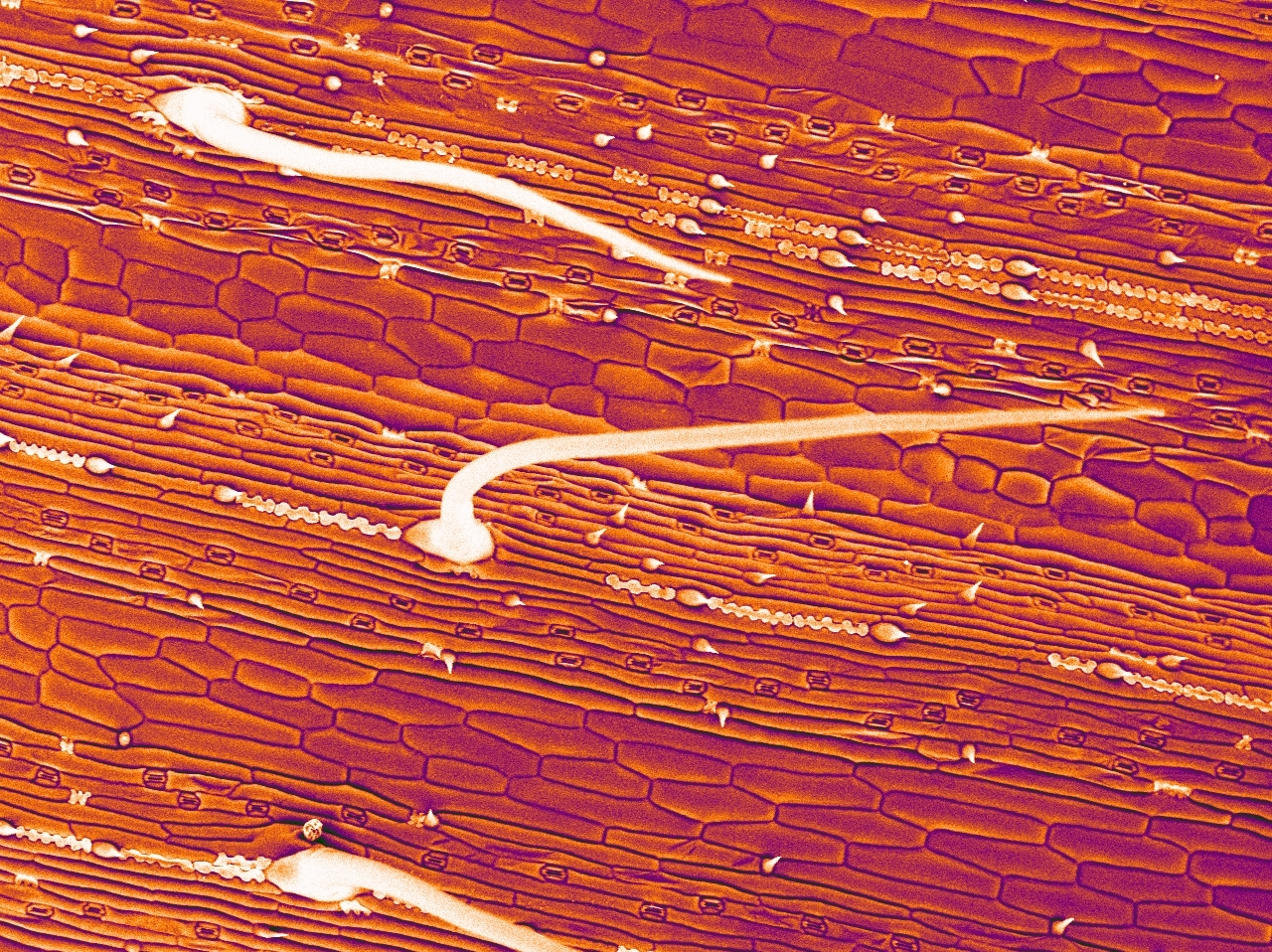
Scanning electron micrograph of leaf hairs on Brachypodium distachyon (250x)

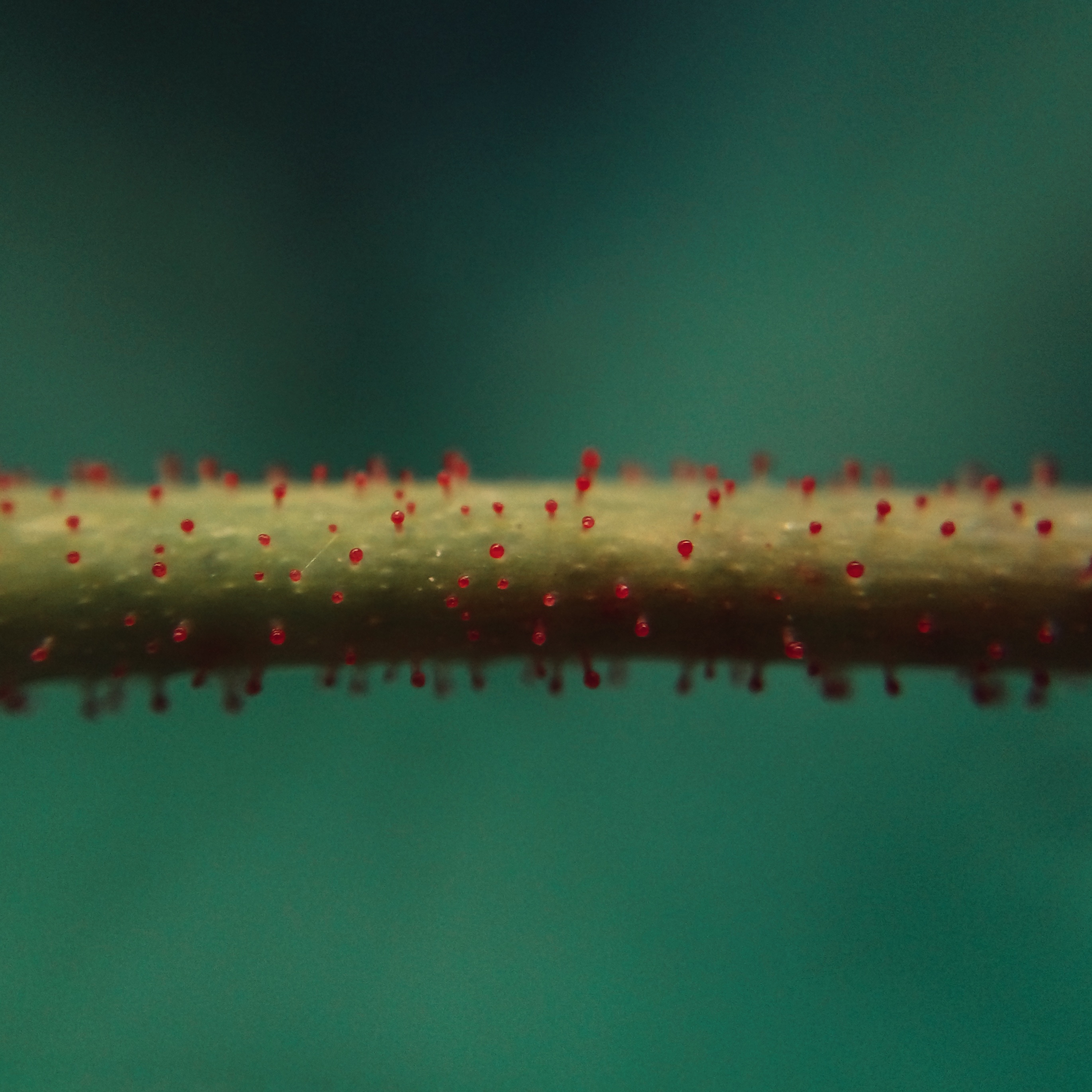
Red glandular trichomes on a rose stem

Plant trichomes have many different features that vary between both species of plants and organs of an individual plant. These features affect the subcategories that trichomes are placed into. Some defining features include the following:

- Unicellular or multicellular
- Straight (upright with little to no branching), spiral (corkscrew-shaped) or hooked (curved apex)
- Presence of cytoplasm
- Glandular (secretory) vs. eglandular
- Tortuous, simple (unbranched and unicellular), peltate (scale-like), stellate (star-shaped)
- Adaxial vs. abaxial, referring to whether trichomes are present, respectively, on the upper surface (adaxial) or lower surface (abaxial) of a leaf or other lateral organ.

In a model organism, Cistus salviifolius, there are more adaxial trichomes present on this plant because this surface suffers from more ultraviolet (UV), solar irradiance light stress than the abaxial surface.

Trichomes can protect the plant from a large range of detriments, such as UV light, insects, transpiration, and freeze intolerance.

=== Aerial surface hairs ===
Trichomes on plants are epidermal outgrowths of various kinds. The terms emergences or prickles refer to outgrowths that involve more than the epidermis. This distinction is not always easily applied (see Wait-a-minute tree). Also, there are nontrichomatous epidermal cells that protrude from the surface, such as root hairs.

A common type of trichome is a hair. Plant hairs may be unicellular or multicellular, and branched or unbranched. Multicellular hairs may have one or several layers of cells. Branched hairs can be dendritic (tree-like) as in kangaroo paw (Anigozanthos), tufted, or stellate (star-shaped), as in Arabidopsis thaliana.

Another common type of trichome is the scale or peltate hair, that has a plate or shield-shaped cluster of cells attached directly to the surface or borne on a stalk of some kind. Common examples are the leaf scales of bromeliads such as the pineapple, Rhododendron and sea buckthorn (Hippophae rhamnoides).

Any of the various types of hairs may be glandular, producing some kind of secretion, such as the essential oils produced by mints and many other members of the family Lamiaceae.

=== Botanical terms for trichome texture ===
Many terms are used to describe the surface appearance of plant organs, such as stems and leaves, referring to the presence, form and appearance of trichomes. Examples include:

- glabrate – almost hairless, having very few trichomes
- glabrous – lacking hairs or trichomes; surface smooth
- hirsute – coarsely hairy
- hispid – having bristly hairs
- articulate – simple pluricellular-uniseriate hairs
- downy – having an almost wool-like covering of long hairs
- pilose – pubescent with long, straight, soft, spreading or erect hairs
- puberulent – minutely pubescent; having fine, short, usually erect, hairs
- puberulous – slightly covered with minute soft and erect hairs
- pubescent – bearing hairs or trichomes of any type
- retrorse, retrorsely – hairs that point backwards
- strigillose – minutely strigose
- strigose – having straight hairs all pointing in more or less the same direction as along a margin or midrib
- tomentellous – minutely tomentose
- tomentose – covered with dense, matted, woolly hairs
- villosulous – minutely villous
- villous – having long, soft hairs, often curved, but not matted

The size, form, density and location of hairs on plants are extremely variable in their presence across species and even within a species on different plant organs. Several basic functions or advantages of having surface hairs can be listed. It is likely that in many cases, hairs interfere with the feeding of at least some small herbivores and, depending upon stiffness and irritability to the palate, large herbivores as well. Hairs on plants growing in areas subject to frost keep the frost away from the living surface cells. In windy locations, hairs break up the flow of air across the plant surface, reducing transpiration. Dense coatings of hairs reflect ozone and UV radiation from sunlight, protecting the more delicate tissues underneath in hot, dry, open habitats. In addition, in locations where much of the available moisture comes from fog drip, hairs appear to enhance this process by increasing the surface area on which water droplets can accumulate.

=== Glandular trichomes ===
Glandular trichomes have been studied extensively and are found on about 30% of plants. Their function is to secrete plant metabolites. Some of these metabolites include:

- terpenoids, which have many functions related to defense, growth, and development
- phenylpropanoids, which have a role in many plant pathways, such as secondary metabolites, stress response, and act as the mediators of plant interactions in the environment
- flavonoids
- methyl ketones
- acylsugars

=== Non-glandular trichomes ===
Non-glandular trichomes serve as structural protection against a variety of abiotic stressors, including water losses, extreme temperatures and UV radiation, and biotic threats, such as pathogen or herbivore attack.

For example, the model plant C. salviifolius is found in areas of high-light stress and poor soil conditions, along the Mediterranean coasts. It contains non-glandular, stellate and dendritic trichomes that have the ability to synthesize and store polyphenols that both affect absorbance of radiation and plant desiccation. These trichomes also contain acetylated flavonoids, which can absorb UV-B, and non-acetylated flavonoids, which absorb the longer wavelength of UV-A. In non-glandular trichomes, the only known role of flavonoids is to block out the shortest wavelengths to protect the plant; this differs from their role in glandular trichomes.

In Salix and gossypium genus, modified trichomes create the cottony fibers that allow anemochory, or wind aided dispersal. These seed trichomes are among the longest plant cells

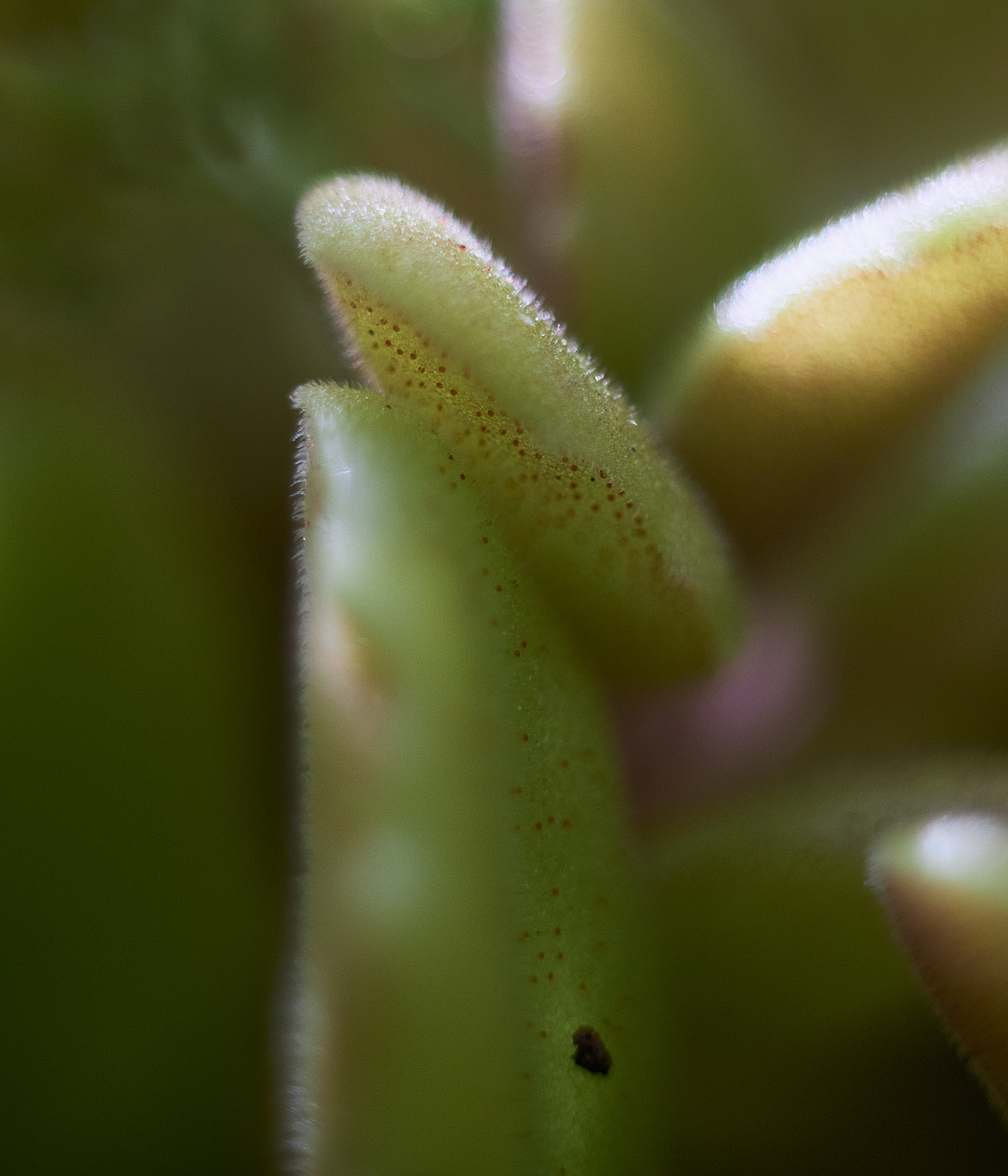

==== Polyphenols ====
Non-glandular trichomes in the genus Cistus were found to contain presences of ellagitannins, glycosides, and kaempferol derivatives. The ellagitannins have the main purpose of helping adapt in times of nutrient-limiting stress.

== Trichome and root hair development ==
Both trichomes and root hairs, the rhizoids of many vascular plants, are lateral outgrowths of a single cell of the epidermal layer. Root hairs form from trichoblasts, the hair-forming cells on the epidermis of a plant root. Root hairs vary between 5 and 17 micrometers in diameter, and 80 to 1,500 micrometers in length (Dittmar, cited in Esau, 1965). Root hairs can survive for two to three weeks and then die off. At the same time new root hairs are continually being formed at the top of the root. This way, the root hair coverage stays the same. It is therefore understandable that repotting must be done with care, because the root hairs are being pulled off for the most part. This is why planting out may cause plants to wilt.

The genetic control of patterning of trichomes and roots hairs shares similar control mechanisms. Both processes involve a core of related transcription factors that control the initiation and development of the epidermal outgrowth. Activation of genes that encode specific protein transcription factors (named GLABRA1 (GL1), GLABRA3 (GL3) and TRANSPARENT TESTA GLABRA1 (TTG1)) are the major regulators of cell fate to produce trichomes or root hairs. When these genes are activated in a leaf epidermal cell, the formation of a trichrome is initiated within that cell. GL1, GL3. and TTG1 also activate negative regulators, which serve to inhibit trichrome formation in neighboring cells. This system controls the spacing of trichomes on the leaf surface. Once trichome are developed they may divide or branch. In contrast, root hairs only rarely branch. During the formation of trichomes and root hairs, many enzymes are regulated. For example, just prior to the root hair development, there is a point of elevated phosphorylase activity.

Many of what scientists know about trichome development comes from the model organism Arabidopsis thaliana, because their trichomes are simple, unicellular, and non-glandular. The development pathway is regulated by three transcription factors: R2R3 MYB, basic helix-loop-helix, and WD40 repeat. The three groups of TFs form a trimer complex (MBW) and activate the expression of products downstream, which activates trichome formation. However, just MYBs alone act as an inhibitor by forming a negative complex.

=== Phytohormones ===
Plant phytohormones have an effect on the growth and response of plants to environmental stimuli. Some of these phytohormones are involved in trichome formation, which include gibberellic acid (GA), cytokinins (CK), and jasmonic acids (JA). GA stimulates growth of trichomes by stimulating GLABROUS1 (GL1); however, both SPINDLY and DELLA proteins repress the effects of GA, so less of these proteins create more trichomes.

Some other phytohormones that promote growth of trichomes include brassinosteroids, ethylene, and salicylic acid. This was understood by conducting experiments with mutants that have little to no amounts of each of these substances. In every case, there was less trichome formation on both plant surfaces, as well as incorrect formation of the trichomes present.

== Significance for taxonomy ==
The type, presence and absence and location of trichomes are important diagnostic characters in plant identification and plant taxonomy. In forensic examination, plants such as Cannabis sativa can be identified by microscopic examination of the trichomes. Although trichomes are rarely found preserved in fossils, trichome bases are regularly found and, in some cases, their cellular structure is important for identification.

=== Arabidopsis thaliana trichome classification ===
Arabidopsis thaliana trichomes are classified as being aerial, epidermal, unicellular, tubular structures.

== Significance for plant molecular biology ==
In the model plant Arabidopsis thaliana, trichome formation is initiated by the GLABROUS1 protein. Knockouts of the corresponding gene lead to glabrous plants. This phenotype has already been used in genome editing experiments and might be of interest as visual marker for plant research to improve gene editing methods such as CRISPR/Cas9. Trichomes also serve as models for cell differentiation as well as pattern formation in plants.

== Uses ==
Bean leaves have been used historically to trap bedbugs in houses in Eastern Europe. The trichomes on the bean leaves capture the insects by impaling their feet (tarsi). The leaves would then be destroyed.

Trichomes are an essential part of nest building for the European wool carder bee (Anthidium manicatum). This bee species incorporates trichomes into their nests by scraping them off of plants and using them as a lining for their nest cavities.

Cannabis trichomes called kief is used to enhance the effects as well as used in the production of hashish

== Defense ==
Plants may use trichomes in order to deter herbivore attacks via physical and/or chemical means, e.g. in specialized, stinging hairs of Urtica (Nettle) species that deliver inflammatory chemicals such as histamine. Studies on trichomes have been focused towards crop protection, which is the result of deterring herbivores (Brookes et al. 2016). However, some organisms have developed mechanisms to resist the effects of trichomes. The larvae of Heliconius charithonia, for example, are able to physically free themselves from trichomes, are able to bite off trichomes, and are able to form silk blankets in order to navigate the leaves better.

=== Stinging trichomes ===
Stinging trichomes vary in their morphology and distribution between species, however similar effects on large herbivores implies they serve similar functions. In areas susceptible to herbivory, higher densities of stinging trichomes were observed. In Urtica, the stinging trichomes induce a painful sensation lasting for hours upon human contact. This sensation has been attributed as a defense mechanism against large animals and small invertebrates, and plays a role in defense supplementation via secretion of metabolites. Studies suggest that this sensation involves a rapid release of toxin (such as histamine) upon contact and penetration via the globular tips of said trichomes.

== See also ==
- Thorns, spines, and prickles
- Colleter (botany)
- Seta
- Urticating hair

== Bibliography ==
- Esau, K. 1965. Plant Anatomy, 2nd Edition. John Wiley & Sons. 767 pp.
