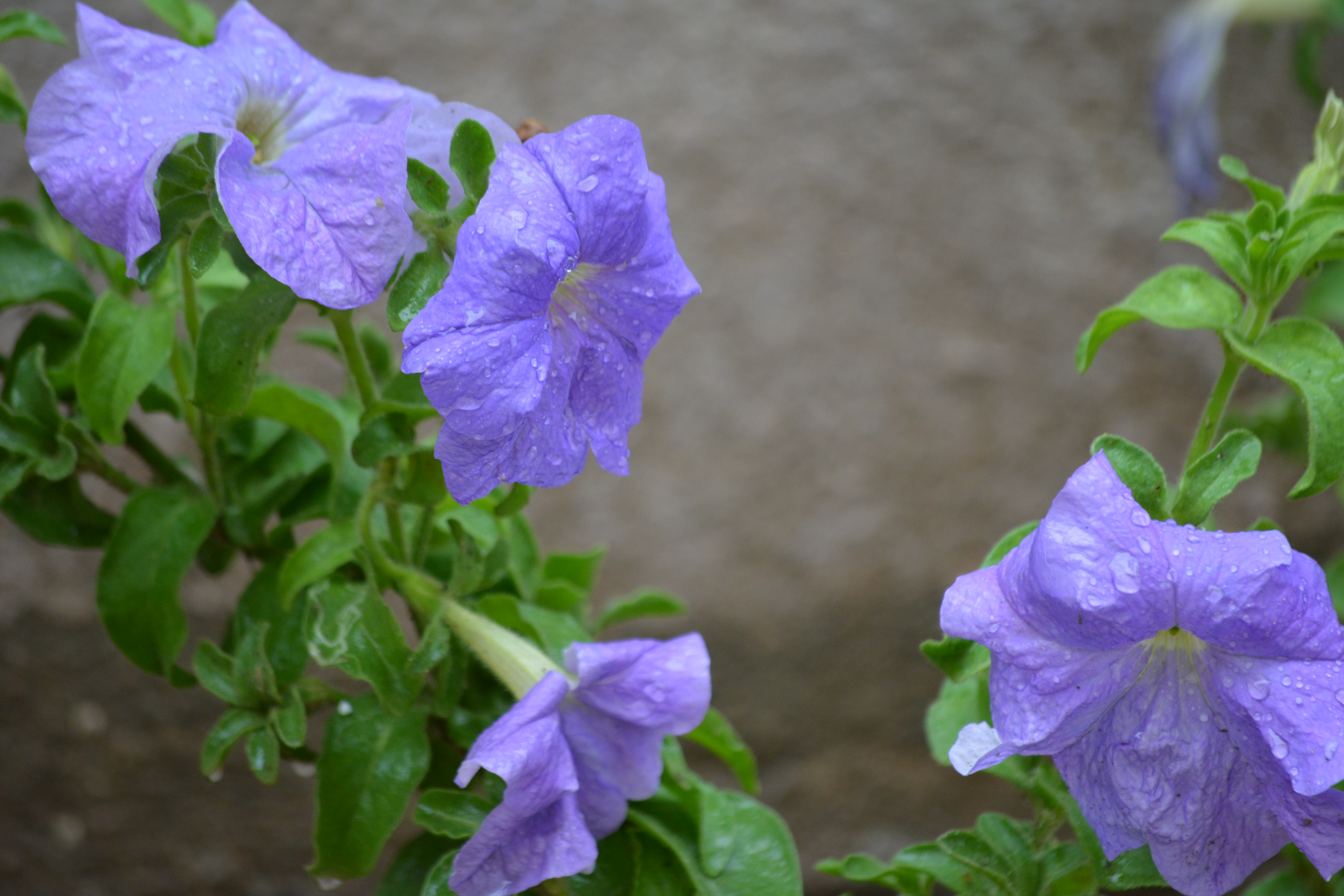

Scientific classification
- Kingdom: Plantae
- Clade: Tracheophytes
- Clade: Angiosperms
- Clade: Eudicots
- Clade: Asterids
- Order: Solanales
- Family: Solanaceae
- Genus: Petunia
- Species: P. integrifolia

Binomial name
- Petunia integrifolia (Hook.) Schinz & Thell.

Synonyms
- Nierembergia phoenicea D. Don; Nierembergia punicea Sendtn.; Petunia dichotoma Sendtn.; Petunia phoenicea D. Don ex Loudon; Petunia violacea Lindl.; Salpiglossis integrifolia Hook.; Stimoryne purpurea Raf.

= Petunia integrifolia =

Species of flowering plant

Petunia integrifolia (syn. Petunia violacea), the violet petunia or violetflower petunia, is a species of wild petunia with violet-colored blooms. Petunia integrifolia is native to Brazil, Argentina, Paraguay and Uruguay.

P. integrifolia bears flowers approximately 1.5 inch in diameter and the plant is typically smaller and harder to cultivate than the well-known hybrid bedding Petunia now known correctly as Petunia × atkinsiana.

== Taxonomy ==
The species was first described as Salpiglossis integrifolia by William Jackson Hooker in 1831. It was transferred to the genus Petunia as P. integrifolia by Hans Schinz and Albert Thellung in 1915. Petunia inflata had sometimes been considered to be a subspecies of P. integrifolia, but the two have different native ranges, with P. inflata growing in more northern areas.

== Hallucinogen ==
Petunia violacea Lindl. has been reported to be used as a hallucinogen in Ecuador, where the plant has the vernacular name shanín. The drug is said to cause sensations of levitation and flight – a type of hallucination often associated with the use of the antimuscarinic drugs such as the Atropa belladonna based flying ointments of Medieval and Early Modern Europe.
