= Juvenile hormone =

Class of chemical compounds

Juvenile hormones (JHs) are a group of acyclic sesquiterpenoids that regulate many aspects of insect physiology. The first discovery of a JH was by Vincent Wigglesworth. JHs regulate development, reproduction, diapause, and polyphenisms.

In insects, JH (formerly neotenin) refers to a group of hormones, which ensure growth of the larva, while preventing metamorphosis. Because of their rigid exoskeleton, insects grow in their development by successively shedding their exoskeleton (a process known as molting).

Juvenile hormones are secreted by a pair of endocrine glands behind the brain called the corpora allata. JHs are also important for the production of eggs in female insects.

JH was isolated in 1965 by Karel Sláma and Carroll Williams and the first molecular structure of a JH was solved in 1967.

Most insect species contain only juvenile growth hormone (JH) III. To date JH 0, JH I, and JH II have been identified only in the Lepidoptera (butterflies and moths). The form JHB_{3} (JH III bisepoxide) appears to be the most important JH in the Diptera, or flies. Certain species of crustaceans have been shown to produce and secrete methyl farnesoate, which is juvenile hormone III lacking the epoxide group. Methyl farnesoate is believed to play a role similar to that of JH in crustaceans.

Being a sesquiterpenoid, JH chemical structure differs significantly from the structures of other animal hormones. Some JH analogs have been found in conifers.

== Control of development ==
The primary control of juvenile hormone is by 1) the stimulation of the corpora allata by allatotropins short peptides which bind to G-protein coupled receptors, which signal the glands to produce JH, and 2), the inhibition of JH production by allatostatins. These fall into three classes: allatostatin A, allatostatin B, and allatostatin C (for a review of these control mechanisms see: Stay and Woodhead 1993). Secondary control of the JH titre found in the haemolymph of the developing insect is metabolic inactivation of JH by JH-specific esterase and juvenile hormone epoxide hydrolase. During ecdysis the form of the old cuticle laid down before the next moult is controlled by the JH level in the insect. JH maintains a juvenile state. The level gradually decreases during the development of the insect, allowing it to proceed to successive instars with each molt.

This has been demonstrated in various studies, most prominently that by V. B. Wigglesworth in 1960s. In this study, two adult Rhodnius had their blood systems linked, ensuring that the JH titre in both would be equal. One was a third instar Rhodnius, the other was a fourth instar. When the corpora allata of the third instar insect were removed, the level of JH was equal in both insects to that in the fourth instar animal, and hence both proceeded to the fifth instar at the next moult. When the fourth instar Rhodnius had its corpora allata removed, both contained a third instar level of JH and hence one proceeded to instar four, and the other remained at this instar.

Generally, the removal of the corpora allata from juveniles will result in a diminutive adult at the next moult. Implantation of corpora allata into last larval instars will boost JH levels and hence produce a supernumerary (extra) juvenile instar.

== In honey bees ==
There is a complex interaction between JH, the hormone ecdysone and vitellogenin. In the development stage, as long as there is enough JH, the ecdysone promotes larva-to-larva molts. With lower amounts of JH, ecdysone promotes pupation. Complete absence of JH results in formation of the adult. In adult honey bees, JH and vitellogenin titers in general show an inverse pattern.

JH titers in worker honey bees progressively increase through the first 15 or so days of the worker's life before the onset of foraging. During the first 15 days, workers perform tasks inside the hive, such as nursing larvae, constructing comb, and cleaning cells. JH titers peak around day 15; workers this age guard, remove dead bees from the colony, and fan at the colony entrance to cool the nest. Aggressiveness of guard bees is correlated with their blood JH levels. Even though guards have high JH levels, their ovaries are relatively undeveloped. JH does not activate foraging; rather, it is involved in controlling the pace at which bees develop into foragers.

JH has been known to be involved in the queen-worker caste differentiation during the larval stage. The unique negative relationship between JH and Vitellogenin may be important to understanding of queen longevity.

== In Lepidoptera ==
JH in many butterfly and moth species are necessary for the production and release of the sex pheromone by females. Experiments conducted in Mythimna unipuncta (true armyworm moth) and Agrotis ipsilon (black cutworm moth) have shown that removing the corpus allata, which secretes JH, stops all release of sex pheromone. Furthermore, JH is important for ovarian development. In the black cutworm, it was shown that JH is also necessary in males for pheromone responsiveness. JH has also been shown to be transferred from the male to the female Heliothis virescens during copulation.

== Forms ==
all juvenile hormones

- Methyl farnesoate
  - CAS methyl (2E,6E)-3,7,11-trimethyl-2,6,10-dodecatrienoate
  - Formula: C_{16}H_{26}O_{2}
- Juvenile hormone 0 (found in Lepidoptera)
  - CAS methyl (2E,6E)-10R,11S-(oxiranyl)-3,7-diethyl-11-methyl-2,6-tridecadienoate
  - Formula: C_{19}H_{32}O_{3}
- Juvenile hormone I (found in Lepidoptera)
  - CAS methyl (2E,6E)-10R,11S-(oxiranyl)-7-ethyl-3,11-dimethyl-2,6-tridecadienoate
  - Formula: C_{18}H_{30}O_{3}
- Juvenile hormone II (found in Lepidoptera)
  - CAS methyl (2E,6E)-10R,11S-(oxiranyl)-3,7,11-trimethyl-2,6-tridecadienoate
  - Formula: C_{17}H_{28}O_{3}
  - CAS methyl (2E,6E)-10R-(oxiranyl)-3,7,11-trimethyl-2,6-dodecadienoate
  - Formula: C_{16}H_{26}O_{3}
- Juvenile hormone JHB3 (found in diptera)
  - CAS methyl (2E,6E)-6S,7S,10R-(dioxiranyl)-3,7,11-trimethyl-2-dodecaenoate
  - Formula: C_{16}H_{26}O_{4}

== Use as an insecticide ==
Synthetic analogues of the juvenile hormone, juvenile hormone mimics, are used as an insecticide, preventing the larvae from developing into adult insects. JH itself is expensive to synthesize and is unstable in light. At high levels of JH, larvae can still molt, but the result will only be a bigger larva, not an adult. Thus the insect's reproductive cycle is broken. One JH analogue, methoprene, is approved by the WHO for use in drinking water cisterns to control mosquito larvae due to its exceptionally low toxicity (LD50 >35,000 mg/kg in the rat).

== Regulation ==
Juvenile hormone is produced in the corpora allata of insects. JH will disperse throughout the haemolymph and act on responsive tissues. JH is principally degraded by the enzymes juvenile-hormone esterase (JHE) or juvenile hormone epoxide hydrolase (JHEH). JHE and JHEH both lead to suppression of JH signaling and response. Tissues responsive to JH may produce one or both of these enzymes.

JH stimulates the accessory glands of adult males, promoting gland growth and the production of accessory gland secretion. Yolk production (vitellogenesis) in female ovaries is also stimulated by JH action. JH may also regulate reproductive behaviour in both sexes.

== Metabolism ==
Juvenile hormone's activity is destroyed by two enzymes. JH esterase cleaves the methyl ester giving JH acid. JH acid is attached by JH epoxide hydrolase, which converts the epoxide group to a diol. The order of cleavage depends on the order of insect. In the Lepidoptera, the order is as given here; ester cleavage preceding epoxide hydration. Either one terminates the activity of the hormone. JH diol acid, the product of both enzymes, is acted on by JH diol kinase to increase the solubility for excretion.

=== Biosynthesis ===
The biosynthesis of JH is similar to that of cholesterol in animals. There are considerable differences between the biosynthesis of the homo-isoprenoid JHs found almost exclusively in Lepidoptera, as opposed to the isoprenoid JH III, JH III bisepoxide, and methyl farnesoate found in other insects.

Cholesterol biosynthesis has been exhaustively studied in animals. All steps occur in the cytosol. The starting material is citrate, which is exported by the mitochondrion when metabolic fuels are high. It is converted into acetyl-CoA, ADP, CO_{2}, and oxaloacetate by ATP-citrate lyase, together with ATP and CoASH as substrates. Three acetyl-CoAs are converted into HMG-CoA by the cytosolic isoforms of thiolase and 3-hydroxy-3-methylglutaryl-CoA synthase. The HMG-CoA is then reduced by NADPH to mevalonate by HMG-CoA reductase, the rate controlling enzyme of cholesterol biosynthesis. This enzyme has eight helical domains anchoring it in the Golgi membrane of the ER; the catalytic domain is in the cytosol. It is strongly inhibited by the statins, a class of drugs based on a mold metabolite which, at least at one time, were the largest selling class of drugs in the world. Mevalonate is acted on by a series of three kinases to give the highly labile 1,2-diphosphomevalonate-3-phosphate, which is acted on by a lyase to give phosphate, CO_{2}, and isopentenyl diphosphate. Isopentenyl diphosphate isomerase converts the latter to the less stable dimethylallyl diphosphate. Farnesyl diphosphate synthase takes one DMAPP and two IPP to give the C_{15} metabolite farnesyl diphosphate. There are a large number of additional steps to generate cholesterol from IPP, the ubiquitous precursor of all isoprenoids.

It appears that the biosynthesis of JH III is identical to that of cholesterol, from production of IPP to FPP, although there appear to be no studies on export of citrate or other metabolites from the mitochondrion into the cytosol, or formation of acetyl-CoA. The enzymes of this pathway were first studied in Manduca sexta, which produces both homoisoprenoid and isoprenoid (JHIII) JHs.

Very early on propionate was shown to incorporate very highly efficiently into JH II and JH I in cell free extracts of M. sexta corpora allata. Mevalonate and acetate also incorporate into JH I, II, JH III from M. sexta, albeit far less efficiently that propionate. Jennings et al. showed that homomevalonate incorporates into JH II in M. sexta. Baker identified 3-hydroxy-3-ethylglutarate and 3-hydroxy-3-methylglutarate from the same enzyme source incubated with acetyl and propionyl-CoA. Lee et al. showed that the same source of enzymes efficiently make both mevalonate and its 3-ethyl homolog, homomevalonate. Bergot showed that the mevalonate and homomevalonate produced by these enzymes has the same 3S optical isomer configuration as the vertebrate enzymes. Baker showed that isopentenyl diphosphate, and its homolog, 3-ethyl-butenyl diphosphate (homoisopentenyl diphosphate) are metabolized to their corresponding allyic diphosphates, DMAPP and homoDMAPP (3-ethyl-3-methylallyl diphosphate). The latter is required for biosynthesis of JH I, JH II, and 4-methylJH I. 2 units of homoDMAPP are required for JH I and 4methyl JH I biosynthesis, and one for JH II biosynthesis.

All parts of the carbon skeleton comes from IPP. Then an enzyme prenyl transferase/farnesyl diphosphate synthase binds IPP, strips the diphosphate off it to give an allylic carbocation, and adds this to an IPP to give geranyl diphosphate (C_{10}). Then it does the same thing to geranyl diphosphate, giving farnesyl diphosphate (C_{15}). This reaction appears to be the only known enzymatic reaction involving the coupling of two molecules with a carbocation. The free electron pair adds to the double bond of IPP, also isomerizing IPP so that the product is an allylic diphosphate. Thus, this part of the isoprenoid pathway appears nearly identical with that of cholesterol with the exception of the insect specific homoisoprenoid units. NAD+-dependent farnesol dehydrogenase, a corpora allata enzyme involved in juvenile hormone synthesis showed that the same source of enzymes efficiently make both mevalonate and its 3-ethyl homolog, homomevalonate.

Absolute configuration of homomevalonate and 3-hydroxy-3-ethylglutaryl and 3-hydroxy-3-methylglutaryl coenzyme a, produced by cell-free extracts of insect corpora allata. A cautionary note on prediction of absolute stereochemistry based on liquid chromatographic elution order of diastereomeric derivatives. showed that the mevalonate and homomevalonate produced by these enzymes has the same 3S optical isomer configuration as the vertebrate enzymes showed that isopentenyl diphosphate, and its homolog, 3-ethyl-butenyl diphosphate (homoisopentenyl diphosphate) are metabolized to their corresponding allyic diphosphates, DMAPP and homoDMAPP (3-ethyl-3-methylallyl diphosphate). The latter is required for biosynthesis of JH I, JH II, and 4-methylJH I. 2 units of homoDMAPP are required for JH I and 4methyl JH I biosynthesis, and one for JH II biosynthesis.

However, at this point these pathways diverge. While the vast majority of farnesyl diphosphate is converted into ultimately cholesterol in animals, in insects it is apparently acting on by a diphosphatase to give farnesol, which in turn is acted on by an NAD+ dependent enzyme, farnesol/farnesal dehydrogenase in M. sexta to give farnesoic acid. Subsequent work has shown that the enzyme is highly specific for trans allylic alcohols with at least three isoprene units, and to also be present in mosquitoes.

The next steps of JH biosynthesis differ between orders. In Lepidoptera and mosquitoes farnesoic acid or its homologs is epoxidized by a P450 dependent farnesoic acid methyl epoxidase, then it is methylated by a JH acid methyl transferase In most orders, farnesoic acid is methylated by farensoic acid methyl transferase, and then is epoxidized by a P450 dependent methyl transferas.

A recent publication by Nouzova et al. (2015) shows that allatostatin C, the peptide which inhibits JH production by the corpora allata, blocks the transport of citrate out of the mitochondrion in Aedes aegypti. This is a very logical control mechanism for JH biosynthesis.

== See also ==
- Insect growth regulator
- Neoteny
