= Z-farnesyl diphosphate synthase =

Class of enzymes

Identifiers
- EC no.: 2.5.1.68

Databases
- IntEnz: IntEnz view
- BRENDA: BRENDA entry
- ExPASy: NiceZyme view
- KEGG: KEGG entry
- MetaCyc: metabolic pathway
- PRIAM: profile
- PDB structures: RCSB PDB PDBe PDBsum
Search
- PMC: articles
- PubMed: articles
- NCBI: proteins

In enzymology, a Z-farnesyl diphosphate synthase (EC 2.5.1.68) is an enzyme that catalyzes the chemical reaction

geranyl diphosphate + isopentenyl diphosphate $\rightleftharpoons$ diphosphate + (2Z,6E)-farnesyl diphosphate

Thus, the two substrates of this enzyme are geranyl diphosphate and isopentenyl diphosphate, whereas its two products are diphosphate and (2Z,6E)-farnesyl diphosphate.

This enzyme belongs to the family of transferases, specifically those transferring aryl or alkyl groups other than methyl groups. The systematic name of this enzyme class is geranyl-diphosphate:isopentenyl-diphosphate geranylcistransferase. This enzyme is also called (Z)-farnesyl diphosphate synthase.
