= Solanum habrochaites =

Scientific classification
- Kingdom: Plantae
- Clade: Embryophytes
- Clade: Tracheophytes
- Clade: Angiosperms
- Clade: Eudicots
- Clade: Asterids
- Order: Solanales
- Family: Solanaceae
- Genus: Solanum
- Species: S. habrochaites

Binomial name
- Solanum habrochaites S.Knapp & D.M.Spooner

Synonyms
- List: Lycopersicon agrimoniifolium Sendtn.; Lycopersicon agrimoniifolium Dunal; Lycopersicon diadelphum Dunal; Lycopersicon hirsutum Dunal; Lycopersicon hirsutum Kunth; Lycopersicon hirsutum var. agrimoniifolium Luckwill; Lycopersicon hirsutum f. glabratum C.H.Müll.; Lycopersicon hirsutum var. glabratum (C.H.Müll.) Luckwill; Solanum agrimoniifolium (Luckwill) J.F.Macbr.

Species of flowering plant

Solanum habrochaites (syn. Lycopersicon hirsutum), the hairy tomato, is a species of flowering plant in the family Solanaceae, native to Ecuador and Peru. It is considered to be one of the most important sources of genetic variation for crop improvement of the cultivated tomato, Solanum lycopersicum.
