= Juvenile-hormone esterase =

Class of enzymes

Juvenile hormone esterase
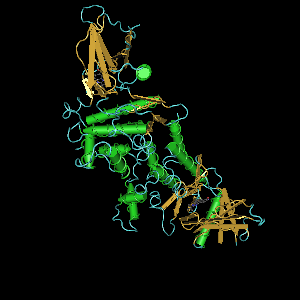

Identifiers
- EC no.: 3.1.1.59
- CAS no.: 50812-15-2

Databases
- BRENDA: enzyme data
- ExPASy: NiceZyme view
- KEGG: enzyme entry
- MetaCyc: metabolic pathway
- Rhea: reactions
- PDB structures: RCSB PDB PDBe PDBsum
- Gene Ontology: AmiGO / QuickGO
Search
- PMC: articles
- PubMed: articles
- NCBI: proteins

The enzyme juvenile hormone esterase (EC 3.1.1.59, systematic name methyl-(2E,6E,10R)-10,11-epoxy-3,7,11-trimethyltrideca-2,6-dienoate acylhydrolase, JH esterase) catalyzes the hydrolysis of juvenile hormone:

juvenile hormone I
H_{2}O
CH_{3}OH
juvenile hormone I acid

Or, similalarly,

juvenile hormone III + H_{2}O = juvenile hormone III acid + methanol

== Nomenclature and function ==
This enzyme belongs to the family of hydrolases, specifically those acting on carboxylic ester bonds. The systematic name of this enzyme class is methyl-(2E,6E)-(10R,11S)-10,11-epoxy-3,7,11-trimethyltrideca-2,6-dienoate acylhydrolase. Other names in common use include JH esterase, juvenile hormone esterase, and juvenile hormone carboxyesterase.

Juvenile hormone (JH) controls insect metamorphosis. High JH titers maintain the larval state while a decrease in the JH titer initiates the pupation sequence as well as a change in tissue commitment away from synthesis of larval tissues to pupal tissues at the pupal stage. The drop in JH titer at the beginning of the last larval instar in the Lepidoptera appears to be due to a combination of increased metabolism and decreased synthesis. In the Lepidoptera, JH is initially metabolized by ester hydrolysis; esterases capable of hydrolyzing JH are detectable in the hemolymph at times during the last larval instar that appear to coincide with reported drops in the JH titre. The JHE's are also selective for the 2E methyl ester of the naturally occurring JH's. These studies suggest that the JHE's may be important in the regulation of the JH titre and therefore involved in the initiation of and the commitment to the pupal stage. JHE's appear to be produced by the fat body and this production can be stimulated by exogenous JH in Hyalophora pupae, a stage devoid of JHE activity. Stimulation of JHE activity by JH has also been noted recently in adults of Leptinotarsa decemlineata and pupae of Galleria mellonella. However, to date, no reported studies have examined this phenomenon during the last larval instar when these enzymes are thought to be of primary importance. Thus this laboratory undertook an investigation of the hemolymph JHE regulation during the last larval instar of the cabbage looper, Trichoplusia ni.

== JH esterase induction ==
Juvenile hormone esterase is induced by factors naturally occurring in the head of insects. In addition, it is induced by treatment of insects with either natural juvenile hormone, with JH I being the most potent inducer. Synthetic agonists of JH have been shown to possess this same activity, albeit at a lower potency than JH I. In another study, it has been shown that factors present in the head of the insect are potent inducers of JH activity. Starvation of lepidopteran larvae also induces appearance of JH esterase.

== JH esterase inhibitors ==
A number of compounds have been discovered which are potent inhibitors of JH esterase. Many of these are insecticides falling into two major structural groups, the phosphoamidothiolates and S-phenylphosphates; carbamate insecticides were also tested. By far the most potent inhibitor was an ethoxythiophenylphospamidothiolate, with IC_{50} < 1 nM. Of particular interest in this study is that ethyl and isopropyl analogs of natural JHs were NOT cleaved by the esterase, showing that it is methyl ester specific. JH I and JH III were tested at nominal concentrations of 5 μM. Later a trifluoromethyl ketone (3-octylthio-1,1,1-trifluoro-2-propanone) was shown to be a highly potent, high affinity slow, tight binding inhibitor of the JH esterase of Trichoplusia ni, the same Lepidopteran which was used in the other study in this section. This study reported very sophisticated kinetic analyses of the inhibition of this compound (acronym OTFP), JH I was shown to be degraded more readily by the enzyme than JH III, with a Km value about twice the value of JH III.

== JH esterase fluctuations with time and relation to insect development ==
JH esterase and JH epoxide hydrolase are crucial in terminating the action of JH. The role of juvenile hormone binding proteins are also important, as they afford juvenile hormone protection from hydrolytic enzymes. This makes for a very complicated scenario that is difficult to investigate, and also difficult to distinguish between different species. Very detailed studies have been done on JH, JH acid, ecdysone, and JH titers have been done in precisely timed larvae of Manduca sexta as a function of development during the fifth larval stadium. In these larvae the principle JH are JH I, and JH II, with low levels of JH 0 and JH III. There is a large peak of JH I and II at the end of the fourth stadium, accompanied by lower levels of their acid metabolites. Then a broad peak of JH esterase starts on day 1.5 to day 4. Subsequently, ecdysteroid titers rise slightly on day 3.5, then a massive peak of ecdysteroid starting on day 5 persisting at somewhat lower levels to day 5. This is accompanied by a sharp peak of JH I and JH II, beginning on day 4 and ending on day 6. JH I acid titers are almost the same as JH I titer, except on day 7 when is a sharp peak of only JH I acid. This is just as ecdysteroid titers are decreasing. A very similar timing of peaks of JH esterase and ecdysone has been observed in Galleria mellonella. These data are consistent with a classical model for lepidopterans where JH is high at each larval molt, but must rise together with ecdysone prior to pupation to initiate the pupal molt. They are also consistent with a model advanced by others that corpora allata maintained in vitro of day 0 M. sexta larva secrete high levels of JH, but that the shift to producing only JH acid at day 4, which is then methylated by imaginal discs to generate the JH peak. However, secretion of the relative amounts of JH produced by CA of Manduca sexta has been found to differ considerably from in vivo titers. Investigation of JH titers in Trichoplusia ni have led to very similar conclusions as regards the timing of pulses of JH temporally and with respect to edysone secretion. However, the principle JH in this species is JH II. Injection of an esterase inhibitor, EPPAT, was found to increase juvenile hormone titers, and starvation was found to increase juvenile hormone titers. In addition, parasitization of larvae with Chelonus sp. (Hymenoptera) was found to decrease JH II titers, but to cause an increase in JH III titers, apparently derived from the parasite.

=== JH esterase protein structure ===
The crystal structure of esterase from the tobacco hornworm Manduca sexta has been solved in complex with the transition state analogue inhibitor 3-octylthio-1,1,1-trifluoropropan-2-one (OTFP) covalently bound to the active site. This crystal structure contains a long, hydrophobic binding pocket with the solvent-inaccessible catalytic triad located at the end. The structure explains many of the interactions observed between JHE and its substrates and inhibitors, such as the preference for methyl esters vs. ethyl or isopropyl esters, and long hydrophobic backbones. The enzyme is extremely efficient, with a cat/Km of at least 3 x 107 M-1 s-1. The primary sequence is 583 amino acids long, with a 22 amino acid protein. The calculated Mr of the active form is 62.1 kDa.
