= Streptosolen =

Scientific classification
- Kingdom: Plantae
- Clade: Tracheophytes
- Clade: Angiosperms
- Clade: Eudicots
- Clade: Asterids
- Order: Solanales
- Family: Solanaceae
- Subfamily: Cestroideae
- Tribe: Browallieae
- Genus: Streptosolen; Miers (1850)
- Species: S. jamesonii

Binomial name
- Streptosolen jamesonii (Benth.) Miers (1850)

Synonyms
- Browallia jamesonii Benth. (1845); Streptosolen benthamii Miers (1850), nom. superfl.

Species of plant

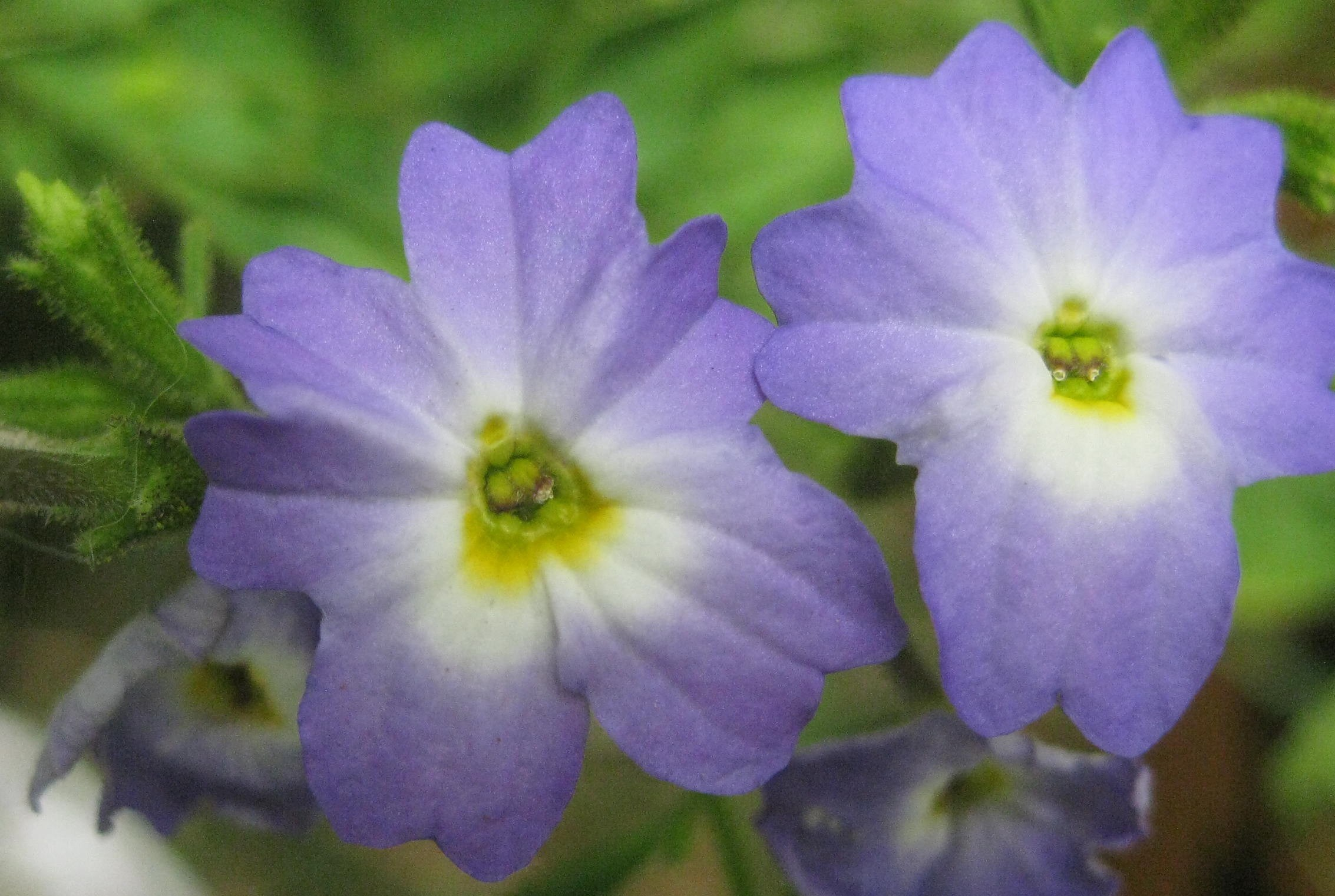
Close-up of flowers of Browallia americana : Streptosolen jamesonii was placed initially in the closely related genus Browallia and is still sometimes known familiarly as "Orange Browallia".

Streptosolen is a monotypic genus of flowering plants in the family Solanaceae. It is closely related to the genus Browallia, within which it was originally placed. The single species, Streptosolen jamesonii, the marmalade bush or fire bush, is an evergreen shrub bearing loose clusters of flowers which change gradually from yellow to red as they develop, resulting in an overall appearance resembling orange marmalade (whence the name), found in open woodlands in Colombia, Venezuela, Ecuador, and Peru. The plant has become naturalized in certain localities in Hawaii.

The red colouration (at maturity) of the flowers of Streptosolen jamesonii is typical of that of bird-pollinated flowers, as also is their lack of a strong scent and secretion of a great deal of nectar. The iridescent green hummingbird species Chlorostilbon poortmani, the short-tailed emerald, is a frequent visitor to the flowers of Streptosolen jamesonii, pollinating them as it hovers to sip their nectar. The plant is, however, also pollinated by certain species of carpenter bee belonging to the genus Neoxylocopa (see image below in subsection re. pollination).

== Names ==
In its native Ecuador, the plant has the Spanish common names flor de quinde ('hummingbird flower'), flor del sol ('flower of the sun') and jaboncillo ('little soap'). Note: the South American Spanish word quinde (hummingbird) is derived from the Quechua word quindi, having the same meaning. The word passed into Spanish because there was no pre-existing Spanish word for a family of birds found only in the New World.

Hunziker (2001) gives the further common names for the plant in Ecuador nacha, agua de oro ('water of gold'), and guizcho de bosque.

Two other English vernacular names sometimes applied to the shrub are Orange Browallia and Yellow Heliotrope shrub

== Description ==
Straggling, evergreen, shrub, clothed in rough, short hairs, 1.5–2 m in height, densely branched, bearing abundant glandular trichomes. Stems generally tall and slender. Leaves ovate to elliptic, petiolate, subcoriaceous, green to dark green, with a pattern of fine wrinkles, lower surfaces of blades with prominent nerves, the upper surface lacking stomata.

Flowers borne in subcorymbose cymes; pedicels 5–16 mm long; calyx tubular, zygomorphic, netted with nerves, 8–10 mm long, 4–5-toothed, teeth unequal and shorter than tube; corolla funnel-shaped, zygomorphic, 20–30 mm long, golden-yellow, maturing to golden-reddish, tube slender, spirally contorted, not ventricose, limb rather narrow, up to 18 mm, somewhat slanted, 5-lobed, lobes broad and very short, apiculate or emarginate; the four stamens (the anterior one missing) with piliferous filaments, the upper lateral pair with short filaments (circa 3 mm long) and smaller anthers attached at the upper two thirds or three quarters of the corolla, the lower posterior pair with long filaments (circa 12 mm long), attached near the basal quarter of the corolla, and with bigger anthers (2.5 x 1.8 mm); pollen grains oblate-sphaeroidal, medium-sized; nectary annular, thick. Seed capsules globose, ovate, circa 5mm long, bearing 60–80 seeds. Seeds 0.6–0.9–mm long, cuboidal-elongated, testa reticulate.

The blooms can appear nearly all year in mild-winter areas, but the heaviest flowering is from February to July.

The corolla has been described as 'essentially upside-down' (due to the twisted nature of the corolla tube - that gives the genus its name) by botanists from the Natural History Museum, London.

=== Influence of flower colour and nectar secretion on pollination ===
The hummingbird Chlorostilbon poortmani, principal avian pollinator of S. jamesonii

Iridescent, blue-black, Peruvian carpenter bee (genus Xylocopa - X. andica?) pollinating flowers (image author Christopher Michel)

Streptosolen jamesonii flowers profusely over a period of several weeks and produces nectar in abundance. Nectar secretion commences around the time the flower opens and continues for about three days. Anther dehiscence coincides with the beginning of [ nectar ] secretion. As the flower matures, its colour changes from yellow through orange to scarlet. The age of the flower can be estimated quite accurately from the colour and diameter of the flower [ corolla ]...Nectar accumulates in the corolla tube. - R. W. Shuel

Shuel described a gradual color change from yellow through orange to scarlet as flowers mature, allowing the pollinator to accurately estimate the age and possible nectar content of the flower. - Martin von Arx

== Taxonomy ==
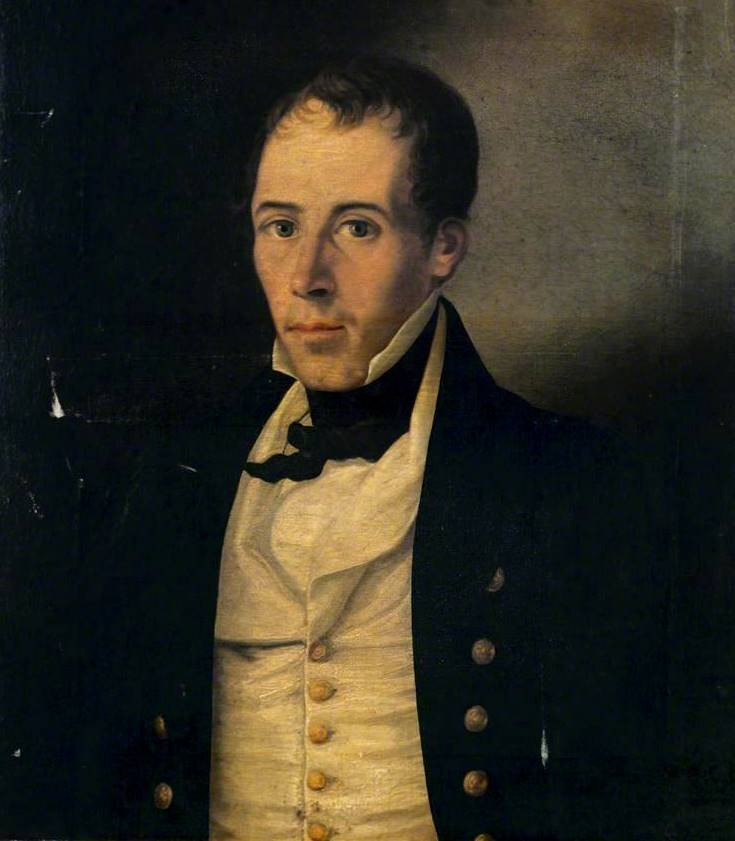
William "Gulielmo" Jameson (1796–1873), pioneering Scottish-Ecuadorian botanist, commemorated in the specific name of Streptosolen jamesonii

Scrambling, arching growth habit. Cultivated plant, Madeira Botanical Garden

The genus name Streptosolen is a compound of the Greek στρεπτός (streptos) 'twisted' and σολεν (solen) 'tube' - from the somewhat twisted structure of the corolla of the flower - hence "twisted-tube(d flower)". The specific name jamesonii commemorates Scottish-Ecuadorian botanist William Jameson, Professor of Chemistry and Botany at the Universidad Central del Ecuador, Quito, compiler of a pioneering (but, sadly, unfinished - due to his demise) Flora of Ecuador. The binomial Streptosolen jamesonii was published by English botanist John Miers in the Journal of Natural History (entitled the Annals and Magazine of Natural History from 1841 until 1967) in the year 1850.

== Horticultural merit ==
In the UK this plant has gained the Royal Horticultural Society's Award of Garden Merit. With a minimum temperature of 7 °C (45 °F), this plant must be overwintered indoors in frost-prone areas.

For the opportunity of figuring this very interesting plant we are indebted to Messrs. Veitch and Son, by whom it was lately introduced, and in whose nursery it was blooming profusely in June, 1848. It is a native of the north of Peru, and was found by their collector, Mr. William Lobb, growing at an elevation of 6,000 feet, in woods near Molitre, in the province of Cuenca, which lies inland from the gulf of Guayaquil; he describes it as a shrubby plant two or three feet in height.

- thus, Sir Joseph Paxton in volume 16 of Paxton's Magazine of Botany... in which he demonstrates a measure of confusion regarding the locality in which Lobb collected S. jamesonii - not least as to the country involved, which was Ecuador, not Peru - a fact which may be established from a) the proximity to the Gulf of Guayaquil b) the reference to Cuenca (there is both a city and a canton of Cuenca in Ecuador, but not in Peru) and c) that there is no place name Molitre in South America, but there is a canton named Salitre in the region of southern Ecuador suggested by the other evidence presented by Paxton.

== Folk medicinal ==
Ecuador

The plant is but one of as many as 71 different medicinal plant species, from 33 different plant families, used in the preparation of Ecuadorian Horchata, a tonic drunk to improve physical and spiritual well-being in Ecuadorian folk medicine. The word horchata derives from the Latin hordeum (= barley) and refers to a very varied array of soft drinks consumed in Spain and Latin America, perhaps the best-known being horchata de chufas (tiger nut 'milk'). The very different, medicinal, Ecuadorian form of horchata is most popular in the south of the country and more especially in the province of Loja. Rios et al. (2017) list Streptosolen jamesonii as being included among the herbs used to prepare the tonic drink because of its alleged anti-inflammatory properties.

Peru

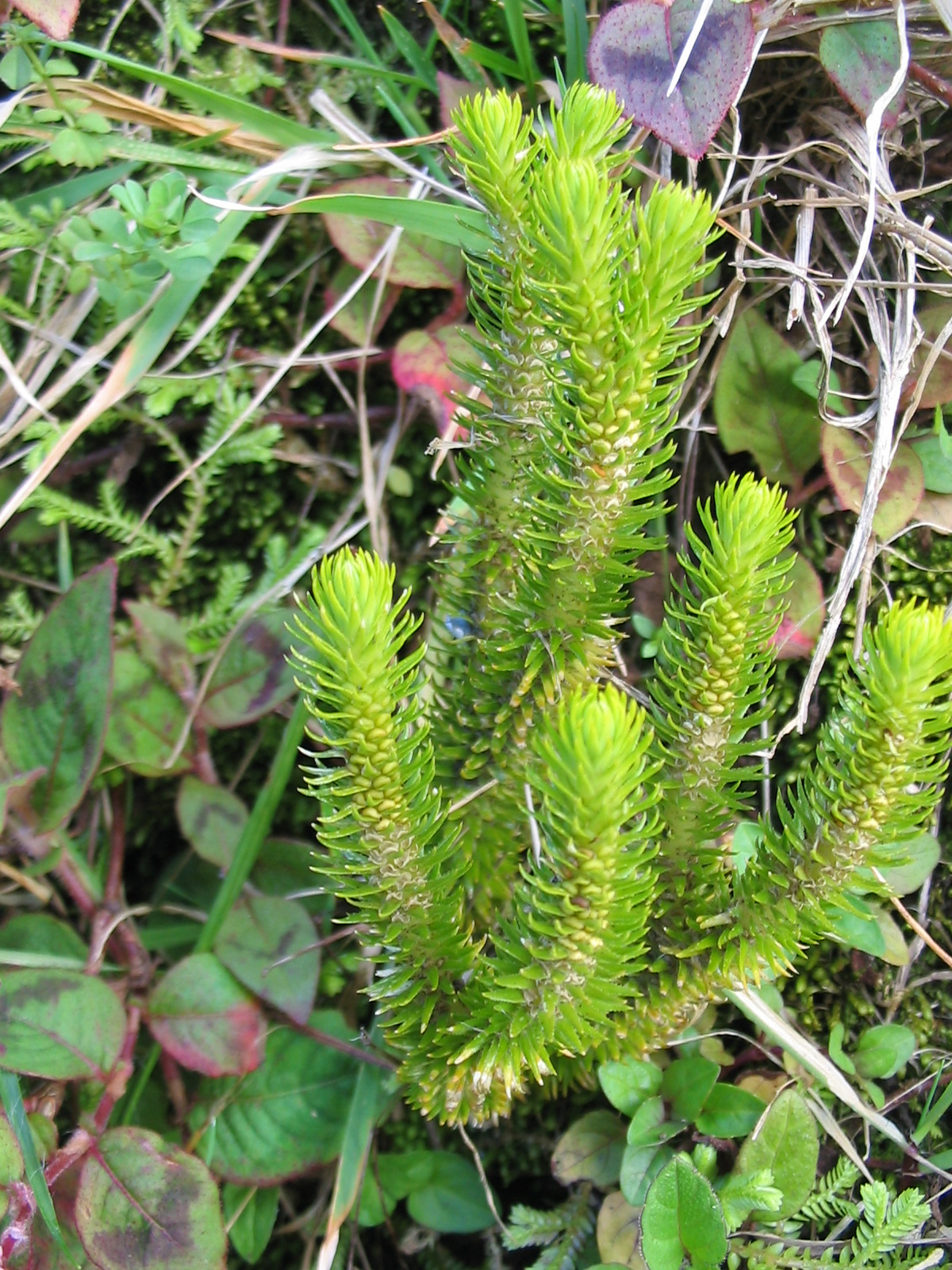
A club moss belonging to the genus Huperzia- which furnishes the purge "Huaminga", used as a follow-up to worming treatment with a Streptosolen infusion, in the folk medicine of Peru.

In the district of Ayabaca in the Piura Region in the northern Peruvian Andes, S. jamesonii - known locally by the name San Juan (="Saint John") - is used as a pediatric anthelmintic. A whole-plant decoction is prepared by boiling approximately 20g of plant material in a litre of water for thirty minutes. This must be drunk on an empty stomach to kill or stun the worms, followed by the taking of a purge - usually Huaminga - to cause the expulsion of the parasites from the bowels. Huaminga is a local vernacular name for a species of club-moss belonging to the genus Huperzia. If about 50 g of the whole plant of this species is ground and boiled in a litre of water, until the volume is reduced to 250ml, a cupful of resulting decoction, consumed after cooling, acts a drastic purgative. Huaminga is said also to be an anthelmintic in its own right, when prepared as a less concentrated decoction and consumed over a period of several days.

[Note : by an oversight, De Feo (2003) lists an 'S. jamesonii' under the heading Solanum. While there IS a binomial Solanum jamesonii, it is likely that the genus De Feo intends is Streptosolen rather than Solanum, as the authors of the name S. jamesonii are given by De Feo as "(Benth.) Miers" (à la Streptosolen) and not "Bitter" (the binomial Solanum jamesonii Bitter is a synonym of Solanum oblongifolium Dunal.)]

== Chemistry ==
Streptosolen jamesonii has been found to contain alkaloids which are also present in various Nicotiana species and also in Salpiglossis sinuata: nornicotine (principal alkaloid), nicotine and anabasine.

Nornicotine has been found to have effects that are initially depressant and subsequently stimulant. It also increases intestinal motility through overall parasympathetic stimulation of the GI tract, which, in combination with its toxicity to parasitic worms, could account for the use of Streptosolen as an anthelmintic. Furthermore, the observation by Ecuadorian cattle-herders of their cattle's possible self-medication by consumption of Streptosolen foliage would have led to the realization that the plant was non-toxic enough to be used as emergency cattle fodder (see above) and could even have the positive benefit of ridding the animals of parasitic worms (re. observation of increased worm-burden in cattle dung).

Anabasine is the active principle responsible for deaths from poisoning caused by the leaves of Nicotiana glauca, the tree tobacco. The alkaloid anabasine, a close structural relative of nicotine, is named for the plant from which it was first isolated: the toxic Central Asian plant Anabasis aphylla. Recently, anabasine-related alkaloids have also been isolated from the venom of an ant belonging to the genus Aphaenogaster and a marine nematode worm. Anabasine sulphate was a widely used botanical insecticide in the former Soviet Union until the 1970s.

Streptosolen jamesonii (common name Guizcho del bosque) 'Can be used as an emergency food for cattle when the pasture is bad'.

[Note : the author does not give a translation of Ecuadorian Spanish word guizcho, which also forms an element in the vernacular name of another wild plant : Guizcho alto i.e. 'Tall guizcho', which is listed by Camp et al. (1987) as the name of the species known formerly as Malvastrum scoparium, but now as Malvastrum tomentosum (family Malvaceae). The name Guizcho del bosque, by contrast, means 'Guizcho of the forest'].

[Note: the use of the plant as cattle fodder, as a pediatric anthelmintic, and as a constituent of a folk-medicinal tonic (as listed above) suggests that the concentrations of toxic alkaloids in the plant are unlikely to be high - otherwise cases of accidental poisoning would be reported more frequently in the literature.]

== Toxicity ==
The California Poison Control System assigns a code number '4' to the plant, a rating of 4 being assigned to plant species that constitute a major health risk, if consumed - especially in large amounts - with a likely risk of causing serious effects to the heart, liver, kidneys or brain. Available accounts of the toxicity of Streptosolen jamesonii tend to be somewhat vague, hingeing upon its membership of a plant family noted for its many toxic species, rather than upon any well-documented cases of poisoning.

== Gallery ==
Single flower, showing nodding, capitate stigma and two pairs of stamens with filaments of different lengths and anthers of different sizes.

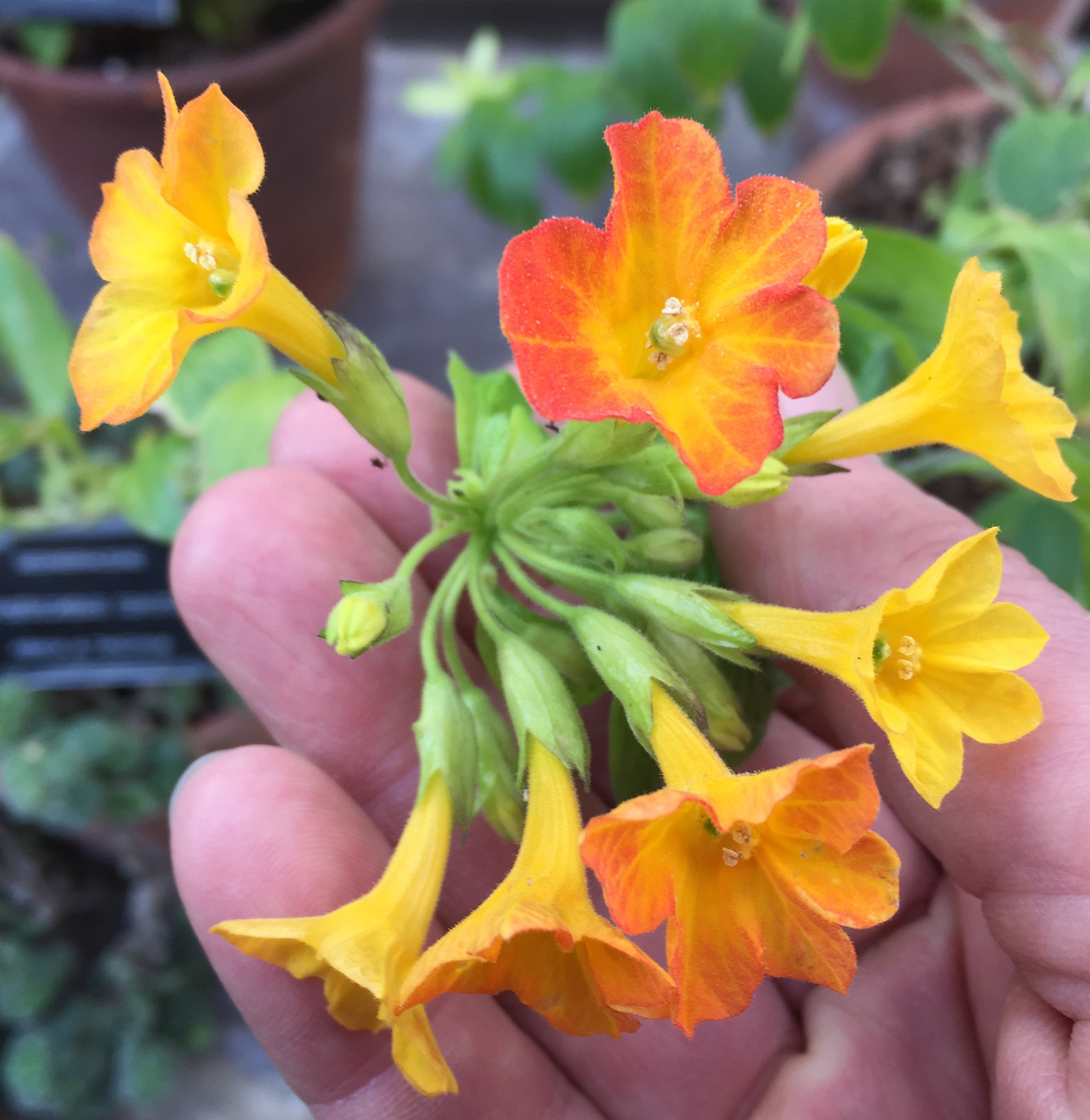
Inflorescence of pot-grown specimen grown in cool glasshouse in Chelsea Physic Garden

Same specimen with flowers seen in profile. Chelsea Physic Garden

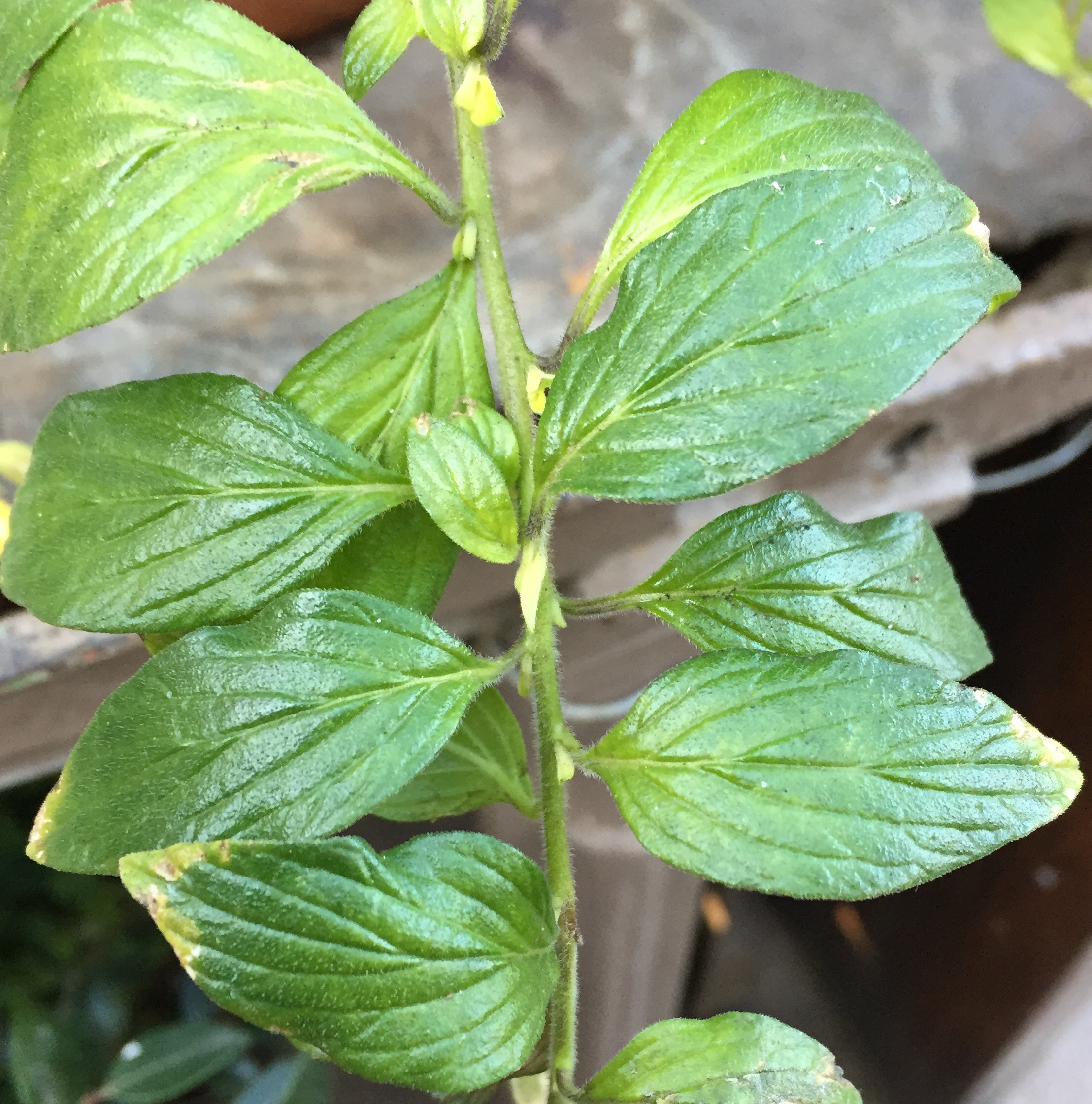
Upper surfaces of leaf blades, showing characteristic pattern of fine wrinkles, reminiscent of those of certain Ceanothus spp.

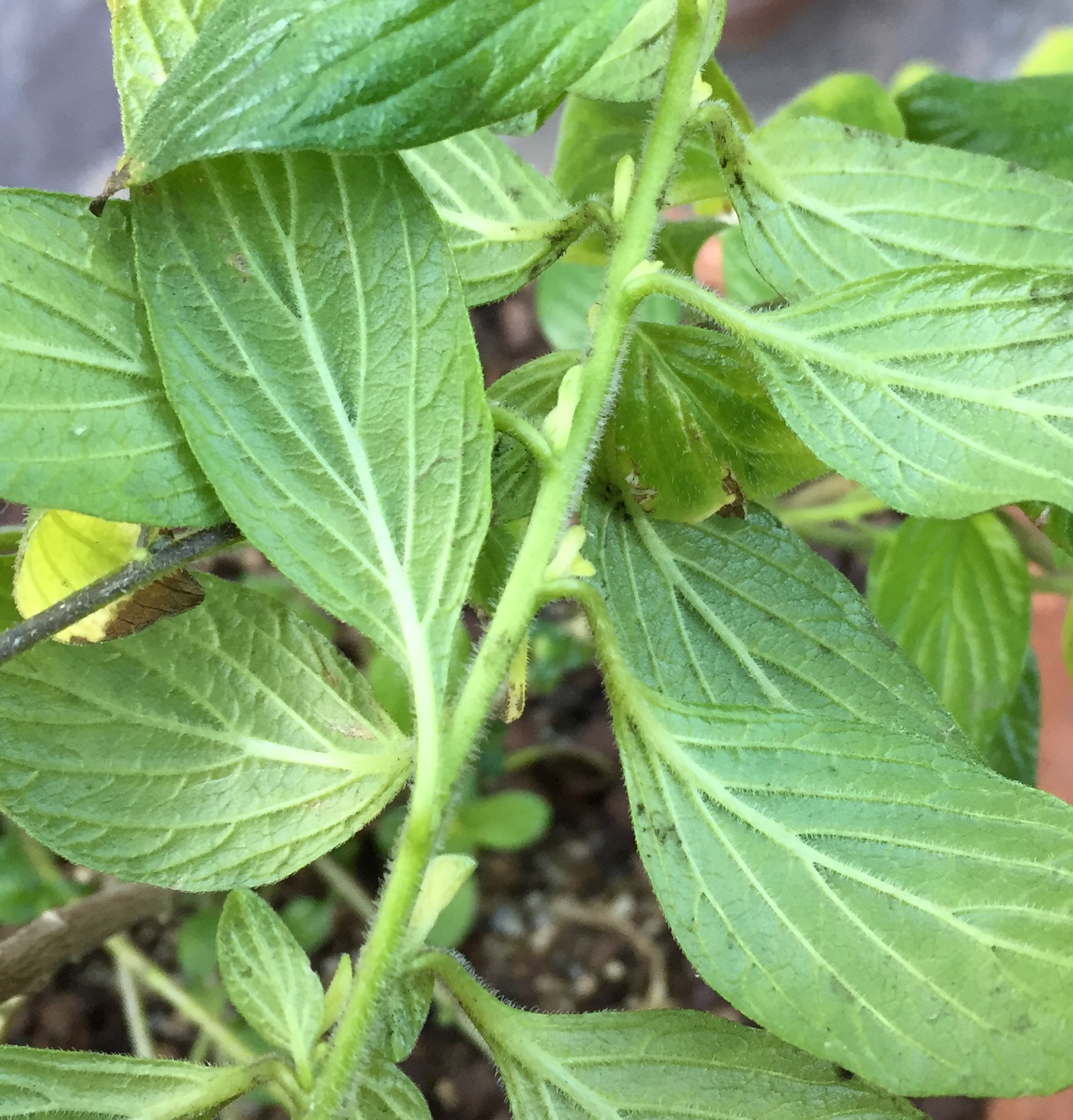
Lower surfaces of leaf blades, showing characteristic prominent pubescent venation
