= Suyo =

Suyo may refer to:

- Suyo District, in the province of Ayabaca, Peru
- Suyo, Ilocos Sur, municipality in the Philippines
