= Antología =

Antología may refer to:

- Antología (band), a Peruvian Andean music group
- Antología, a 2001 boxed set by V8
- Antología (Mijares album), 2002
- Antología, a 2004 album by Marcos Witt
- Antología (Fiskales Ad-Hok album), 2004
- Antologia, a 2004 album by Giovanna Marini
- Antologia, a 4-disc retrospective of Shturcite
- Antología (Marco Antonio Solís album), 2014
- "Antología" (song), a song by Shakira from the album Pies Descalzos
