= Corazón Serrano =

Peruvian cumbia band

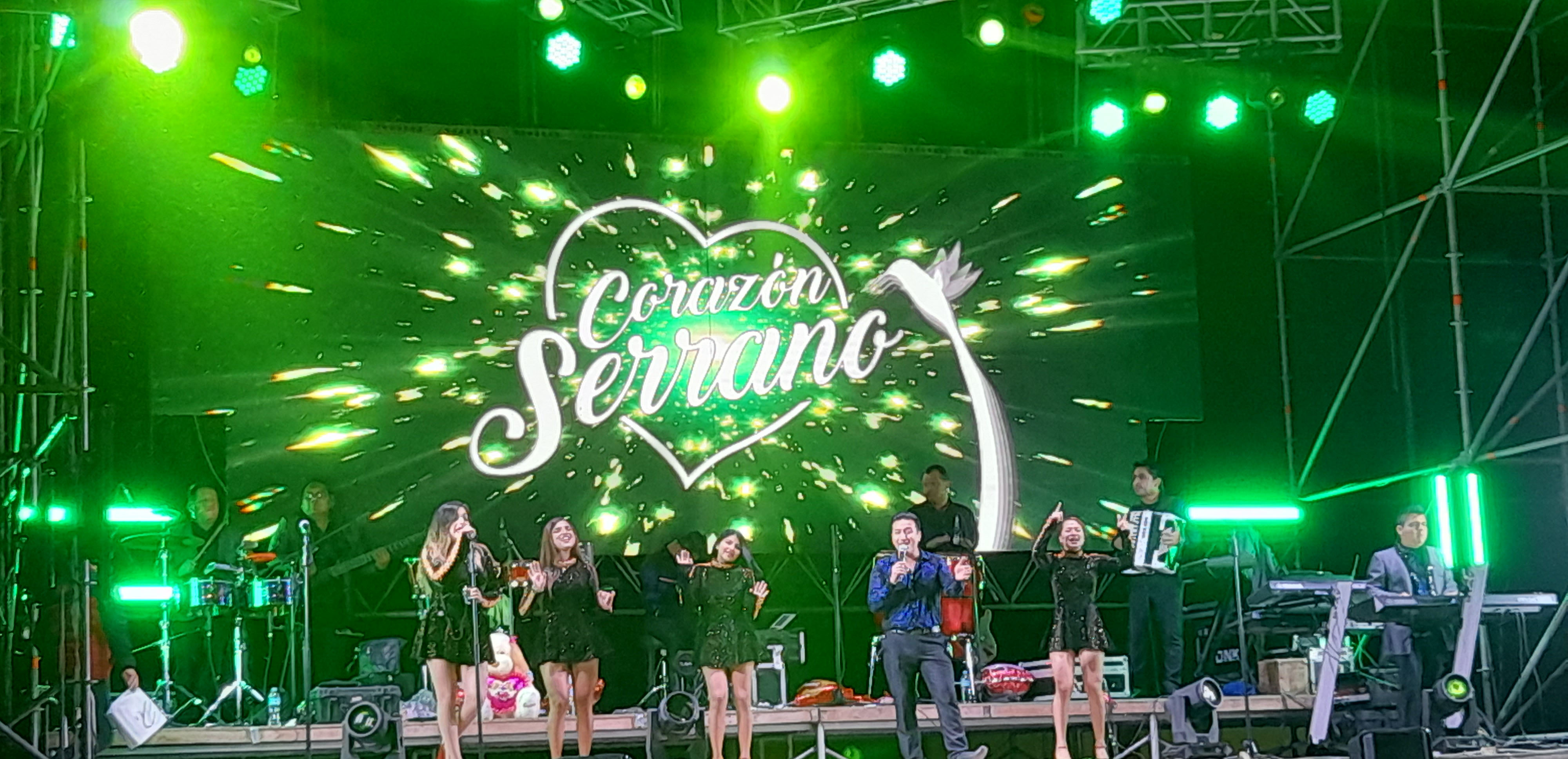
- Corazón Serrano in 2022

Background information
- Origin: Pacaipampa District, Piura, Peru
- Genres: Peruvian cumbia; merengue
- Years active: 1993–present
- Labels: Leader Music, Sony Music
- Members: Edwin Guerrero; Dani Daniel; Yrma Guerrero; Lesly Águila; Susana Alvarado; Ana Lucía Urbina; Milagros Díaz; Kiara Lozano; Briela Cirilo; Cielo Fernández; Sharik Arévalo
- Website: corazonserrano.com.pe

Corazón Serrano is a Peruvian cumbia group founded on February 24, 1993, in the village of Bellavista de Cachiaco, Pacaipampa district, Ayabaca province, Piura. Directed by the Guerrero Neyra brothers, it is recognized by the newspaper El Comercio as one of the country's most streamed musical acts. As of 2025, its lead vocalists are Yrma Guerrero, Lesly Águila, Susana Alvarado, Ana Lucia Urbina, Kiara Lozano, Milagros Díaz, Briela Cirilo, and Cielo Fernández. Edwin Guerrero serves as vocalist, director, and general producer, supported by Dani Daniel as host, and a band featuring Dany Morales, Jhon Chumo, Pedro Arroyo, Jorge León, Alexander Hurtado, Frank Pasapera, and Henry Patiño.

Initially formed by brothers Lorenzo and Edwin Guerrero with vocalists Yrma and Edita, the group developed its career in northern Peru from 1994 onward. However, it was in 2010 that Corazón Serrano began a steady ascent, adopting styles from Ecuador and Colombia. The inclusion of Lesly Águila and the success of "Tu ausencia" – initially intended for male vocalist Renzo Palacios – significantly expanded its popularity across Lima and much of Peru. With the subsequent addition of Thamara Gómez (2011) and Estrella Torres (2013), the orchestra released major hits such as "Díganle" and "Cómo se olvida" (feat. Thamara), "Vete" (feat. Lesly), and "Cuatro mentiras" (feat. Estrella). Despite the passing of key member Edita Guerrero in early 2014 and the departures of Lesly Águila (2014), Estrella Torres (2015), and Thamara Gómez (2016), the group maintained its activity. In 2018, Lesly Águila returned, and the lineup grew to include up to eight female vocalists, strengthening its presence in neighboring Bolivia and Ecuador. Meanwhile, Lorenzo Guerrero founded the sister group El Encanto de Corazón in 2015, which features several former members of Corazón Serrano, including his daughter Melanie Guerrero.

== History ==
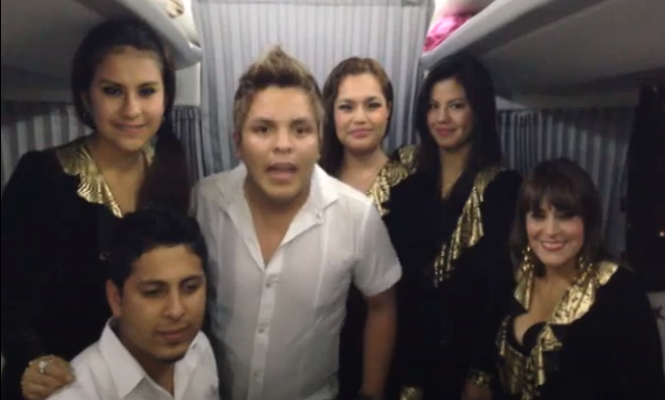
Corazón Serrano in 2013

The orchestra was founded on February 2, 1993, in Pacaipampa, Ayabaca province. Originally named Los Hermanos Guerrero Neyra, it was formed by the siblings Lorenzo, Floro, Noemí, Fredy, Yrma, Edwin, Edita, and Leodan. In its early days, Edwin was the vocalist and Lorenzo the lead guitarist, dedicating their songs primarily to cumbia sanjuanera. They performed at various venues, local parties, and festivals in Piura, blending Northern Peruvian cumbia with Ecuadorian sanjuanitos—a popular style in northern Peruvian cities like Piura. Yrma later joined as the first female voice. Over time, the group evolved into an ensemble with a strong female presence on stage, often performing in glittery outfits, though they also adopted more formal attire on certain occasions.

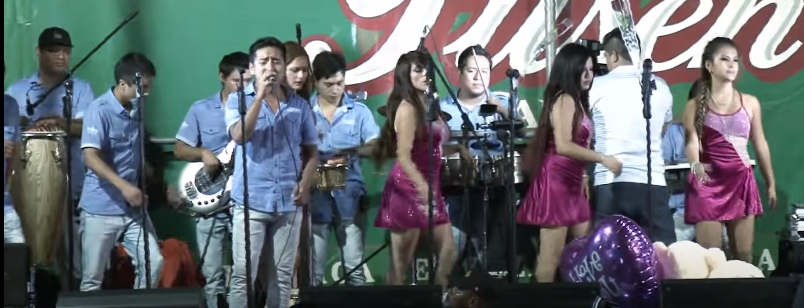
Corazón Serrano in 2014

In 1996, the Guerrero Neyra brothers moved to the city of Piura, hoping their music would gain wider recognition in the regional capital. Settling in the Micaela Bastidas neighborhood—which would later become their recording studio until their eventual relocation to Lima—they released the cover "Alitas quebradas," performed by Yrma and Edita. The song became a major national hit, reaching number one on the tropical charts. Around this time, they also released the album Corazón Serrano, which led to the group adopting that name permanently. According to the Guerrero family, the name change reflected a broader, multicultural Peruvian identity, moving beyond regional labels to embrace the country's diverse musical roots.

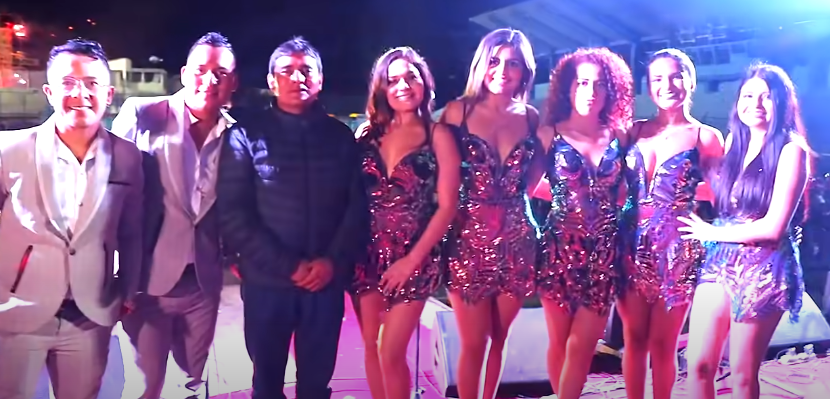
Corazón Serrano in 2019

The group held its first concert in Lima in 1997 at the Salón Imperial on Jr. Cailloma, organized by promoter Zózimo Franco Valverde. The following year, they made their television debut on the program La movida de los sábados on Panamericana Televisión. Despite these early breakthroughs, Corazón Serrano struggled to gain consistent media attention or widespread fame in Lima during the 2000s, especially compared to contemporary stars like Johnny Orosco or Rossy War. Key releases from this period included "Mi chacrita" (2003), "Borracha perdida" (2004—their first music video), and "Bomba chuchaqui" (2004), the latter showing clear Ecuadorian influence. However, their track "Camino a España" was rejected by national radio programmers due to its Andlean folk elements, limiting their growth in the capital. For much of the decade, they performed mainly as an opening act for more established groups like Grupo 5 and Agua Marina.

The turning point came in 2010. During Yrma Guerrero's pregnancy, the group held auditions for a replacement vocalist and selected Lesly Águila, a young singer from Piura. Her rendition of "Tu ausencia"—a song originally intended for male vocalist Renzo Palacios—became a massive hit. That same year, Corazón Serrano secured a crucial partnership with Corporación Universal, owner of Radio Karibeña, which gave them significant airtime across its national network. This alliance, combined with the success of "Tu ausencia" and the "Mix Pintura Roja" medley, marked the beginning of their sustained rise. In 2011, Thamara Gómez (then just 12 years old) joined and delivered further hits like "Díganle" and "Cómo se olvida." The group expanded to a female quartet with the addition of Kiara González, though she was soon replaced by Lleri Quito and, later, by the return of Lesly Águila in late 2012.

2013 was a year of consolidation. Celebrating their 20th anniversary in Piura, Corazón Serrano solidified their status as a leading cumbia act. When Edita Guerrero took maternity leave, auditions were held, and Estrella Torres joined the lineup. The group released a series of successful singles, including "Cuatro mentiras," and became one of the most-searched artists on YouTube in Peru. Their concert at the Feria del Hogar in Lima drew 20,000 people, surpassing the attendance for international acts like Carlos Vives. Tragically, in March 2014, Edita Guerrero died at age 30, sending shockwaves through the group and their fanbase. Despite this loss, the orchestra continued. Following a controversial casting process, Nickol Sinchi joined in late 2014. The following year, the group expanded further with the addition of the twin sisters Ana Claudia and Ana Lucía Urbina, as well as Susana Alvarado, whose songs "Nos critican" and "No eres único" became fan favorites.

The years 2016–2019 saw further lineup changes, with brief tenures by Sonia Loayza and Victoria Puchuri. In 2018, Lesly Águila made a celebrated return. The following year, Isabel Enriquez joined after a national casting call, and the group signed an international distribution deal with Sony Music. The 2020s brought continued growth: the 2021 hit "Mix Zúmbalo" (feat. Kiara Lozano) earned praise, and the group surpassed one billion views on YouTube. In 2022, they held a virtual tribute concert for Edita Guerrero, featuring several former members, and resumed national and international touring. For their 30th anniversary in 2023, the lineup expanded to seven female vocalists with the addition of Cielo Heredia and male vocalist Edu Baluarte. However, both later departed, along with Nickol Sinchi. Briela Cirilo joined in August 2023.

In 2024, after more than three decades, Corazón Serrano signed a direct recording contract with Sony Music, aiming to reach a more international, pop-oriented audience. Their first single under the new deal was "Empecemos de cero," performed by Briela Cirilo. That year, they also began re-recording their entire back catalog with the current lineup, releasing the compilation series Recuerdos del corazón. In 2025, celebrating their 32nd anniversary with a sold-out show at Estadio San Marcos, they introduced their eighth female vocalist, Cielo Fernández, and shared the stage with special guests including Dina Páucar and Armonía 10. That same year, the group participated in the prestigious Sergio George festival, underscoring its enduring prominence in the Latin music scene.

== Discography ==
- 1997: Solo para ti
- 1999: Quiéreme sin condición
- 2000: Arrepentida
- 2001: Mujercita buena
- 2010: Tu ausencia
- 2011: Corazón corazoncito
- 2013: Voy a vivir para ti
- 2014: Gran colección de éxitos
- 2014: Pacaipampa - Piura
- 2015: Late más fuerte
- 2016: No deja de latir
- 2016: Que viva el amor
- 2017: Volverás
- 2018: Primicias 2018
- 2018: En vivo en Piura
- 2018: Un angelito más de
- 2021: Tan solo tú
- 2023: 30 Años (En Vivo)
- 2024: Recuerdos del Corazón Vol. 1, Vol. 2
- 2025: Recuerdos del Corazón Vol. 3
