= Frías District =

Coordinates: 4.9316°S 79.9472°W

Frías
- District
- Interactive map of Frías
- Country: Peru
- Region: Piura
- Province: Ayabaca
- Capital: Frías

Government
  - Mayor: Manuel Magaly Elera Garcia

Area
  - Total: 568.81 km^{2} (219.62 sq mi)
- Elevation: 1,673 m (5,489 ft)

Population (2005 census)
  - Total: 22,812
  - Density: 40.105/km^{2} (103.87/sq mi)
- Time zone: UTC-5 (PET)
- UBIGEO: 200202

Frías District is one of ten districts of the Ayabaca province in Peru.

== Climate ==
Climate data for Alto de Poclus, Frías, elevation 3,080 m (10,100 ft), (1991–2020)
Month	Jan	Feb	Mar	Apr	May	Jun	Jul	Aug	Sep	Oct	Nov	Dec	Year
Mean daily maximum °C (°F)	15.8 (60.4)	15.5 (59.9)	15.7 (60.3)	16.1 (61.0)	16.1 (61.0)	16.1 (61.0)	16.3 (61.3)	16.8 (62.2)	17.1 (62.8)	16.6 (61.9)	16.6 (61.9)	16.2 (61.2)	16.2 (61.2)
Mean daily minimum °C (°F)	7.8 (46.0)	7.8 (46.0)	8.1 (46.6)	8.1 (46.6)	7.7 (45.9)	6.9 (44.4)	6.7 (44.1)	6.5 (43.7)	6.9 (44.4)	6.9 (44.4)	6.5 (43.7)	7.3 (45.1)	7.3 (45.1)
Average precipitation mm (inches)	145.4 (5.72)	201.8 (7.94)	228.5 (9.00)	136.7 (5.38)	64.5 (2.54)	8.3 (0.33)	3.0 (0.12)	5.1 (0.20)	6.5 (0.26)	31.7 (1.25)	44.7 (1.76)	66.3 (2.61)	942.5 (37.11)
Source: National Meteorology and Hydrology Service of Peru
