= Paimas District =

Coordinates: 4.6270°S 79.9453°W

Paimas
- District
- Interactive map of Paimas
- Country: Peru
- Region: Piura
- Province: Ayabaca
- Founded: September 8, 1964
- Capital: Paimas

Government
  - Mayor: Jorge Saavedra

Area
  - Total: 319.67 km^{2} (123.43 sq mi)
- Elevation: 550 m (1,800 ft)

Population (2005 census)
  - Total: 9,761
  - Density: 30.53/km^{2} (79.08/sq mi)
- Time zone: UTC-5 (PET)
- UBIGEO: 200207

Paimas District is one of ten districts of the province Ayabaca in Peru.
