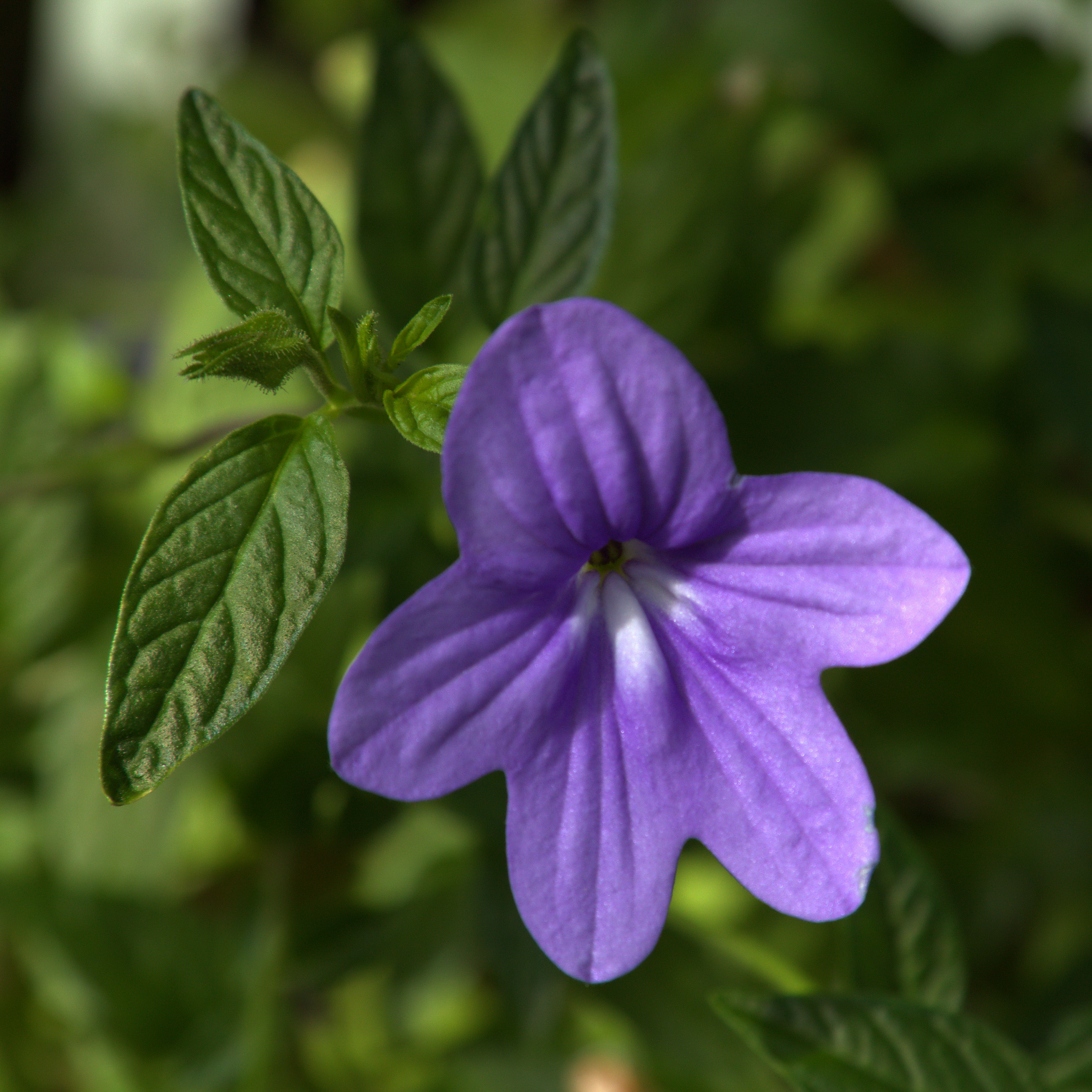

Scientific classification
- Kingdom: Plantae
- Clade: Tracheophytes
- Clade: Angiosperms
- Clade: Eudicots
- Clade: Asterids
- Order: Solanales
- Family: Solanaceae
- Genus: Browallia
- Species: B. speciosa

Binomial name
- Browallia speciosa Hook.

= Browallia speciosa =

Species of flowering plant

Browallia speciosa is a blue-violet tender perennial usually grown as an annual flowering plant also called the amethyst flower or bush violet. It is much used as a garden ornamental.

== Use in Colombian folk medicine ==
The Ingano of Mocoa in the Colombian department of Putumayo chew the leaves of Browallia speciosa and pack the resultant material around carious molars to alleviate the pain.
