= Ayabaca =

- Town
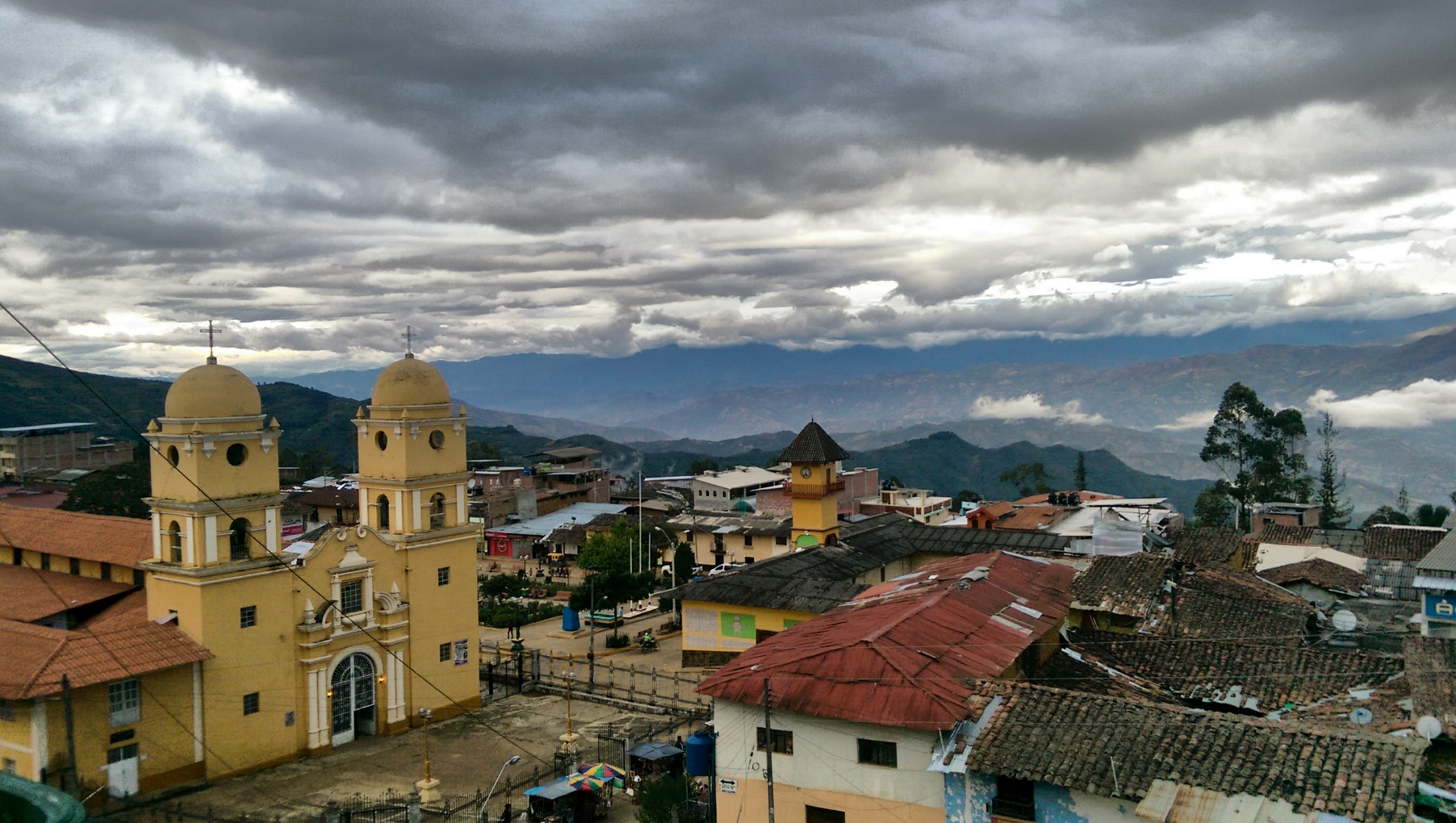
- View on Ayabaca

- Flag

- Location within Peru
- Coordinates: 4°38′13″S 79°43′26″W
- Country: Peru
- Region: Piura Region
- Province: Piura Province
- District: Ayabaca District

Ayabaca is a town in the highlands of the Piura Region in northwestern Peru, near the border with Ecuador. It is located in the Ayabaca Province and is capital of that province and Ayabaca District, to the southeast of the Ecuadorian border town of Macará.

The town is situated in the Andes above the Piura Desert at 2,815 meters above sea level. Its Señor Cautivo festival attracts many followers who come in pilgrimage from several northern zones of Peru and even from Ecuador. It had a population of about 10,000 people in 1975.

== Climate ==
Ayabaca has a subtropical highland climate (Köppen: Cwb) characterized by consistent mild temperatures and a marked contrast between dry and wet seasons.

Ayabaca experiences relatively consistent temperatures throughout the year, with minor variations between months. The yearly average high temperature is 18.2°C (64.8°F), while the yearly average low temperature is 10.1°C (50.2°F).

The total annual precipitation is close to 1,300 millimetres (51 in). Ayabaca receives the majority of its precipitation during the wet season, which typically spans from December to May. March is the rainiest month, with over 300 millimetres (12 in) of precipitation on average. The dry season, from June to September, experiences little precipitation, with July and August being the driest months.

Climate data for Ayabaca, elevation 2,648 m (8,688 ft), (1991−2020)
Month	Jan	Feb	Mar	Apr	May	Jun	Jul	Aug	Sep	Oct	Nov	Dec	Year
Mean daily maximum °C (°F)	17.2 (63.0)	16.9 (62.4)	17.3 (63.1)	17.5 (63.5)	17.9 (64.2)	18.2 (64.8)	18.6 (65.5)	19.3 (66.7)	19.5 (67.1)	19.1 (66.4)	18.6 (65.5)	17.9 (64.2)	18.2 (64.7)
Daily mean °C (°F)	13.6 (56.5)	13.7 (56.7)	13.9 (57.0)	14.0 (57.2)	14.2 (57.6)	14.1 (57.4)	14.1 (57.4)	14.4 (57.9)	14.8 (58.6)	14.5 (58.1)	14.2 (57.6)	13.9 (57.0)	14.1 (57.4)
Mean daily minimum °C (°F)	10.1 (50.2)	10.4 (50.7)	10.5 (50.9)	10.6 (51.1)	10.5 (50.9)	10.0 (50.0)	9.6 (49.3)	9.6 (49.3)	10.0 (50.0)	9.9 (49.8)	9.8 (49.6)	10.0 (50.0)	10.1 (50.2)
Average precipitation mm (inches)	147.7 (5.81)	266.0 (10.47)	322.9 (12.71)	207.9 (8.19)	101.8 (4.01)	20.6 (0.81)	7.0 (0.28)	5.1 (0.20)	21.5 (0.85)	43.1 (1.70)	57.3 (2.26)	96.2 (3.79)	1,297.1 (51.08)
Source: National Meteorology and Hydrology Service of Peru
