= Sapillica District =

Coordinates: 4.7793°S 79.9823°W

Sapillica
- District
- Interactive map of Sapillica
- Country: Peru
- Region: Piura
- Province: Ayabaca
- Founded: February 23, 1946
- Capital: Sapillica

Government
  - Mayor: Silbestre Antonio Carhuapoma Umbo

Area
  - Total: 267.09 km^{2} (103.12 sq mi)
- Elevation: 1,466 m (4,810 ft)

Population (2005 census)
  - Total: 11,032
  - Density: 41.304/km^{2} (106.98/sq mi)
- Time zone: UTC-5 (PET)
- UBIGEO: 200208

Sapillica District is one of ten districts of the province Ayabaca in Peru.
