= Browallia eludens =

Scientific classification
- Kingdom: Plantae
- Clade: Tracheophytes
- Clade: Angiosperms
- Clade: Eudicots
- Clade: Asterids
- Order: Solanales
- Family: Solanaceae
- Genus: Browallia
- Species: B. eludens

Binomial name
- Browallia eludens Van Devender & Jenkins

Species of flowering plant

Browallia eludens is a small herb in the genus Browallia in the family Solanaceae. It is known only from a few locales in Arizona, Sonora, and Chihuahua. Indeed, at the time of its initial publication in 1993, this represented the first time that any member of the genus had been reported from the United States. The epithet "eludens" refers to the fact that the plant had eluded botanists for many years.

The species is considered critically imperiled in the United States because it is known from a single location, in Santa Cruz County, Arizona, a few km north of the Mexican border.

The plants general appearance is unusual for the family. It is a small, delicate, erect herb with yellow flowers. It occurs in moist habitats in forested areas.
