= Montero District =

Coordinates: 4.6322°S 79.8289°W

Montero
- District
- Interactive map of Montero
- Country: Peru
- Region: Piura
- Province: Ayabaca
- Founded: March 24, 1935
- Capital: Montero

Government
  - Mayor: Ramon Eduardo Febre Palacios

Area
  - Total: 130.57 km^{2} (50.41 sq mi)
- Elevation: 1,062 m (3,484 ft)

Population (2005 census)
  - Total: 7,665
  - Density: 58.70/km^{2} (152.0/sq mi)
- Time zone: UTC-5 (PET)
- UBIGEO: 200205

Montero District is one of ten districts of the province Ayabaca in Peru.
