= Sicchez District =

Sicchez
- District
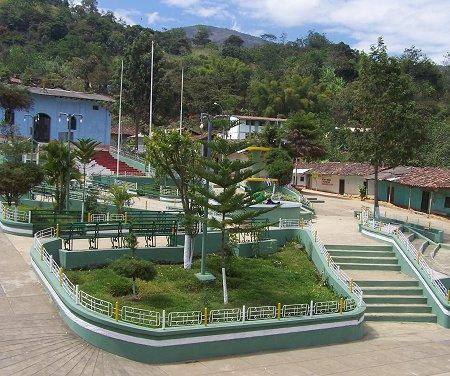
- Interactive map of Sicchez
- Coordinates: 4°34′16″S 79°45′42″W
- Country: Peru
- Region: Piura
- Province: Ayabaca
- Founded: April 8, 1936
- Capital: Sicchez

Government
  - Mayor: Segundo Octavio Chuquihuanga Cunya

Area
  - Total: 33.1 km^{2} (12.8 sq mi)
- Elevation: 1,413 m (4,636 ft)

Population (2005 census)
  - Total: 2,456
  - Density: 74.2/km^{2} (192/sq mi)
- Time zone: UTC-5 (PET)
- UBIGEO: 200209

Sicchez District is one of ten districts of the province Ayabaca in Peru.
