= Antología (band) =

Peruvian Andean music group

Background information
- Origin: Peru
- Genres: Peruvian Folk, Andean Music
- Instruments: Vocals, guitar, charango, quena, zampoña, keyboard
- Years active: 1999–present
- Members: Dilio Galindo, Nicolás Bendezú, Jerry Luyo, Jhojan León, Joan Cachay, Mariluz Alcalá, Judith Acevedo, Jhonatan Castillo, Víctor Valencia, Daniel Veliz, Gianfranco Ramos

Antología is a contemporary urban-Andean music group from Peru, founded in 1999 by Dilio Galindo Moreno and José Meza Muñoz.

The name Antología refers to a multiple collection of musical works from the popular Andean songbook. The Ayacucho huayno is the fundamental musical base of this group, for which modern musical instruments such as the electric bass, keyboard, and drums have been incorporated, in contrast with traditional Andean instruments such as the zampoña, quena, quenacho, charango, and Western-origin instruments such as the guitar and violin.

Antología's music is part of the contemporary Andean music movement in Peru, expressed in the manifestation of Andean musical forms adapted to the demands of modernity, the incorporation of rhythms and instruments from various influences, mainly Latin American.

== History ==
The group Antología was founded in 1999 in Lima by Dilio Galindo Moreno.

In 1999, while still in formation, Antología traveled to Japan, invited to perform at the Tessenkai Theater, Kitahiroshima, and the Keio Plaza Hotel, where they showcased the art of this new urban-Andean current.

Upon returning to Peru in 2000, Antología recorded and presented their first musical work titled "Niña," a romantic Andean style. Thanks to this first production "Niña," the group toured the entire Peruvian territory and some foreign countries such as Bolivia, Ecuador, and Argentina, with a new style in Peruvian folklore.

Antología went through various formations but always maintained its founder, Dilio Galindo Moreno, in all of them.

In 2023, the group had a stellar appearance at the Corazón Serrano concert with the song "Álejate."

== Antología sinfónico ==
In 2008, at the Amphitheater of the Parque de la Exposición, Antología joined their music with the National Symphony Orchestra of Peru to interpret their most well-known songs with the harmony of a symphonic chamber. This concert was called Antología sinfónico, which achieved unprecedented success.

== Discography ==
The group has the following discography.

=== Niña (1999) ===
1. Niña (Miguel Mansilla V.)
2. Nostalgia (Paul Trejos)
3. Promesas de amor (Paul Trejos)
4. Palomita cuculí (Richard Colonia)
5. En otra piel (Paul Trejos)
6. Mi chiquitín (Picaflor de los Andes)
7. Cómo olvidarme de ti (Miguel Mengoa)
8. Corazón contento (D.R.)
9. Luz (Manuelcha Prado)
10. Noche (D.R.)

=== Momentos vividos (2004) ===
1. No vuelvo a amar (Ramiro de la Zerda)
2. En vano fue (Even Navarro)
3. Es así (Hugo Gutierres y Rodolfo Choque)
4. Chuta chuta (D.R.)
5. Sonccollay (Hamilton Fernández)
6. Ananaw (Freddy Ortiz)
7. Nostalgia (Paul Trejos)
8. Momentos vividos
9. Palomita cuculí (Richard Colonia)

Antología Sinfónico (2009)

Vuelve a mí (2010)

13 años (2012)

== Awards and nominations ==
Year	Award	Category	Result	Ref.
2007	Premios Apdayc	Best Folk Group	Winner	

== See also ==
- Music of Peru
