= Lagunas District, Ayabaca =

Coordinates: 4.7897°S 79.8451°W

Lagunas District
- District
- Interactive map of Lagunas District
- Country: Peru
- Region: Piura
- Province: Ayabaca
- Founded: February 23, 1946
- Capital: Lagunas

Government
  - Mayor: Walter Aguilar Marchena

Area
  - Total: 190.82 km^{2} (73.68 sq mi)
- Elevation: 2,216 m (7,270 ft)

Population (2005 census)
  - Total: 6,249
  - Density: 32.75/km^{2} (84.82/sq mi)
- Time zone: UTC-5 (PET)
- UBIGEO: 200204

Lagunas District is one of ten districts of the Ayabaca province in Peru.
