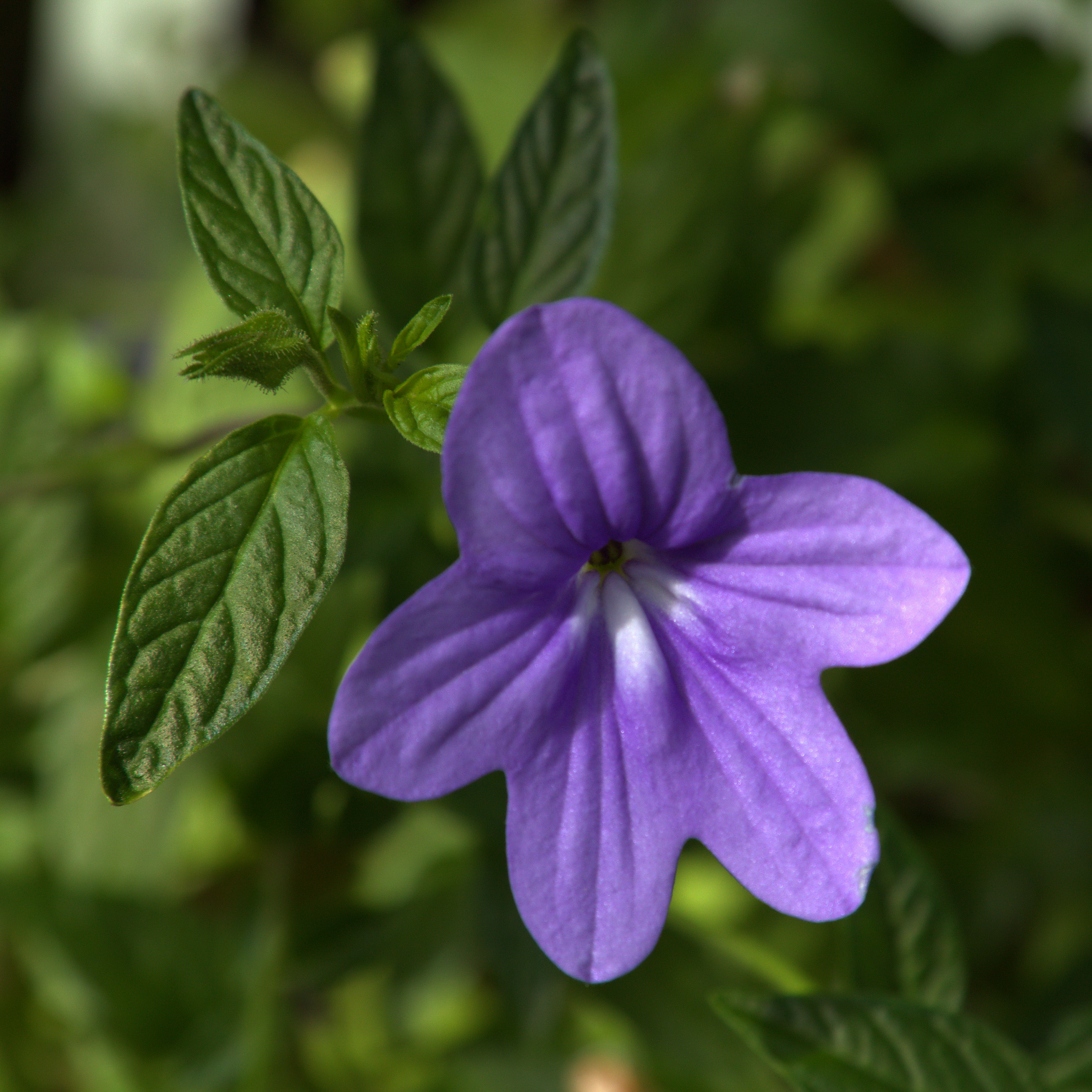
- Browallia speciosa

Scientific classification
- Kingdom: Plantae
- Clade: Embryophytes
- Clade: Tracheophytes
- Clade: Spermatophytes
- Clade: Angiosperms
- Clade: Eudicots
- Clade: Asterids
- Order: Solanales
- Family: Solanaceae
- Subfamily: Cestroideae
- Tribe: Browallieae
- Genus: Browallia; L.

Species
- See text

= Browallia =

Genus of flowering plants

Browallia is a small genus of seven species of flowering plants (mostly annuals though occasionally shrubs or ephemerophytes) belonging to the nightshade family Solanaceae. It is named after Johannes Browallius (1707–1755), also known as Johan Browall, a Swedish botanist, physician and bishop. The genus is closely related to the monotypic genus Streptosolen, the single species of which was published initially under the name Browallia jamesonii.

Browallia species are found from southern Arizona in the north, southward through Mexico, Central America and the Antilles to andine South America, reaching as far south as Bolivia.

== Species ==
'At least 17 binomials, at the specific level, have been proposed for this difficult genus; no doubt that a critical sound treatment is badly needed to clarify its obscure taxonomy' - Armando Hunziker (2001)

- Browallia abbreviata Benth.
- Browallia acutiloba A.S. Alva & O.D. Carranza
- Browallia americana L. - Jamaican forget-me-not
- Browallia dilloniana Limo, K. Lezama & S. Leiva
- Browallia eludens R.K.VanDevender & P.D.Jenkins - Arizona/yellow bush-violet
- Browallia mirabilis S. Leiva
- Browallia speciosa Hook. - Amethyst flower or bush-violet

== Use in Colombian folk medicine ==
The Ingano of Mocoa in the Colombian department of Putumayo chew the leaves of Browallia speciosa to a pulp and pack the resultant material around decaying molars to alleviate the pain of toothache.

== Gallery ==
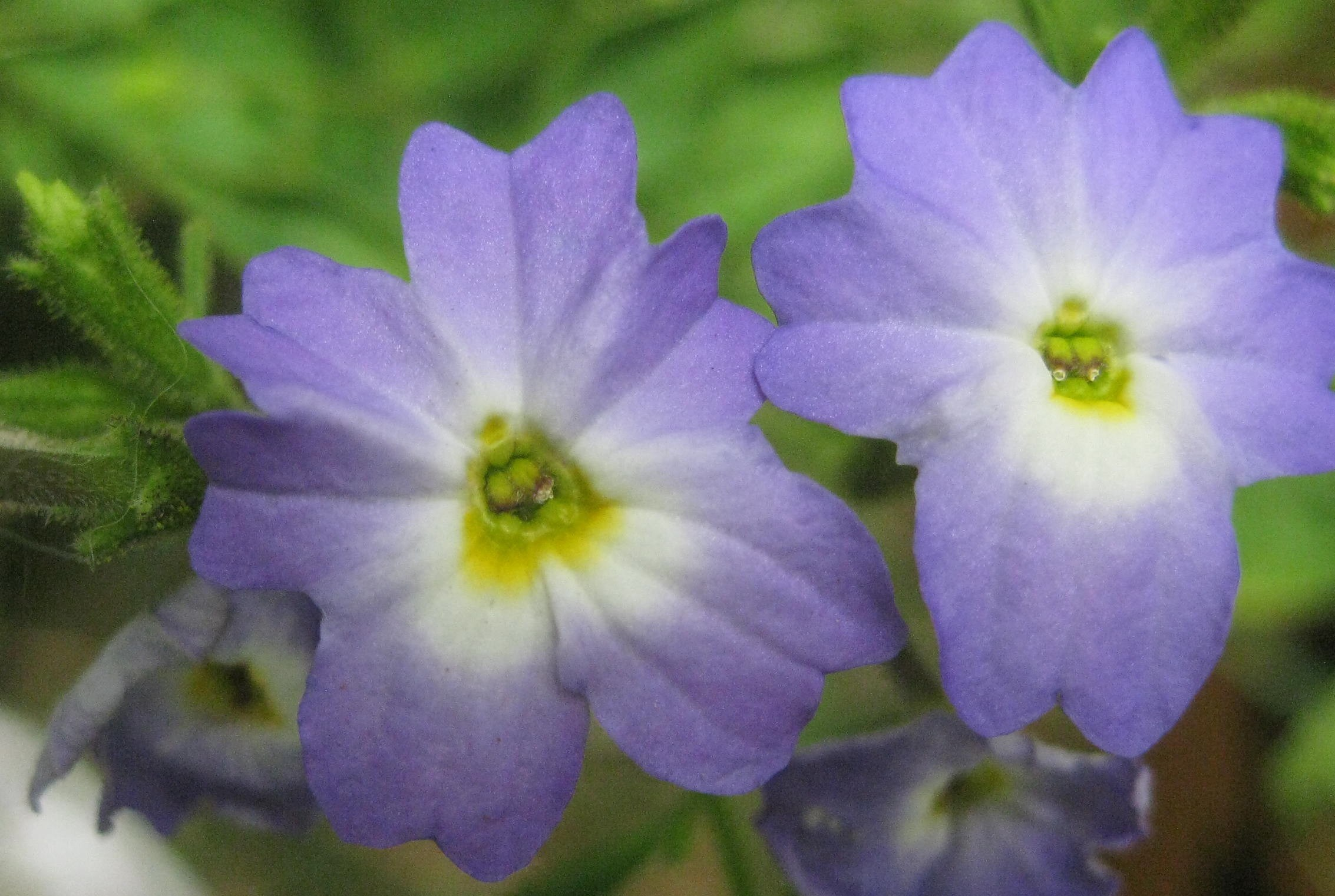
Close-up of flowers of Browallia americana. Self-seeded, garden plant.

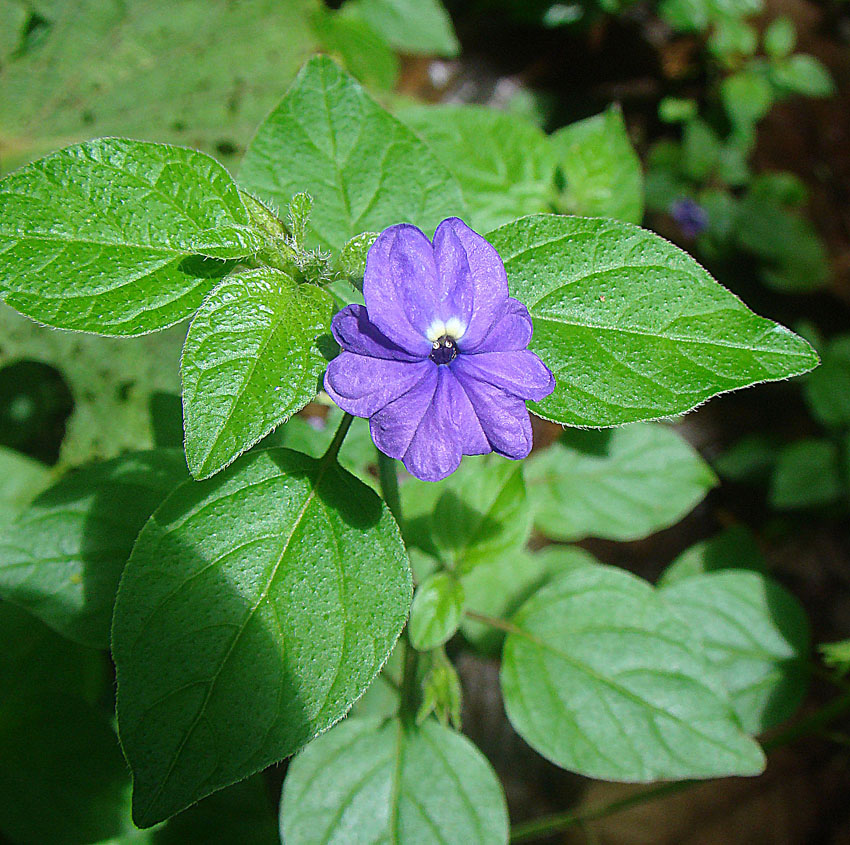
Flower and foliage of Browallia americana, wild plant, Costa Rica.

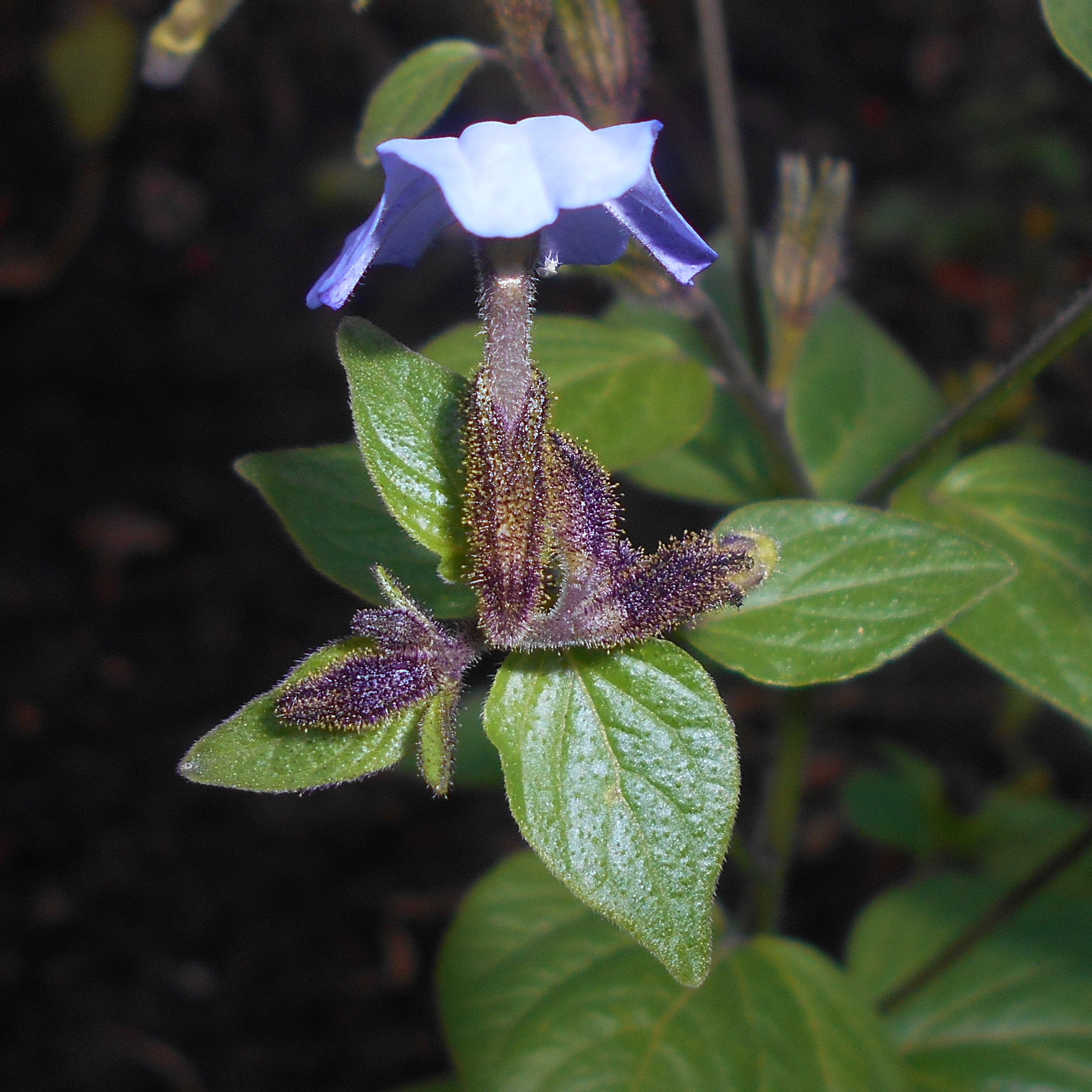
Flower and buds of Browallia americana, in profile, showing pubescent corolla tube and sticky trichomes of calyces.

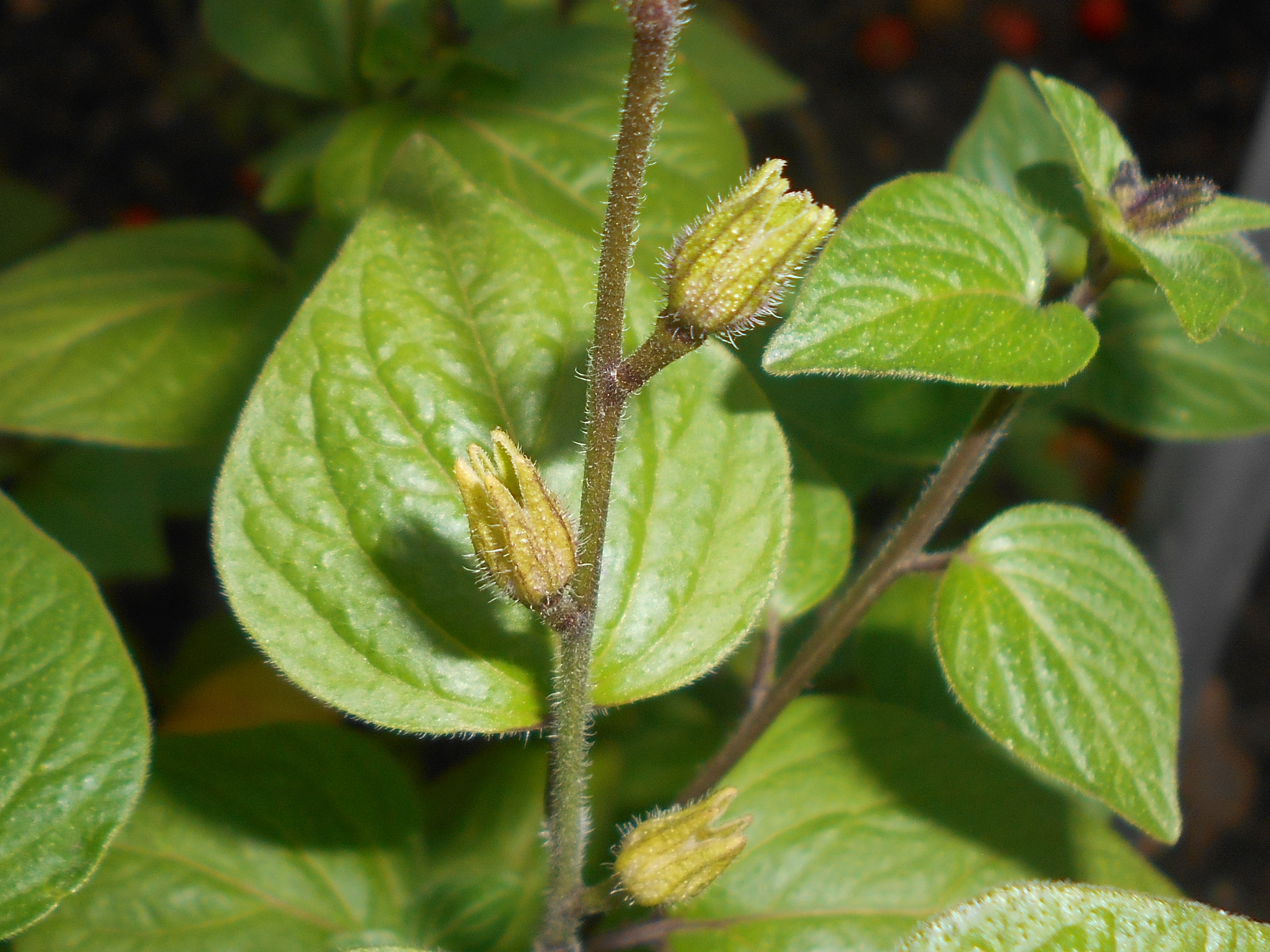
Fruiting calyces of Browallia americana.

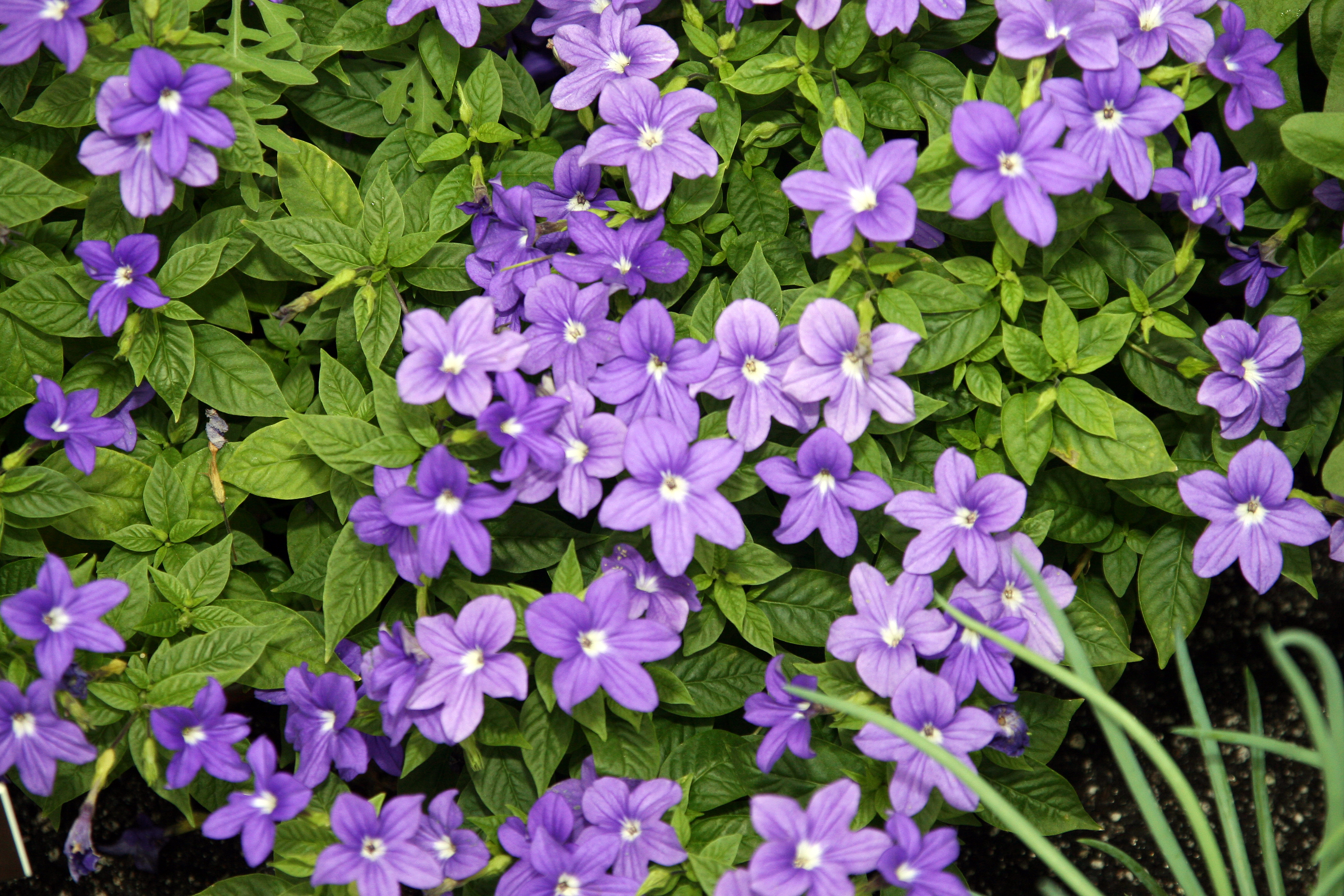
Browallia speciosa cultivar "Marine Bells". Cultivated plant.

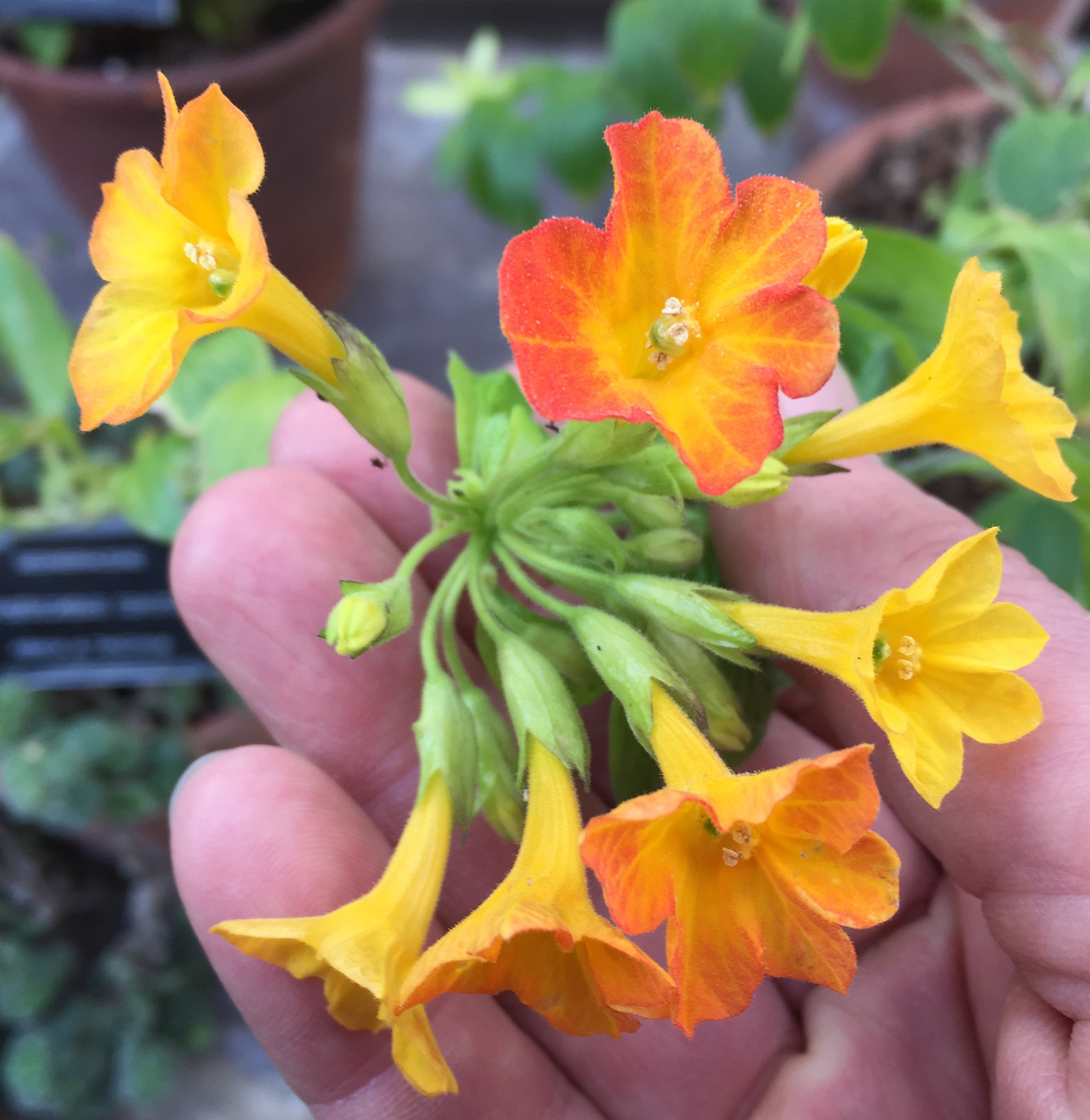
Streptosolen : a monotypic genus closely related to the genus Browallia. S. jamesonii was formerly classified as a Browallia and is still sometimes known colloquially as "Orange Browallia".
