= Jilili District =

Coordinates: 4.5849°S 79.7971°W

Jilili
- District
- Interactive map of Jilili
- Country: Peru
- Region: Piura
- Province: Ayabaca
- Founded: September 8, 1964
- Capital: Jilili

Government
  - Mayor: Victor Alberca Paucar

Area
  - Total: 104.73 km^{2} (40.44 sq mi)
- Elevation: 1,319 m (4,327 ft)

Population (2005 census)
  - Total: 2,975
  - Density: 28.41/km^{2} (73.57/sq mi)
- Time zone: UTC-5 (PET)
- UBIGEO: 200203

Jilili District is one of ten districts of the province Ayabaca in Peru.
