= Suyo District =

Coordinates: 4.5125°S 80.0027°W

Suyo
- District
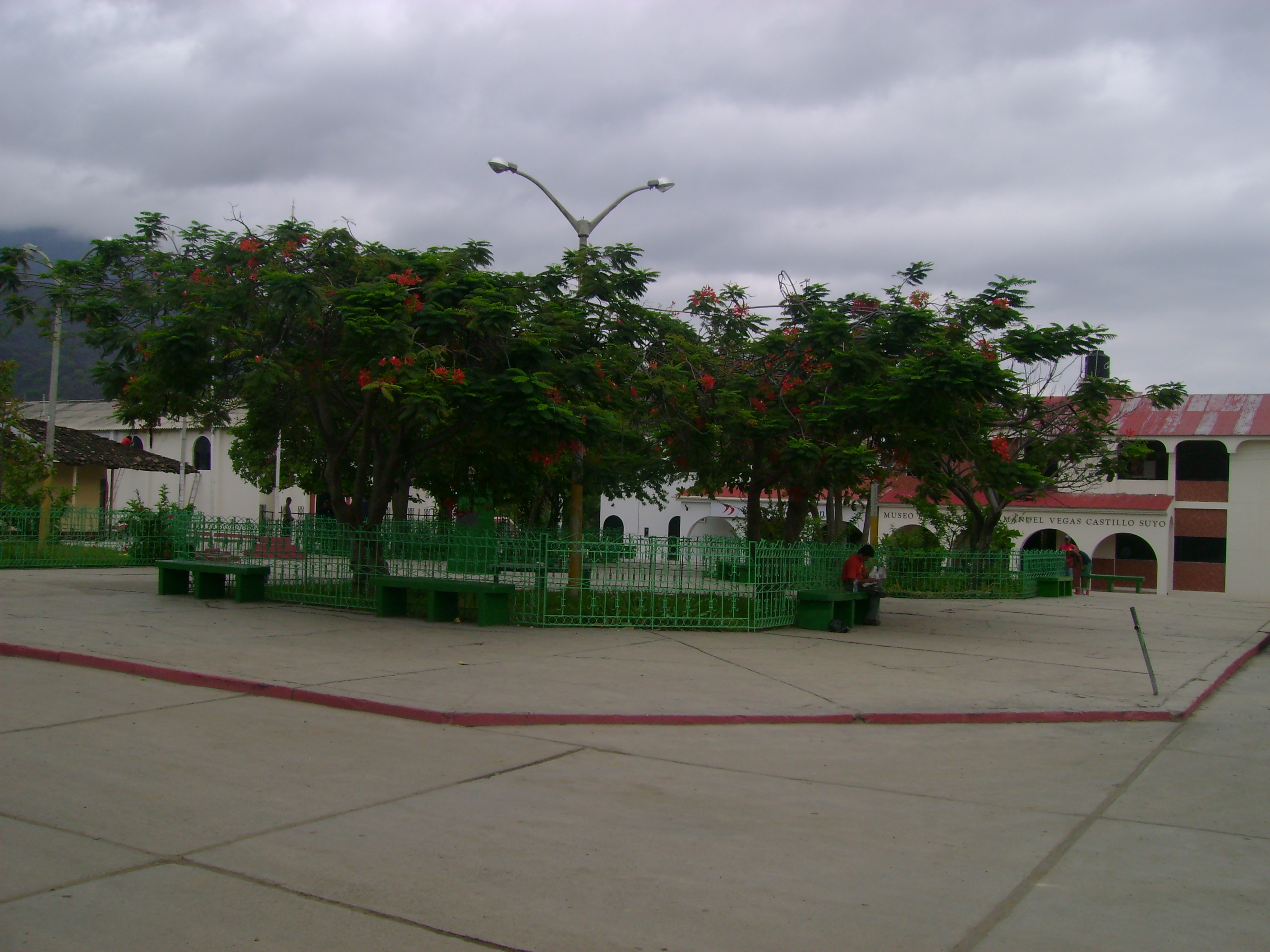

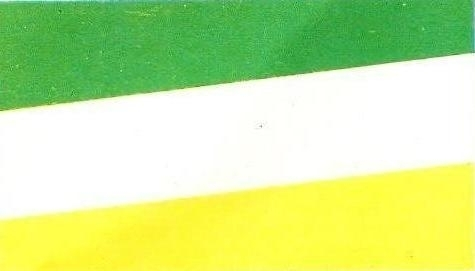
- Flag
- Interactive map of Suyo
- Country: Peru
- Region: Piura
- Province: Ayabaca
- Founded: January 2, 1857
- Capital: Suyo

Government
  - Mayor: Segundo Telmo Guerrero Zegarra

Area
  - Total: 1,084.4 km^{2} (418.7 sq mi)
- Elevation: 399 m (1,309 ft)

Population (2005 census)
  - Total: 12,063
  - Density: 11.124/km^{2} (28.811/sq mi)
- Time zone: UTC-5 (PET)
- UBIGEO: 200210

Suyo District is one of ten districts of the province Ayabaca in Peru.
