= Ayabaca District =

Coordinates: 4°39′S 79°43′W

Ayabaca
- District
- Flag
- Interactive map of Ayabaca
- Country: Peru
- Region: Piura
- Province: Ayabaca
- Founded: January 2, 1857
- Capital: Ayabaca

Government
  - Mayor: Humberto Marchena Villegas

Area
  - Total: 1,549.99 km^{2} (598.45 sq mi)
- Elevation: 3,023 m (9,918 ft)

Population (2005 census)
  - Total: 37,444
  - Density: 24.158/km^{2} (62.568/sq mi)
- Time zone: UTC-5 (PET)
- UBIGEO: 200201

Ayabaca District is one of ten districts of the province Ayabaca in Peru.

== Climate ==
Climate data for Ayabaca, elevation 2,648 m (8,688 ft), (1991−2020)
Month	Jan	Feb	Mar	Apr	May	Jun	Jul	Aug	Sep	Oct	Nov	Dec	Year
Mean daily maximum °C (°F)	17.2 (63.0)	16.9 (62.4)	17.3 (63.1)	17.5 (63.5)	17.9 (64.2)	18.2 (64.8)	18.6 (65.5)	19.3 (66.7)	19.5 (67.1)	19.1 (66.4)	18.6 (65.5)	17.9 (64.2)	18.2 (64.7)
Mean daily minimum °C (°F)	10.1 (50.2)	10.4 (50.7)	10.5 (50.9)	10.6 (51.1)	10.5 (50.9)	10.0 (50.0)	9.6 (49.3)	9.6 (49.3)	10.0 (50.0)	9.9 (49.8)	9.8 (49.6)	10.0 (50.0)	10.1 (50.2)
Average precipitation mm (inches)	147.7 (5.81)	266.0 (10.47)	322.9 (12.71)	207.9 (8.19)	101.8 (4.01)	20.6 (0.81)	7.0 (0.28)	5.1 (0.20)	21.5 (0.85)	43.1 (1.70)	57.3 (2.26)	96.2 (3.79)	1,297.1 (51.08)
Source: National Meteorology and Hydrology Service of Peru

Climate data for Sausal de Culucan, Ayabaca, elevation 997 m (3,271 ft), (1991–2020)
Month	Jan	Feb	Mar	Apr	May	Jun	Jul	Aug	Sep	Oct	Nov	Dec	Year
Mean daily maximum °C (°F)	28.6 (83.5)	27.9 (82.2)	28.4 (83.1)	28.6 (83.5)	28.7 (83.7)	28.6 (83.5)	28.9 (84.0)	29.6 (85.3)	29.7 (85.5)	29.6 (85.3)	29.5 (85.1)	29.0 (84.2)	28.9 (84.1)
Mean daily minimum °C (°F)	18.1 (64.6)	18.6 (65.5)	18.8 (65.8)	18.7 (65.7)	18.1 (64.6)	16.9 (62.4)	16.2 (61.2)	16.1 (61.0)	16.6 (61.9)	16.9 (62.4)	16.8 (62.2)	17.4 (63.3)	17.4 (63.4)
Average precipitation mm (inches)	39.2 (1.54)	75.9 (2.99)	86.6 (3.41)	48.0 (1.89)	20.9 (0.82)	3.4 (0.13)	2.0 (0.08)	1.2 (0.05)	4.1 (0.16)	12.3 (0.48)	14.9 (0.59)	30.7 (1.21)	339.2 (13.35)
Source: National Meteorology and Hydrology Service of Peru
