= Ayabaca province =

Coordinates: 4.637°S 79.724°W

Ayabaca / Ayavaca
- Province
- Flag Coat of arms

- Location of Ayavaca o Ayabaca in the Piura Region
- Country: Peru
- Region: Piura
- Founded: January 14, 1865
- Capital: Ayabaca / Ayavaca

Government
  - Mayor: Humberto Marchena Villegas

Area
  - Total: 5,230.68 km^{2} (2,019.58 sq mi)
- Elevation: 3,023 m (9,918 ft)

Population
  - Total: 38,245
  - Density: 7.3117/km^{2} (18.937/sq mi)
- UBIGEO: 2002
- Website: www.muniayabaca.gob.pe

Ayabaca or Ayavaca is one of the eight provinces of the Piura Region, in northwestern Peru. It borders Ecuador on the north and northeast, the provinces of Huancabamba and Morropón on the south, and the provinces of Piura and Sullana on the west. It is located in the western Andes and its capital is the town of Ayabaca, which is the highest in the whole region.

Two bus companies cover the route Piura-Sullana-Ayavaca. The trip takes from 5 to 6 hours approximately. The province has a large border with Ecuador, and the eastern branch of the Pan-American Highway crosses the Suyo district, at the north of the province, connecting Piura, Sullana and Las Lomas with the Ecuadorian cities of Macará and Loja.

== Etymology ==
The name Ayabaca, also written as Ayavaca, derives from two Quechua roots: aya, related to death, but also to immortality; and huaca connected to sanctuaries and sacred places. Some local monographs have limited its meaning to that of "grave and ancient tomb of the dead" ("tumba de muertos"). They believe this meaning suggests the name was derived from a site with ancient bones and primitive weapons found near the zone where the Spaniards gathered the native population in 1571, when they founded the first "Pueblo de Indios de Nuestra Señora del Pilar de Ayavaca" or missioni Ayavaca Vieja. Such bones and weapons may be the "remains of hordes fallen in combat against the expansionist advance of the Incas".

Aya does not mean only a deceased or ancestor in the physical sense of the corpse or skeleton, but also in the symbolic and spiritual sense of the soul, consciousness and energy that departs the body, temporarily at night and definitely at the end of the life, but continues circulating in all vital processes, as the cycles of water, light and seasons, that move along with the Earth. With that association, aya is also related to the pale red or yellowish colors of twilight and of dawn, as well as to the paleness of newborns and dying persons. Huaca is the name of sacred places or objects. In this sense, the old sanctuary of Ayavaca or Ayahuaca, situated in the western extreme of the mountain range of the Andes, an area where all regional rivers have their sources, is properly the Sanctuary of Death, but also of Immortality, of life’s changes and creative transformation.

== Tourist attractions ==
One of Ayavaca's most important attractions is near Aypate, a site known as the Inca construction, about 49 kilometers (30 mi) east of the province's capital. The Inca work is located on, or in front of, an ancient pre-Inca sanctuary. In 1996, the regional office of the National Institute of Culture recognized Aypate as the "Archaeological Capital of Piura". The name of Aypate (also Aypache or Allpachí), also identifies an important legendary figure considered a founding father in the history of this region. The legend describes the beginning of a golden age after a human triumph in understanding and conquering nature without harming it.

Different places of the province have other evidence of ancient cultures, including petroglyphs (at El Toldo, Samanga), megalithic altars (Chocán, Montero), and remainders of the Qhapaq Ñan or Inca road.

Ayavaca has a multiplicity of landscapes that encompass zones of dry forest and areas of almost permanent humidity located in the mountain range, a region of páramos, lakes and humid forests that supply the main freshwater sources of all the Piura region. Some of these lakes are the Laguna Prieta, near Huamba and Samanga; the Lagunas Arrebiatadas, an assembly of lakes connected in descending levels; the Laguna del Cristal, El Cántaro, and the lake of Santa Clara or Siete Poderes.

Likewise, in the large mountain area shared by the provinces of Ayavaca and Huancabamba, there is a great assembly of lakes locally known as The Huarinjas or Huaringas. One is the very important Laguna del Rey, (Lake of the King or Lake of the Inca King), the highest one in the sierra of Piura, in the district of Pacaipampa.

== Capital ==
The provincial capital is the city of Ayavaca, located at 2,715 meters (8,907 ft) of altitude, with a cold, healthy climate. Its Spanish foundation dates to 1571, when the missionaries gathered the local indigenous population to create the mission village of "Nuestra Señora del Pilar de Ayavaca".

The city has developed as the center of a great religious devotion, dedicated to Jesus Christ under the name of Señor Cautivo (Captive Lord). It is represented in the figure of an "Ecce Homo", which might have been inspired by the figure of Christ of Medinaceli, Spain, or by local religious traditions, or syncretic combination of both. The festival of the Señor Cautivo, whose central day is October 13, attracts numerous pilgrims from many different zones of north Peru, as well as from Ecuador and Colombia. Some pilgrims walk about 2,500 kilometers (1,600 mi) from Tacna, in the south of Peru, making their pilgrimage the most extended one known on the South American continent. A secondary festival of the Señor Cautivo is conducted on January 1. Peasants from the Piura coast and valleys approach the sanctuary to petition for water or to express gratitude for the rains.

== Political division ==
The province of Ayabaca is divided into ten districts (Spanish: distritos, singular: distrito), each of which is headed by a mayor (alcalde):

- Ayabaca
- Frías
- Jilili
- Lagunas
- Montero
- Pacaipampa
- Paimas
- Sapillica
- Sicchez
- Suyo
