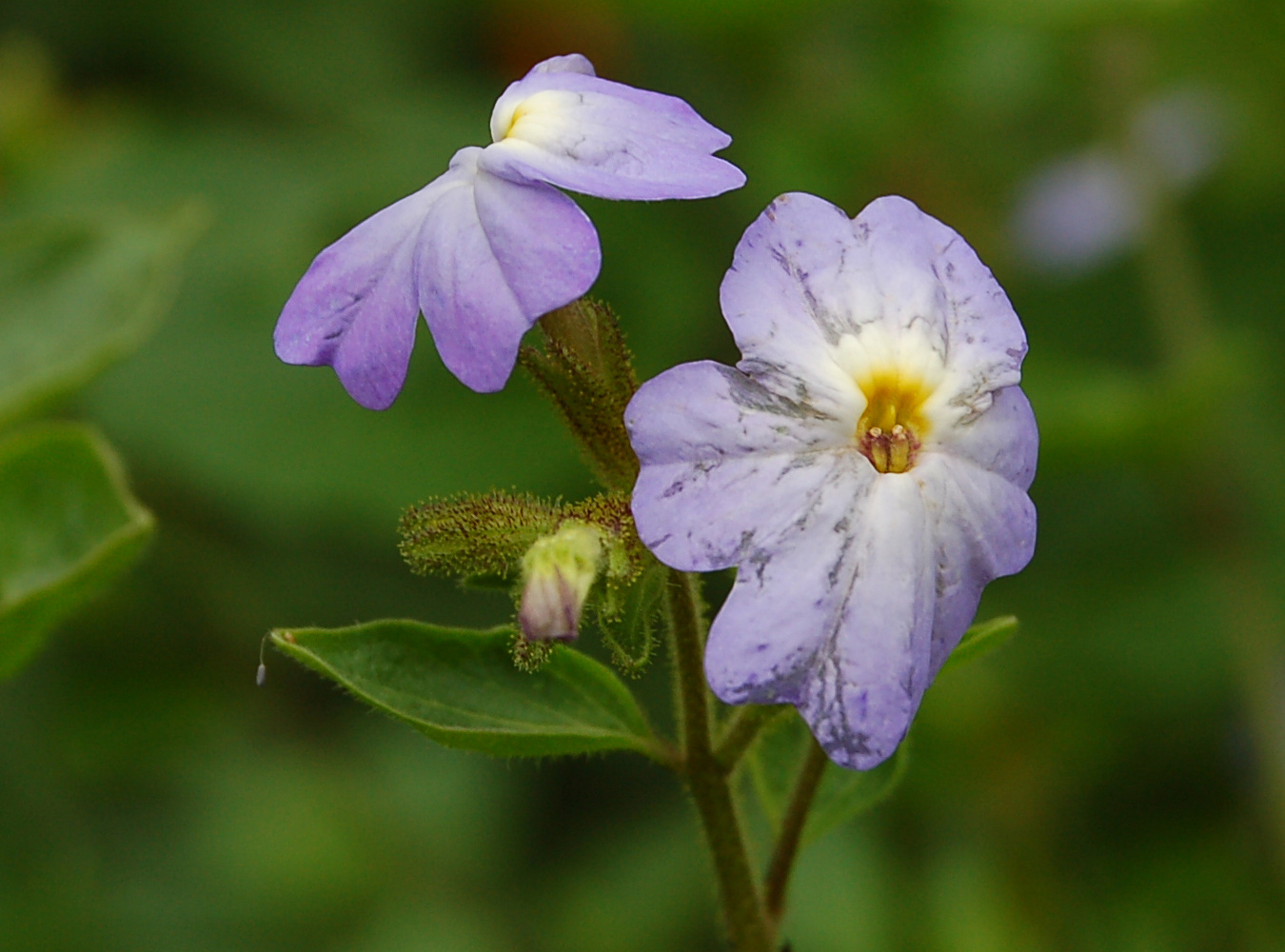
- Closeup of the Browallia americana flower

Scientific classification
- Kingdom: Plantae
- Clade: Tracheophytes
- Clade: Angiosperms
- Clade: Eudicots
- Clade: Asterids
- Order: Solanales
- Family: Solanaceae
- Genus: Browallia
- Species: B. americana

Binomial name
- Browallia americana L.

= Browallia americana =

Species of flowering plant

Browallia americana, the Jamaican forget-me-not, amethyst flower, or bush violet, is a species of flowering plant. It is native to tropical Latin America, from Mexico and the Caribbean, south to Peru and Brazil. Forms are variable. Pictured is the broader-leaved form.

== Gallery ==
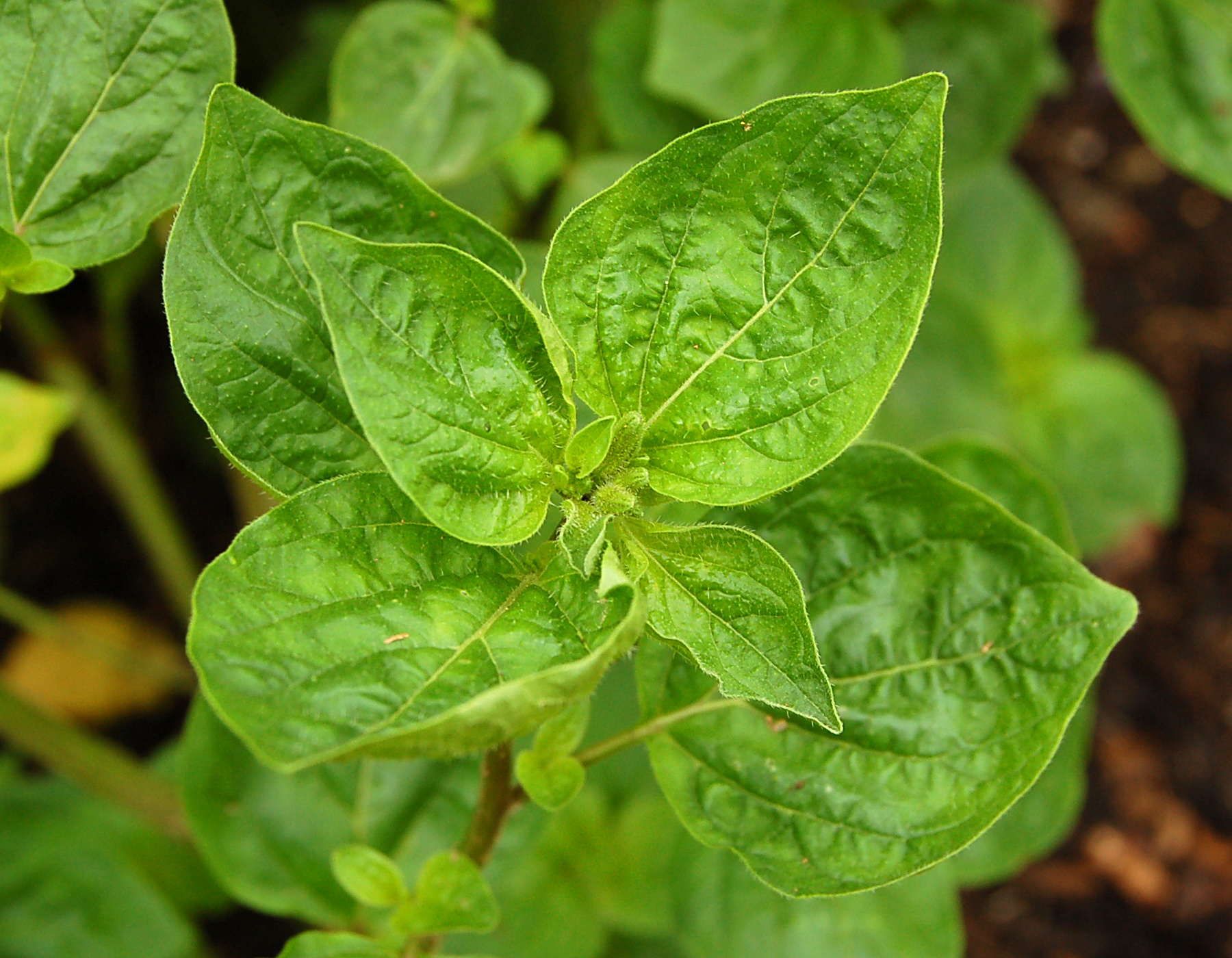
The leaves of Browallia americana

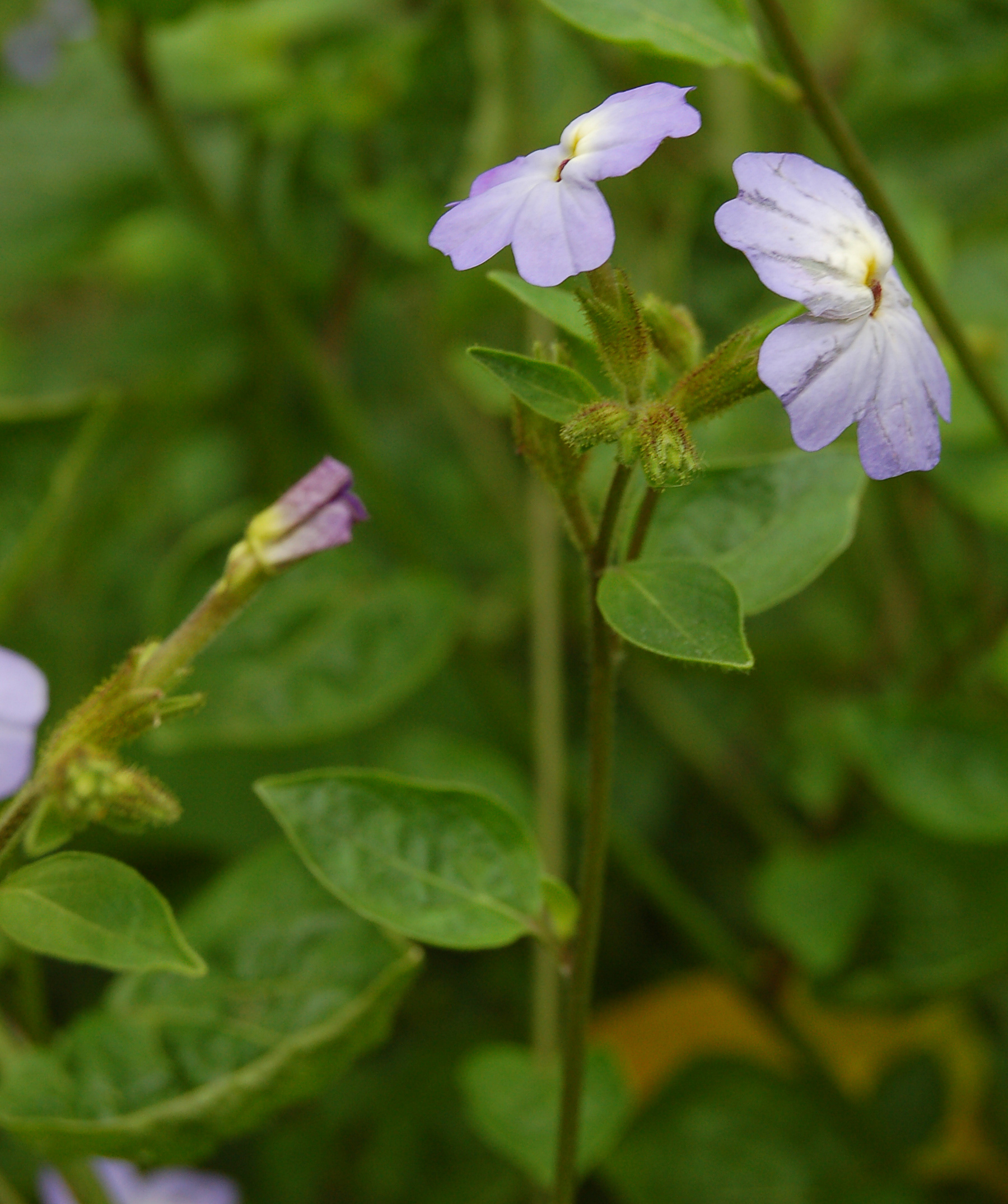
Flowering stalk of Browallia americana.

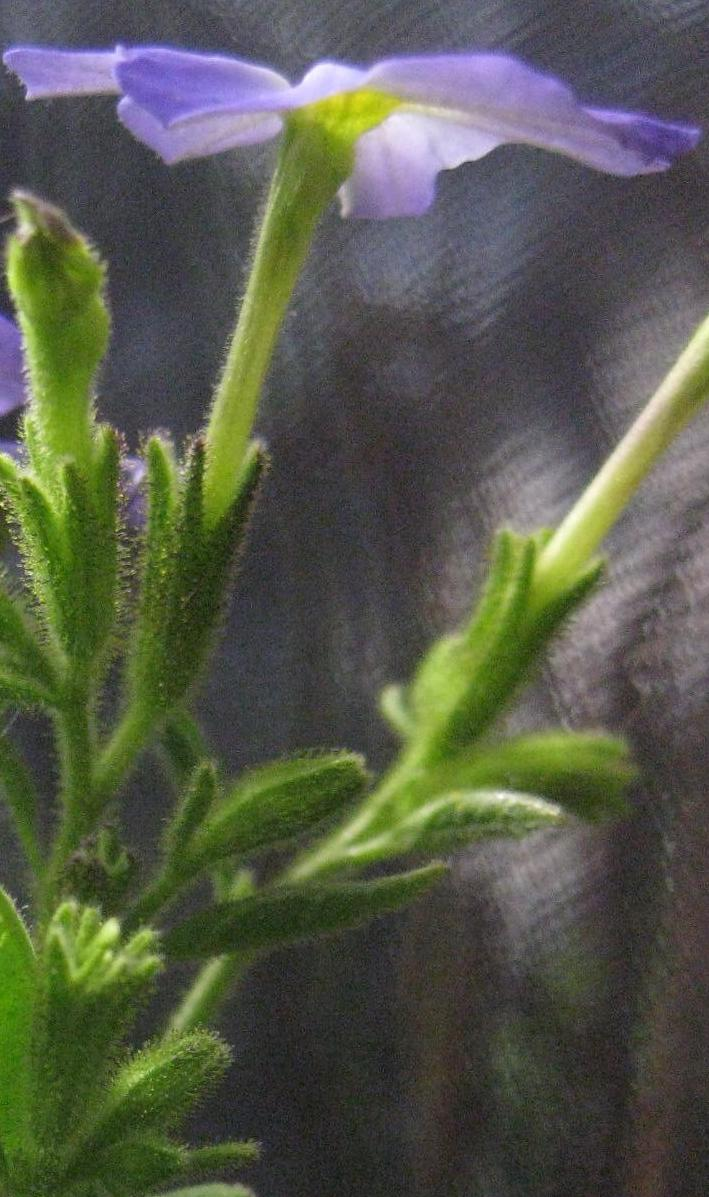
Close-up, side view of flower head of Browallia americana
