= Pacaipampa District =

Coordinates: 4°59′13″S 79°40′05″W

Pacaipampa
- District
- Interactive map of Pacaipampa
- Country: Peru
- Region: Piura
- Province: Ayabaca
- Founded: January 2, 1857
- Capital: Pacaipampa

Government
  - Mayor: Juan Manuel Garcia Carhuapoma

Area
  - Total: 981.5 km^{2} (379.0 sq mi)
- Elevation: 1,967 m (6,453 ft)

Population (2005 census)
  - Total: 25,788
  - Density: 26.27/km^{2} (68.05/sq mi)
- Time zone: UTC-5 (PET)
- UBIGEO: 200206

Pacaipampa District is one of ten districts of the province Ayabaca in Peru.
