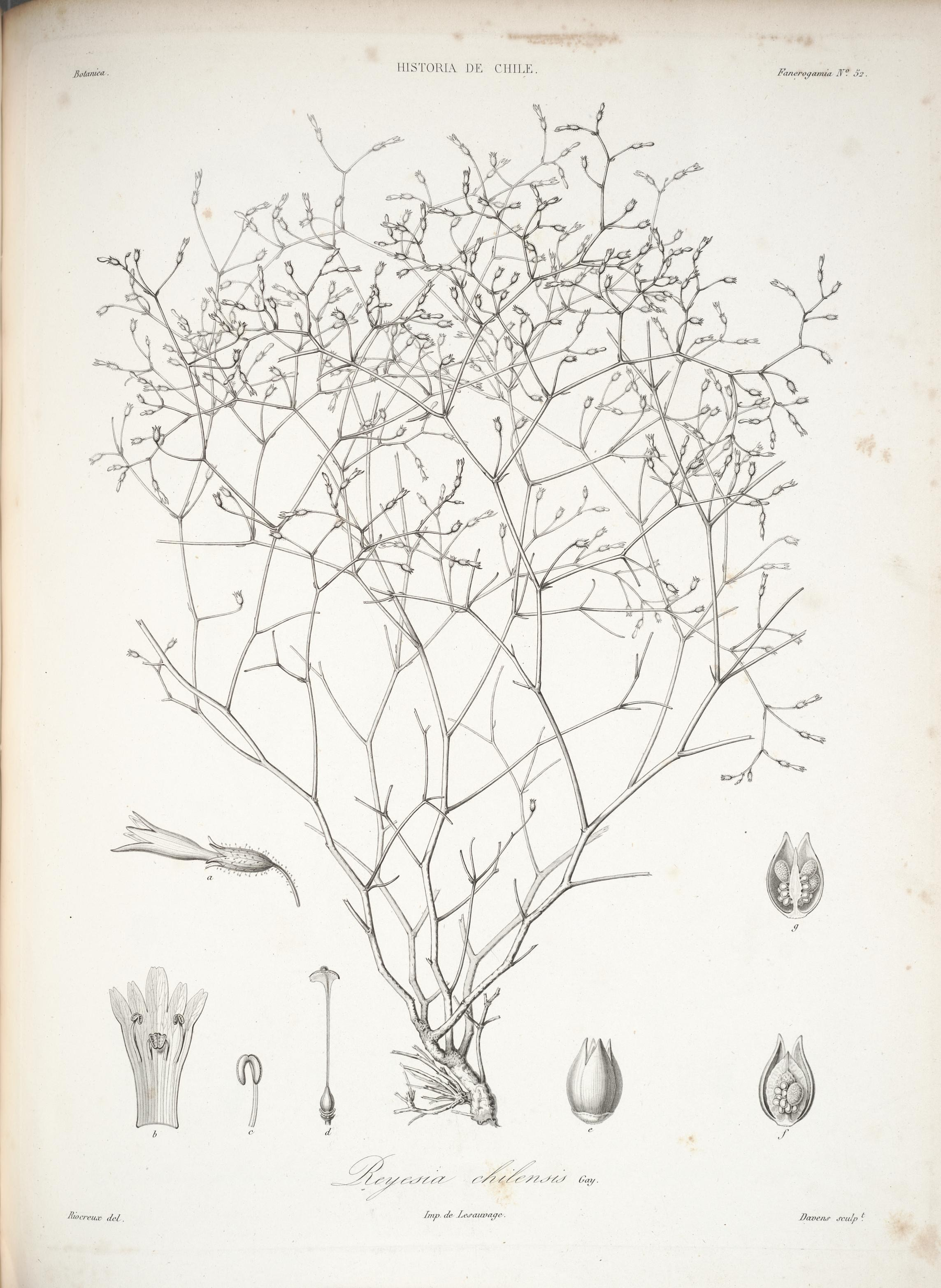
- Reyesia chilensis

Scientific classification
- Kingdom: Plantae
- Clade: Tracheophytes
- Clade: Angiosperms
- Clade: Eudicots
- Clade: Asterids
- Order: Solanales
- Family: Solanaceae
- Subfamily: Cestroideae
- Tribe: Salpiglossideae
- Genus: Reyesia; Gay

Species
- 4, see text.

Synonyms
- Pteroglossis Miers

= Reyesia =

Genus of flowering plants

Reyesia is a small genus of four species of flowering plants belonging to the subfamily Cestroideae of the nightshade family Solanaceae. It is closely related to the genus Salpiglossis, which provides the ornamental species Salpiglossis sinuata. Together, the genera Reyesia and Salpiglossis form the tribe Salpiglossideae within the Cestroideae. Historically, the species now placed in Reyesia have been held by some authors to belong to Salpiglossis, but are currently placed in a genus of their own by virtue of their tiny flowers and peculiar androecium (see description below).

== Description ==
Annuals or subshrubs (possibly also biennials) clad in sticky trichomes, the plants between 0.3 and 0.8 m in height, greatly dichotomously branched or with only one branched main stem, terminal branches spine-like. One species almost leafless: the others with lower leaves with large (circa 40 mm) pinnatifid – almost pinnatisect – blades decurrent on conspicuous petioles, or forming a basal rosette of broad leaves with long petioles. Upper leaves small, almost sessile, uppermost often reduced to tiny thread-like scales. Flowers solitary, terminal, small, pedicels 10–20 mm, calyces 2–4 mm, strongly glanduliferous – like the pedicels – with five short, equal, acute teeth; corolla zygomorphic, 6–13 mm, tubulose to funnel-shaped, violet, blue or yellow, with or without violet stripes, lobes five, of which four equal (the remaining anterior lobe slightly larger), lobes much shorter than tube; stamens included and somewhat curved towards the larger anterior corolla lobe; stamens four, in two pairs of different lengths, the posterior pair fertile with larger anthers, the lateral pair with smaller anthers, fertile (in R. chilensis) or sterile (in R. parviflora). Anthers with filaments hairless or hairy, thecae usually unequal, anthers basifixed, pollen grains free or in tetrads; Nectary pelviform, bilobed; style thread-like, hollow or solid, almost as long as longest stamens, the stigma spoon-shaped. Capsules small (circa 3–4 mm) hidden in bases of persistent calyces; seeds between two and twenty-five in number, depending on species. Testa reticulate or granulate, embryo of seed curved.

== Taxonomy ==
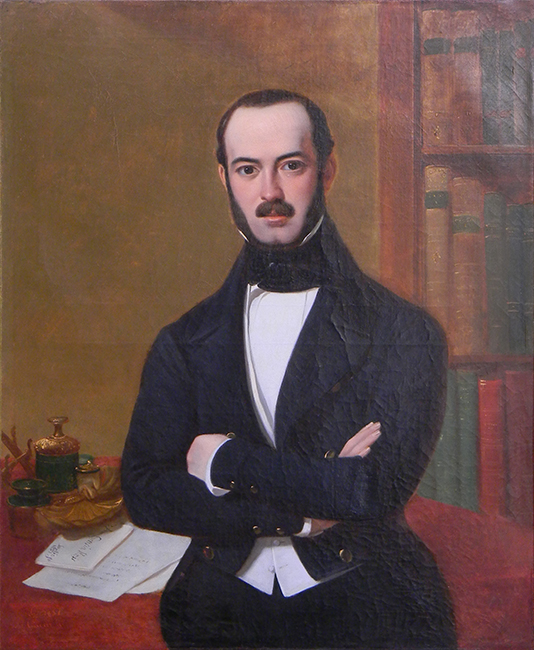
Portrait of Chilean statesman Antonio García Reyes, after whom the genus Reyesia was named; artist: Alessandro Ciccarelli Manzoni a.k.a. Alejandro Ciccarelli

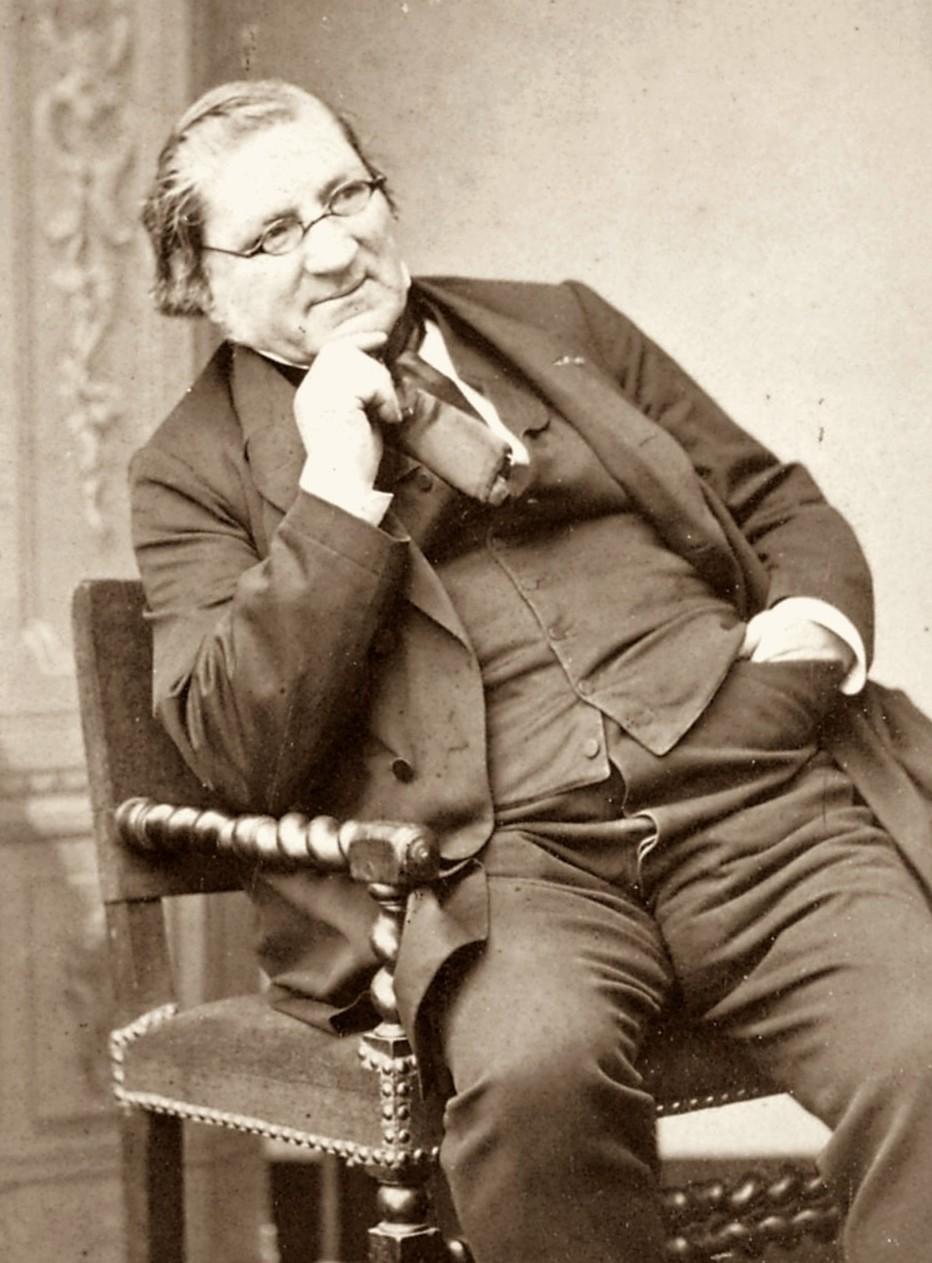
Claude Gay a.k.a. Claudio Gay Mouret, pioneer in the study of the natural history of Chile and editor of Flora Chilena, in which the genus Reyesia was described. ( Photographic portrait by Pierre Petit ).

The genus was described in 1849 by pioneering French botanist, illustrator and explorer of Chile, Claude Gay ( a.k.a. Claudio Gay Mouret ) in Flora Chilena 4(4): 418–420, t. 52. The type species is Reyesia chilensis. The genus name Reyesia commemorates Chilean politician and journalist Antonio García Reyes (1817–1855).

=== Species ===
As of March 2019, Plants of the World Online accepted four species:

- Reyesia cactorum (I.M.Johnst.) D'Arcy
- Reyesia chilensis Clos
- Reyesia juniperoides (Werderm.) D'Arcy
- Reyesia parviflora (Phil.) Hunz.

== Distribution and habitat ==
The four accepted species are found in Andean northern Chile in Antofagasta Region, Tarapacá Region, Arica y Parinacota Region, Atacama Region and Coquimbo Region.

The three species R. cactorum, R. juniperoides and R. parviflora are xerophytes growing at rather high altitudes of between 2900 m and 3500 m. The fourth species, R. chilensis, by contrast is found at much lower altitudes of between 200 m and 800 m, not far from the Pacific coast of Chile.

Although all four species are to be found in Chile, the genus is not endemic to that country, since the species Reyesia parviflora is found also in neighbouring Argentina, in Andean areas of the provinces of San Juan and Mendoza.
