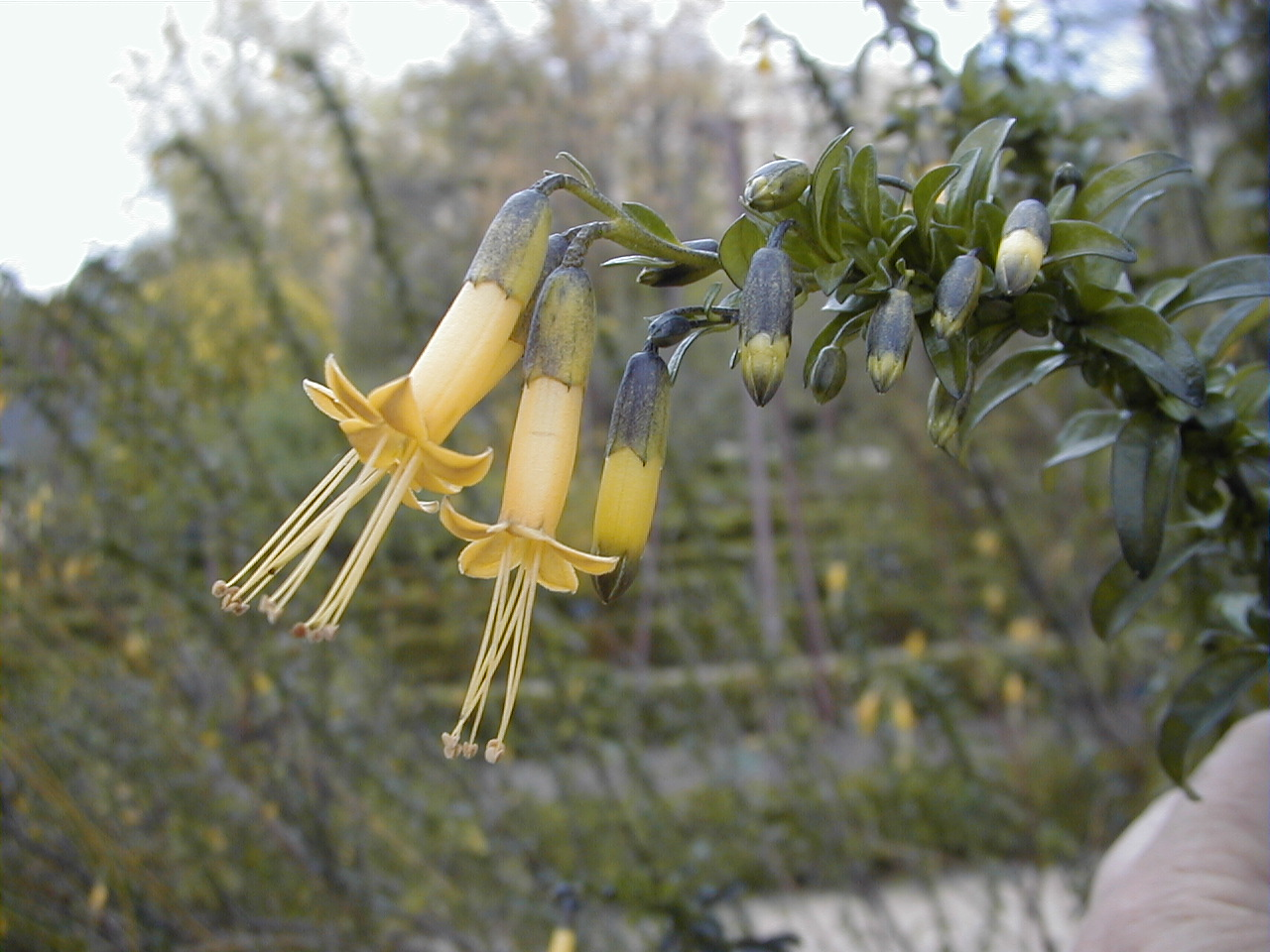

Scientific classification
- Kingdom: Plantae
- Clade: Tracheophytes
- Clade: Angiosperms
- Clade: Eudicots
- Clade: Asterids
- Order: Solanales
- Family: Solanaceae
- Subfamily: Cestroideae
- Tribe: Cestreae
- Genus: Vestia; Willd.
- Species: V. foetida

Binomial name
- Vestia foetida Hoffmanns.

= Vestia foetida =

Species of flowering plant

Vestia is a monotypic genus of flowering plants in the family Solanaceae containing the single species Vestia foetida (syn. V. lycioides). Its principal common names in the Mapudungun language of its native Chile are Huevil (pron. "wayfil" and sometimes redoubled Huevilhuevil) and Chuplín. Other Chilean names include Chuplí, Echuelcún and Palqui (negro) (this last being also applied to Cestrum parqui), while an English common name Chilean box thorn has also been coined recently in reference to a certain similarity of the plant to some species in the box thorn / wolfberry genus Lycium (as referenced also in the former specific name lycioides, meaning "Lycium-like"). Vestia foetida is endemic to central and southern Chile, being found in an area stretching from the Valparaíso Region in the north to Chiloé Island (in the Los Lagos Region) in the south. Growing to 2 m (7 ft) tall by 1.5 m (5 ft) broad, it is an evergreen shrub with glossy, privet-like, mid-green leaves. In spring and summer it bears tubular yellow flowers to 3 cm (1 in) long, with stamens so markedly exserted (= protruding) as to recall those of certain Fuchsia species, followed by 4-valved, ovoid capsules to 1 cm (0 in), containing small, prismatic seeds.

The specific epithet foetida refers to the unpleasant smell of this plant.

== Taxonomy ==
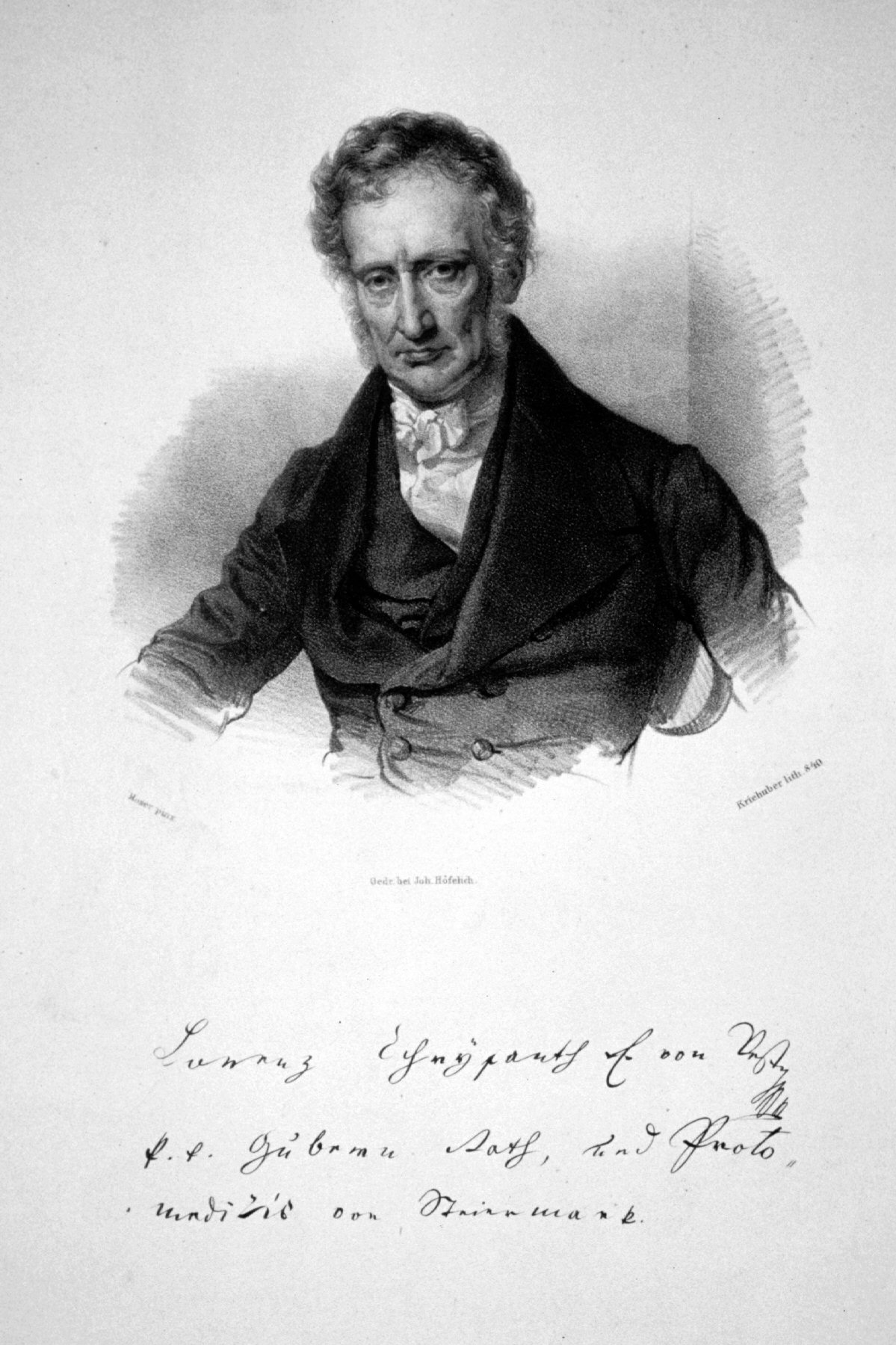
Lorenz Chrysanth von Vest, after whom the genus Vestia was named in the year 1809.

The genus Vestia was named in honour of Austrian botanist and physician Lorenz Chrysanth von Vest (1776 - 1840) in 1809 by German botanist and pharmacist Carl Ludwig Willdenow (1765 – 1812). Vestia foetida was described by Johann Centurius Hoffmannsegg, the description being published in his Verzeichniss der Pflanzenkulturen in den Grafl. Hoffmannseggischen Garten zu Dresden und Rammenau... [translation: "Directory of plants cultivated in the Dresden and Rammenau gardens of Count Hoffmannsegg"]: 119 (pub. Dresden 1824).

== Uses ==
A yellow dye has been extracted from the leaves and stems, and infusions of the plant have been used in the folk medicine of Chile (with due recognition of the toxicity of the medication) to treat dysentery and appendicitis.

Austrian priest and ethnologist, Martin Gusinde (1886-1969), an expert on the ethnomedicine of Chile, records the following concerning medicinal use of Vestia by the Mapuche and Huilliche:

Huevil: Vestia lycioides...it is used for [medicinal] baths. It is an efficacious remedy for chavalongo and dysentery and also for contagious diseases. The natives today use only the term ifɘlkoñ.

[Note: The term chavalongo designates a Chilean disease concept which, in the past, could encompass not only typhoid and typhus but a variety of life-threatening diseases (mostly fevers) having in common their introduction to Chile by Europeans - see page Chavalongo on Wikipédia España].

To the observations of Gusinde may be added further information provided by another missionary active in Chile: Capuchin friar Ernest Wilhelm Mösbach (1882-1963) who notes in his Botánica Indígena de Chile that Vestia foetida causes sneezing and has a very bitter taste. He also lists three further medicinal uses, noting that infusions of the plant possess tonic, stomachic and anthelmintic properties.

[Note: there is a page 'Ernesto Wilhelm de Moesbach' on Wikipédia España]

Sanchez (2001), quoting several previous authors, supplies not only a rationale for the use of Vestia in medicinal baths (- as a type of topical analgesic for arthritic pain), but also an evocative definition of the folk ailment chavalongo:

Huevil: Febrifugal plant. (Cañas) See also entry huelcún. Ruiz and Pavón say that the natives take [both] the decoction and the infusion of huévil to 'mitigate the ardour of the blood' in cases of chavalongo (bilious fever) and also in cases of dysentery. It is also used, in baths, in certain cases of rheumatism, both acute and chronic. (Murillo : 620).

A comparison of a cluster Chilean vernacular names used for Vestia foetida, Cestrum parqui and even the unrelated, Apocynaceous Cynanchum lancifolium (= Diplolepis pachyphylla) - as recorded by Gusinde, Mösbach and Sanchez - while revealing a measure of potential confusion in identification of medicinal species in the literature, demonstrate nonetheless a native Chilean grasp of similarity of characteristics and effects. Mösbach records the names Ifelcón and Echuelcún for V. foetida. The first of these is a variant form of Gusinde's Ifəlcoñ (also recorded as designating Vestia).

== Toxicity: Stock Poison ==
Like many plants belonging to the nightshade family, Solanaceae, Vestia is poisonous and alkaloidal. A scientific paper of 2005 noted that V. foetida has caused fatalities in sheep, goats and cattle which had browsed its foliage, death being attributable to hepatotoxic compounds present in the plant. The paper further noted that stock poisoning caused by Vestia resembles closely that caused by Cestrum parqui - another (closely related) Solanaceous plant native to the region (the genera Vestia and Cestrum both belong to tribe Cestreae of the Solanaceae - as does a third genus, Sessea).

== Insecticidal Properties ==
Vestia foetida exhibited modest activity in a recent investigation into the insecticidal properties of some plant species native to Chile. Extracts from V. foetida were evaluated against the pest beetle species Sitophilus granarius, the Granary or Wheat Weevil. Total extracts at concentrations of 2.5 percent w/w in diet over a period of 6 days displayed insecticidal effects, with V. foetida causing the mortality of 56 percent of insects (as compared with a more impressive 87.5 percent for Drimys winteri and 80 percent for Lobelia tupa).

== Chemistry ==
Toxic compounds detected in the plant include quercetin-3-diglucoside, isoquercetin, an indole alkaloid belonging to the β-carboline group and the phytosteroid sapogenin diosgenin - the last-mentioned compound better-known as a constituent of certain species belonging to the yam genus Dioscorea, although occurring also in the Solanaceous genus Cestrum. Another steroidal compound present both in Cestrum and Vestia is the obscure insonuatigenin.

== Cultivation ==
Although frost-hardy, the plant requires some protection from winter winds. It has gained the Royal Horticultural Society's Award of Garden Merit.
