= Nomen illegitimum =

Latin term meaning "illegitimate name", used mainly in botany

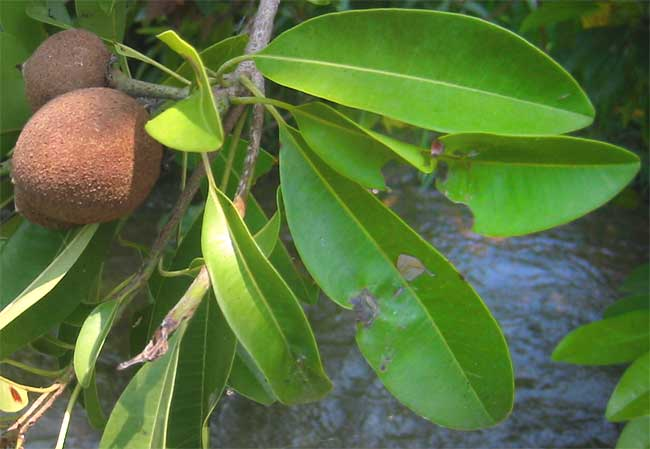
Achras sapota is both a Nomen illegitimum and a nomen superfluum and is properly called Manilkara zapota

Nomen illegitimum (Latin for illegitimate name) is a technical term used mainly in botany. It is usually abbreviated as nom. illeg. Although the International Code of Nomenclature for algae, fungi, and plants uses Latin terms as qualifiers for taxon names (e.g. nomen conservandum for "conserved name", and nomen superfluum for "superfluous name"), the definition of each term is in English rather than Latin. The Latin abbreviations are widely used by botanists and mycologists.

== Definition ==
A nomen illegitimum is a validly published name, but one that contravenes some of the articles laid down by the International Botanical Congress. The name could be illegitimate because:

- (article 52) it was superfluous at its time of publication, i.e., the taxon (as represented by the type) already has a name, or
- (articles 53 and 54) the name has already been applied to another plant (a homonym).

For the procedure of rejecting otherwise legitimate names, see conserved name.

The qualification above concerning the taxon and the type is important. A name can be superfluous but not illegitimate if it would be legitimate for a different circumscription. For example, the family name Salicaceae, based on the "type genus" Salix, was published by Charles-François Brisseau de Mirbel in 1815. So when in 1818 Lorenz Chrysanth von Vest published the name Carpinaceae (based on the genus Carpinus) for a family explicitly including the genus Salix, it was superfluous: "Salicaceae" was already the correct name for Vest's circumscription; "Carpinaceae" is superfluous for a family containing Salix. However, the name is not illegitimate, since Carpinus is a legitimate name. If Carpinus were in future placed in a family where no genus had been used as the basis for a family name earlier than Vest's name (e.g. if it were placed in a family of its own) then Carpinaceae would be its legitimate name. (See Article 52.3, Ex. 18.)

A similar situation can arise when species are synonymized and transferred between genera. Carl Linnaeus described what he regarded as two distinct species of grass: Andropogon fasciculatus in 1753 and Agrostis radiata in 1759. If these two are treated as the same species, the oldest specific epithet, fasciculatus, has priority. So when Swartz in 1788 combined the two as one species in the genus Chloris, the name he used, Chloris radiata, was superfluous, since the correct name already existed, namely Chloris fasciculata. Chloris radiata is an incorrect name for a species in the genus Chloris with the same type as Linnaeus's Andropogon fasciculatus. However, if they are treated as separate species, and Linnaeus's Agrostis radiata is transferred to Chloris, then Chloris radiata is its legitimate name. (See Article 52.3, Ex. 15.)

== Examples ==
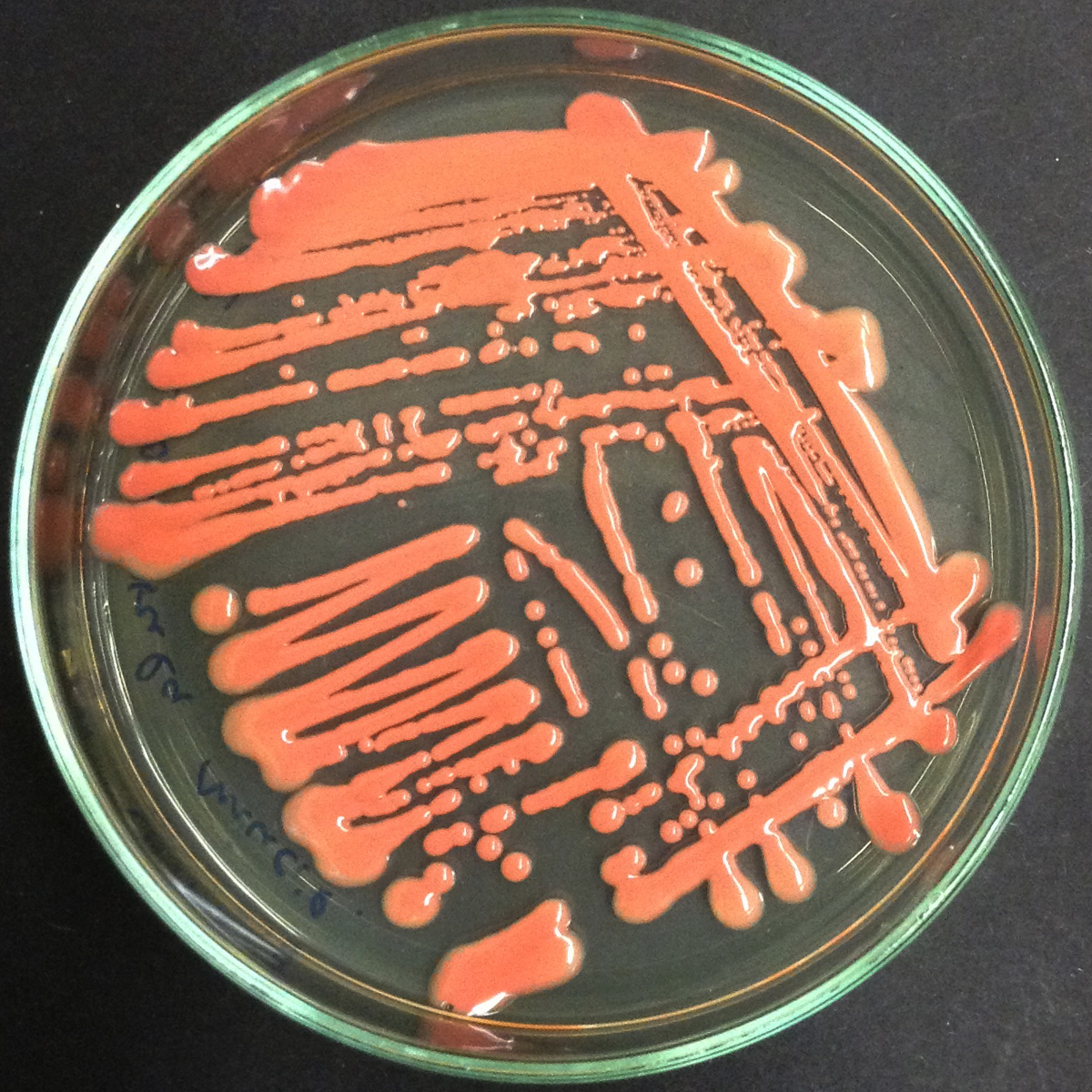
Rhodotorula rubra (Demme) Lodder, 1934 (different from Rhodotorula rubra (Schimon) F.C. Harrison, 1928) is a nom. illeg. and now called Rhodotorula mucilaginosa (A. Jörg.) F.C. Harrison, 1928

- "The generic name Cainito Adans. (1763) is illegitimate because it was a superfluous name for Chrysophyllum L. (1753), which Adanson cited as a synonym."
- "The name Amblyanthera Müll. Arg. (1860) is a later homonym of the validly published Amblyanthera Blume (1849) and is therefore unavailable for use, although Amblyanthera Blume is now considered to be a synonym of Osbeckia L. (1753)."
- "The name Torreya Arn. (1838) is a nomen conservandum and is therefore available for use in spite of the existence of the earlier homonym Torreya Raf. (1818)."

== See also ==
- Correct name (botany)
- Valid name (zoology)
- Nomen dubium
- Glossary of botanical terms
- Glossary of scientific naming
- Nomen conservandum
