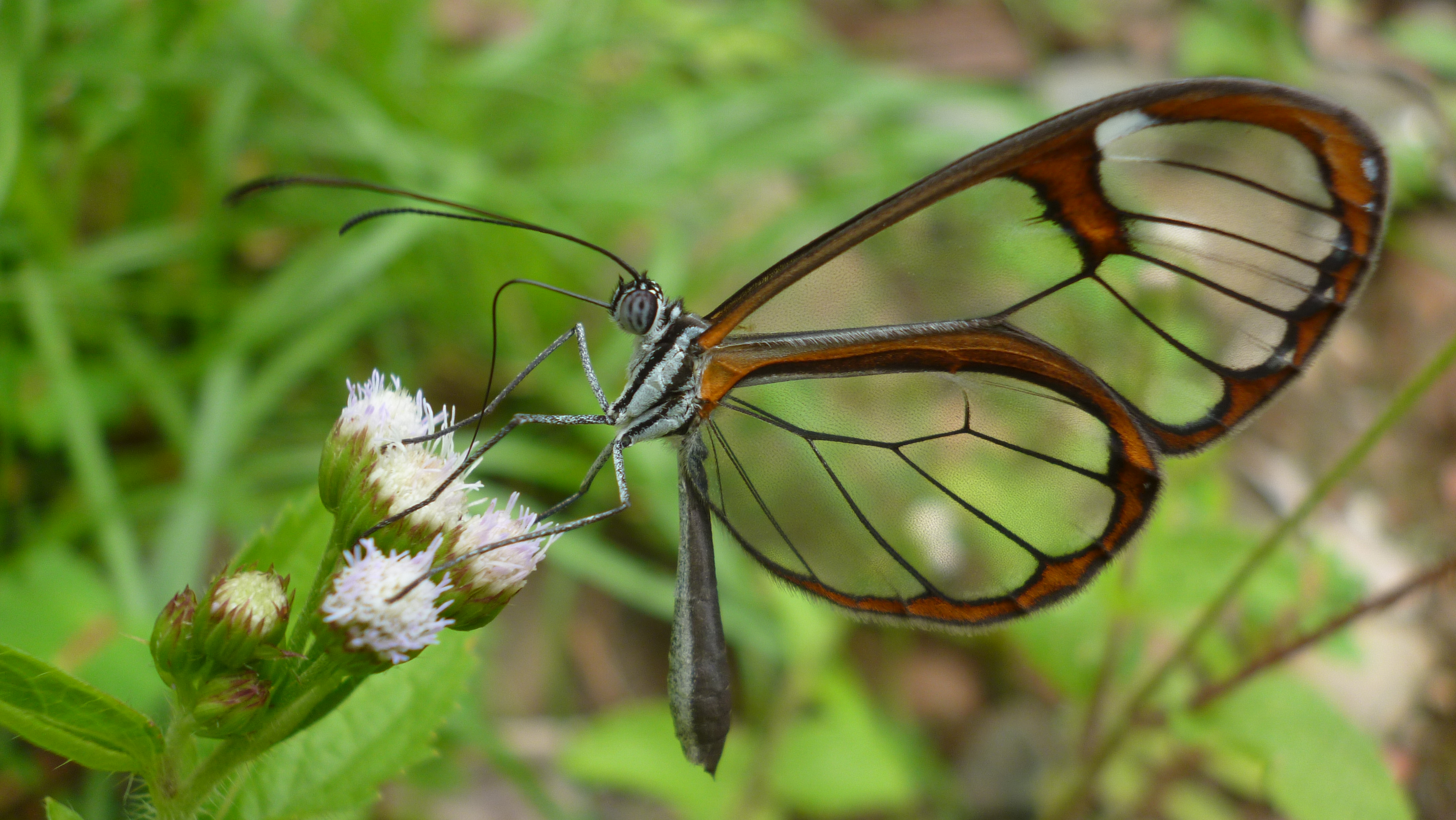

Scientific classification
- Kingdom: Animalia
- Phylum: Arthropoda
- Class: Insecta
- Order: Lepidoptera
- Family: Nymphalidae
- Genus: Pseudoscada
- Species: P. erruca

Binomial name
- Pseudoscada erruca (Hewitson, 1855)

Synonyms
- Ithomia erruca Hewitson, 1855; Episcada burmeisteri Köhler, 1929; Hypoleria arpi Zikán, 1935; Greta polissena breviala Bryk, 1953

= Pseudoscada erruca =

Species of brush-footed butterfly in tribe Ithomiini

Pseudoscada erruca is a South-American species of brush-footed butterfly in the Godyridina subtribe of Ithomiini. It was described in 1855 by William Chapman Hewitson as Ithomia erruca.

== Distribution and habitat ==
The type locality of Pseudoscada erruca is Rio Grande do Sul in Brazil. It also occurs in other parts of Brazil, such as Pernambuco, and in Argentina.

Pseudoscada erruca occurs in humid habitats with a permanent presence of water. Research in 2009 on the frequency of occurrence of species in tribe Ithomiini in old-growth tropical forest versus nearby fragmented landscapes (Note: per the research, these landscapes consist of "a matrix mostly made up of small farms and orchards, mixed with vegetation in initial stages of regeneration (2 to 8 years) and reforestation with exotic eucalyptus and pine interspersed with about 35% native vegetation") found that the presence of P. erruca was more frequent in the latter than the former.

== Behaviour ==
Females deposit individual eggs on the underside of leaves of Sessea brasiliensis and less commonly Cestrum spp., with a preference for plants at a height between 1 and 1.5 m in shaded spots. Larvae feed from the leaves of the plant on which they hatch, generally developing better on S. brasiliensis than on Cestrum species. Adults drink nectar, with a preference for the flowers of Rubus rosaefolius. Adults of P. erruca are on wing in both dry and rainy seasons.

== Parasitoids ==
Pseudoscapa erruca is host to multiple species of parasitoid wasps, with at least one species each from genera Telenomus, Trichogramma, Diadegma and Mesochorus. It has also been found parasitized by a tachinid fly species.
