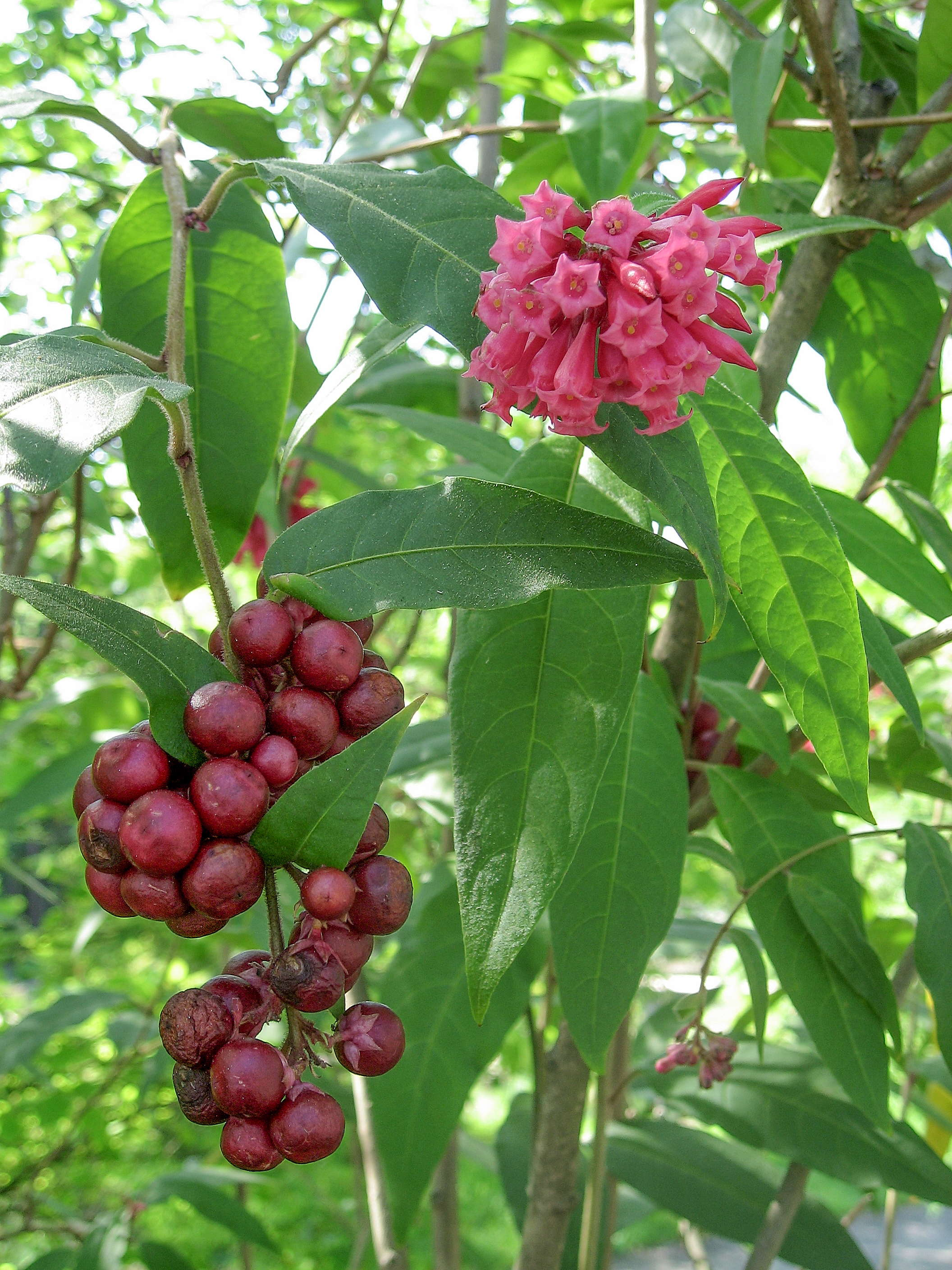
- Fruit and blossoms of Cestrum tomentosum

Scientific classification
- Kingdom: Plantae
- Clade: Embryophytes
- Clade: Tracheophytes
- Clade: Spermatophytes
- Clade: Angiosperms
- Clade: Eudicots
- Clade: Asterids
- Order: Solanales
- Family: Solanaceae
- Subfamily: Cestroideae

= Cestroideae =

Subfamily of plants

Cestroideae (syn. Browallioideae) is a subfamily of the plant family Solanaceae, the nightshades.

It currently contains the three tribes and seven genera, as follows:

- Browallieae Hunz.
  - Browallia L.
  - Streptosolen (Benth.) Miers
- Cestreae Don
  - Cestrum L.
  - Sessea Ruiz & Pav.
  - Vestia Willd.
- Salpiglossideae (Benth.) Hunz.
  - Reyesia Gay
  - Salpiglossis Ruiz & Pav.

With the (current) exceptions of the genera Sessea and Reyesia, the subfamily furnishes many colourful garden plants of considerable horticultural merit.

== Gallery ==
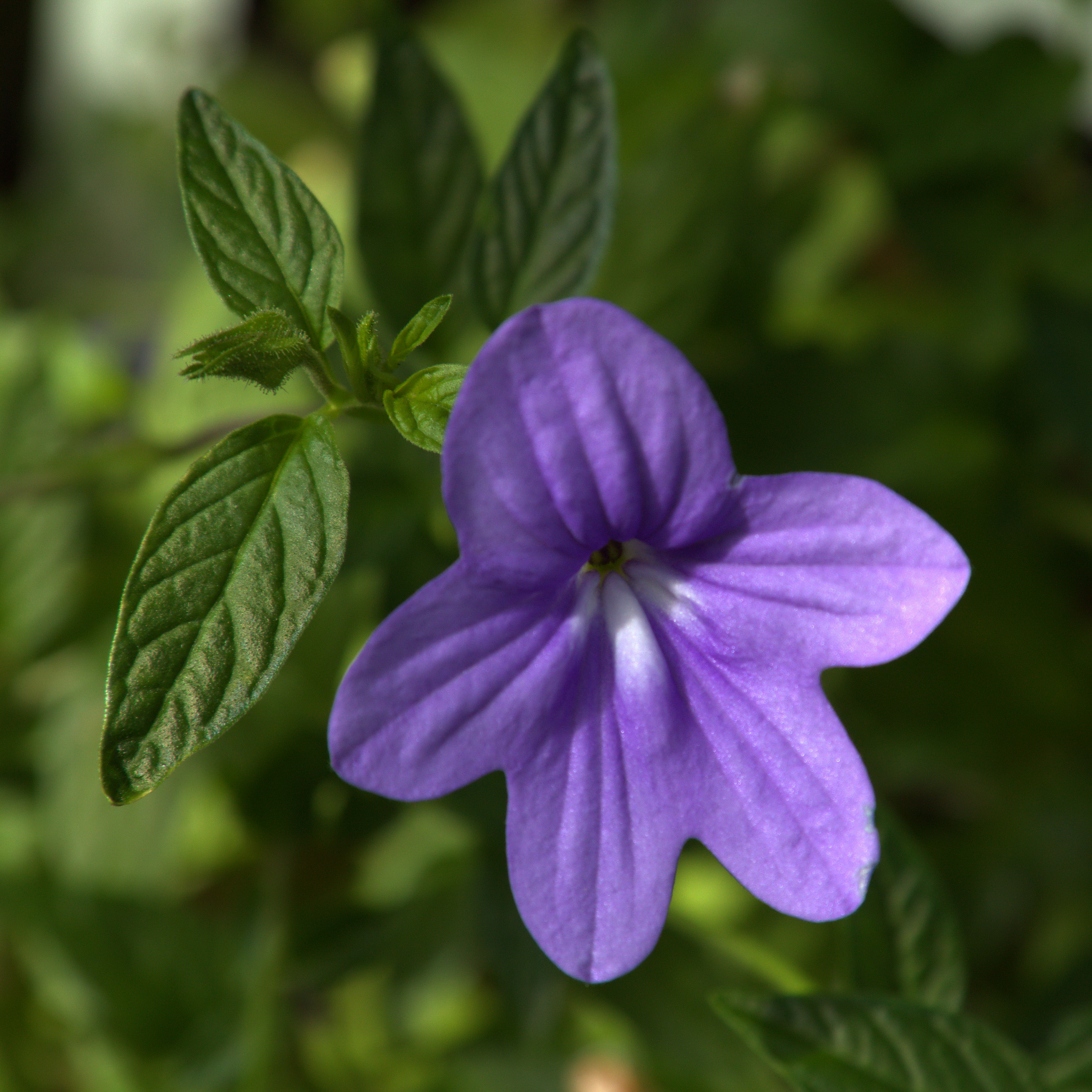
Browallia speciosa

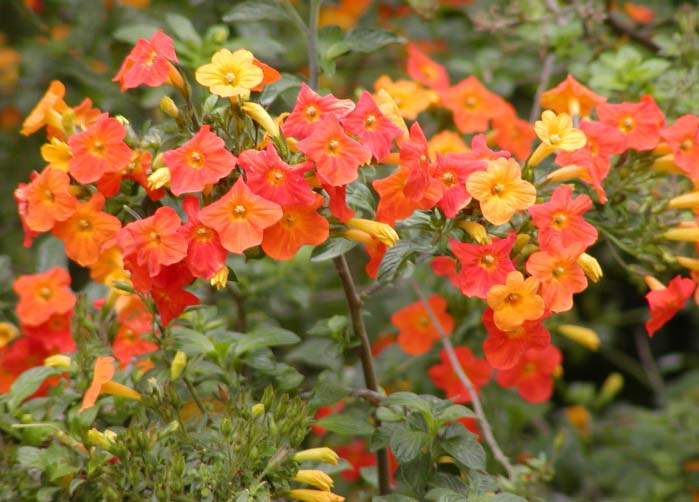
Streptosolen jamesonii

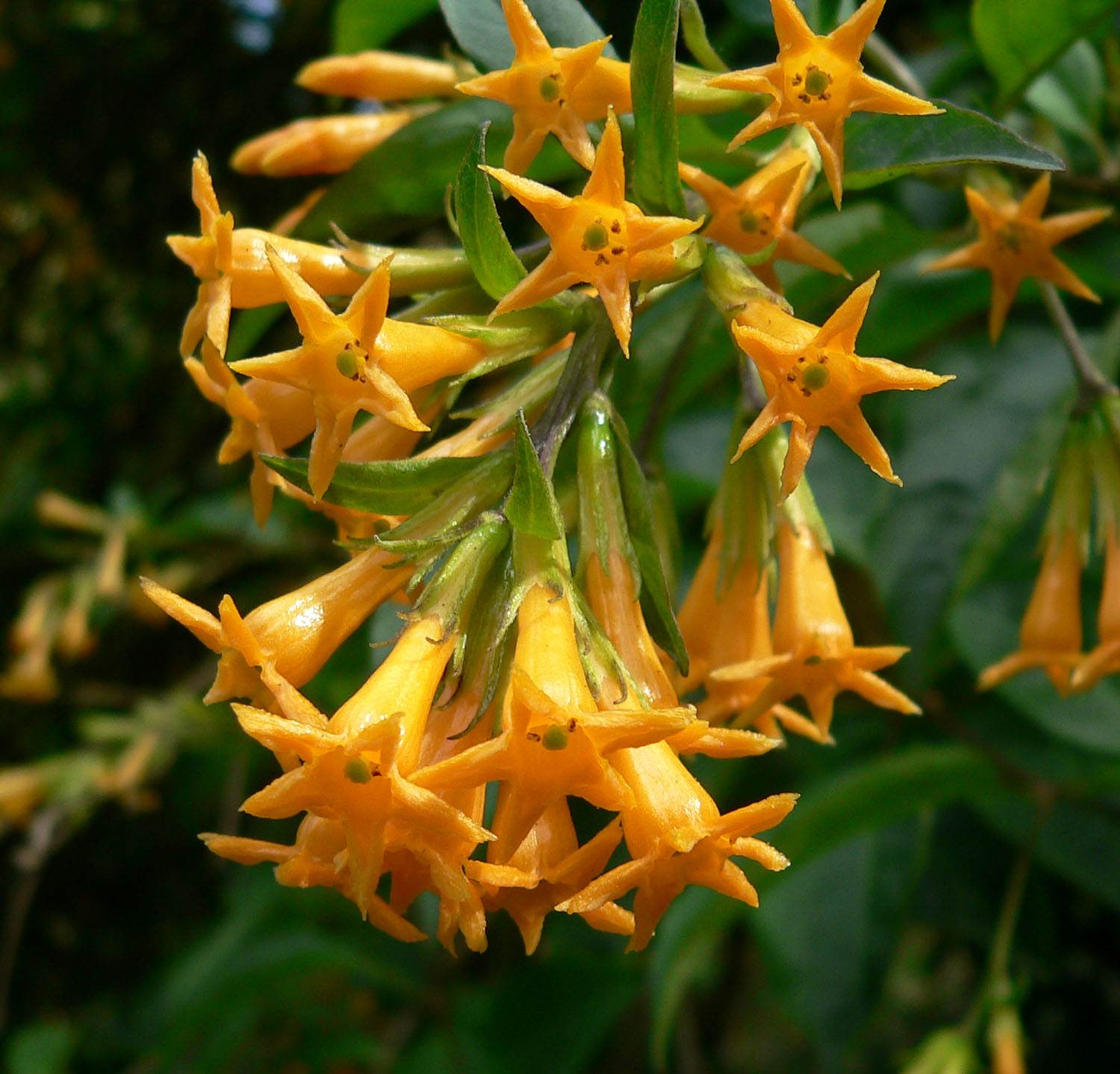
Cestrum aurantiacum

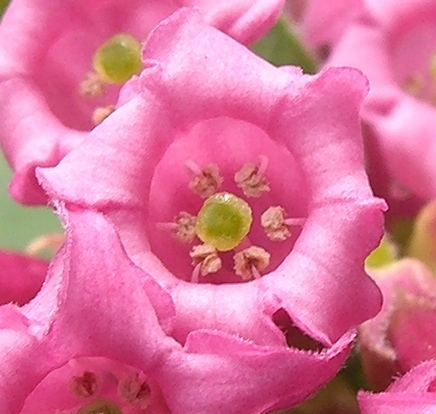
Cestrum elegans flowers in extreme close-up.

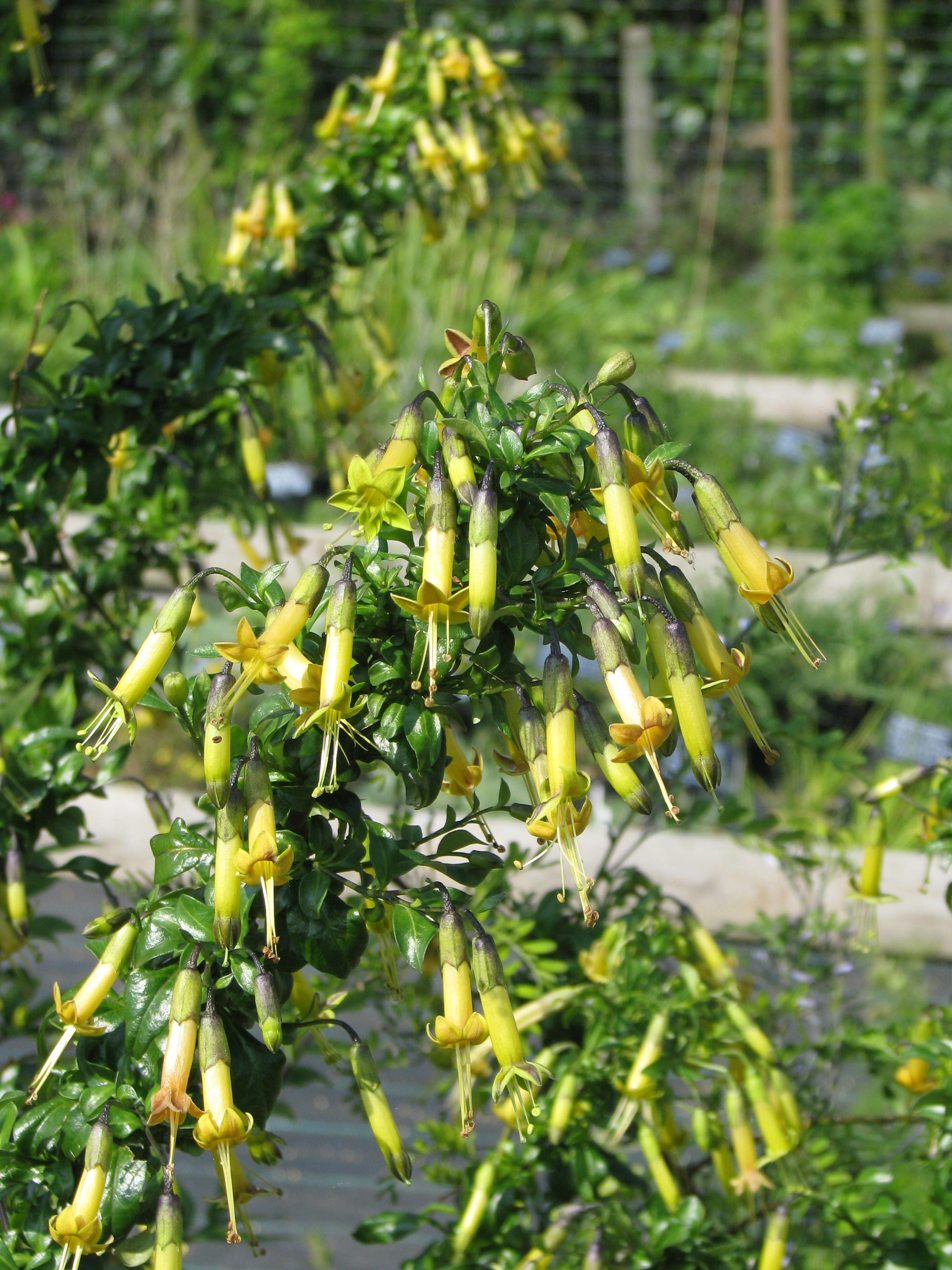
Vestia foetida

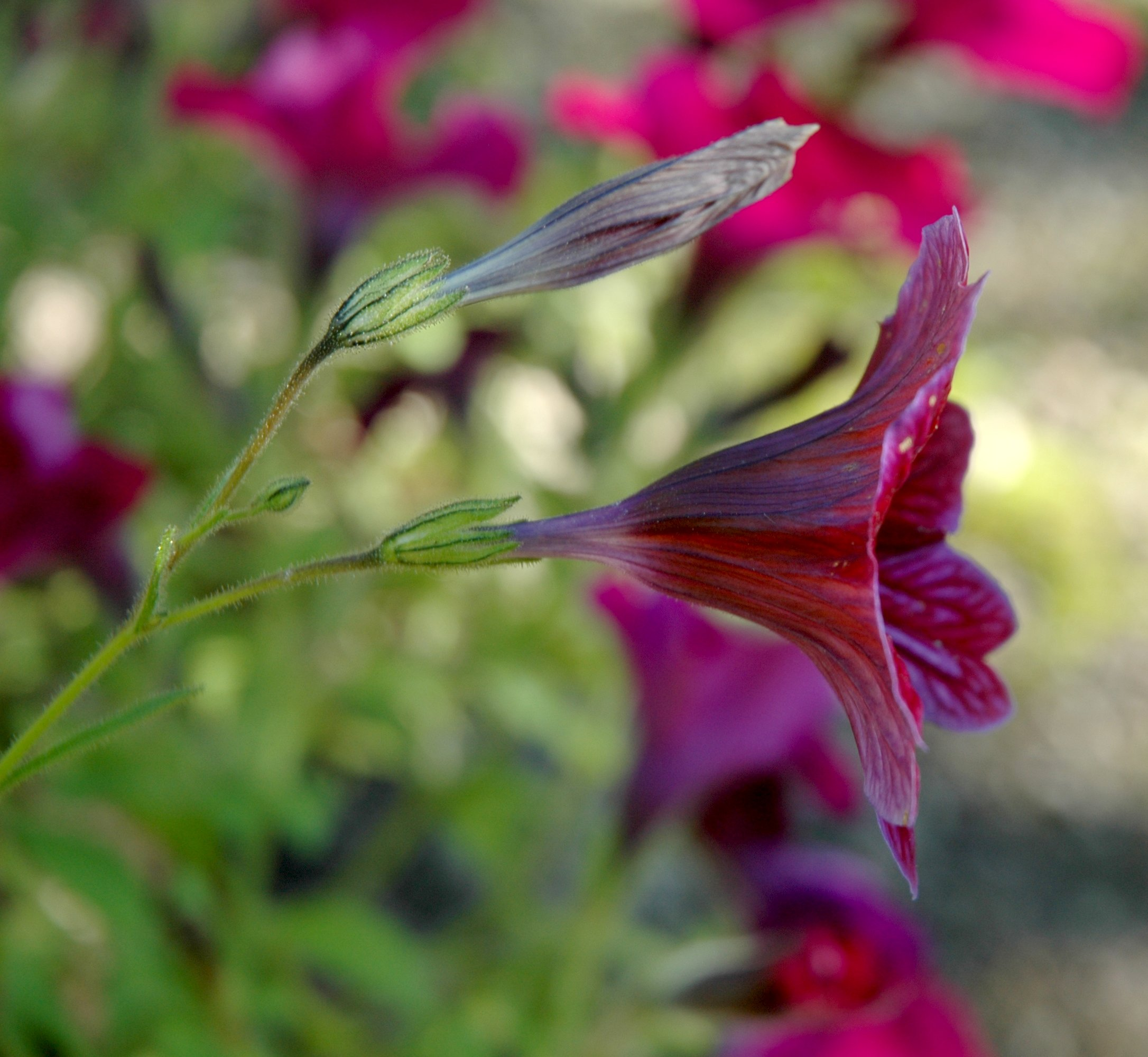
Salpiglossis sinuata flower in profile.

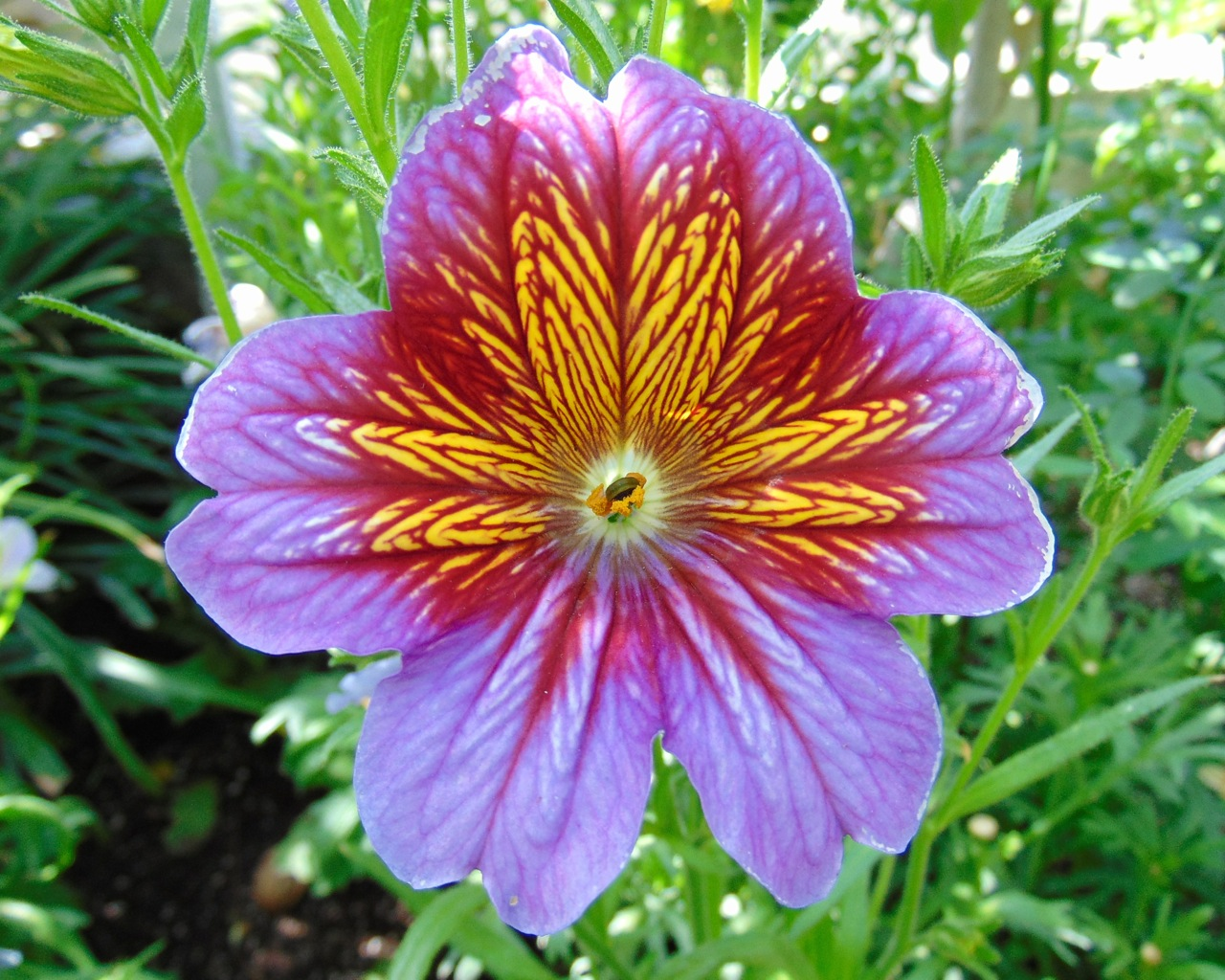
Salpiglossis sinuata close up of single flower, showing characteristic paunch-like reticulation.

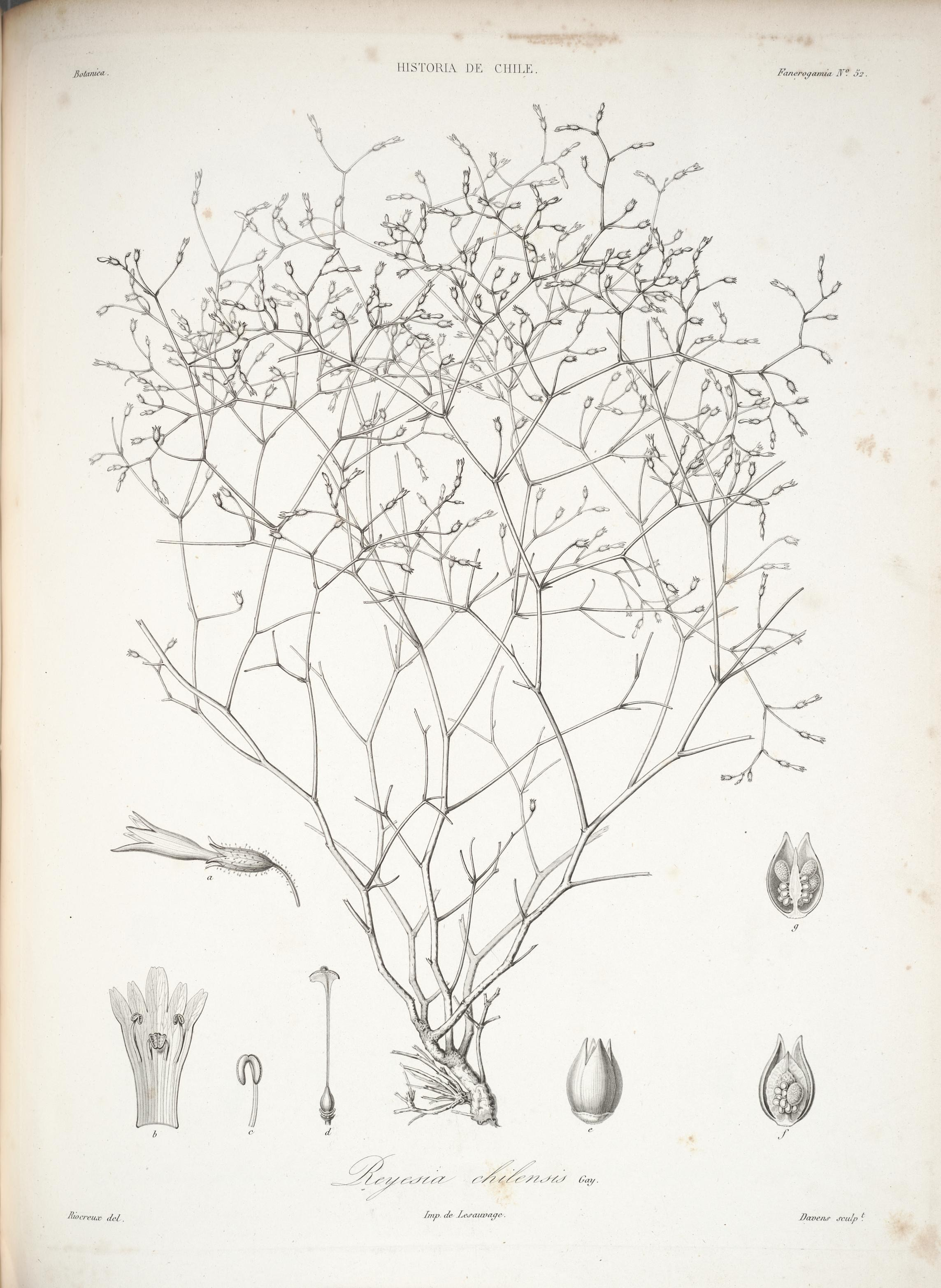
Reyesia chilensis : botanical drawing.
