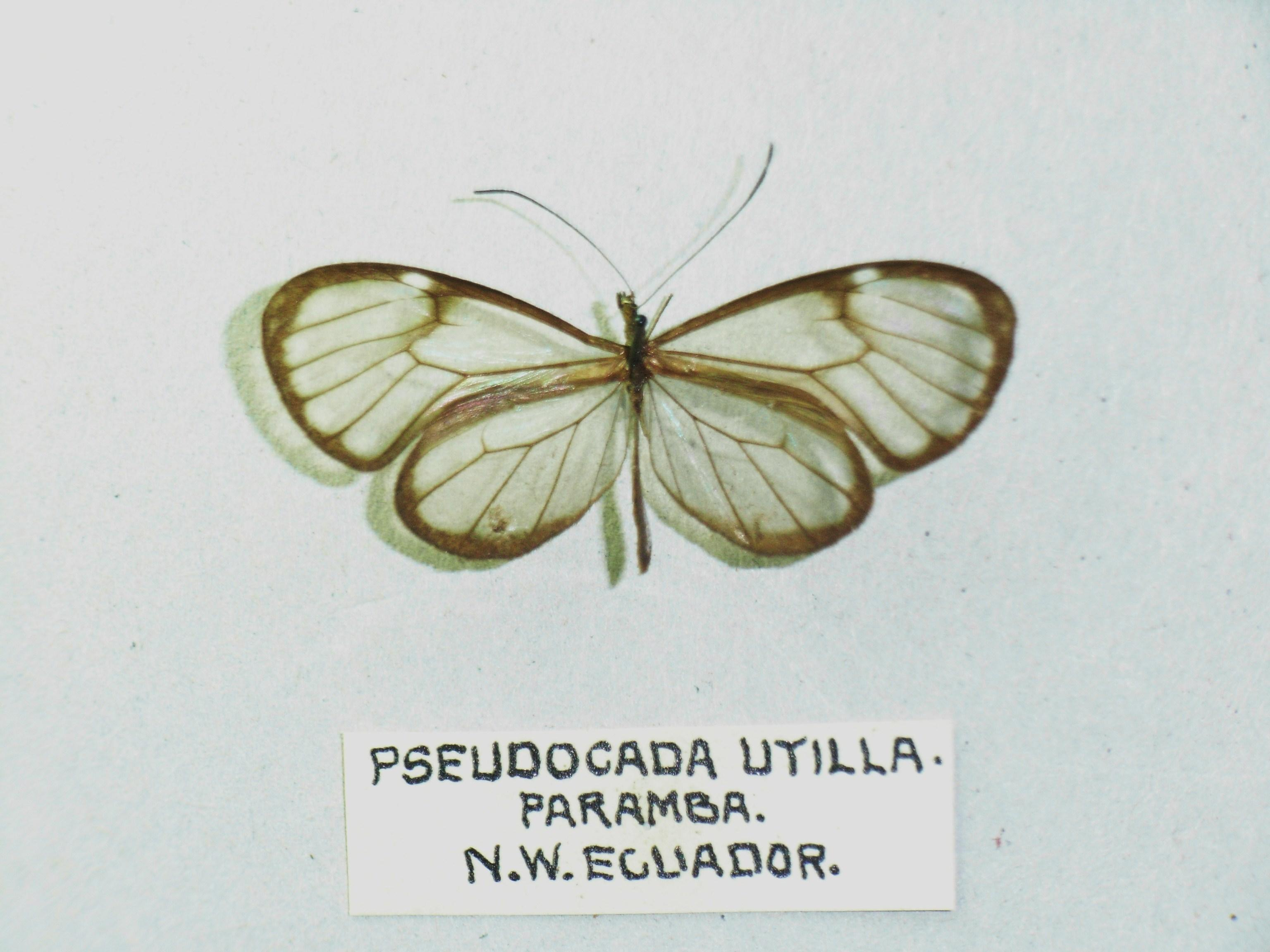
- Pseudocada utilla:Danainae:Nymphalidae

Scientific classification
- Domain: Eukaryota
- Kingdom: Animalia
- Phylum: Arthropoda
- Class: Insecta
- Order: Lepidoptera
- Family: Nymphalidae
- Tribe: Ithomiini
- Genus: Pseudoscada; Godman & Salvin, [1879]

Synonyms
- Languida d'Almeida, 1922

= Pseudoscada =

Genus of brush-footed butterflies

Pseudoscada is a genus of clearwing (ithomiine) butterflies, named by Frederick DuCane Godman and Osbert Salvin in [1879]. They are in the brush-footed butterfly family, Nymphalidae.

== Species ==
Arranged alphabetically:

- Pseudoscada acilla (Hewitson, 1867)
- Pseudoscada erruca (Hewitson, 1855)
- Pseudoscada florula (Hewitson, 1855)
- Pseudoscada timna (Hewitson, 1855)
