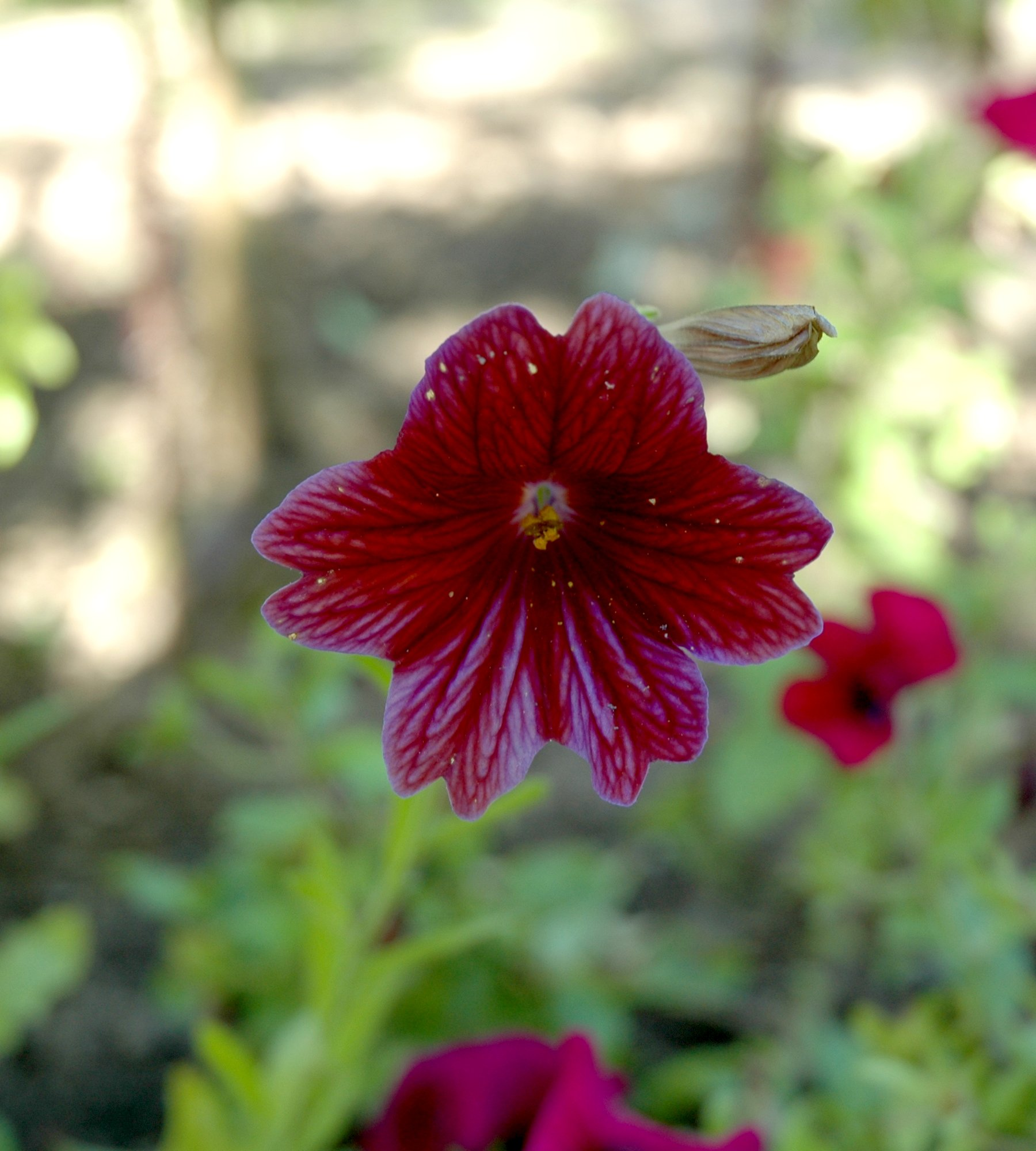

Scientific classification
- Kingdom: Plantae
- Clade: Tracheophytes
- Clade: Angiosperms
- Clade: Eudicots
- Clade: Asterids
- Order: Solanales
- Family: Solanaceae
- Subfamily: Cestroideae
- Tribe: Salpiglossideae
- Genus: Salpiglossis; Ruiz & Pav.

Species
- See text

= Salpiglossis =

Genus of plants

Salpiglossis /ˌsælpɪˈɡlɒsɪs/ is a genus of flowering plants belonging to the subfamily Cestroideae of family Solanaceae. It is closely related to the genus Reyesia, with which it makes up the tribe Salpiglossideae. Species in the genus Salpiglossis are found in Mexico, Argentina and Chile.

== Taxonomy ==
The genus name Salpiglossis is a compound of the Greek words for "trumpet" σαλπινξ ( salpinx ) and "tongue" γλώσσα ( glossa ). The relatively large flowers of Salpiglossis sinuata ( the species in general cultivation ) are prettily veined and come in a pleasing range of colours. The species grows to an average height of 75 cm.

The following species are recognised in the genus Salpiglossis:

- Salpiglossis arniatera (B.L.Rob.) D'Arcy
- Salpiglossis sinuata Ruiz & Pav.
- Salpiglossis spinescens Clos
