= Sessea sodiroi =

Conservation status
- Vulnerable (IUCN 3.1)

Scientific classification
- Kingdom: Plantae
- Clade: Tracheophytes
- Clade: Angiosperms
- Clade: Eudicots
- Clade: Asterids
- Order: Solanales
- Family: Solanaceae
- Genus: Sessea
- Species: S. sodiroi

Binomial name
- Sessea sodiroi Bitter

Species of flowering plant

Sessea sodiroi is a species of plant in the family Solanaceae, it can grow up to tree-size. It is endemic to Ecuador.

It was first published and described in Repert. Spec. Nov. Regni Veg. vol.18 on page 208 in 1922.

The specific epithet of sodiroi refers to Luis Sodiro (1836–1909), who was an Italian Jesuit priest and a field botanist, who collected many plants in Ecuador.
