= Lorenz Chrysanth von Vest =

Austrian physician and botanist

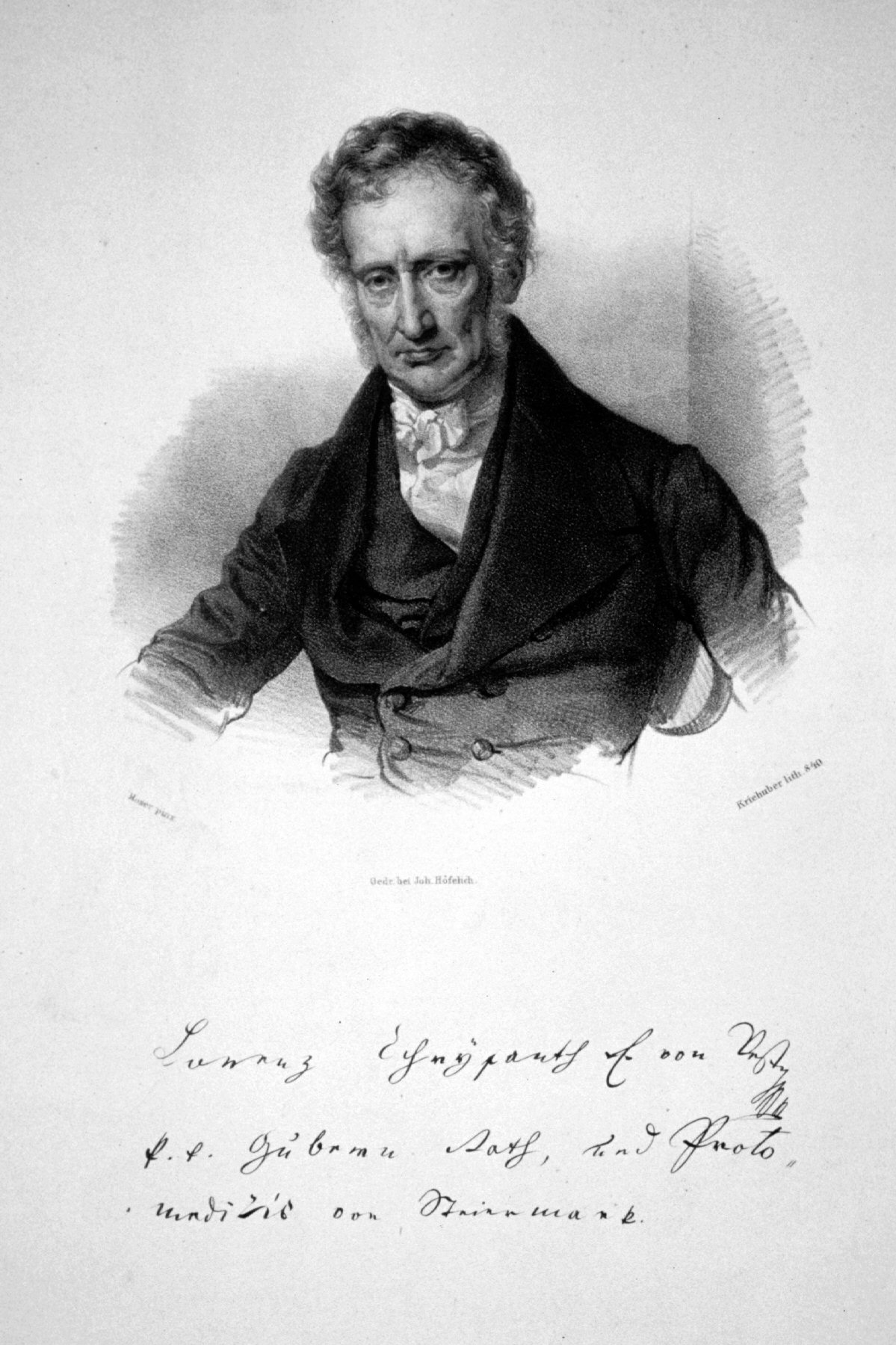
Lorenz Chrysanth von Vest; lithograph by Josef Kriehuber.

Lorenz Chrysanth Edler von Vest (18 November 1776, in Klagenfurt – 15 December 1840, in Graz) was an Austrian medical doctor and botanist.

He studied medicine in Vienna and at the University of Freiburg, where he received his doctorate in 1798. After a stint in the military, he settled into a medical practice in his hometown of Klagenfurt (1800). From 1804 to 1812 he taught classes in theoretical and practical medicine at the lyceum in Klagenfurt, and afterwards worked as a professor of botany and chemistry at the Johanneum in Graz. In 1829 he was appointed chief regional physician and health advisor to the Styrian government.

In 1809 the plant genus Vestia (family Solanaceae) was named on his honor by Carl Ludwig Willdenow.

== Selected works ==
- Manuale botanicum inserviens excursionibus botanicus, sistens stirpes totius Germaniaephanerogamas, 1805.
- Anleitung zum gründlichen Studium der Botanik, 1818 – Instructions for the thorough study of botany.
- Versuch einer systematischen Zusammenstellung der in Steyermark cultivirten Weinreben, 1826 – Essay on a systematic compilation of vines cultivated in Styria.
