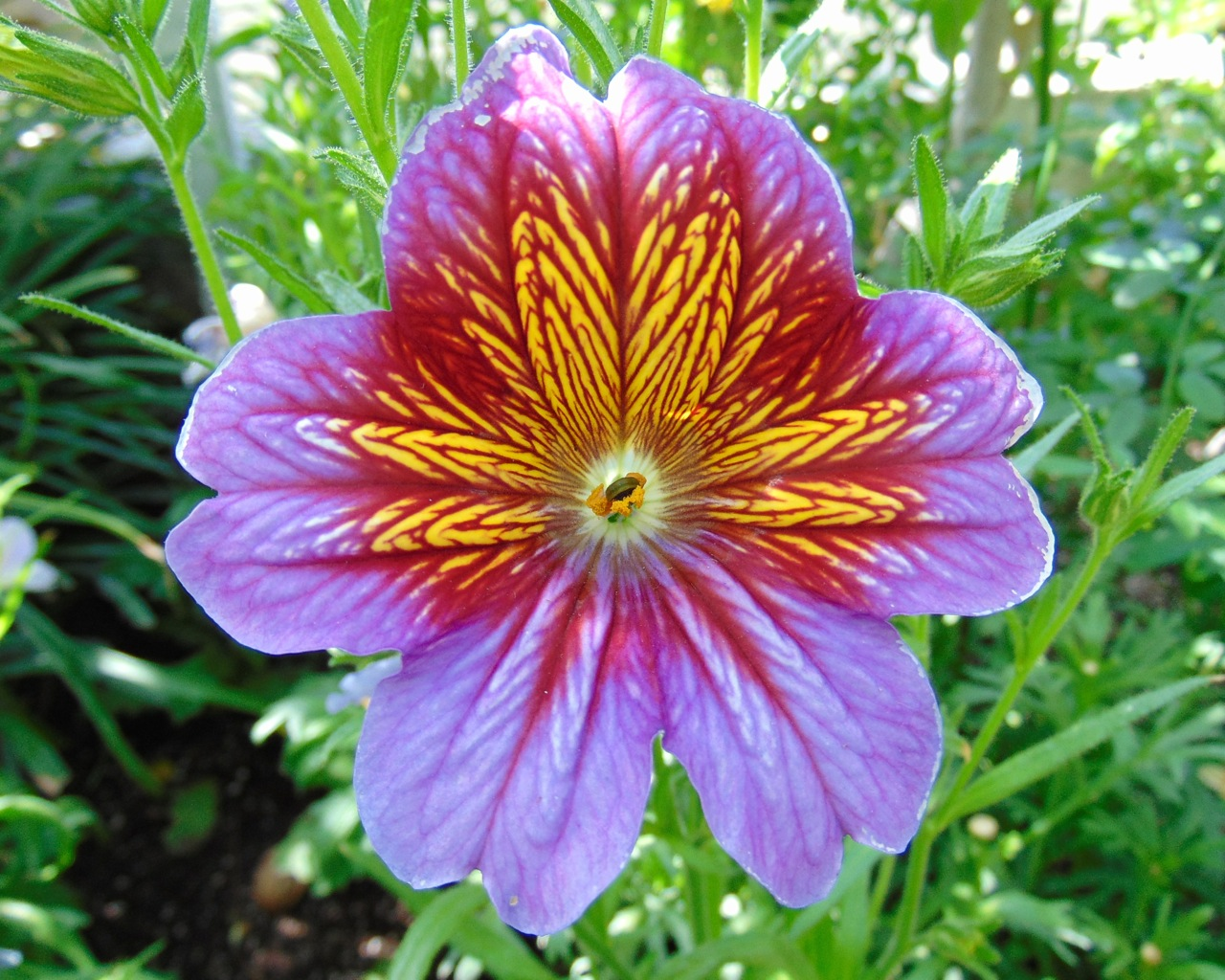

Scientific classification
- Kingdom: Plantae
- Clade: Tracheophytes
- Clade: Angiosperms
- Clade: Eudicots
- Clade: Asterids
- Order: Solanales
- Family: Solanaceae
- Genus: Salpiglossis
- Species: S. sinuata

Binomial name
- Salpiglossis sinuata Ruiz & Pav.

Synonyms
- Phyteuma tricolor Molina; Salpiglossis atropurpurea R. Graham; Salpiglossis barclayana Sweet; Salpiglossis coccinea Lindl. & Paxton; Salpiglossis fulva Court.; Salpiglossis picta Sweet; Salpiglossis purpurea Miers; Salpiglossis straminea Hook.

= Salpiglossis sinuata =

Species of plant

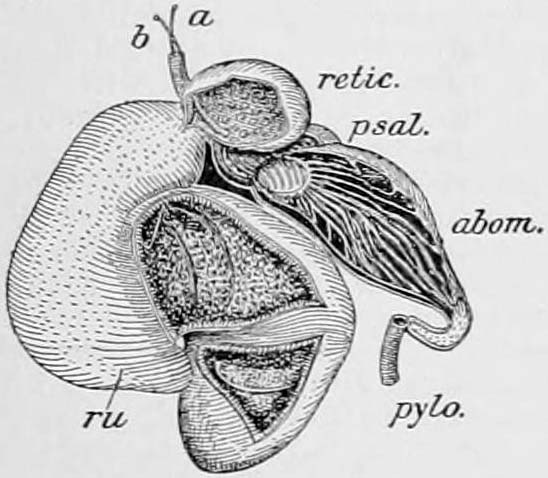
Interior of ruminant's paunch / rumen ( Spanish : panza ) showing net-like patterns similar to those of flower of Salpiglossis sinuata - whence Spanish common name panza de burro ( "donkey's paunch" ) - also a name given to a blanket of low cloud similarly patterned.

Salpiglossis sinuata, the painted tongue, scalloped tube tongue, velvet trumpet flower, palito amargo ( Spanish : bitter little stick - from the extreme bitterness of its leaves) or panza de burro ( Spanish : donkey's paunch ), is a flowering plant belonging to the subfamily Cestroideae of the nightshade family Solanaceae, native to southern Chile.

== Description ==
Salpiglossis sinuata is an annual or short-lived perennial herbaceous plant growing to 60 cm (2.0 ft) tall, rarely up to 1 m (3.3 ft) tall. The leaves are 4–10 cm (1.6–3.9 in) long, elliptic to lanceolate, with a wavy, lobed or toothed margin.

The flowers have a five-lobed funnel-shaped corolla, up to 7 cm (2.8 in) long and 5.5 cm (2.2 in) diameter, each lobe with a notched apex, velvety in texture, either violet or orange, and have contrasting darker stripes along each petal.

== Cultivation and uses ==
Of the two species in its genus, Salpiglossis sinuata is the more commonly grown as an ornamental plant for gardens. It was introduced to the northern hemisphere in the 1820s.

A number of cultivars have been selected for different flower colours. It is grown in full sunlight.

== Gallery ==
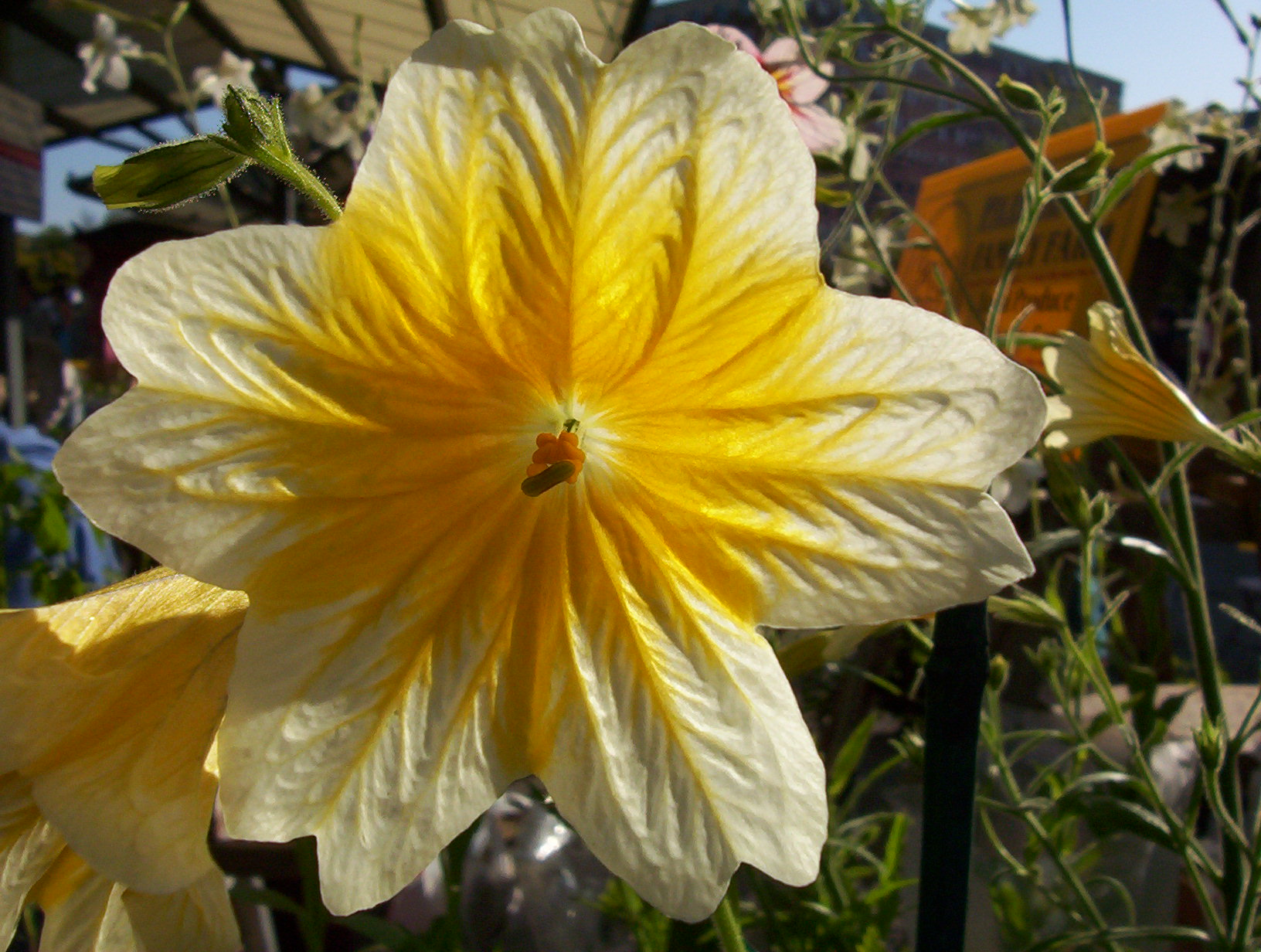
Close-up of flower of yellow-flowered cultivar of S. sinuata.

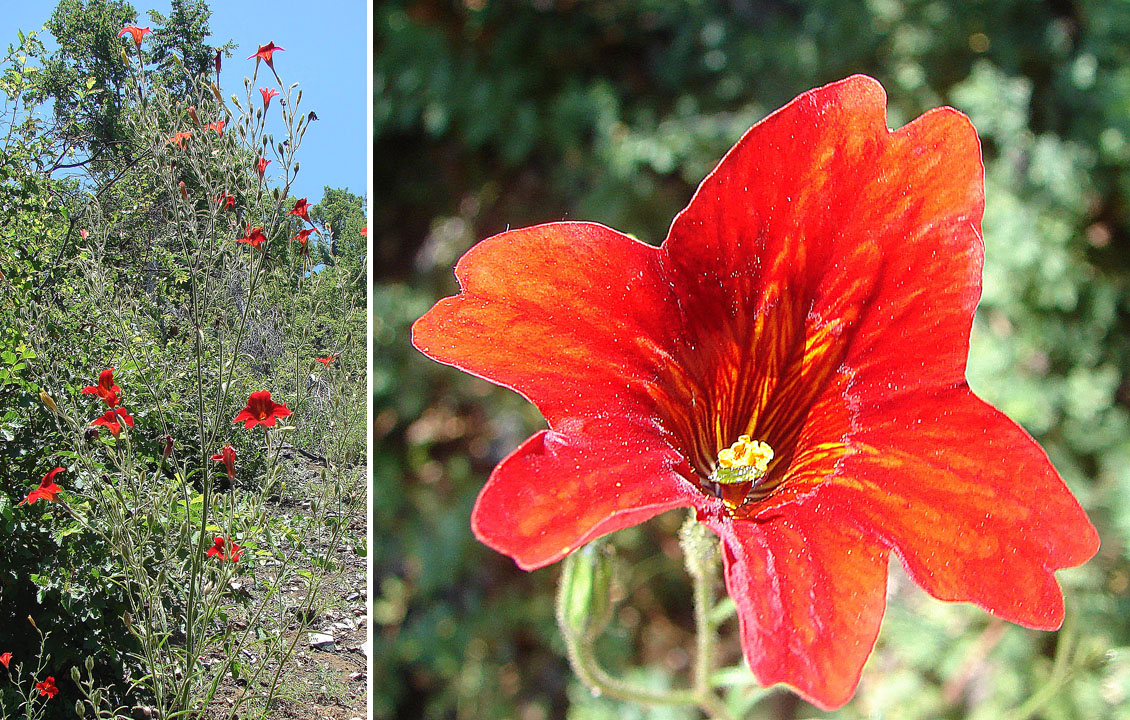
S. sinuata : habit study and close-up of giant red-flowered form.

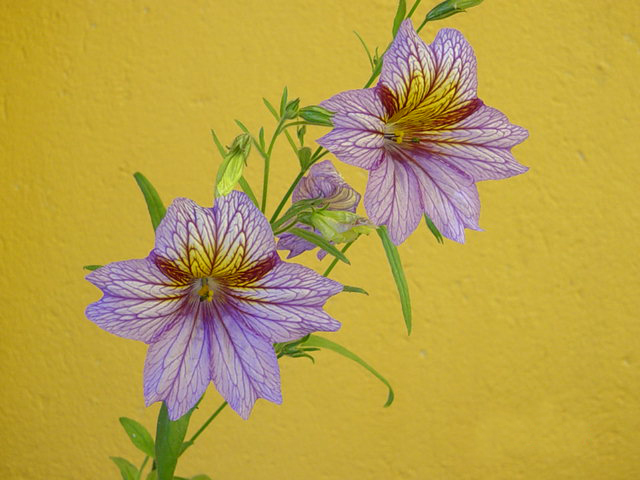
S. sinuata : close-up of pale purple-flowered form.

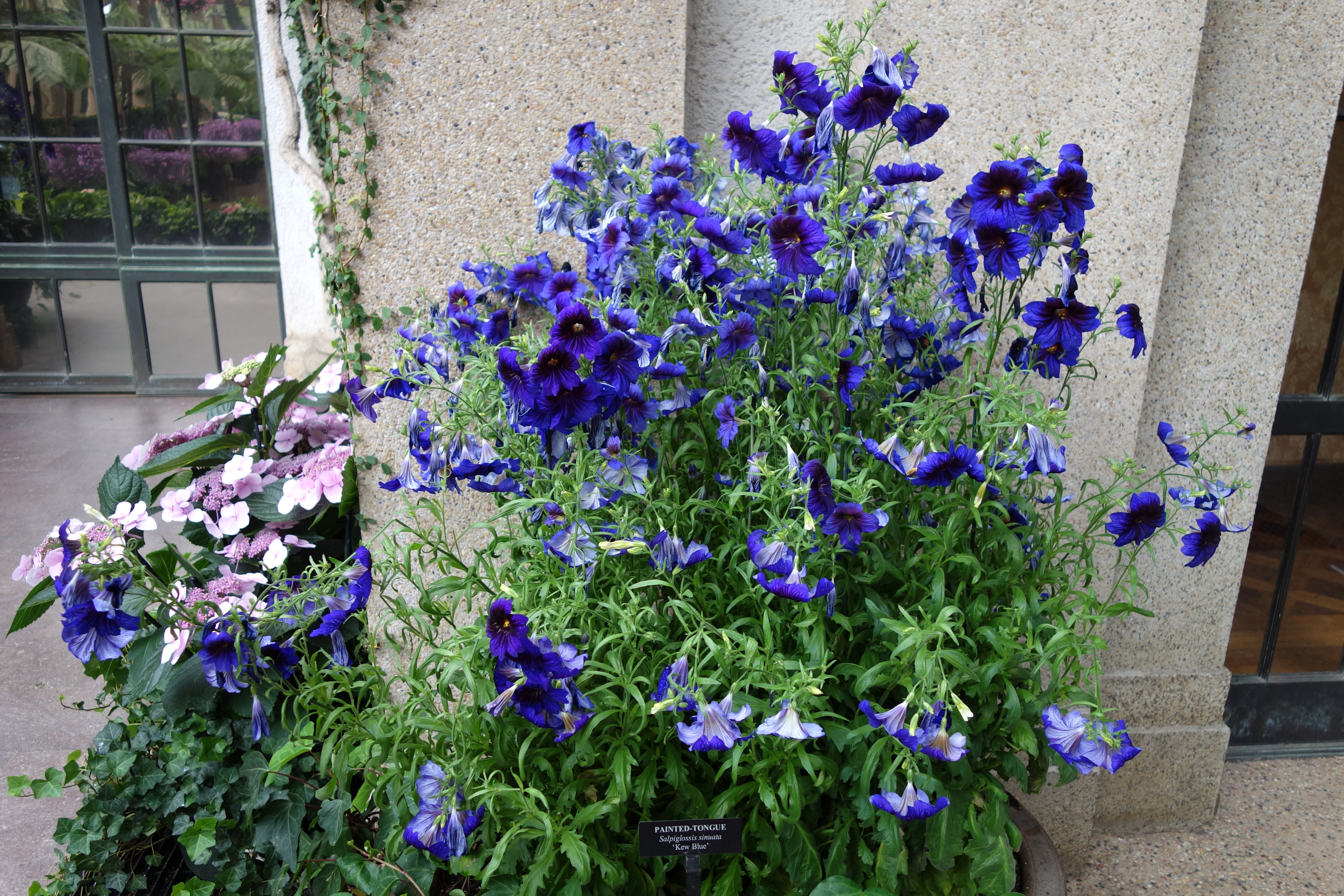
Growth habit of blue-flowered form "Kew Blue".

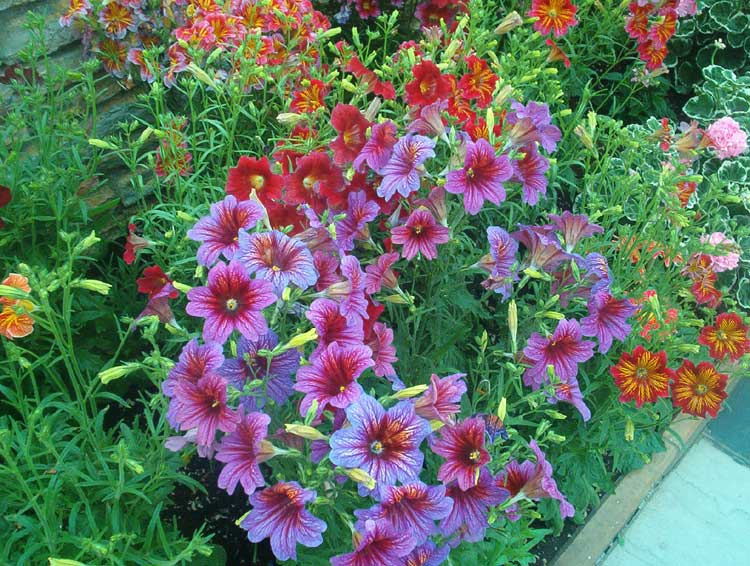
Bed of Salpiglossis sinuata plants with flowers of three different colours.
