= Sessea brasiliensis =

Conservation status
- Data Deficient (IUCN 2.3)

Scientific classification
- Kingdom: Plantae
- Clade: Tracheophytes
- Clade: Angiosperms
- Clade: Eudicots
- Clade: Asterids
- Order: Solanales
- Family: Solanaceae
- Genus: Sessea
- Species: S. brasiliensis

Binomial name
- Sessea brasiliensis Toledo

Species of flowering plant

Sessea brasiliensis is a species of plant in the family Solanaceae. It is endemic to Brazil.
