= Sessea =

Scientific classification
- Kingdom: Plantae
- Clade: Embryophytes
- Clade: Tracheophytes
- Clade: Angiosperms
- Clade: Eudicots
- Clade: Asterids
- Order: Solanales
- Family: Solanaceae
- Subfamily: Cestroideae
- Tribe: Cestreae
- Genus: Sessea; Ruiz & Pav.

Family of shrubs and trees

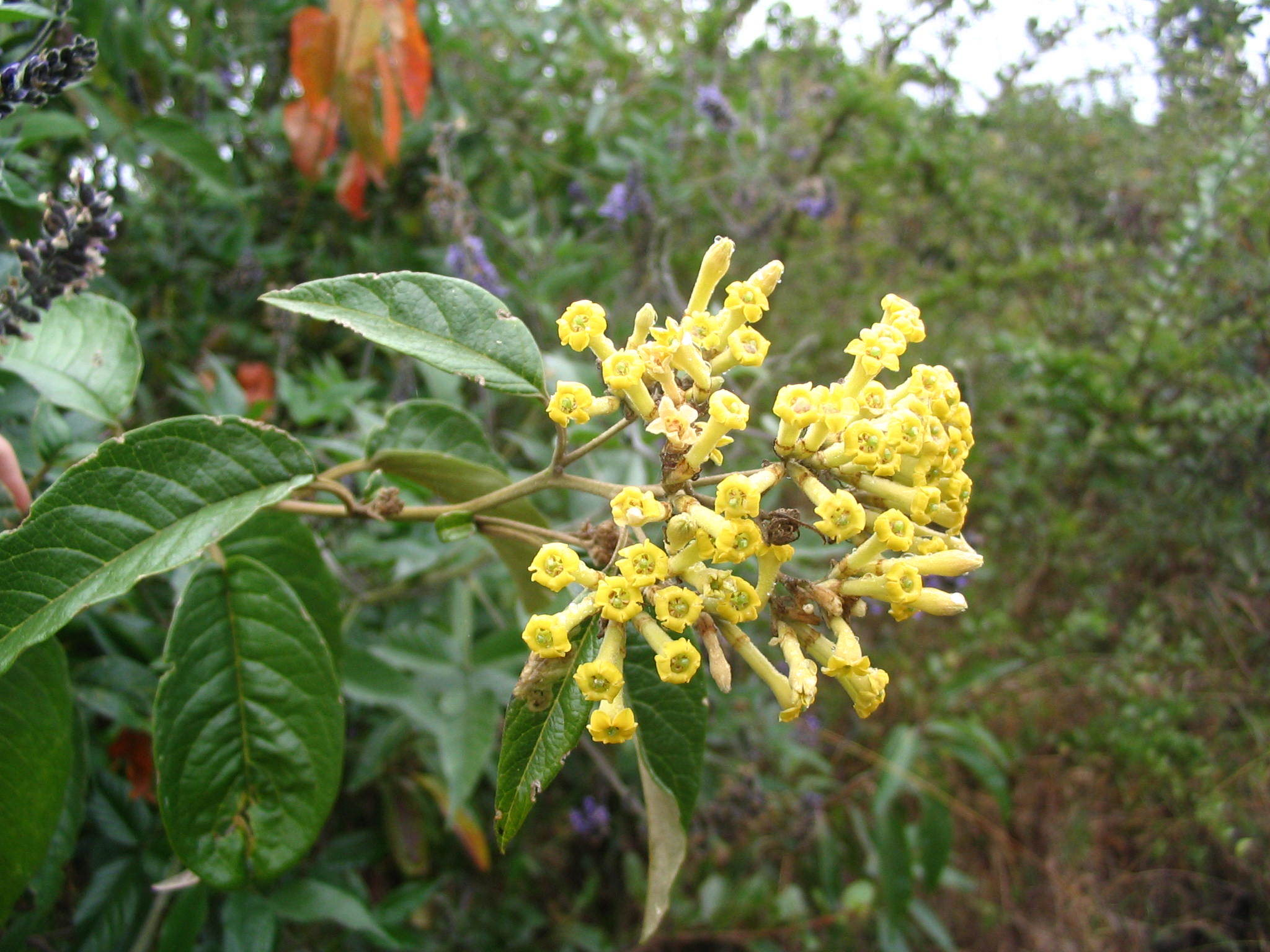
Sessea stipulata

Sessea is a genus of 19 accepted species of shrubs, small trees and climbers belonging to the subfamily Cestroideae of the plant family Solanaceae. The flowers of Sessea are so similar to those of Cestrum that the genera cannot usually be told apart, unless the plants are in fruit. Then their distinguishing characteristics become immediately apparent; plants of the genus Sessea bearing dehiscent capsules dispersing winged seeds, while those belonging to the genus Cestrum bear juicy berries containing prismatic seeds. The flowers of both Sessea and Cestrum have tubular corollas that are long exserted from small calyces.

== Taxonomy ==
The genus commemorates Spanish botanist Martín Sessé y Lacasta, was described by Nicholas Edward Brown and was published in Florae Peruvianae, et Chilensis Prodromus 21,1794 by Hipólito Ruiz López and José Antonio Pavón Jiménez. The type species is: Sessea stipulata Ruiz & Pav.

== Species ==
Accepted species include:

- Sessea acuminata Francey
- Sessea andina Francey
- Sessea brasiliensis Toledo
- Sessea colombiana Francey
- Sessea confertiflora Francey
- Sessea corymbiflora Goudot ex Rich. Taylor & R. Phillips
- Sessea crassivenosa Bitter
- Sessea dependens Ruiz & Pav.
- Sessea discolor Francey
- Sessea elliptica Francey
- Sessea herzogii Dammer
- Sessea jorgensenii Benítez
- Sessea lehmannii Bitter
- Sessea macrophylla Francey
- Sessea multinervia Francey
- Sessea sodiroi Bitter native to Ecuador
- Sessea stipulata Ruiz & Pav.
- Sessea tipocochensis (Werderm.) Francey
- Sessea vestioides (Schltdl.) Hunz.
- Sessea vestita Miers

== Toxicity ==
Experiments conducted in Pindamonhangaba between 1963-65, demonstrated the toxicity of Sessea brasiliensis on cattle. Symptoms of poisoning began approximately 12 hours after ingestion of the plant, consisting of apathy, anorexia, decreased intensity and number of rumen movements, muscle tremors, and unsteady gait. In total, three animals died during the experiments, two of which within 24 hours of the first symptoms.

The study concluded that S. brasiliensis poisoning was very similar, or even identical, to that of Cestrum laevigatum; a species used to induce hallucinations by the Krahô tribe for spiritual purposes.
