= List of women linguists =

A linguist is someone who engages in the academic discipline of linguistics. Due to social and institutional forces, women in linguistics have been marginalized leading to significant interest in both the causes of and solutions to gender bias in linguistics.

== A ==
Name	Description	Image
Abbi, Anvita	Indian linguist, scholar	
Abbott, Barbara	American linguist	
Adamou, Evangelia	Contact linguist and specialist in endangered languages	
Adelswärd, Viveka	Conversation analysis and institutional interaction	
Aikhenvald, Alexandra	Linguist	
Aissen, Judith	Linguist and Mayan specialist	
Aitchison, Jean	Linguist and writer	
Alexiadou, Artemis	Greek linguist and syntactician	
Allen, Shanley	Canadian linguist and acquisitionist	
Anagnostopoulou, Elena	Greek linguist and syntactician	
Antas, Jolanta	Polish linguist	
Archangeli, Diana	American linguist	
Ariel, Mira	Israeli linguist, developer of Accessibility Theory	
Armstrong, Lilias	(1882–1937) British phonetician	
Arvaniti, Amalia	Greek phonetician and phonologist	
Arregui, Ana	Formal semanticist	
Ashraf, Syeda Ummehani	Linguist	
Atkins, Beryl	Professional lexicographer	
Wendy Ayres-Bennett	British philologist and historian of linguistic thought	

== B ==
Name	Description	Image
Bagchi, Tista	Indian linguist and ethicist	
Baird, Jane	Scottish Esperantist and lexicographer	
Baird, Jessie Little Doe	Indigenous linguist and revitalization specialist	
Bakró-Nagy, Marianne	Hungarian historical linguist and Finno-Ugrist	
Bannon, Ann	(b. 1932) Lesbian pulp fiction author and linguist	
Baptista, Marlyse	Cape Verdean contact linguist	
Barber, Katherine	British-born Canadian lexicographer	
Bardovi-Harlig, Kathleen	American applied linguist	
Baron, Naomi	American linguist and digital communication specialist	
Bartsch, Renate	German linguist and philosopher of language	
Bazzanella, Carla	Italian pragmaticist and sociolinguist	
Beck, Sigrid	German semanticist	
Beckman, Mary	American linguist, prosodist and acquisitionist	
Beddor, Patrice	American phonetician and phonologist	
Béguelin, Marie-José	Swiss linguist	
Behrens, Heike	German psycholinguist	
Bell, Jeanie	Australian specialist in Aboriginal languages	
Bellugi, Ursula	German-American linguist and cognitive neuroscientist	
Berez-Kroeker, Andrea	American documentary linguist	
Berezovich, Elena	Russian onomastician and ethnolinguist	
Berg, Helma van den	Dutch linguist and Caucasian specialist	
Bergman, Brita	Swedish signed-language linguist	
Berko Gleason, Jean	American psycholinguist and Wug Test creator	
Berman, Ruth A.	South African-Israeli linguist and Hebraicist	
Bermúdez, Eloína Miyares	Cuban linguist and lexicographer	
Bernot, Denise	French linguist and Burmese specialist	
Biagi, Maria Luisa Altieri	Italian historical linguist	
Bishop, Judith	Australian poet, linguist and translator	
Blake, Renée A.	Caribbean American sociolinguist	
Blau, Joyce	Egyptian-French linguist and Kurdish specialist	
Bleek, Dorothea	South African-born German anthropologist and philologist	
Blevins, Juliette	American phonetician, phonologist and historical linguist	
Blumstein, Sheila	American neurolinguist	
Borer, Hagit	Israeli-born American theoretical linguist and syntactician	
Bowerman, Melissa	Max-Planck-based American acquisitionist/psycholinguist	
Bowern, Claire	US-based Australian historical linguist	
Boyce, Mary	British linguist and specialist in Iranian languages and Zoroastrianism	
Brentari, Diane	American linguist and sign-language specialist	
Bresnan, Joan	American syntactician and founder of Lexical-Functional Grammar	
Briggs, Jean	American-born anthropologist, ethnographer and linguist	
Bril, Isabelle	French linguist and typologist specialising in Austronesian languages	
Bromwich, Rachel	British philologist and Celtic specialist	
Broselow, Ellen	American experimental linguist	
Browman, Catherine	American linguist and speech scientist	
Brown, Penelope	American anthropological linguist	
Brugman, Til	Dutch author, poet and linguist	
Buchi, Éva	Swiss linguist, lexicographer and Romance specialist	
Bucholtz, Mary	American sociolinguist and anthropological linguist	
Bull, Tove	Norwegian linguist, first female rector of the University of Tromsø	
Burlak, Svetlana	Russian linguist and Indo-Europeanist	
Burridge, Kate	Australian linguist and Germanicist	
Butt, Miriam	German computational linguist and syntactician	
Bybee, Joan	American linguist, pioneer of the usage-based approach	

== C ==
Name	Description	Image
Cacoullos, Rena Torres	American linguist	
Çambel, Halet	Archaeologist and decipherer of Anatolian hieroglyphs	
Cameron, Deborah	British linguist	
Canger, Una	Danish linguist	
Carlier, Anne	Linguist of French	
Cassell, Justine	American human-computer interaction specialist	
Catach, Nina	French linguist and historian	
Cataldi, Lee	Australian poet and linguist	
Catrileo, María	Mapuche linguist	
Charity Hudley, Anne H.	American linguist	
Chaski, Carole	American linguist	
Chelliah, Shobhana	Indian-American linguist	
Chen, Yiya	Phonetician and prosody specialist	
Cheng, Lisa	Syntactician	
Cheshire, Jenny	British linguist	
Chevalier, Marion Frances	Philologist	
Choi, Soonja	South Korean linguist	
Chomsky, Carol	American linguist and education specialist	
Choueiri, Lina	American linguist	
Chowning, Ann	American anthropologist and linguist	
Christensen, Kirsti Koch	Norwegian linguist	
Chuilleanáin, Eiléan Ní	Irish poet and linguist	
Chung, Sandra	American linguist	
Cirlot, Victoria	Spanish philologist	
Clark, Dymphna	Australian linguist	
Clark, Eve V.	American linguist	
Clopper, Cynthia	American linguist	
Cole, Jennifer S.	American linguist	
Condee, Nancy	American philologist of Russian	
Contini-Morava, Ellen	Linguistic anthropologist	
Cornilescu, Alexandra	Romanian syntactician	
Couper-Kuhlen, Elizabeth	American linguist	
Cowper, Elizabeth	Canadian linguist	
Crago, Martha	Canadian linguist	
Cristofaro, Sonia	Typologist and specialist in subordination	
Crowhurst, Megan	Australian-Canadian linguist	
Curzan, Anne	American scholar in English language and literature	

== D ==
- Dąbrowska, Ewa Polish cognitive linguist
- Davies, Anna Morpurgo
- Davis, Jenny L.
- D'Costa, Jean
- de Castro, Yeda Pessoa
- de Guzman, Maria Odulio
- Deloria, Ella Cara
- Denham, Kristin
- Dent, Susie
- de Malkiel, María Rosa Lida
- Demirdache, Hamida French syntactician and semanticist
- Demonte, Violeta Argentinian/Spanish grammarian and syntactician
- Dino, Güzin
- Divjak, Dagmar Corpus linguist and cognitive linguist
- Dobrushina, Nina Russian linguist and Caucasologist
- Dolphyne, Florence Ghanaian linguist
- Dorian, Nancy
- Doron, Edit
- Doron, Helen
- Downing, Laura J.
- Dragićević, Rajna
- Duarte, Dulce Almada
- Dürscheid, Christa
- Dwyer, Arienne

== E ==
- Ebert, Cornelia German semanticist
- Eckert, Penelope
- Ehrlich, Susan
- Eichholz, Vilma Sindona
- É. Kiss, Katalin
- Elgin, Suzette Haden
- Elizarenkova, Tatyana
- Emmorey, Karen
- Engberg-Pedersen, Elisabeth
- Engdahl, Elisabet
- England, Nora
- Epps, Patience
- Ergun, Zeynep
- Erlés, Patricia Esteban
- Ernestus, Mirjam Dutch psycholinguist and laboratory phonologist
- Erofeyeva, Tamara
- Ervin-Tripp, Susan M.
- Escandell-Vidal, Victoria Spanish semanticist and pragmaticist
- Eskildsen, Rosario María Gutiérrez
- Espinal, M. Teresa
- Erzsébet, Barát

== F ==
- Faber, Pamela
- Fanego, Teresa Spanish specialist in historical English syntax
- Farion, Iryna
- Fellbaum, Christiane
- Fielding, Stephanie
- Fierz-David, Linda
- Fiesel, Eva
- Fischer-Jørgensen, Eli
- Fitzgerald, Colleen
- Fjeld, Ruth Vatvedt
- Florey, Margaret
- Fodor, Janet Dean
- Foster, Mary LeCron
- Frazier, Lyn
- Freidenberg, Olga
- Frolova, Olga
- Fromkin, Victoria

== G ==
- Gabain, Annemarie von
- Gabanyi, Anneli Ute
- Gal, Susan
- Gelashvili, Naira
- Genetti, Carol
- Gerdts, Donna
- Gervain, Judit Neurolinguist and prosody specialist
- Gezundhajt, Henriette
- Ghomeshi, Jila
- Giacalone Ramat, Anna Italian historical linguist and acquisitionist
- Gleitman, Lila
- Glisan, Eileen
- Glushkova, Irina
- Goldberg, Adele
- Goldin-Meadow, Susan
- Goodman, Felicitas
- Gopnik, Myrna
- Green, Lisa
- Grenoble, Lenore
- Grigore, Delia
- Groll, Sarah Israelit
- Grønnum, Nina
- Guasti, Maria Teresa Acquisitionist
- Gullberg, Marianne Swedish psycholinguist, gesture specialist
- Gvishiani, Natalia

== H ==
- Haas, Mary
- Haessler, Luise
- Hajičová, Eva
- Hakulinen, Auli
- Hall, Kira
- Hansen, Maj-Britt Mosegaard
- Harley, Heidi
- Harris, Alice
- Harrison, Jane Ellen
- Hasan, Ruqaiya
- Hasdeu, Iulia
- Hasluck, Margaret
- Hatcher, Anna Granville
- Heath, Shirley Brice
- Heim, Irene
- Heller, Monica
- Hellwig, Birgit Descriptive linguist and psycholinguist
- Hercus, Luise
- Hermon, Gabriella
- Herring, Susan
- Hickmann, Maya Developmental psycholinguist
- Hidasi, Judit
- Hildebrandt, Martha
- Hill, Elizabeth
- Hill, Jane H.
- Hinton, Leanne
- Hoff, Erika
- Holmes, Janet
- Holst, Clara
- Holtsmark, Anne
- Hume, Elizabeth V.
- Humphreys, Jennett
- Hyams, Nina

== I ==
- Iatridou, Sabine
- Ibarretxe-Antuñano, Iraide Basque-Spanish cognitive linguist
- Inkelas, Sharon
- Irigaray, Luce
- Itō, Junko
- Ivars, Ann-Marie

== J ==
- Jacobson, Pauline
- Jaszczolt, Katarzyna
- Jeanne, LaVerne
- Jefferson, Gail
- Jelinek, Eloise
- Jensen, Eva Skafte
- Jinfang, Li
- Jisa, Harriet French developmental linguist
- Jobbé-Duval, Brigitte
- Jones, Eliza Grew
- Jun, Sun-Ah

== K ==
- Kachru, Yamuna
- Kahane, Renée
- Kaisse, Ellen
- Kapeliuk, Olga
- Karg-Gasterstädt, Elisabeth
- Karpelès, Suzanne
- Karttunen, Frances
- Keating, Patricia
- Kepping, Ksenia
- Kevelson, Roberta
- Kewley Draskau, Jennifer
- Kidwai, Ayesha Indian theoretical linguist
- Kilham, Hannah
- Kipfer, Barbara Ann
- Kirchmeier, Sabine
- Kirkness, Verna
- Klepfisz, Irena
- Kober, Alice
- Koptjevskaja-Tamm, Maria Typologist and editor-in-chief of Linguistic Typology
- Kordić, Snježana
- Korhonen, Anna Finnish linguist and computer scientist
- Korkmaz, Zeynep
- Kormos, Judit
- Kornfilt, Jaklin
- Kovacs, Agnes Melinda Psycholinguist and cognitive scientist
- Kozhina, Margarita
- Kramer, Christina
- Kratzer, Angelika
- Kropp Dakubu, Mary Esther
- Küntay, Aylin C. Turkish developmental psycholinguist
- Kula, Nancy C.
- Kuteva, Tania Grammaticalization theorist and typologist

== L ==
- Laakso, Johanna
- Lacal de Bracho, Luisa Spanish musicologist and linguist
- Lafkioui, Mena
- Lahiri, Aditi
- Lakoff, Robin
- Lambton, Ann
- Lanehart, Sonja L.
- Larsen-Freeman, Diane
- Lasch, Agathe
- Lastra, Yolanda
- Laughren, Mary
- Legate, Julie Anne
- Lehiste, Ilse
- Levin, Beth
- Lillo-Martin, Diane
- Lippi, Rosina
- Lloyd, Lucy
- Los, Bettelou
- Louw, Cinie Linguist and missionary working on Karanga
- Lucas, Ceil
- Linda Pilliére, a French linguist

== M ==
- Macaulay, Monica
- Majid, Asifa
- Maling, Joan
- Mallinson, Christine American sociolinguist
- Malzahn, Melanie German Indo-Europeanist and Tocharianist
- Manzini, Maria Rita
- Marchello-Nizia, Christiane
- Marika, Raymattja
- Martineau, France
- Martinez, Esther
- Massam, Diane
- Massignon, Geneviève
- Masterman, Margaret
- Matthewson, Lisa Canadian linguist known for work in the syntax and semantics of indigenous languages of the Pacific Northwest
- Mayberry, Rachel
- Mazdapour, Katayun
- McConnell-Ginet, Sally
- McCready, Elin
- McKay, Sandra Lee
- McKean, Erin
- McMahon, April
- McNally, Louise
- Meakins, Felicity
- Meiman-Kitrossky, Inna
- Mendoza-Denton, Norma
- Menn, Lise
- Menyuk, Paula
- Mestergazi, Elena
- Metslang, Helle
- Meyerhoff, Miriam
- Michaelis, Laura
- Michaelis, Susanne Maria
- Mierzejewska, Halina
- Milroy, Lesley
- Mints, Zara
- Mithun, Marianne
- Mohamed, Souad Kassim
- Moliner, María
- Moltmann, Friederike
- Morison, Odille
- Moure, Teresa
- Moyse-Faurie, Claire French linguist, specialist in Oceanic languages
- Munro, Pamela
- Murphy, Lynne
- Muscă, Mona
- Myers-Scotton, Carol

== N ==
- Nábělková, Mira
- Napier, Susan J.
- Napoli, Donna Jo
- Németh T., Enikő Hungarian pragmaticist
- Nemni, Monique
- Nichols, Johanna
- Nielsen, Harriet Bjerrum
- Nikitina, Tatiana
- Nuzhat, Shaista
- Nyati-Ramahobo, Lydia

== O ==
- Okrent, Arika
- Olsen, Birgit Anette
- O'Shea, Natalia
- Ozanne-Rivierre, Françoise
- Özsoy, A. Sumru
- Özyürek, Aslı

== P ==
- Padden, Carol
- Pakendorf, Brigitte South African linguist and biological anthropologist
- Pană Dindelegan, Gabriela Romanian linguist and grammarian
- Partee, Barbara
- Partridge, Monica
- Pätsch, Gertrud
- Pavilionienė, Marija Aušrinė
- Pavlenko, Aneta
- Paducheva, Elena Russian semanticist, syntactician and lexicographer
- Payne, Doris L.
- Peperkamp, Sharon
- Pereltsvaig, Asya
- Perkins, Ellavina
- Perret, Michèle
- Perstølen, Einfrid
- Pierrehumbert, Janet
- Piller, Ingrid
- Pinto-Abecasis, Nina
- Piirainen, Elisabeth
- Poletto, Cecilia Italian syntactician and dialectologist
- Polinsky, Maria
- Poplack, Shana
- Pou, Saveros
- Prince, Ellen
- Proskouriakoff, Tatiana
- Pusch, Luise F.

== Q ==
- Qiriazi, Parashqevi
- Queen, Robin

== R ==
- Rakeei, Fatemeh
- Rakhilina, Ekaterina Russian semanticist and lexical typologist
- Ralli, Angela Morphologist and Greek dialectologist
- Ramchand, Gillian
- Ramírez, Antonia
- Rappaport Hovav, Malka
- Rauch, Irmengard
- Ravid, Dorit
- Reinhart, Tanya
- Reis, Marga German syntactician
- Reutner, Ursula
- Rey-Debove, Josette
- Reynolds, Barbara
- Rialland, Annie
- Rice, Keren
- Rivers, Wilga
- Robert, Stéphane
- Romaine, Suzanne
- Romero, Maribel Spanish semanticist
- Ronat, Mitsou
- Rošker, Jana S.
- Rowlands, Jane Helen

== S ==
- Sabatini, Alma
- Sadiqi, Fatima
- Safavi, Azarmi Dukht
- Sakaguchi, Alicja
- Sakayan, Dora
- Samant, Satvasheela
- Sampson, Hazel
- Sandler, Wendy
- Sankoff, Gillian
- Saubel, Katherine Siva
- Saunders, Irene
- Schafer, Louisa Frederica Adela
- Schieffelin, Bambi
- Schilling, Natalie
- Schmid, Monika German acquisitionist and attrition specialist
- Seki, Lucy
- Selkirk, Elisabeth O.
- Semino, Elena
- Shakryl, Tamara
- Sharma, Devyani
- Sharvit, Yael
- Shaw, Patricia Alice
- Shepard-Kegl, Judy
- Shvedova, Natalia
- Siewierska, Anna
- Simons, Mandy
- Simpson, Jane
- Sims, Andrea
- Širola, Dorjana
- Sjoestedt, Marie-Louise
- Skutnabb-Kangas, Tove
- Smith, Adeline
- Snell-Hornby, Mary
- Soames, Laura
- Sorace, Antonella
- Sornicola, Rosanna
- Sova, Lyubov
- Sovran, Tamar
- Sow, Salamatou
- Srapyan, Hripsime
- Steele, Philippa M. British classicist and linguist
- Steriade, Donca
- Stollznow, Karen
- Stuart-Smith, Jane
- Sullivan, Thelma D.
- Swain, Merrill
- Sweetser, Eve
- Syrett, Kristen

== T ==
- Tagliamonte, Sali
- Tambroni, Clotilde
- Tannen, Deborah
- Tarlinskaja, Marina
- Tarone, Elaine
- Tarpent, Marie-Lucie
- Tenenbaum, Joan M.
- Thomas, M. Carey
- Thomason, Sarah
- Thompson, Sandra
- Thornton, Anna Italian morphologist
- Timm, Erika
- Toby, Ida
- Orlando E. Toledo Morales
- Tracy, Rosemarie
- Traugott, Elizabeth C.
- Turville-Petre, Joan

== U ==
- Ulhicun, Aisin-Gioro
- Uri, Helene

== V ==
- Vainikka, Anna
- Vaissière, Jacqueline
- van Dijk, Marijn
- Vanhove, Martine
- van Kemenade, Ans
- Varlamova, Galina
- Verspoor, Marjolijn
- Vojtko, Margaret Mary

== W ==
- Walden, Tsvia
- Walter, Henriette
- Ward, Ida C.
- Wardale, Edith British philologist of Germanic languages
- Wąsik, Elżbieta Magdalena
- Watahomigie, Lucille
- Wedgwood, Julia
- Wiese, Heike German linguist
- White, Lydia
- Weinstein, Halina
- Wierzbicka, Anna
- Williamson, Kay
- Wodak, Ruth
- Wray, Alison
- Wright, Elizabeth Mary English linguist and dialectologist
- Wurmbrand, Susi

== Y ==
- Yartseva, Viktoria
- Yee, Mary
- Yershova, Galina
- Yip, Moira
- Yip, Virginia
- Young-Scholten, Martha

== Z ==
- Zaenen, Annie
- Zanuttini, Raffaella
- Zassenhaus, Hiltgunt
- Zellou, Georgia
- Zepeda, Ofelia
- Zeshan, Ulrike
- Zhang, Niina Ning
- Žic-Fuchs, Milena
- Zsiga, Elizabeth
- Zubizarreta, M.-L.
- Zuengler, Jane

== See also ==
- List of linguists
- Lists of women
- History of women in linguistics
