= Stephen R. Anderson =

American linguist (1943–2025)

Stephen Robert Anderson (August 3, 1943 – October 13, 2025) was an American linguist. He was the Dorothy R. Diebold Professor of Linguistics at Yale University and was the 2007 president of the Linguistic Society of America.

== Life and career ==
Anderson was born in Madison, Wisconsin, on August 3, 1943. He received a B.S. in Linguistics from the Illinois Institute of Technology in 1966 and a Ph.D. in Linguistics from the Massachusetts Institute of Technology in 1969. Anderson taught at Harvard University from 1969 until 1975. He joined the faculty of the University of California, Los Angeles, in 1975. In 1988, he became a professor of cognitive science at Johns Hopkins University. He joined the faculty at Yale University in 1994, where he remained until his retirement in 2017. He was a Guggenheim Fellow in 1988–89. Anderson was elected a Fellow of the American Association for the Advancement of Science in 1993, the American Academy of Arts and Sciences in 1999, the Association for Psychological Science in 2006, and the Linguistic Society of America in 2008. He was an early member of Project Steve. From 2009 to 2013 he was Vice President of CIPL, the Permanent International Committee of Linguists. In January, 2014, he was awarded the Victoria A. Fromkin Lifetime Service Award of Linguistic Society of America. A festschrift in his honor on his retirement was edited in 2017 by Claire Bowern, Laurence Horn and Raffaella Zanuttini.

Anderson died on October 13, 2025, at his home in Asheville, North Carolina.

== Selected publications ==
- Anderson, Stephen R. (1992). A-Morphous Morphology. Cambridge: Cambridge University Press. doi:10.1017/CBO9780511586262. ISBN 9780511586262.
- Anderson, Stephen R. (2004). Doctor Dolittle's delusion: animals and the uniqueness of human language. New Haven: Yale University Press. ISBN 9780300115253.
- Anderson, Stephen R.; de Saussure, Louis (2018). René de Saussure and the theory of word formation. Berlin, Germany: Language Science Press. doi:10.5281/zenodo.1306472. ISBN 9783-96110-096-5.
- Anderson, Stephen R. (2021). Phonology in the twentieth century (Second, revised and expanded ed.). Berlin: Language Science Press. doi:10.5281/zenodo.5509618. ISBN 978-3-96110-327-0. ISSN 2629-172X.
