= Syrett =

Syrett is an English surname. Notable people with the surname include:

- Anne Syrett Green (1858–1936), Australian welfare worker and evangelist
- Charles Syrett Farrell Easmon (1946–2025), British microbiologist and medical professor
- Dave Syrett (1956–2016), English footballer
- David Syrett (1939–2004), American historian
- Harold Syrett (1913–1984), American historian
- Kristen Syrett, American linguist
- Netta Syrett (1865–1943), English writer
- Ron Syrett (1931–2018), English rugby player
