= Miyares (surname) =

Miyares is a surname. Notable people with the surname include:

- Eloína Miyares Bermúdez (1928–2015), Cuban linguist and academic
- Fernando Miyares y Gonzáles, Cuban captain general
- Jason Miyares (born 1976), American politician and Attorney General of Virginia
- Javier Miyares, Cuban-American academic administrator
- Marcelino Miyares Sotolongo, Cuban-American marketing executive and politician
