= History of women in linguistics =

While women have made considerable contributions to linguistics before it became an independent academic discipline, these early achievements have often fallen into oblivion. Their work has been lost or become untraceable and their authorship has been challenged. They have not been given recognition when collaborating with male scholars, or had to publish anonymously due to gender bias. While, at times, their contributions were left unpublished, the passing of time in other instances erased the memory of what they did publish. Moreover, in case the memory of these women has stood the test of time, it is often their academic, and particularly linguistic, achievements that do not live on.

Meanwhile, those female linguistic contributions that have not fully slipped into obscurity should be regarded separately from a more general history of linguistics, so as not to measure their significance against male achievements. Additionally, the historical field of female linguistics should be demarcated with careful consideration of the intricate historical context in which women's linguistic achievements are couched, such as limited education opportunities or restriction to the private sphere. Consequently, it should include contributions outside of formal, institutionalised, and public structures, such as language teaching, translating, and even supporting male colleagues, alongside more traditional input, such as the publication of dictionaries and grammars, or engagement in language debates. Nonetheless, because the linguistic field has overall become more accepting towards women, female achievements have also increasingly aligned with the traditional idea of linguistics over time.

== Aspasia (ca. 470 – 401 BCE) ==
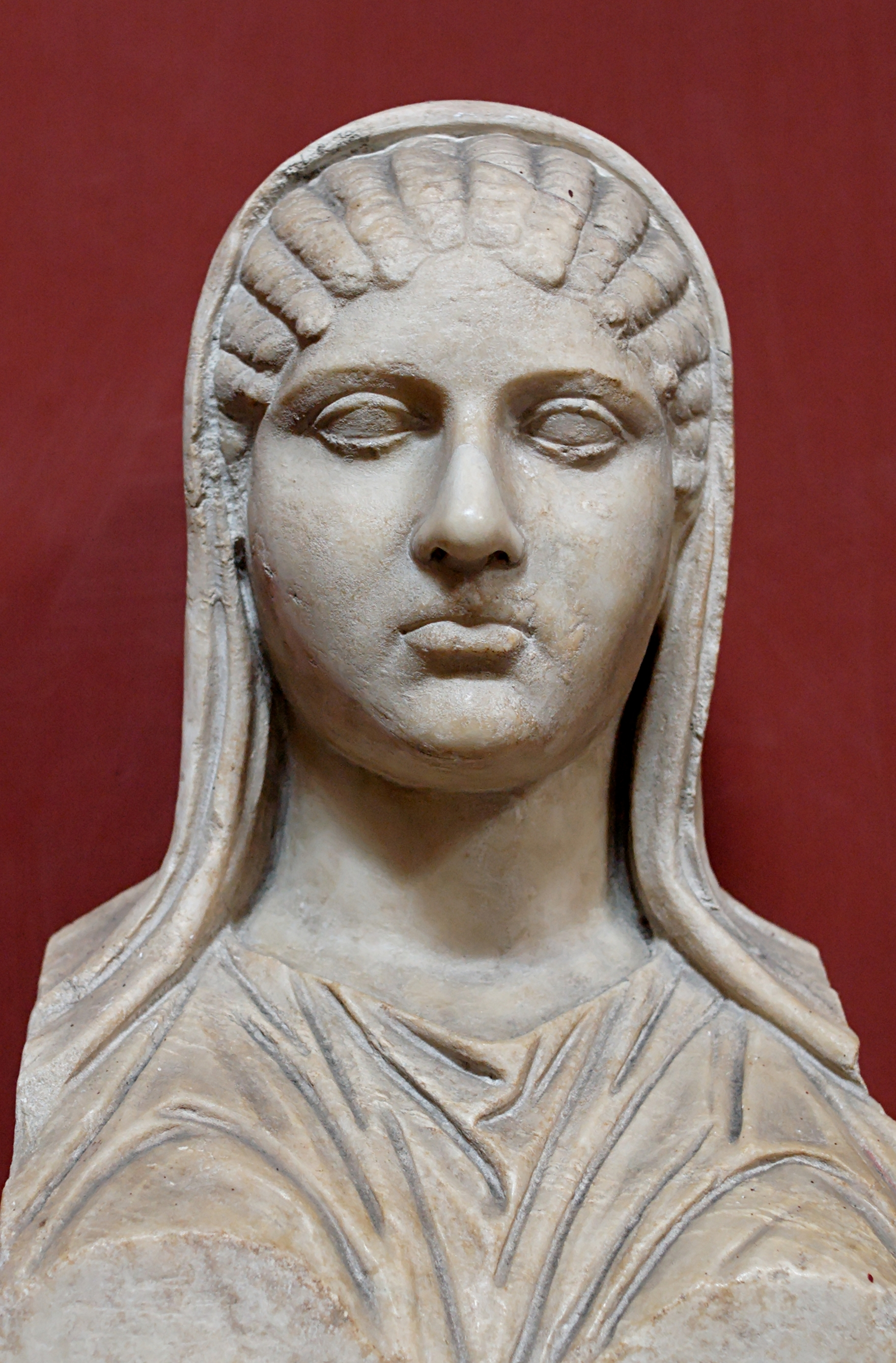
Marble portrait herm identified as Aspasia

Aspasia was an Athenian woman who started out as a hetaira, but later married Pericles, Athen's political leader at the time. Though she lived in Athens, being foreign-born granted her more freedom than other women, which allowed her to distinguish herself in Sophist circles as a great rhetorician and to engage her rhetorical skills in political life. These actions not only held considerable linguistic significance but even gained her the titles of 'poetess' and 'mistress of eloquence'. Moreover, Aspasia was also associated with Plato's Academy and one of the only two women described as a philosopher in his dialogues. Plato himself considered her a poster child of the deceitful use of Sophistic rhetoric, which he was exceptionally critical of. Furthermore, his Menexus mentions that she wrote a funeral speech delivered by Pericles, and cites her as Socrates', as well as many other Athenians', teacher in rhetoric, which also ranks among her linguistic achievements. Nevertheless, the idea that she instructed Socrates in rhetoric cannot count on much support anymore in the 21st century. Conversely, Plutarch's account, which mentions that Socrates sporadically visited her with his pupils and that even his close friends allowed their wives to listen to her, is considered more plausible.

== Hypatia (ca. 355 – ca. 415 CE) ==
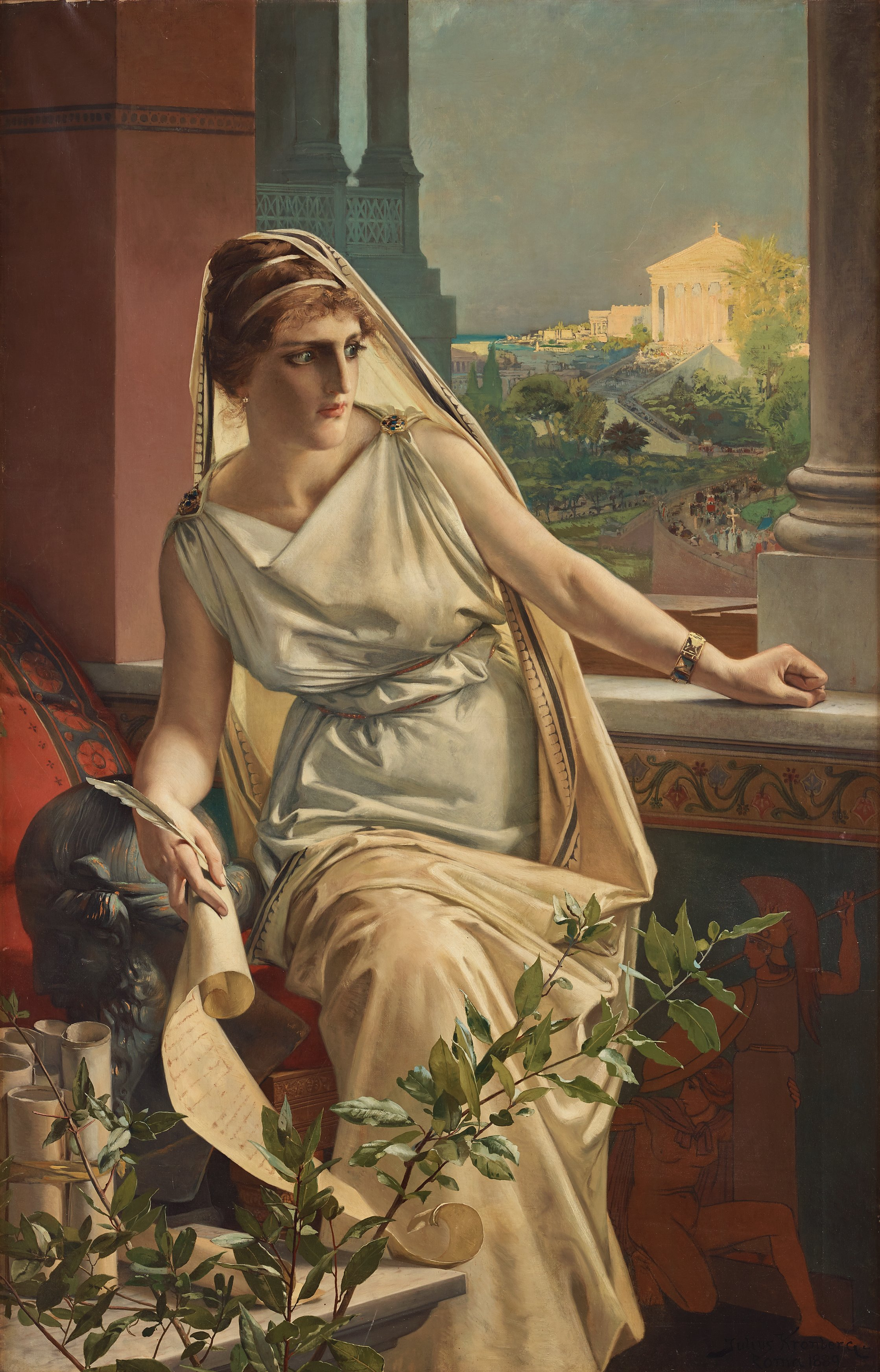
Portrait of Hypatia

Hypatia of Alexandria, like other philosophers in the early centuries of the Empire, played an active role in the public life of Alexandria and became a prominent celebrity as a result. She succeeded her father as leader of the Academy, the most renowned philosophical school at that time. Given her position, she must have been well-versed in foundational ancient philosophical texts on linguistics and logic, like those by Aristotle or Plato, and their corresponding commentaries. Among the readings of the Neoplatonist curriculum, for instance, was Plato's Cratylus, a testimony to the importance held by linguistic topics in the philosophic framework of late antiquity. Additionally, Hypatia was also a private and public teacher of geometry, mathematics, and philosophy. According to Socrates of Constantinople she taught all who wanted to hear, not just exclusive groups of initiates. He also mentions how her knowledge awarded her with a certain freedom of speech and with the liberty to treat men as her equals.

== Ban Zhao (44-116 CE) ==
Ban Zhao was the daughter of Ban Biao and sister of Ban Gu, both historians during the Han dynasty. Whereas women did not have substantial influence over Chinese philology during this period, Ban Zhao is an exception. After her brother's execution, she secured her place in the male bastion of scholastic transmission by completing her father and brother's composition of the Book of Han by order of Emperor He. She also allegedly annotated a critical edition (now lost) of Liu Xiang's Biographies of Eminent Women. The linguistic character of this work lies in the fact that it contributes to the field of glossography, a prominent aspect of Chinese philology.

Moreover, she wrote what is considered to be the earliest female metarhetorical work, entitled Admonitions for Women/Lessons for Women. Because its preface reveals the intended audience to be the young women in Ban Zhao's family, this text is also regarded as the earliest work exclusively designed to meet the needs of Chinese women's education. It served as inspiration for later female textbooks and was integrated in the Four Books for Women as well. In terms of its content, while the text intends to instruct women in respectable female behaviour and wifely submission, it also includes the earliest known argument for female literacy. In this way, Ban Zhao could successfully plead in favour of women's literacy without offending her male, more conservative readership. Besides her publications, Ban Zhao also presided over the schooling of Empress Deng and her court ladies during the reign of Emperor He, and afterwards during Empress Dowager Deng's own reign.

== Aisha bint Abi Bakr (613/14-678 CE) ==
Aisha bint Abi Bakr is known as the favourite wife of Muhammad, the Prophet, and the daughter of Abu Bakr. Her linguistic importance is rooted in her impact on the stabilisation and codification of the Arabic language. Many Arabic linguistic contributions are linked to the Qur'an because they aim for a more accurate and authentic understanding of this sacred text. Consequently, as many believe to find an addition to this Qur'an in the Hadith, Aisha's prominent transmission of Hadith holds linguistic importance as well. Her understanding of medicine, astronomy, and, most importantly, poetry enabled her to formulate expressions with a certain subtlety, and her thorough knowledge of Arabic grammar shines through in her transmissions. Aisha's prestige lead others to embrace her phraseology and made her a great influence on the codification of Arabic. In this regard, her discourse can be considered a linguistic achievement in itself.

Additionally, Aisha contributed to the codification of the Islamic legal language of Fiqh, because it builds upon that of Hadith. Besides, she issued fatwas during the caliphates of Umar and Uthman and held discussions with Companions of the Prophet about the correct way of formulating these judgements, which stimulated the adoption of an accurate grammar and vocabulary. Lastly, she is also valuable to the field of linguistics because she taught Arabic to her nephew Urwa ibn al-Zubayr, as well as to other prominent male jurists.

== Paula Vicente (1519-1576 CE) ==
Paula Vicente can be considered a linguist because of the grammar she wrote, entitled Arte da língua inglesa, e olandeza para instruçaõ dos seus naturaes (The Art of the English and Dutch Language for the Instruction of its Natives). She was also reportedly proficient in multiple languages and was a member of Maria of Portugal's renowned circle, which partook in literary sessions and held a unique cultural importance. Furthermore, because she was the daughter of Gil Vicente, Queen D. Catarina de Áustria gave her permission to both print and sell his collected works. Nonetheless, because of the lack of information about the grammar and several other works ascribed to her, some researchers believe these attributions to be part of a myth created around the figure of Paula Vicente.

== Marie Le Jars de Gournay (1565-1645 CE) ==
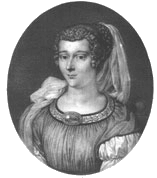
Lithography of Marie le Jars de Gournay

Marie Le Jars de Gournay, fille d'alliance (adopted daughter) of Michel de Montaigne and editor of his Essais (Essays), is best known for her feminist works. She took part in the Querelle des femmes by writing her Egalité des hommes et des femmes (The Equality of Men and Women), published in 1622. Besides feminist texts, her collected works also include essays concerning the French language. On top of that, de Gournay can also be considered a pioneering female linguist because she is the earliest known woman who wrote a French metalinguistic work. Her critical perspective on the French language was probably incited by her work as an editor, translator, as well as writer of novels and poetry. Moreover, even in her linguistic writings her feminist convictions shine through.

She was a defender of the language usage and poetic style of the Pléiade poets, Ronsard in particular, and supported their use of archaisms, neologisms, diminutives, and metaphors. She also believed that the language of poetry should not be restricted by rules, and heavily criticised François de Malherbe's new school which regulated language by rejecting words considered too archaic, too new, or too lowly. Additionally, even though she strongly advocated for the equality between men and women, in her Deffence de la poësie et du langage des poëtes (Defence of Poetry and the Language of the Poets) she still disapproved of those who insincerely praised and flattered women by terming them the arbiters of good language usage.

Furthermore, women in the French tradition had more influence on the linguistic debate through their work as translators, which was at the time considered a sort of applied grammar. De Gournay's partial translations of Virgil's Aeneid, published in 1626, in particular, are a great representation of the association between these two disciplines. Her translation of the second book includes passages from Jean Bertaut's version as comparisons and her translation of book four is actually a completion of the one started by Jacques Davy Duperron. De Gournay's 1626 essay De la façon d'escrire de Messieurs l'Eminentissime Cardinal Du Perron et Bertaut Illustrissime Evesque de Sées (On the Writing Style of the Most Eminent Cardinal Du Perron and the Most Illustrious Bishop Bertaut of Sées) also presents these men as late supporters of the Pléiade, whose language was characterised by Pléiade-like language features, such as diminutives and ablative absolutes. Besides, de Gournay's gender politics even permeate her translations. She underscored Dido's royal status and power by regularly referring to her with a royal title where the original Latin does not do so, and occasionally expanded the text to elaborate on Dido's romance, tragedy, and nobility.

== Anna Maria van Schurman (1607–1678 CE) ==
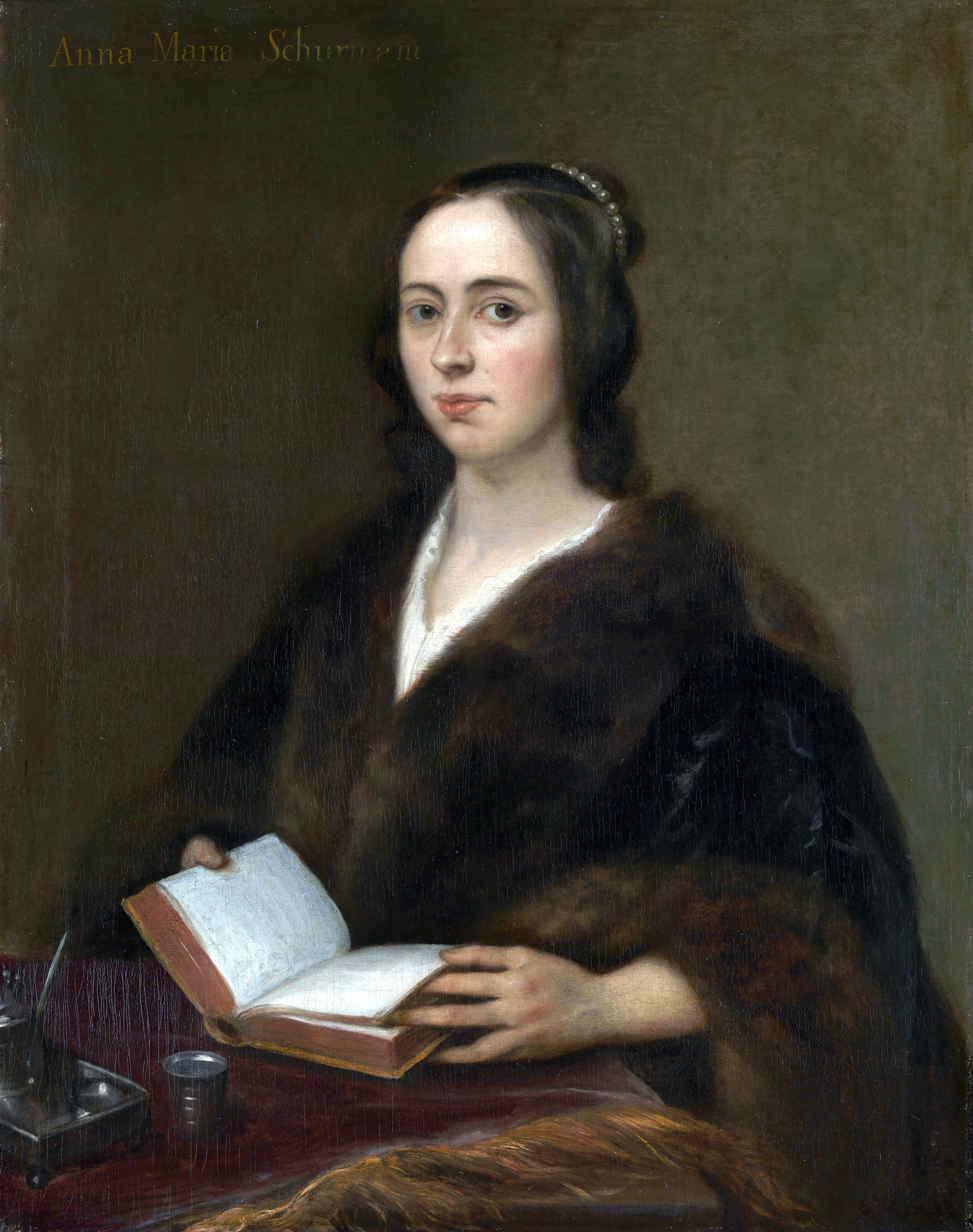
Portrait of Anna Maria van Schurman

Anna Maria van Schurman was a German-born woman of noble birth who received an excellent education. She mastered Latin, Greek, and Hebrew and by corresponding in these languages she contributed to international scholarly communication. Furthermore, the publication of her 1641 Dissertatio de ingenii muliebris ad doctrinam et meliores litteras aptitudine (A Treatise on the Aptitude of the Female Spirit for Science and Arts) resulted in her acceptance into the University of Utrecht, making her the first female university student in the Netherlands. Integral to her accomplishments was the mentorship of the men in her life. Her father taught her Latin and Greek, and she was further supported by her brother Johan Godschalk as well as Jacob Cats and André Rivet. Most indispensable to her linguistic achievements, however, was Gisbertus Voetius, Professor of Oriental Languages in Utrecht. In addition to privately tutoring her in Greek, he also made his vast library available to her studies and research.

Van Schurman made a significant contribution to the linguistic field by writing a grammar of Ethiopian. Her study of this Semitic language was motivated by her general interest in languages as well as her desire to better understand the Bible. At the time of her studies, however, resources for learning the language were limited. Victorinus' 1548 edition of the New Testament, for example, included a nonsensical Ethiopian grammar, while Jacobus Wemmers' 1638 dictionary of Ethiopian was a rather limited one. Moreover, Voetius' library was not sufficiently stocked with Ethiopian sources either.

Because of this lack of available Ethiopian grammars, van Schurman decided to compose one in Latin herself, which she finished in 1648 but never published. The work certainly included a section called 'De Lectione' ('On Pronunciation'), as well as one entitled 'De Nomine' ('About the Nouns'). Because these segments only cover part of the grammar, it is assumed that they do not represent the work in its entirety. However, this cannot be verified, as the grammar itself has been lost. Consequently, it also remains unresolved how much of her work was incorporated in Job Ludolf's 1661 grammar of Ethiopian. Nevertheless, it is certain that he heard about van Schurman's Ethiopian studies at the outset of his research and, in turn, visited her to examine all materials she possessed. In this regard, van Schurman can be considered the mother of Ethiopian studies as well as a pioneer of non-western language studies.

== Johanna Corleva (1698-1752 CE) ==
Johanna Corleva attached great importance to the cultivation of the Dutch language, its correct usage, and its codification. Her efforts contributed to a wider movement that paved the way for the official codification of Dutch in the 19th century. She wrote her Nieuwe Nederduitsche spraakkonst (New Dutch Grammar), a Dutch rhyming dictionary, and a Dutch translation of Pierre Bayle's philosophical works. Moreover, in 1740, Corleva also composed her Algemeene en geredeneerde spraakkonst, a Dutch translation of the second edition of Antoine Arnauld and Claude Lancelot's Grammaire générale et raisonnée (General and Rational Grammar). This translation at times adheres slightly too much to the French original, resulting in minor lapses in the Dutch version. Additionally, conforming to puristic tendencies, the work exclusively uses Dutch equivalents for Latin grammatical terms.

Later, in 1741, she published her dictionary De schat der Nederduitsche wortel-woorden or Le Trésor des mots originaux, de la langue Flamande (The Treasure of Dutch Root Words). The work encompasses two sections of which one could be regarded as the main dictionary, dedicated to the root words, their derivations, and compounds, while the additional part presents once more these root words, but separately. It was influenced by other lexicographical works, such as François Halma's Woordenboek der Nederduitsche en Fransche taalen (Dictionary of the Dutch and French Languages) and Cornelius Schrevelius' Lexicon manuale Graeco Latinum et Latino-Graecum (Concise Greek–Latin and Latin–Greek Dictionary). While the former served as the foundation for Corleva's nomenclature, the latter supplied her with the idea that the Dutch language could be learned entirely with only a modest number of words and without using loanwords.

== Émilie Du Châtelet (1706-1749 CE) ==
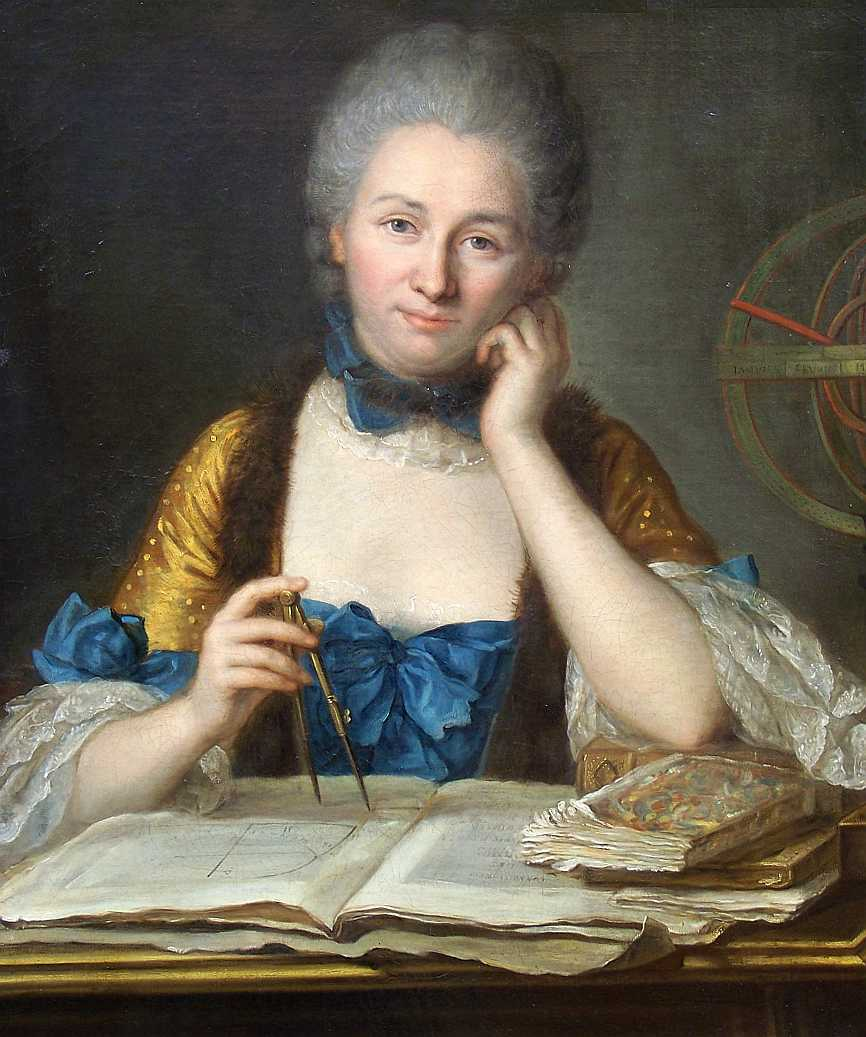
Portrait of Émilie Du Châtelet

Émilie du Châtelet is well known for her liaison with Voltaire as well as for her scientific work and translations. Nonetheless, she is also the best known 18th-century female grammarian and one of the only two women featured in the Corpus of Fundamental Linguistic Texts because of her Grammaire raisonnée (Rational Grammar). This work was composed somewhere between 1736 and 1749, but regrettably, as Du Châtelet never published it, most of it has been lost. Only three chapters have survived, all put together resulting in around 90 pages: chapter six ('Des mots en général considérés selon leur signification grammaticale'), chapter seven ('Des mots qui représentent les objets de nos perceptions'), and chapter eight ('Des mots qui désignent les opérations de notre entendement sur les objets'). Additionally, the lost second chapter supposedly addressed the operations of the mind on objects ('Opérations de notre âme sur les objets').

Overall, Du Châtelet's grammar conforms to prevalent linguistic notions of her time. It belongs to the tradition of French grammars established by the Grammaire générale et raisonnée (General and Rational Grammar) published in 1660 by Antoine Arnauld and Claude Lancelot, and is also especially influenced by Claude Buffier's 1709 grammar. The latter functioned as Du Châtelet's source on comprehensive language-usage observations, and the former supplied the general structure and composition of her grammar. Another one of her inspirations was Vaugelas. Nevertheless, she did not blindly take her predecessors as gospel, but at times criticised their theoretical perspectives as well. Additionally, Du Châtelet provided her grammar with her own comments, examples, and amusing remarks, which not only grant the work an enjoyable conversational tone, but also showcase her knowledge of the French language.

Moreover, Du Châtelet's translations reflect a metalinguistic influence as well. Two of her translations stood the test of time, i.e. Bernard Mandeville's The Fable of the Bees and Newton's Philosophiæ Naturalis Principia Mathematica (Mathematical Principles of Natural Philosophy). The former was not solely intended as a translation, but was also meant to demonstrate that French could be effectively used as a scientific language. This complies with Voltaire's idea that French was more suitable to distribute new scientific knowledge than Latin, because it was equipped with essential modern expressions. Furthermore, whenever French lacked the term for a new concept, Du Châtelet devised a fitting neologism instead.

== Francisca de Chantal Álvares (1742- post 1800 CE) ==
Francisca de Chantal Álvares, also known as Ana Inácia do Coração de Jesus, was the sister of Manuel Álvares and a novice of the Order of the Visitation of Holy Mary, a religious institution that played an important role in female education. Her importance as a linguist lies in the fact that she authored the first female Portuguese grammar dedicated to an exclusively female audience in 1786, entitled Breve compendio da grammatica portugueza para uso das meninas que se educaõ no Mosteiro da Vizitaçaõ de Lisboa (Brief Compendium of the Portuguese Grammar for the Use of Girls, Who Are Educated in the Visitation Monastery of Lisbon).

The work was meant for use as a Visitande school manual and should be regarded as a semi-anonymous work. While the titlepage only alludes to a female author with the inscription: 'Por huma religioza do mesmo mosteiro' ('By a nun of the same monastery'), which is followed by the abbreviation 'F. C.', excerpts from the Historia da Fundação do Mosteiro da Vizitação em Lisboa (History of the Foundation of the Visitation Monastery in Lisbon) prove that this abbreviation refers to Francisca de Chantal Álvares. As earlier Portuguese grammars were solely geared towards a male audience, Álvares' work constituted the first Portuguese Grammaire des dames (Grammar Book for Ladies) and with it the foundation of female grammaticography in Portuguese. The female school setting of Álvares' work, then, is also reflected in her example sentences, which feature more women than those in other grammars, and these women are exclusively portrayed as involved in school activities.

One of Álvares' grammatical sources was Lobato's 1770 Arte da Grammatica da Lingua Portuguesa (The Art of Portuguese Grammar), the first Portuguese grammar officially adopted by the male public school system. Like Lobato, the Breve compendio shows that in 18th-century Portugal learning the mother tongue was of great importance, as it supplied a foundation for learning other languages. Knowledge of French, in particular, was regarded as crucial, because it was a prestigious language that granted the Portuguese access to a broader European culture, including literature, fashion, and arts. The concise Breve compendio, then, with its 58 pages, does not aim to cover all of Portuguese grammar, but instead offers a brief outline of what is most relevant in order to prepare students for foreign language learning. While, because of the prominence of modern languages, Latin was no longer considered the main cornerstone of language teaching for the Visitandines, Álvares still adopted the Latin grammar tradition by emphasising syntax and morphology, but deprioritising orthography and prosody. Nonetheless, the order in which she discussed these four traditional parts was rather unconventional.

== Yekaterina Vorontsova-Dashkova (1743-1810 CE) ==
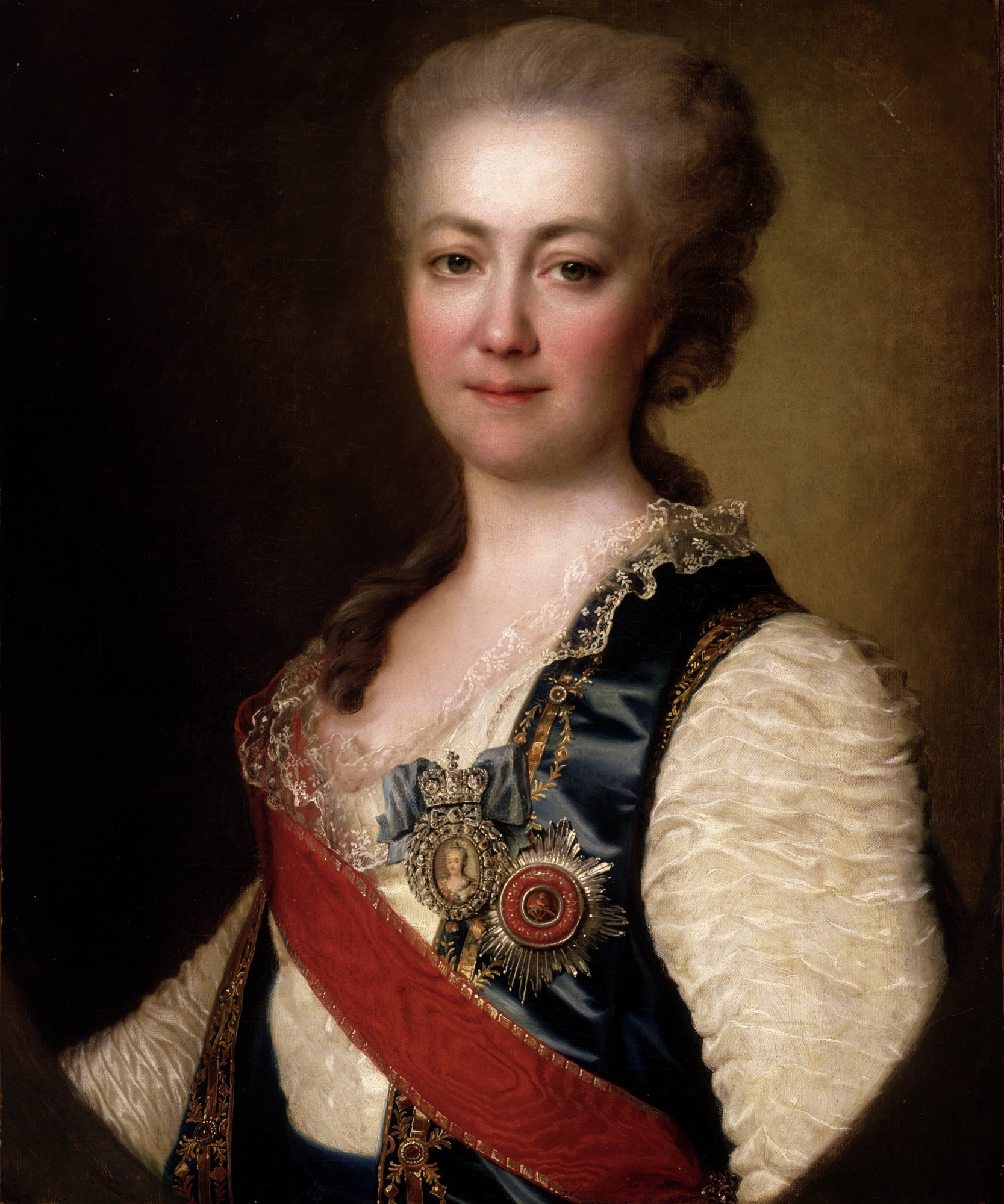
Portrait of Yekaterina Vorontsova-Dashkova

According to Princess Dashkova's own memoirs, she was, together with Catherine the Great, responsible for the creation of the Imperial Russian Academy. The Empress appointed her President of this Academy, so that she could engage her lexicographical expertise in the normalisation project of the Russian language. In 1783, in light of the Academy's organisation, Dashkova also founded and edited the journal Sobesednik liubitelei rossiiskago slova (The Collocutor of the Lovers of the Russian Word). She envisioned it as a virtual salon that would bring together contemporary writings and imitations of foreign texts as well as linguistic and lexicographical works, such as reflections on code-switching or lexical borrowing. Dashkova herself also contributed articles to the journal.

Among Dashkova's linguistic achievements is also the production of the Slovar' Akademii Rossiyskoy v shesti chastyakh (Dictionary of the Russian Academy in six parts), started in 1783. It was to support the Academy's aim of refining and enriching the Russian language and was modelled largely on the 1694 Dictionary of the French Academy. As the first Russian explanatory dictionary it played a role in the development of the language and can be regarded as the foundation of its modern standard. The work was not structured solely alphabetically in the traditional sense but also partially according to lexemes, adding a grammatical component. For the creation of this genre of dictionary, then, the Academy divided the undertaking into three separate sections: a grammatical, definitional, and editorial one. Dashkova took charge of the definition department.

== Early Modern American women as cross-cultural translators ==
In Early Modern America women primarily contributed to linguistics through their role as transcultural and translingual translators. As women were authorised to transfer between cultures and languages, they played a key role in the dialogue and interaction between indigenous societies on the one hand and European migrant populations on the other.

=== Malinalli (ca. 1496-1529 CE) ===
An early case was Malinalli, or la Malinche, a Nahua woman of noble birth, who spoke Nahuatl, Spanish, and Maya. As a child she was either sold or sent to different Mayan-speaking communities, but ultimately gifted to Hernán Cortés and his Spanish conquerors. For them, she served as a linguistic interpreter and translator and she even played a role in averting the trap against the Spanish set up by the Cholulan people.

=== Pocahontas (ca. 1595–1617 CE) ===
Similarly, Pocahontas, or Amonute, was a Powhatan noble who lived in Tidewater Virginia, when she was captured by English immigrants trying to establish a settlement at Jamestown. In captivity she took on the name 'Rebecca', converted to Christianity, and married John Rolfe, an Englishman with whom she later had a son, Thomas Rolfe. While the extent of her intermediary function between the Powhatan people and English speakers is unclear, her communication between the two cultures has been documented in various records.

=== Sacajawea (1788–ca. 1812 CE) ===
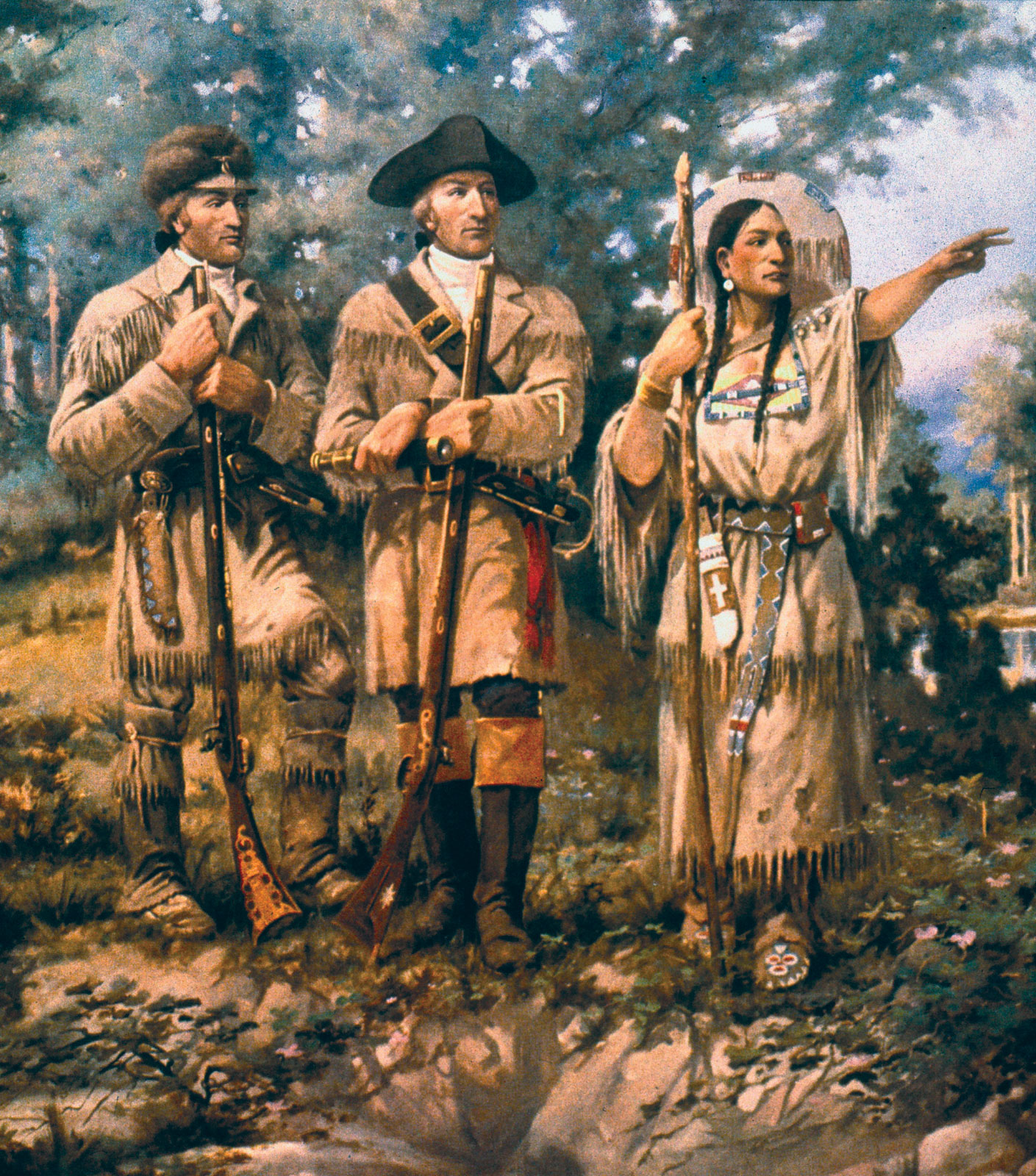
Mural of Sacajawea with Lewis and Clark

Another example of female cross-cultural translation is Sacajawea. She was a Shoshoni woman who knew both Shoshoni and Hidatsa because she had been kidnapped by the Hidatsa community as a child. At a young age, she, among other indigenous girls, had been taken into marriage by the French-Canadian fur trader Charbonneau. When he joined Meriwether Lewis and William Clark's Corps of Discovery expedition, she travelled with them as well. On this mission to discover the region northwest of the Mississippi River, Sacajawea's command of languages proved crucial and her identity as a native woman helped bypass the distrust of the communities Lewis and Clark encountered.

=== Rebecca Kellogg (1695-1757 CE) ===
Another, lesser-known, source of transcultural communication were female European children who were kidnapped by Native Americans and raised as adoptees. Rebecca Kellogg, for instance, was kidnapped in the Deerfield raid of 1708 and adopted into a Mohawk family at eight years old. She integrated into their culture and took on the name 'Wausania', but never lost her proficiency in English. She later married a white man and supported his work on behalf of white missionaries by translating between Mohawk and English. Because of the respect bestowed upon her by both the settler and Native American communities, Kellogg was able to hold a mediating position and facilitate communication between both groups. She only ended her linguistic mediation at the outbreak of the French and Indian War in 1756.

== See also ==
- History of linguistics
- List of women linguists
