= Brita Bergman =

Swedish linguist and sign language specialist

Brita Elisabeth Bergman (b. Jonsson, 30 March 1946) is a Swedish emeritus professor specializing in the linguistics of signed languages. She initiated a line of research in signed language linguistics at the Department of Linguistics at Stockholm University that is still being carried out to this day.

== Biography and research ==
In 1971, Bergman wrote a term paper on a form of signed communication, Signed Swedish, encouraged by Professor Bengt Sigurd. Subsequently, she worked on sign language as part of the project The Linguistic Status of Sign Language.

In 1972 she took a course on sign language. After the course, she was surprised to find that she could not understand what deaf people were signing, and that she had difficulty making herself understood. This turned out to be because she had learned a manually coded language rather than a true sign language. She soon discovered that true sign languages are full-fledged natural languages.

Bergman published the report Tecknad svenska (Signed Swedish) in 1977 as part of the National Swedish Board of Education's report series (no. 28); an English version was published in 1979. The report provided in-depth discussion of the structure of signs and the use of (spoken) Swedish grammar with signs, among other things. Early in her research, she came to the conclusion that Swedish Sign Language was the only language acquired by the deaf community outside of formal education, that is, that it must be considered the mother tongue of the deaf community.

In 1991, Bergman was appointed Professor of Sign Language at Stockholm University, the world's first professorship in sign language research.

Together with Lars Kruth, Bergman is often credited with the recognition of Swedish Sign Language as a national language of Sweden. In 1992 she was awarded the Lars Kruth Medal for her efforts in sign language research and advocacy on behalf of the deaf community. Her research was a decisive factor in the Riksdag's decision of 14 May 1981 to recognize Swedish Sign Language as a national minority language.

== Honours and awards ==
- 2006: elected member of the Royal Swedish Academy of Letters, History and Antiquities
- 2011: awarded H. M. The King's Medal (8th size, Order of the Seraphim ribbon) for significant contributions within the field of sign language research
- 2013: elected member of the Academia Europaea
- 2015: awarded International Solidarity Merit Award Second Class by the World Federation of the Deaf

== Selected publications ==
- Bergman, Brita. 1979 (1977). Signed Swedish (Tecknad svenska). Stockholm: National Swedish Board of Education.
- Bergman, Brita. 1983. Verbs and adjectives: Morphological processes in Swedish Sign Language. In James Kyle and Bencie Woll (eds.), Language in sign, 3--9. London: Croom Helm.
- Bergman, Brita and Östen Dahl. 1994. Ideophones in Sign Language? The place of reduplication in the tense-aspect system of Swedish Sign Language. In Carl Bache, Hans Basbøll and Carl-Erik Lindberg (eds.), Tense, Aspect and Action, 397–422. Berlin: Mouton de Gruyter.
- Crasborn, Onno A., Johanna Mesch, Dafydd Waters, Annika Nonhebel, Els van der Kooij, Bencie Woll and Brita Bergman. 2007. Sharing sign language data online: Experiences from the ECHO project. International Journal of Corpus Linguistics 12 (4), 535–562.
- Liddell, Scott K., Marit Vogt-Svendsen and Brita Bergman. 2007. A crosslinguistic comparison of buoys: evidence from American, Norwegian, and Swedish Sign Language. In Myriam Vermeerbergen, Lorraine Leeson and Onno A. Crasborn (eds.), Simultaneity in signed languages: form and function, 187–215. Amsterdam: John Benjamins.
