= Marie-José Béguelin =

Swiss linguist

Marie-José Béguelin (born 1949) is a Swiss linguist specializing in the Romance languages.

== Biography ==
Béguelin was born in Delémont, Switzerland, on July 21, 1949. Her father was the politician, writer and journalist Roland Béguelin. After primary and secondary school in Delémont from 1956 to 1965, she studied for her Matura at the Cantonal School of Porrentruy, specializing in classical languages (Latin and Greek). She then studied in Paris, obtaining a degree in classical philology from the Sorbonne (Paris IV) and a certificate in classical Indology from Paris III in 1972. After further study and a time spent teaching Latin in Milan, she moved to Geneva in 1976 to study general linguistics at the University of Geneva. Her doctorate was awarded there in 1984 for a thesis on comparative Indo-European linguistics, specifically the morphology of Latin nouns.

Béguelin has spent her career at universities in French-speaking Switzerland. From 1979 to 1982 she taught historical linguistics at the University of Lausanne. Between 1983 and 2001 she worked at the University of Fribourg, initially as a lecturer, then as associate professor. In 1990 she was appointed extraordinary professor at the University of Neuchâtel, where she became ordinary professor in 2001.

== Honours and awards ==
Béguelin has been the recipient of numerous honours and awards. Her doctoral thesis received the prestigious Charles Bally Prize in 1985. Between 1999 and 2003 she was the holder of the Joseph Houziaux Prize for study of the French language and its dialects, awarded by the Royal Academy of Science, Letters and Fine Arts of Belgium. She has been a member of the Jurassian Institute of Science, Letters and Arts since 2003, of the Royal Academy of French Language and Literature of Belgium since 2008, and of the Academia Europaea since 2012. In 2008 she was appointed Knight of the Ordre des Palmes académiques of France.

== Research ==
Béguelin's academic work has ranged widely across comparative Indo-European linguistics, French linguistics and varieties of French, syntax, anaphora, discourse, language policy, and epistemology of the language sciences.

== Selected publications ==
- Reichler-Béguelin, Marie-José. 1988. Anaphore, cataphore, er mémoire discursive (Anaphora, cataphora and discursive memory). Pratiques 57, 15–43. doi:10.3406/prati.1988.1470
- Berrendonner, Alain, and Marie-José Reichler-Béguelin. 1989. Décalages: les niveaux de l'analyse linguistique (Gaps: levels of linguistic analysis). Langue Française 81, 99–125.
- Apothéloz, Deniz, and Marie-José Reichler-Béguelin. 1995. Construction de la référence et stratégies de désignation (Construction of reference and strategies of designation). TRANEL. Travaux Neuchâtelois de Linguistique 23, 227–271.
- Béguelin, Marie-José. 1998. Le rapport écrit-oral: tendances dissimilatrices, tendances assimilatrices (The relation between writing and speech: dissimilatory and assimilatory tendencies). Cahiers de Linguistique Française 20, 229–253.
- Béguelin, Marie-José and Gilles Corminboeuf. 2005. De la question à l’hypothèse: aspects d'un phénomène de coalescence (From question to hypothesis: aspects of a phenomenon of coalescence). In Corinne Rossari, Anne Beaulieu-Masson, Corina Cojocariu and Anna Razgouliaeva (eds.), Les états de la question (The states of the question), 67–89. Québec: Les Éditions Nota Bene. ISBN 9782895182160
- Béguelin, Marie-José, Mathieu Avanzi and Gilles Corminboeuf (eds.). 2010. La Parataxe (Parataxis), vol. 1: Entre dépendance et intégration (Between dependence and integration). Bern: Peter Lang. ISBN 9783035200256
- Béguelin, Marie-José. 2010. Noyaux prédicatifs juxtaposés (Juxtaposed predicative nuclei). In Béguelin, Avanzi & Corminboeuf (eds.), La Parataxe, 3–33.
- Stähli, Adrian, Christa Dürscheid and Marie-José Béguelin. 2011. sms4science: Korpusdaten, Literaturüberblick und Forschungsfragen (sms4science: corpus data, literature review and research questions). Linguistik Online 48 (4), 3–18. doi:10.13092/lo.48.330
