= Satvasheela Samant =

Indian linguist (1945–2013)

Satvasheela Samant (née Satvasheela Parshuram Desai; 25 March 1945 – 1 May 2013) was an Indian linguist who compiled Sabdananda, a 3-language dictionary in English, Marathi and Hindi. She campaigned to reintroduce old-style Devanagari script for the Marathi language.

She got a bachelor's degree (B.A.) with Sanskrit and Marathi language. After completing LLB she gained master's degree in linguistic from Pune University.

Dr. Samant was an employee of the State government's Directorate of Languages for more than 20 years.

This dictionary is for the translators, teachers, professors and researchers. She chose the 3 languages mainly because it included business language (English), most commonly used language in India (Hindi) and her own language the mother tongue (Marathi).

With appreciation from experts, Samant was awarded Sandarbha Sahitya Puraskar by Maharashtra Sahitya Parishad, Utkrushta Vangmay Nirmitee Puraskar of the government of Maharashtra and the Homi Jehangir Bhabha Puraskar.
