= M. Teresa Espinal =

Linguist

Academic background
- Education: Universitat Autònoma de Barcelona (PhD)

Academic work
- Discipline: Linguistics
- Sub-discipline: Syntax-semantics interface
- Website: UAB faculty page

M. Teresa Espinal is a linguist and professor in the Departament de Filologia Catalana at Universitat Autònoma de Barcelona. Her research focuses on the syntax-semantics interface, in particular on areas including negation, prosody, and on various features of the Romance languages.

== Biography ==
Espinal received a bachelor's degree in Hispanic philology from Universitat Autònoma de Barcelona in 1978, a master's degree in linguistics from the University of London in 1981, and a PhD in linguistics from UAB in 1985.

Espinal is a professor of linguistics in the UAB Department of Catalan Philology, and has also been a member of the Catalan Institution for Research and Advanced Studies, and the Center for Theoretical Linguistics.

== Awards ==
In 2020, Espinal was awarded the Narcís Monturiol medal by the Catalan government in recognition of distinguished contributions to science and technology.

In 2023, Espinal was elected to the Academia Europaea.

== Selected publications ==
- Espinal, M. Teresa (1991). "The Representation of Disjunct Constituents". Language. 67 (4): 726–762. doi:10.2307/415075. JSTOR 415075.
- Espinal, Maria Teresa (1992). "Expletive Negation and Logical Absorption". The Linguistic Review. 9 (4). doi:10.1515/tlir.1992.9.4.333.
- Espinal, M Teresa (2000). "Expletive negation, negative concord and feature checking". Catalan Working Papers in Linguistics. 8: 47–69.
- Espinal, M. Teresa; McNally, Louise (2011). "Bare nominals and incorporating verbs in Spanish and Catalan". Journal of Linguistics. 47 (1): 87–128. doi:10.1017/S0022226710000228. hdl:10230/22816. ISSN 0022-2267. JSTOR 41261742.
