= Maribel Romero =

Spanish academic

- Born: August 27, 1967 (age 59); Badalona, Spain
- Awards: Member of the Academia Europaea

Academic background
- Education: University of Massachusetts, Amherst (PhD)
- Thesis: Focus and reconstruction effects in wh-phrases (1998)
- Doctoral advisor: Angelika Kratzer

Academic work
- Discipline: Linguistics
- Sub-discipline: Semantics

Maribel Romero is a Spanish professor of linguistics at the University of Konstanz. In 2022, she was elected as a Member of the Academia Europaea.

== Education and honor ==
Romero earned her Ph.D. in linguistics at University of Massachusetts Amherst in 1998. She has worked at the University of Pennsylvania and the University of Konstanz. She was elected as a Member of the Academia Europaea in 2022 for her "sustained academic excellence".

== Academic research ==
Romero's research falls under the umbrellas of formal semantics and pragmatics. Phenomena she has worked on include questions, quantifiers, focus, and counterfactuality. Her work includes experimental methodologies, and she is a member of the major research network XPrag in experimental pragmatics. She has led funded projects on questions, conditionals, and clausal embedding.

== Works (selected) ==
- Romero, Maribel (2005). "Concealed Questions and Specificational Subjects". Linguistics and Philosophy. 28 (6): 687–737. doi:10.1007/s10988-005-2654-9. ISSN 0165-0157. S2CID 62696557.
- Han, Chung-hye; Romero, Maribel (2004). "The Syntax Of Whether/Q … Or Questions: Ellipsis Combined With Movement". Natural Language & Linguistic Theory. 22 (3): 527–564. doi:10.1023/B:NALA.0000027674.87552.71. ISSN 0167-806X. S2CID 170231496.
- Romero, Maribel; Han, Chung-Hye (2004). "On Negative Yes/No Questions". Linguistics and Philosophy. 27 (5): 609–658. doi:10.1023/B:LING.0000033850.15705.94. ISSN 0165-0157. S2CID 170923456.
- Romero, Maribel (2024-01-16). "Biased Polar Questions". Annual Review of Linguistics. 10 (1): 279–302. doi:10.1146/annurev-linguistics-022421-064837. ISSN 2333-9683.
