= Viveka Adelswärd =

Swedish linguist

Baroness Viveka Adelswärd
- Born: Viveka Lindegren; March 17, 1942 (age 84)
- Citizenship: Sweden
- Education: Linköping University
- Title: Baroness

Karin Hedvig Viveka Adelswärd, née Lindegren (b. March 17, 1942, Oscar's parish in Stockholm), is a Swedish baroness, linguist and professor emerita in conversation analysis. Upon her retirement, she worked at the Department of Theme Communication at Linköping University. Adelswärd wrote Svenska Dagbladet's column Språkspalten in 1995–2011 and wrote columns in Östgöta Correspondent.

== Biography ==
Adelswärd received her doctorate in 1988. In 1999, she became full professor. Her research concentrates on how people understand and misunderstand each other in conversation. She has analyzed trials, job interviews, negotiations, parent-teacher conferences, interviews with young men seeking armed service, doctor-patient interviews, and stories of various kinds. She has also taken an interest in everyday conversation, so-called private rhetoric.

In addition to scientific publications, including some in English, Adelswärd has written several popular science books, e.g., "Talk, laughter, gossip, and Quarrels", "Women's Language and Women's Talk", and "Word on the Slide". She has held seminars and lectures and has been interviewed on radio and newspapers about her research. In several Nordic countries, Viveka Adelswärd has received less attention in academic linguistic contexts.

In 2002, a festschrift was published on the occasion of her 60th birthday.

In 2005, Viveka Adelswärd received the Swedish Academy's language conservation prize of SEK 50,000 mainly for her studies on conversation. On August 3, 1992, she debuted as a summer host Sommar in Sweden's Radio P1 program. She is a member of the Måltidsakademien in Stockholm, Brukskultur in Åtvidaberg and the Hagdahlsakademien.

She is involved in local cultural life in her hometown of Åtvidaberg. She has been chairman of the association Brukskultur where she has written articles about Adelsnäs, part of the Barony Adelswärd – where she formerly lived – among other things.

Viveka Adelswärd is the widow of the court huntsman (Hovjägmästare), Baron Johan Adelswärd, whom she met when she was 19 and married two years later, and is thus allowed to title herself a baroness – the only one in Sweden. She has three sons. She was, together with her husband, listed as one of the 100 richest persons in Sweden in 1996.

== Bibliography ==
- Talking, laughing, gossiping and arguing, and other things we do when we talk (1991, 1996)
- The Challenge of Heritage: Mid-Life Thoughts (1993).
- Understanding a story - or the story of the moose (1996)
- Home to School Talk (1997)
- Women's language and women's talk. Research and prejudice under 100 years (1999)
- Words on the Slide (2001)
- To the Glory of Nonsense (2009)
- The Faces of Man (2012) together with Per-Anders Forstorp (ed.)
- "Too Noble, Too Rich, Too Lazy": Jacques d'Adelswärd Fersen (2014)
- Jacques d'Adelswärd-Fersen: l'insoumis de Capri (Paris, 2018), with Jacques Perot
