= Anna Thornton (linguist) =

Italian morphologist (born 1960)

Anna Maria Thornton (born 9 July 1960 Rome, Italy) is a linguist specializing in Italian morphology. She is professor of linguistics at the University of L'Aquila in Italy.

== Education, career and honours ==
Thornton studied lettere at the Sapienza University of Rome, where she graduated with 110. In 1983, She then undertook graduate study at the University of Pisa, receiving her doctorate in 1989 for a thesis titled "Sui nomina actionis in italiano" (On action nominals in Italian).

Thornton has spent her whole academic career at the University of L'Aquila, starting as a researcher in 1992 before being promoted to associate professor in 2000 and full professor in 2005. She has held several positions within Italian linguistics: from 2016 to 2019 she was president of the "Società di Linguistica Italiana" (Italian Society for Linguistics; SLI), and since 2022 she has been a corresponding member of the Accademia della Crusca. In 2020 she was elected ordinary member of the Academia Europaea.

== Research ==
Thornton's research has focused on the structure of the Italian language, in particular its morphology. She has also written on issues of grammatical gender, language and gender and linguistic sexism. Thornton has been involved in creating and maintaining corpora of written Italian.

== Selected publications ==
- Laudanna, Alessandro, Anna M. Thornton, Giorgina Brown, Cristina Burani and Lucia Marconi. 1995. Un corpus dell'italiano scritto contemporaneo dalla parte del ricevente (A corpus of contemporary written Italian from the perspective of the recipient). In Sergio Bolasco, Ludovic Lebart and Andrè Salem (eds.), 3. Giornate internazionali di analisi statistica dei dati testuali (Third international conference on statistical analysis of textual data), 103–109. Rome: CISU.
- Burani, Cristina and Anna M. Thornton. 2003. The interplay of root, suffix and whole-word frequency in processing derived words. In R. Harald Baayen and Robert Schreuder (eds.), Morphological Structure in Language Processing, 157–208. Berlin: de Gruyter. doi:10.1515/9783110910186.157
- Bertinetto, Pier Marco, Cristina Burani, Alessandro Laudanna, Lucia Marconi, Daniella Ratti, Claudia Rolando and Anna M. Thornton. 2005. Corpus e Lessico di frequenza dell'Italiano Scritto (CoLFIS) (Corpus and frequency lexicon of written Italian). Rome: Istituto di Scienze e Tecnologie della Cognizione (Institute of Cognitive Science and Technology).
- Thornton, Anna M. 2011. Overabundance (multiple forms realizing the same cell): A non-canonical phenomenon in Italian verb morphology. In Martin Maiden, John Charles Smith, Maria Goldbach and Marc-Olivier Hinzelin (eds.), Morphological autonomy: perspectives from Romance inflectional morphology, 357–381. Oxford: Oxford University Press.
- Thornton, Anna M. 2012. Reduction and maintenance of overabundance: a case study on Italian verb paradigms. Word Structure 5 (2), 183–207. doi:10.3366/word.2012.0026
