= Sigrid Beck =

German linguist

Academic background
- Education: University of Tübingen (PhD)
- Doctoral advisor: Arnim von Stechow

Academic work
- Discipline: Linguistics
- Sub-discipline: Semantics
- Website: Tübingen faculty page

Sigrid Beck is a linguist and Chair Professor in the Department of English at the University of Tübingen. She researches semantics, in particular on areas including questions, plurals, and focus.

== Biography ==
Beck earned her PhD in linguistics at the University of Tübingen in 1996 with a dissertation entitled, "Wh-constructions and Transparent Logical Form." She held positions at the University of Massachusetts Amherst, the University of Connecticut, Universität Potsdam, and at the Massachusetts Institute of Technology, before taking up, in 2005, a Chair Professorship at the University of Tübingen.

== Awards ==
In 2022, Beck was elected to the Academia Europaea.

== Selected publications ==
- Beck, Sigrid (1 March 2006). "Intervention Effects Follow from Focus Interpretation*". Natural Language Semantics. 14 (1): 1–56. doi:10.1007/s11050-005-4532-y. ISSN 1572-865X. S2CID 44269046.
- Beck, Sigrid (1 January 1996). "Quantified structures as barriers for LF movement". Natural Language Semantics. 4 (1): 1–56. doi:10.1007/BF00263536. ISSN 1572-865X. S2CID 122961166.
- Beck, Sigrid; Johnson, Kyle (January 2004). "Double Objects Again". Linguistic Inquiry. 35 (1): 97–123. doi:10.1162/002438904322793356. ISSN 0024-3892. S2CID 18749803.
- Beck, Sigrid; Rullmann, Hotze (1 September 1999). "A Flexible Approach to Exhaustivity in Questions". Natural Language Semantics. 7 (3): 249–298. doi:10.1023/A:1008373224343. ISSN 1572-865X. S2CID 118685556.
