= Anne Carlier =

Linguist

Anne Carlier is a professor of linguistics at Sorbonne University in Paris. She specializes in syntax, semantics, and language change, particularly as regards the French language.

== Early life and education ==
Carlier was born in the First Congolese Republic, where she spent the first four years of her life. She was one of six children, and her mother held a doctorate in classical philology. After returning to Belgium, she studied at KU Leuven, where she received her first degree in 1983. Her doctoral thesis, defended in 1992 at the same institution, dealt with articles and generic interpretation in French, and was supervised by Ludo Melis.

== Career ==
From 1993 to 2008, Carlier served as assistant professor at the University of Valenciennes before moving to the University of Lille as full professor. In 2018 she took up her current position as full professor at Sorbonne University, where since 2021 she has directed the research unit Sens Texte Informatique Histoire (Meaning, Text, Computers, History).

== Awards and honours ==
- Carlier has been the recipient of numerous honours and awards.
- In 2019, she was elected member of the Belgian Royal Academy of French Language and Literature.
- In 2024, she was elected member of the Academia Europaea.

== Research ==
Carlier's research interests encompass theories of language change, nominal determination, grammatical aspect, voice and auxiliaries, within the broader domains of morphology, syntax, semantics and (from circa 2000) historical linguistics. She has worked primarily on French, including in a comparative Romance perspective, and has both used and created corpora of French.

== Selected publications ==
- Carlier, Anne. 2002. Les propriétés aspectuelles du passif (The aspectual properties of the passive). In Véronique Lagae, Anne Carlier & Céline Benninger (eds.), Temps et aspect: de la grammaire au lexique (Tense and aspect: from grammar to lexis), Cahiers Chronos 10, 41–63.
- Carlier, Anne. 2007. From preposition to article: The grammaticalization of the French partitive. Studies in Language 31, 1–49. doi:10.1075/sl.31.1.02car
- Carlier, Anne, & Walter De Mulder. 2010. The emergence of the definite article: ille in competition with ipse in Late Latin. In Kristin Davidse, Lieven Vandelanotte & Hubert Cuyckens (eds.), Subjectification, Intersubjectification and Grammaticalization, 241–275. Berlin: Mouton de Gruyter.
- De Mulder, Walter & Anne Carlier. 2011. The grammaticalization of definite articles. In Bernd Heine & Heiko Narrog (eds.), The Oxford handbook of grammaticalization, 522–534. doi:10.1093/oxfordhb/9780199586783.013.0042
- Carlier, Anne, & Béatrice Lamiroy. 2014. The grammaticalization of the prepositional partitive in Romance. In Silvia Luragho & Tuomas Huumo (eds.), Partitive cases and related categories, 477–519. Berlin: Mouton de Gruyter.
