= Elżbieta Magdalena Wąsik =

Polish linguist

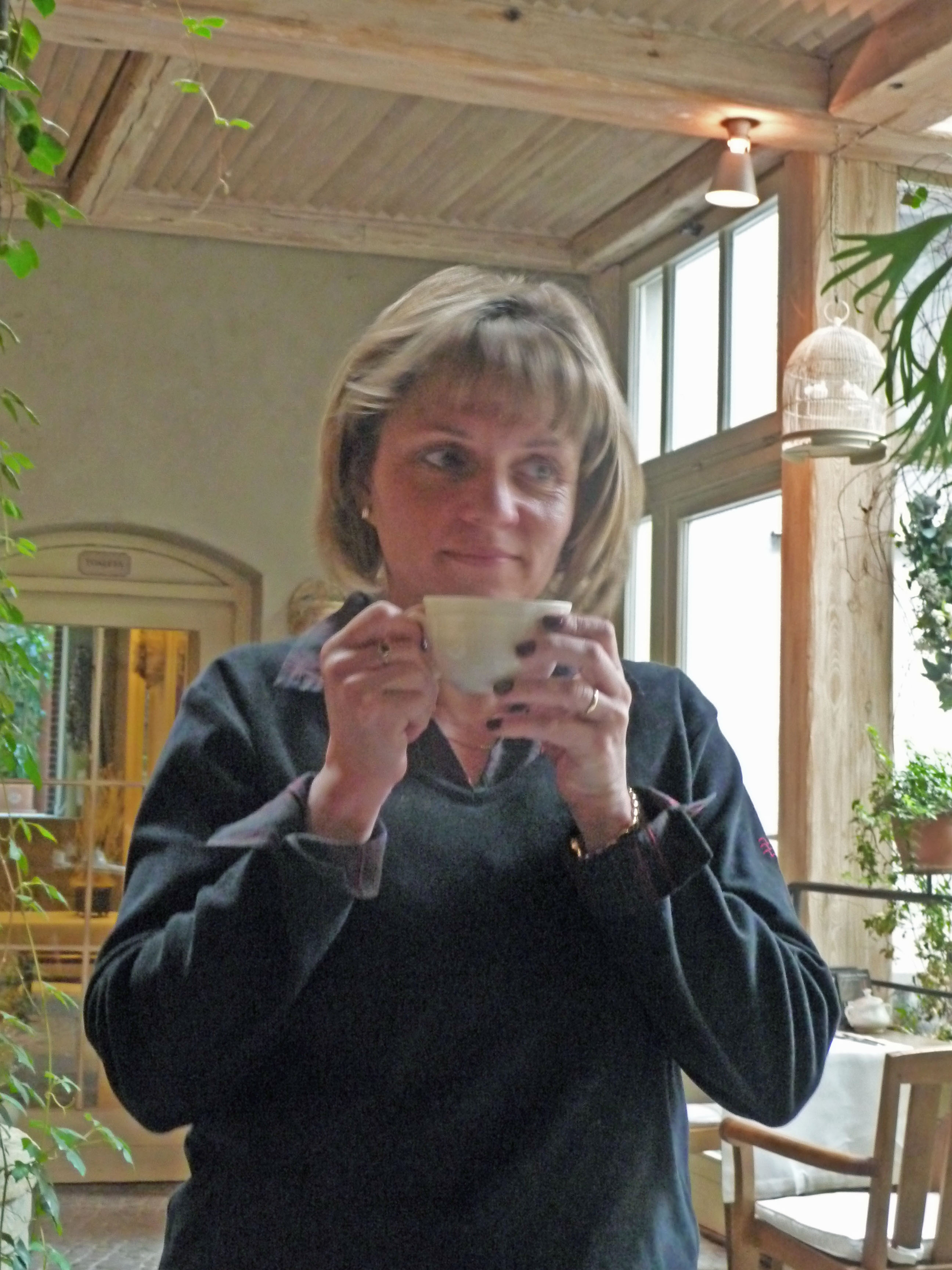
- Professor extraordinarius at Adam Mickiewicz University
- Born: April 25, 1961 (age 64); Kielce, Poland
- Scientific career
- Fields: General linguistics Semiotics; Communication theory
- Institutions: Adam Mickiewicz University

Elżbieta Magdalena Wąsik (born 25 April 1961 in Kielce, Poland) is a Polish linguist specializing in general linguistics and semiotics of communication.

== Educational career ==
She has got her basic education in the domain of German and Dutch general linguistics (1981–1986), along with the PhD in general linguistics (1995) from the University of Wrocław. Subsequently, she completed her habilitation at the Adam Mickiewicz University in Poznań in 2008 and received her D.Litt. degree.

== Professional experience ==
She obtained her D.Litt. of humanistic sciences degree in general linguistics after the habilitation colloquium on July 7, 2008, in the School of English of the AMU in Poznań, on the basis of the habilitation dissertation Language – A Tool or a Property of Man? Towards an Idea of Ecological Grammar of Human Linkages (Język – narzędzie czy właściwość człowieka? Założenia gramatyki ekologicznej lingwistycznych związków międzyludzkich).
