= Tecknad svenska =

Obsolete manually coded form of Swedish

Tecknad svenska, or Signed Swedish, is an obsolete manually coded form of Swedish that used signs of Swedish Sign Language for lexical words, supplemented by additional signs for grammatical words and inflectional endings. It was developed in the 1970s in the hopes of making Swedish more accessible to the deaf, but was later abandoned for being slow and inefficient. It was never a natural form of communication among deaf people.
