= Salamatou Sow =

Nigerien anthropologist and linguist

- Born: January 1, 1963 (age 63); Niamey, Niger
- Occupations: Anthropologist, linguist

Academic background
- Education: University of Niamey; Institut national des langues et civilisations orientales

Academic work
- Discipline: Linguistics
- Sub-discipline: Dialectology
- Institutions: Abdou Moumouni University

Salamatou Sow (born 1963) is a sociolinguist and anthropologist. She is from Niger and works on the Fulfulde language.
