= Maria Luisa Zubizarreta =

Paraguayan linguist

Maria Luisa Zubizarreta is professor emerita of linguistics at the University of Southern California.

== Education and personal life ==
Zubizarreta was born and raised in Asunción, Paraguay. She obtained her Licence in General Linguistics from Paris 8 University in 1977. One year later she obtained her Maîtrise in General Linguistics from Paris 8 University. In 1982, she acquired her PhD in Linguistics from the Massachusetts Institute of Technology, with a dissertation entitled On the Relationship of the Lexicon to Syntax. She held various academic positions before arriving at the University of Southern California (USC), where she held a position from 1988 until her retirement.

She was married to fellow USC linguist, Jean-Roger Vergnaud.

== Research ==
Zubizarreta has conducted her research within the framework of generative linguistics. More precisely, she is interested in linguistic theory as a model of mental competence and performance. Her approach is comparative and considers interface issues ranging from the relation between the lexicon and syntax (Zubizarreta 1987) to the prosody and syntax of focus (Zubizarreta 1998).

Zubizarreta has conducted empirical research into issues dealing with second language acquisition, focusing on the mental grammar of the learners as they develop interlanguage (Zubizarreta & Nava 2011). Her work has also explored person-related phenomena from a semantic perspective in different languages, including the use of person features in Paraguayan Guaraní (Zubizarreta & Pancheva 2017a, b).

== Honors ==
A workshop, entitled Person and Perspective, and a related Festschrift were organized in her honor in 2019. The Festschrift, published by Cambridge University Press, is entitled Exploring Interfaces.

== Selected publications ==
- On the Syntactic Composition of Manner and Motion. Linguistic Monograph Series, MIT Press,(ML Zubizarreta & E. Oh). 2007. ISBN 9780262240529
- Prosody, Focus, and Word Order, MIT Press. 1998. ISBN 9780262740210
- Levels of Representation in the Lexicon and in the Syntax, Foris Publications, 1987. Reprinted Mouton 2019. doi:10.1515/9783110859928
- Primitive Elements of Grammatical Theory: Papers by Jean-Roger Vergnaud and His Collaborators. Eds. K. McKinney-Bock and ML Zubizarreta, Routledge Press. 2013. ISBN 9781315889825
- On the lexicon-syntax interface in Romance languages (Special Issue). PROBUS 22.2 Eds. V. Demonte and ML Zubizarreta. 2010. DOI:10.1515/prbs.2010.005
- Encoding discourse-based meaning: Prosody vs. syntax. Implications for second language acquisition. (ML Zubizarreta & E. Nava). Lingua 121 [2011], 652–669. doi:10.1016/j.lingua.2010.06.013
- A note on the syntax of possession in Paraguayan Guaraní. (ML Zubizarreta & R. Pancheva). In Boundaries, Phases and Interfaces. Benjamins, 2017a. doi:10.1075/la.239.05zub
- A formal characterization of person-based alignment: The case of Paraguayan Guaraní. (ML Zubizarreta & R. Pancheva). Natural Language & Linguistic Theory, 35 [2017b], 1161–1204. JSTOR 45095225
