= Yiya Chen =

Linguist and phonetician

Yiya Chen is a linguist and phonetician specializing in speech prosody. She is professor of phonetics at Leiden University as well as senior researcher at the Leiden Institute for Brain and Cognition.

== Education and career ==
Chen began her studies at Beijing Foreign Studies University, where she earned her BA in 1992. Her graduate studies were carried out at Stony Brook University, from which she received an MA in 1999 and a PhD in 2003. The topic of her doctoral thesis was the phonetics and phonology of contrastive focus in Mandarin Chinese, investigated using experimental methods.

Prior to taking up her current position at Leiden University in 2007, Chen had short-term teaching and research positions at the University of Edinburgh, Radboud University Nijmegen, the University of Colorado Boulder, Cornell University and New York University.

== Research ==
Chen's research is in phonetics and laboratory phonology, with a focus on aspects of speech prosody and melody. Her research aims to shed light on prosodic variation and universality, and how these can inform general linguistic and psycholinguistic theories of processing and representation. She deploys multiple phonetic, psycholinguistic and neurolinguistic methods in service of these goals, including acoustic analyses, eye tracking, event-related potential studies and reaction-time experiments.

Her areal expertise is in Chinese, especially Mandarin and Wu Chinese, with interests in other Sinitic and Tibeto-Burman languages. Outside these families she has also carried out experimental work on speakers of Zulu, Ewe, Kedang and Selayarese.

== Honors and awards ==
In 2008 she was awarded a European Research Council Starting Grant to study the representation and processing of pitch variation in tonal languages. In 2020 she was awarded an NWO Vici grant entitled Melody in Speech.

In 2022 she was elected a Member of the Academia Europaea.

== Selected publications ==
- Chen, Yiya, and Agnes Weiyun He. 2001. Dui bu dui as a pragmatic marker: evidence from Chinese classroom discourse. Journal of Pragmatics 33 (9), 1441-1465.
- Chen, Yiya. 2006. Durational adjustment under corrective focus in Standard Chinese. Journal of Phonetics 34 (2), 176-201.
- Chen, Yiya, and Yi Xu. 2006. Production of weak elements in speech: evidence from f0 patterns of neutral tone in Standard Chinese. Phonetica 63 (1), 47-75.
- Chen, Yiya, and Carlos Gussenhoven. 2008. Emphasis and tonal implementation in Standard Chinese. Journal of Phonetics 36 (4), 724-746.
- Chen, Yiya. 2011. How does phonology guide phonetics in segment-f0 interaction? Journal of Phonetics 39 (4), 612-625.
- Gussenhoven, Carlos, Yiya Chen, Sónia Frota, and Pilar Prieto. 2013. Intonation. Oxford Bibliographies Online: Linguistics. doi:10.1093/OBO/9780199772810-0072
