= Isabelle Bril =

Linguist

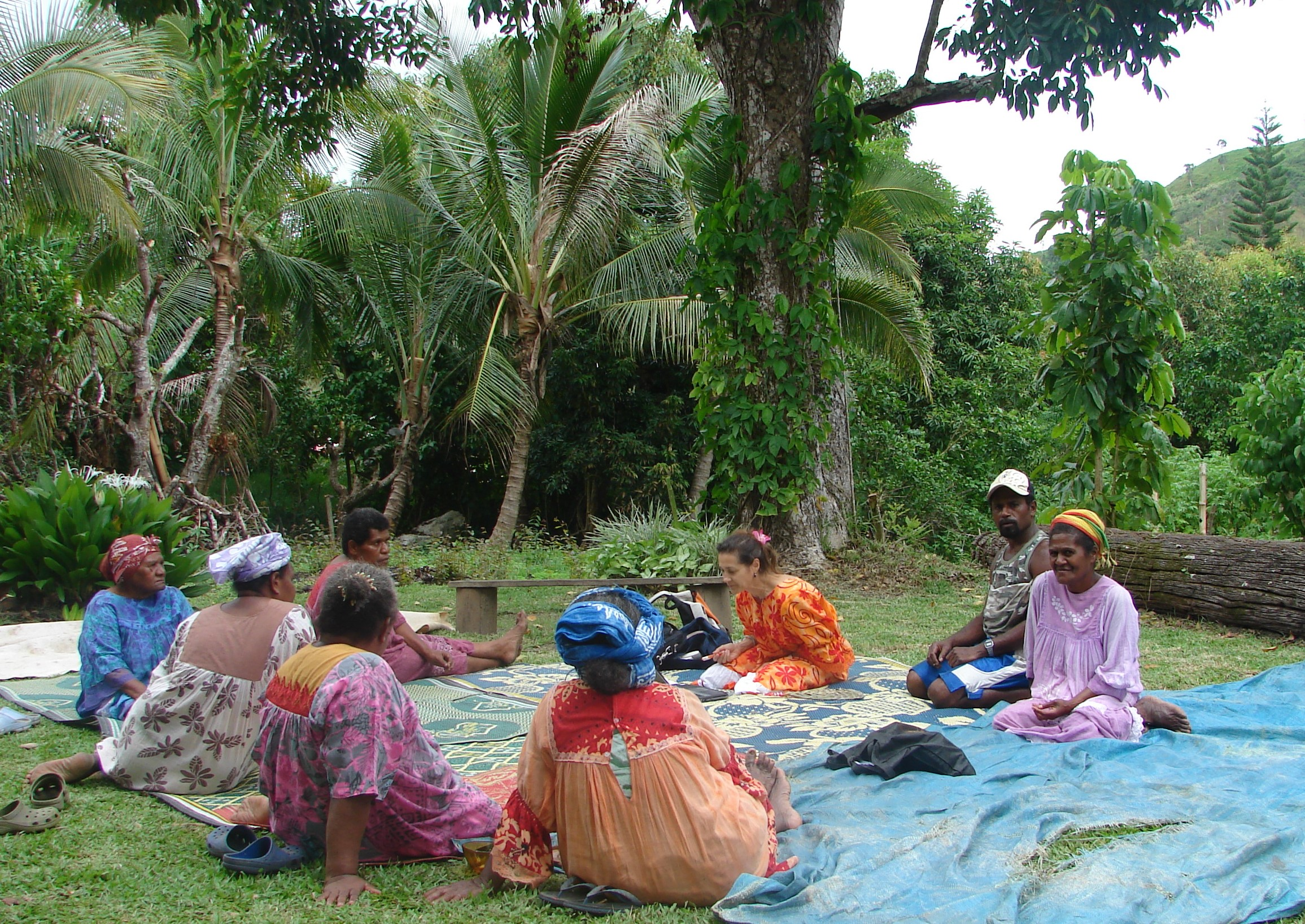
- Isabelle Bril with collaborators during a work session preparing a Zuanga (Yuanga) dictionary at the village of Paimboa, New Caledonia

Isabelle Bril is a senior researcher at the French National Centre for Scientific Research and a member of LACITO specializing in morphosyntax, semantics, typology, and Austronesian languages.

== Biography ==
Bril completed her agrégation in 1977, subsequently working as an English teacher between 1978 and 1993, then as Assistant Professor (Maître de Conférences) at Tours University between 1998 and 2001. Her doctoral degree was awarded in 1995 by Paris Diderot University for a book-length treatment of utterance structure in the Austronesian language Nêlêmwa. In 2005 she received her habilitation. She became a researcher at the French National Centre for Scientific Research in 2001, and was promoted to senior researcher first class in 2017. In 2014, she was elected Directeur d'Etudes at Ecole Pratique des Hautes Etudes in Paris.

In 2014, Bril was elected as a member of the Academia Europaea. She served as President of the Greenberg award of the Association for Linguistic Typology in 2011 and 2015; and as President of the Linguistic Society of Paris in 2023.

== Research ==
Bril's research focuses on the description and analysis of Austronesian languages, including Nêlêmwa, Zuanga, and Amis, from synchronic, diachronic and typological perspectives. In order to achieve this, she has carried out extensive and original linguistic fieldwork on these underdescribed and endangered languages.

The linguistic phenomena she has investigated include coordination and subordination, complex predicates, reciprocals, middles, symmetrical voice, valency, grammatical number, and possession.

== Selected publications ==
- Bril, Isabelle. 2000. Dictionnaire nêlêmwa-nixumwak-français-anglais: avec introduction grammaticale et lexiques (Nêlêmwa-Nixumak-French-English dictionary: with a grammatical introduction and lexica). Leuven: Peeters. ISBN 9789042908475
- Bril, Isabelle. 2002. Le nêlêmwa (Nouvelle-Calédonie): Analyse syntaxique et sémantique. (The Nêlêmwa language of New Caledonia: a syntactic and semantic analysis.) Leuven: Peeters. ISBN 9789042912229
- Bril, Isabelle. 2004. Complex nuclei in Oceanic languages: Contribution to an areal typology. In Bril and Ozanne-Rivierre (eds.), 1–48.
- Bril, Isabelle. 2004. Coordination strategies and inclusory constructions in New Caledonian and other Oceanic languages. In Martin Haspelmath (ed.), Coordinating constructions, 499–533. Amsterdam: John Benjamins.
- Bril, Isabelle, and Françoise Ozanne-Rivierre (eds.). 2004. Complex predicates in Oceanic languages. Berlin: Mouton de Gruyter. ISBN 9783110181883
- Bril, Isabelle. 2005. Semantic and functional diversification of reciprocal and middle prefixes in New Caledonian and other Austronesian languages. Linguistic Typology 9-1: 25–75. Berlin: Mouton de Gruyter.
- Bril, Isabelle (ed.). 2010. Clause linking and clause hierarchy: Syntax and pragmatics. Amsterdam: John Benjamins. ISBN 9789027205889
- Bril, Isabelle. 2012. Ownership, part-whole and other possessive-associative relations in Nêlêmwa (New Caledonia). In Alexandra Aikhenvald and R. M. W. Dixon (eds.), Possession and ownership: a cross-linguistic typology, 65–89.
- Bril, Isabelle. 2016. Information Structure in Northern Amis (Formosan): a morphosyntactic analysis. Oceanic linguistics, 55: 2, 451–481.
- Bril, Isabelle. 2017, Roots and stems: Lexical and functional flexibility in Amis and Nêlêmwa. Studies in Language. E. van Lier (ed.), Special issue on lexical flexibility in Oceanic languages, 41:2, 358–407.
- Bril, Isabelle. 2020. Indefinite expressions and accessibility hierarchy to core argument functions in a sample of Austronesian languages (and beyond). Studies in Language, 44:2, 407–460.
- Bril, Isabelle. 2022, Lexical restrictions on grammatical relations in voice constructions (Northern Amis). In Eva van Lier and Maria Messerschmidt (Eds.). Lexical restrictions on grammatical relations in voice and valency constructions. STUF Language Typology and Universals, 75(1), 21–71.
