= Elisabeth Piirainen =

German linguist

Elisabeth Piirainen, (née Dörrie, born 1943 in Hannover, – December 29, 2017), was a German linguist and philologist. After studying linguistics (including German language and Dutch studies) in Münster, Amsterdam, and Helsinki, she received her PhD in 1970 at the University of Münster. Afterwards she worked as an editor for German Language at the University of Jyväskylä located in central Finland. In 1963 she met the Finnish scholar of German language, Ilpo Tapani Piirainen, and married him in 1967. Since 1975, she was in charge of various projects related to Low German philology. From 2006 to 2010 she was a member of the Scientific Council of the European Society of Phraseology (Europhras). She has been an active scholar in phraseology, with a broad European scope. Fifty of her publications related to proverbs are listed by Wolfgang Mieder in his two-volume bibliography on paremiology and phraseology.

Retired, she lived in Steinfurt, Germany. She unexpectedly died on December 29, 2017. The breadth of her contribution and its impact was described soon after her death, "The fascinating world of widespread idioms: A tribute to Elisabeth Piirainen (1943-2017)".

== Awards ==
- 1967 Förderpreis für Westfälische Landeskunde
- 2001 the John Sass Award for her Phraseologie der westmünsterländischen Mundart (2 volumes) (Phraseology of West Münsterland dialect).

Recognition of her work:

- Fedulenkova, Tatiana. “Notes on Elisabeth Piirainen’s Linguistic Achievements [and] Elisabeth Piirainen: List of Publications.” Modern Phraseology Issues. Ed. Tatiana Fedulenkova. Arkhangelsk: Solti, 2018. 9-13 and 186-200.

== Publications ==
- Bessmoders Tied mundartliches Lesebuch, 1987, ISBN 3-926627-00-X *Wörterbuch der westmünsterländischen Mundart. Heimatverein Vreden, 1992, ISBN 3-926627-09-3
- Phraseologie der westmünsterländischen Mundart. Teil 1 und 2. (Lexikon der westmünsterländischen Redensarten), 2000 ISBN 3-926627-00-X
- Symbole in Sprache und Kultur (with Dmitrij O. Dobrovolʹskij), Bochum Brockmeyer, 1997, ISBN 3-8196-0487-1 *Phraseologie in Raum und Zeit. Schneider-Verl. Hohengehren, 2002, ISBN 3-89676-542-6
- Europeanism, internationalism or something else? Proposal for a cross-linguistic and cross-cultural research project on widespread idioms in Europe and beyond. Hermes, Journal of Linguistics 35:45-75, 2005.
- Figurative Language. Cross-cultural and Cross-linguistic Perspective (with Dmitrij O. Dobrovolʹskij), Amsterdam: Elsevier, 2005, ISBN 0-08-043870-9
- Zur Theorie der Phraseologie (with Dmitrij O. Dobrovolʹskij), Tübingen Stauffenburg-Verlag, 2009, ISBN 978-3-86057-179-8
- Endangered Metaphors (with Anna E. Idström), Amsterdam/Philadelphia, John Benjamins, 2012, ISBN 978-90-272-0405-9
- Widespread Idioms in Europe and Beyond. Toward a Lexicon of Common Figurative Units. New York: Peter Lang, 2012, ISBN 978-1-4331-0579-1

Co-authored

- Dobrovol’skij, Dmitrij, and Elisabeth Piirainen. “Conventional Figurative Language Theory and Idiom Motivation.” Yearbook of Phraseology 9 (2018), 5-30.
