= Mitsou Ronat =

French poet, linguist, and specialist of literary theory (1946–1984)

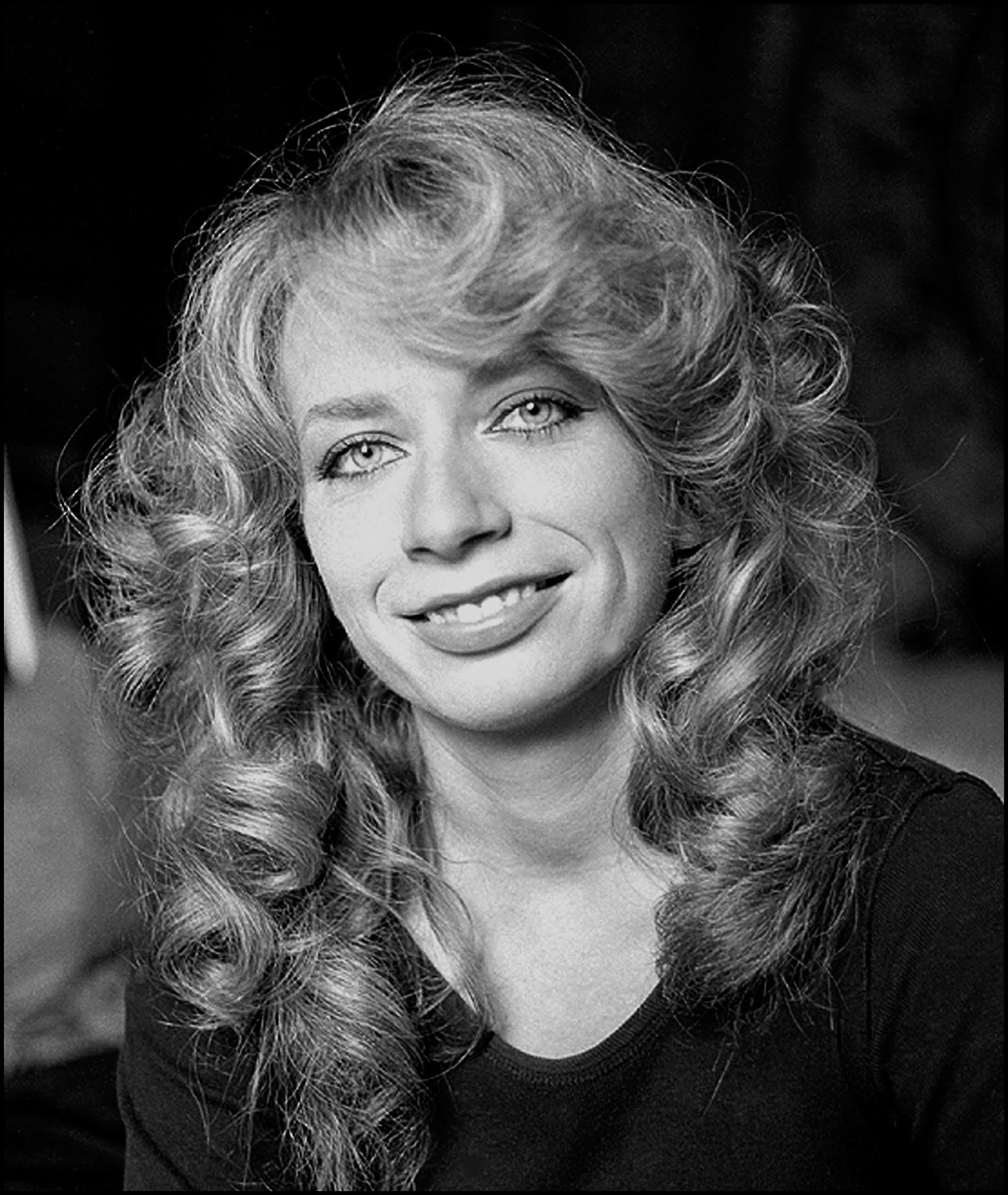
- Ronat in 1976
- Born: Germaine Gabrielle Ronat; June 13, 1946; Paris, France
- Died: July 8, 1984 (aged 38); Évry-les-Châteaux, France
- Occupations: Poet, linguist, writer

Mitsou Ronat (June 13, 1946 – July 8, 1984) was a French poet, linguist, and specialist of literary theory.

== Early life ==
Ronat was born in Paris, France. She obtained her Ph.D. in 1974 from Paris 8 University Vincennes-Saint-Denis.

== Career ==
As member of the committee of the journal Action poétique with Henri Deluy, Martine Broda, Jacques Roubaud and Elisabeth Roudinesco, she expressed critical views of Tel Quel and criticizes the use of linguistics made by Julia Kristeva

In 1967 she joined the collective Change, founded by Jean-Pierre Faye, where she advocated for a diffusion of Noam Chomsky's ideas, and the use of this type of linguistics in the analysis of literature.

She was also a member of the Polivanov circle, where she met several linguists and poets among which were Jacques Roubaud, Jean-Claude Milner, Jacqueline Guéron and Pierre Lusson. She published a number of papers which tend to show that Chomsky's notion of constraint can be extended to the study of literature.

A specialist on Stéphane Mallarmé and James Joyce, she criticized the analysis of Joyce developed by Philippe Sollers.

In 1980 she published (with Tibor Papp) a provocative edition of his poem "Un coup de dés jamais n'abolira le hasard".

Very close to Ann Banfield and Sige-Yuki Kuroda, Ronat obtained her Ph.D. in 1974.

She was a co-founder, with Pierre Pica and others, of the French Association des Sciences du Langage, she was the author of a dialogue with Noam Chomsky, and of several linguistics papers.

In the last part of her life, Mitsou Ronat became especially interested in the interface between language and prosody.

She was the author of several poems where she analyzed the relationship between language and vision.

== Death ==
Ronat was killed in a car accident on July 8, 1984, in the commune of Évry-les-Châteaux in the Île-de-France region of France.

== Bibliography ==
Ronat, Mitsou (1984), Focus, Intonation, Grammaire, Thèse d'état, unpublished, Paris, 255 pages.

Ronat, Mitsou (1975), La langue manifeste, Littérature et théories du langage, Action Poétique, Paris.
