= Marga Reis =

German linguist

- Born: June 18, 1941 (age 85); Aschaffenburg, Germany

Academic background
- Education: LMU Munich (PhD)

Academic work
- Discipline: German
- Sub-discipline: Latin philology, logic and theory of science

Marga Reis is a linguist and emerita professor of German Linguistics at the University of Tübingen. Her research interests are the grammar of present-day and diachronic German linguistics, with a focus on syntax, word formation, and the relationship between grammar and pragmatics.

== Biography ==
Reis received an MA in Latin philology from Bryn Mawr College in 1965, and earned a PhD in German at LMU Munich in 1970 with a dissertation entitled "Phonological theory and historical phonology. Studies of lengthening and shortening processes in German." ('Lauttheorie und Lautgeschichte. Untersuchungen am Beispiel der Dehnungs- und Kürzungsvorgänge im Deutschen'). In 1975, she completed a habilitation in German Philology at LMU Munich with "Presuppositions and Syntax" ('Präsuppositionen und Syntax').

Reis held positions as professor of German Linguistics at the University of Cologne (from 1975-1984) and the University of Tübingen (from 1984-2009). Since 2009, she is emerita professor at the University of Tübingen. Reis additionally held many visiting positions, including at Massachusetts Institute of Technology (1972-1973), Université de Paris VIII (1979-1980, 1982-1983), and the Centre General Linguistics (ZAS) in Berlin, Germany (1999-2000).

== Awards ==
In 2010, Reis was named Honorary Professor at the Institute for German Language and Linguistics at the Humboldt University of Berlin, Germany. In 2016, Reis was awarded the Wilhelm von Humboldt Prize for lifetime achievement in Germany.

== Selected publications ==
- Reis, Marga; Rosengren, Inger (1992). "What do Wh-imperatives tell us about Wh-movement?". Natural Language and Linguistic Theory. 10 (1): 79–118. doi:10.1007/BF00135359.
- Reis, M (1997). "A modular approach to the grammar of additive particles: the case of German Auch". Journal of Semantics. 14 (3): 237–309. doi:10.1093/jos/14.3.237.
- Kesper, Stephan; Reis, Marga, eds. (2005). Linguistic Evidence. De Gruyter Mouton. ISBN 978-3-11-019754-9.
- Reis, Marga; Wöllstein, Angelika (June 2010). "Zur Grammatik (vor allem) konditionaler V1-Gefüge im Deutschen". Zeitschrift für Sprachwissenschaft. 29 (1): 111–179. doi:10.1515/zfsw.2010.004.
- Beck, Sigrid; Reis, Marga (21 August 2018). "On the Form and Interpretation of Echo Wh-Questions". Journal of Semantics. 35 (3): 369–408. doi:10.1093/jos/ffy002.
