= Enikő Németh T. =

Hungarian linguist

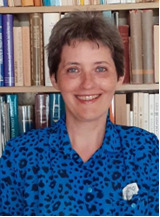
- Born: Enikő Bibokné Németh-Tóth; 15 September 1964 (age 61); Celldömölk, Hungary
- Education: University of Szeged; Hungarian Academy of Sciences
- Awards: Publication Award of the Hungarian Academy of Sciences (2019)
- Scientific career
- Fields: Linguistics (pragmatics)
- Workplaces: University of Szeged

Enikő Németh T. (full name Enikő Bibokné Németh-Tóth; born 15 September 1964 in Celldömölk, Hungary) is a Hungarian linguist known for her work on pragmatics.

== Education ==
Enikő Németh T. received MA degrees in both Russian Language and Literature and General and Applied Linguistics in 1987. She received her doctorate (candidate degree) in 1992 for a thesis dealing with theoretical issues regarding utterance type and the division of spoken discourse into utterance tokens. In 2017 she was awarded a higher doctorate in linguistics by the Hungarian Academy of Sciences, this time with the title Interaction Between Grammar and Pragmatics: the Case of Implicit Subject and Direct Object Arguments in Hungarian Language Use.

== Career and research ==
She began her career as assistant professor in the department of general linguistics at what was then the Attila József University of Szeged in 1990, and has spent her entire career at this institution: in 1997 she was promoted to associate professor, and in 2017 to full professor. Since 2013 she has also been head of the department.

Enikő Németh T.'s research in theoretical linguistics has focused on issues in pragmatics and discourse analysis such as intentions and perspectives in language use, the interaction of morphology and syntax with pragmatics, and the principles governing language use as well as the forms it takes.

== Awards and honours ==
She has been the recipient of various honours and awards. In 2021, she was elected as an ordinary member of the Academia Europaea. Since 2022 she has been corresponding member of the Hungarian Academy of Sciences. Her 2019 book, Implicit Subject and Direct Object Arguments in Hungarian Language Use: Grammar and Pragmatics Interacting was recognized with the academy's Publication Award.

== Selected publications ==
- Németh T., Enikő. 1996. A szóbeli diskurzusok megnyilatkozáspéldányokra tagolása (Segmentation of spoken discourse into utterance tokens). Budapest: Akadémiai Kiadó. ISBN 9630573296
- Németh T., Enikő. 2000. Occurrence and identification of implicit arguments in Hungarian. Journal of Pragmatics 32 (11), 1657–1682. doi:10.1016/S0378-2166(99)00114-9
- Németh T., Enikő. 2008. Verbal information transmission without communicative intention. Intercultural Pragmatics 5 (2), 153–176. doi:10.1515/IP.2008.009
- Németh T., Enikő, and Károly Bibok. 2010. Interaction between grammar and pragmatics: The case of implicit arguments, implicit predicates and co-composition in Hungarian. Journal of Pragmatics 42 (2), 501–524. doi:10.1016/j.pragma.2009.07.001
- Németh T., Enikő. 2019. Implicit Subject and Direct Object Arguments in Hungarian Language Use: Grammar and Pragmatics Interacting. Sheffield: Equinox. ISBN 9781781795965
