= Iraide Ibarretxe-Antuñano =

Linguist

Iraide Ibarretxe-Antuñano (born 12 August 1972 in Bilbao) is a professor of linguistics at the University of Zaragoza known for her research in cognitive linguistics and psycholinguistics.

== Education, career and honours ==
Ibarretxe-Antuñano graduated in English philology at the University of Deusto in 1995. She subsequently enrolled for doctoral studies at the University of Edinburgh, where she obtained her PhD in linguistics in 2000 for a thesis entitled Polysemy and metaphor in perception verbs: a crosslinguistic study, supervised by Ronnie Cann and Jim Miller. Between 1999 and 2001 she held a postdoctoral position at the University of California, Berkeley, working with Eve Sweetser and Dan Slobin, while also collaborating as a visiting researcher at the International Computer Science Institute in Berkeley. After her time in America she continued her research as a postdoctoral fellow at the University of Deusto between 2001 and 2003, during which time she conducted research stays at the Max Planck Institute for Psycholinguistics. Simultaneously, from 2002 to 2003 she worked as assistant professor at the University of the Basque Country.

In 2003, Ibarretxe-Antuñano took up a position as assistant professor at the University of Zaragoza, where she has been working in teaching and research ever since. She was promoted to associate professor in 2008 and full professor in 2020. During this time she carried out further research stays at the MPI Nijmegen as well as the University of Concepción (Chile), UC Berkeley, and the University of Lund (Sweden). In 2019 she was elected ordinary member of the Academia Europaea.

== Research ==
Ibarretxe-Antuñano is known for her research on lexical semantics and pragmatics, adopting theoretical approaches from cognitive linguistics and methods from psycholinguistics, as well as typology, contrastive linguistics and applied linguistics. She has worked on Germanic languages, minority Romance languages and Basque. Her published research deals with such topics as lexicalization, polysemy, iconicity, ideophones, and the interrelationships between metaphor, embodied cognition and culture.

== Selected publications ==
- Ibarretxe-Antuñano, Iraide. 1999. Metaphorical Mappings in the Sense of Smell. In R. W. Gibbs Jr. & G. J. Steen (eds.), Metaphor in Cognitive Linguistics, 29–45. Amsterdam: John Benjamins.
- Bohnemeyer, Jürgen, Nicholas J. Enfield, James Essegbey, Iraide Ibarretxe-Antuñano, Sotaro Kita, Friederike Lüpke, & Felix K Ameka. 2007. Principles of event segmentation in language: The case of motion events. Language 83 (3), 495–532. doi:10.1353/lan.2007.0116
- Ibarretxe-Antuñano, Iraide. 2004. Motion events in Basque narratives. In Sven Strömqvist & Ludo Verhoeven (eds.), Relating Events in Narrative: Typological and contextual perspectives, vol. 2, 89–112. New York: Psychology Press.
- Ibarretxe-Antuñano, Iraide. 2009. Path salience in motion events. In Jiansheng Guo, Elena Lieven, Nancy Budwig, Susan Ervin-Tripp, Keiko Nakamura & Şeyda Őzçalişkan (eds.), Crosslinguistic Approaches to the Psychology of Language: Research in the Tradition of Dan Isaac Slobin, 403–414. London/New York: Psychology Press.
- Ibarretxe-Antuñano, Iraide, & Javier Valenzuela. 2012. Lingüística cognitiva. Barcelona: Anthropos. ISBN 9788415260370
