= Elisabeth Karg-Gasterstädt =

German medievalist and linguist (1886–1964)

- Born: Klara Elisabeth Gasterstädt; 9 February 1886; Gröditz, Kingdom of Saxony, German Empire
- Died: 24 August 1964 (aged 78); Leipzig, East Germany
- Education: Leipzig University
- Occupations: Medievalist, philologist
- Known for: Old High German Dictionary

Klara Elisabeth Karg-Gasterstädt (born 9 February 1886 in Gröditz; died 24 August 1964 in Leipzig) was a German medievalist, professor of German philology at the University of Leipzig and head of the effort to publish the Old High German Dictionary.

== Biography ==
Karg-Gasterstädt was the daughter of Karl Gasterstädt, a factory director from Swabia, and his wife, Sophie, née Schönleber. Klara attended a teachers' college in Stuttgart from 1909 to 1912, and after graduation she was allowed to teach middle and higher grades. From there she went on to work as a substitute teacher at the Königin-Katharina-Stift, and then became a full-time teacher at the Prieser Higher Girls' School.

Starting in 1914, she studied German, English and Romance classics for two semesters at the University of Tübingen, and from 1915 to 1918 she studied old German languages from philology professor Eduard Sievers at Leipzig University.

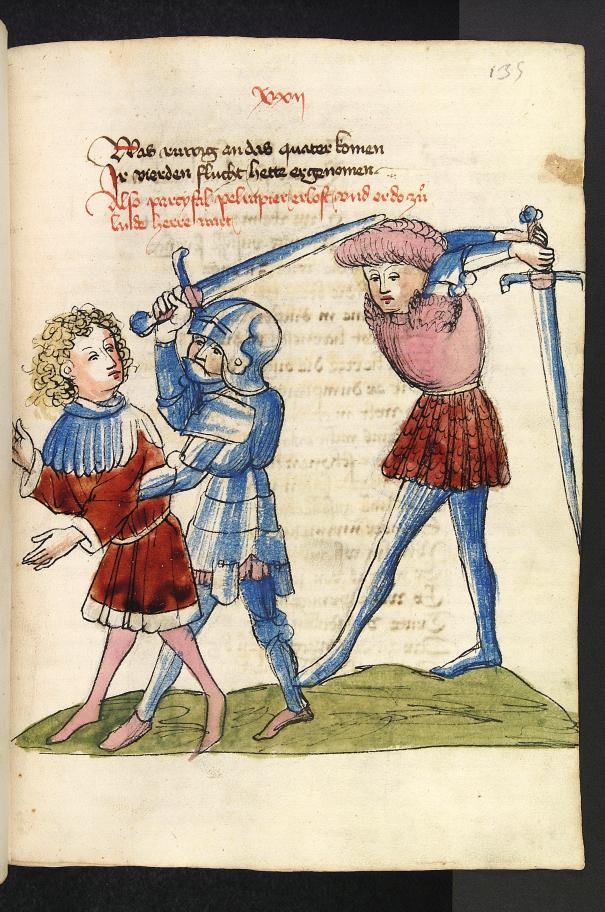
Illuminated manuscript page from Parzival (early 13th century).

In 1918, Karg-Gasterstädt was employed as a librarian at the German Institute of the University of Leipzig and received her Ph.D. there in 1920 with a dissertation titled, On the History of the Origins of Parzival, which proposes "four different sound types" in the ancient Middle High German text written by knight-poet Wolfram von Eschenbach. She started work on her habilitation thesis for a postdoctoral degree but she abandoned that effort for reasons of time and health.

With her doctorate in hand, she worked as a research assistant at the German Institute. In 1930, she was named a member of the Saxon Examination Commission for Higher Education. In 1932, working with collaborator Theodor Frings, she published works about the history of the German language and literature.

She married the German philologist and folklorist professor Fritz Karg in 1922, but 1933, she was forced to leave her position at the university because of a ban on double incomes for married couples. After her divorce in 1934 (when her husband was convicted of fraud), she was named head of the Old High German Dictionary and contributed to the author's lexicon, Die deutsche Literatur des Mittelalters (The German Literature of the Middle Ages).

== Retirement years ==
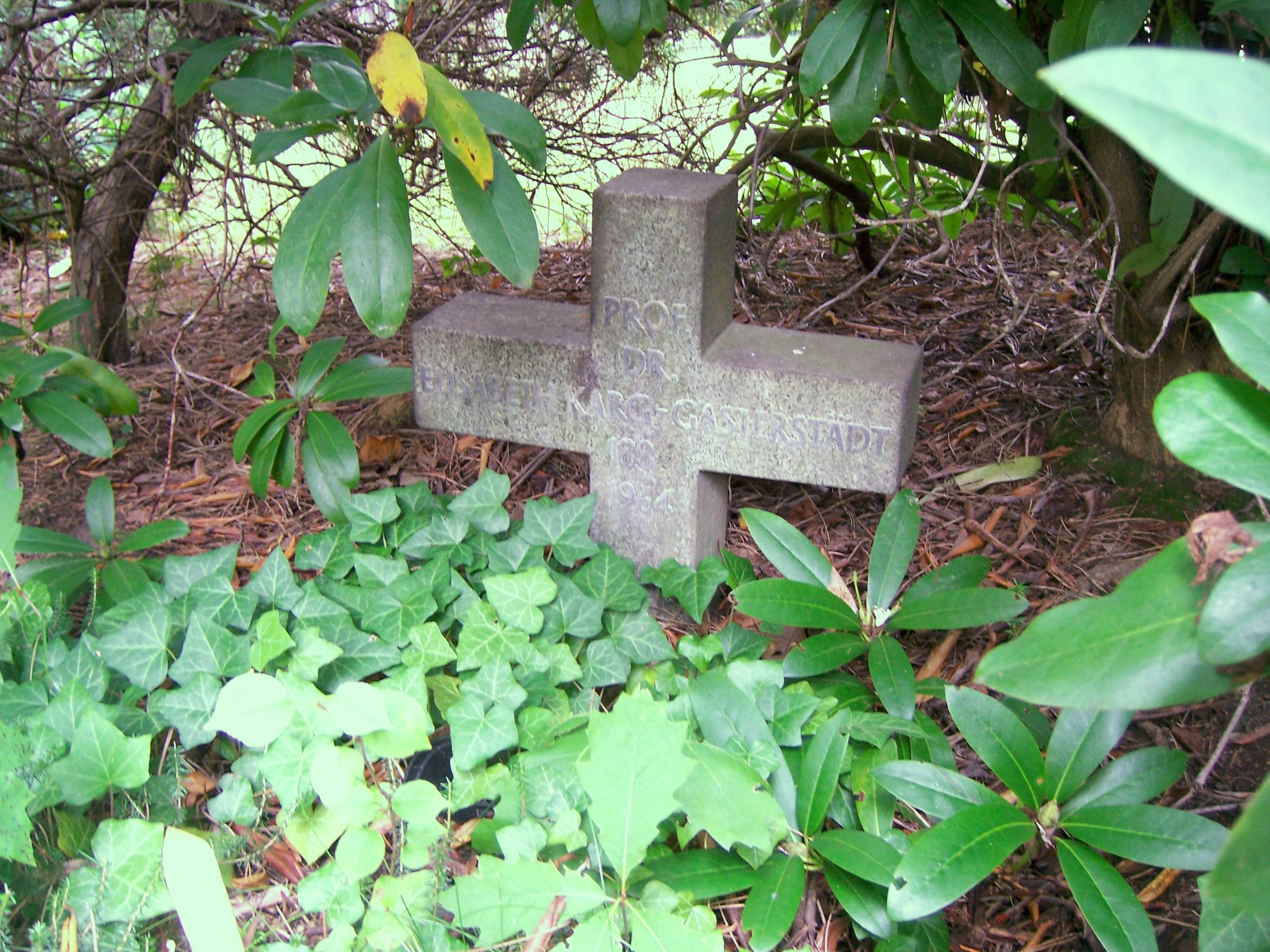
Gravesite of Karg-Gasterstädt.

In 1955, she retired from academic life and was elected a full member of the Saxon Academy of Sciences.

On the occasion of her 75th birthday, the apolitical scholar was honored with the Patriotic Order of Merit of the German Democratic Republic in silver.

Until her death on 24 August 1964 in Leipzig, Karg-Gasterstädt continued her efforts to improve the Old High German Dictionary.

== Selected works ==
- Karg-Gasterstädt, Elisabeth. On the origins of Parzival. M. Niemeyer, Halle / Saale 1925.
- Frings, Theodor, and Elisabeth Karg-Gasterstädt. Eduard Sievers, born in Lippoldsberg ad Weser on 25 November 1850, died in Leipzig on 30 March 1932. Teubner, 1933.
- Karg-Gasterstädt, Elisabeth. "FROM THE WORKSHOP OF THE OLD GERMAN DICTIONARY." Contributions to the History of German Language and Literature (PBB) 1938.62 (1938): 55-59.
- Karg-Gasterstädt, Elisabeth. "TO THE GLOSSES OF REICHENAUER MANUSCRIPT Rc (CARLSR. AUG. CCXX)." Contributions to the History of German Language and Literature (PBB) 1938.62 (1938): 454-456.
- Karg-Gasterstädt, Elisabeth "ADDENDUMS TO THE OLD HIGH GERMAN GLOSSEN." Contributions to the history of the German language and literature (PBB) 1940.64 (1940): 263-271.
- Frings, Theodor, Rudolf Große, Elisabeth Karg-Gasterstädt, Elias von Steinmeyer, and Siegfried Blum. Old High German dictionary. Akademie-Verlag, 1952.
- Karg-Gasterstädt, Elisabeth. "Old High German thing — New High German thing." The story of a word, Berlin (1958).
- Karg-Gasterstädt, Elisabeth. "Eberhard Gottlieb Graff." New German biography, published by the historical commission at the Bavarian Academy of Sciences (1964): 730-731.
- Karg-Gasterstädt, Elisabeth. Old High German dictionary: on the basis of the collections left by Elias von Steinmeyer on behalf of the Saxon Academy of Sciences in Leipzig. Vol. 2. Akademie-Verlag, 1997.
