= Raffaella Zanuttini =

Italian linguist (born 1960)

- Born: October 31, 1960 (age 65)

Academic background
- Education: University of Pennsylvania
- Thesis: Syntactic properties of sentential negation. A comparative study of Romance languages (1991)

Academic work
- Discipline: Linguist
- Sub-discipline: Syntax; Linguistic variation
- Institutions: Yale University; Georgetown University

Raffaella Zanuttini is an Italian linguist whose research focuses primarily on syntax and linguistic variation. She is a Professor of Linguistics at Yale University in New Haven, Connecticut.

== Education and career ==
Zanuttini completed her Ph.D. at the University of Pennsylvania in 1991 under Anthony Kroch and Richard S. Kayne, with a dissertation entitled Syntactic Properties of Sentential Negation. A Comparative Study of Romance Languages. Zanuttini was first an Assistant Professor (1992–1997) and then an Associate Professor in the Department of Linguistics at Georgetown University Prior to beginning her tenure at Yale in 2008. Zanuttini is a Professor of Linguistics and Chair of the Department of Linguistics at Yale University.

== Research ==
She is the author and coauthor of six books and has published numerous articles on micro-syntactic variation, clause types, and sentential negation.

The majority of Zanuttini's research falls into three categories: micro-syntactic variation, clause types, and sentential negation. Micro-syntactic variation refers to minute differences between different varieties of a language spoken in a given geographic region. Zanuttini's studies within this area focus on Romance languages and minority varieties of English in North America, like Appalachian English. Her work with clause types involves giving more precise definition to, and differentiation between different types of clausal constructions such as declarative, exclamative, and imperative clauses.

Zanuttini founded the Yale Grammatical Diversity Project in 2011. Members of the project, housed at Yale University, conduct research on minority varieties of English spoken in North America and micro-syntactic differences between them. Presently, Zanuttini remains a leader of the project, alongside Laurence Horn and Jim Wood.

She has received three major grants from the National Science Foundation (2003–2005, 2006–2008, and 2014–2017) to conduct collaborative research on minority varieties of English.

== Selected publications ==
=== Books ===
- Zanuttini, R. (1997) Negation and Clausal Structure: A Comparative Study of Romance Languages. Oxford Studies in Comparative Syntax.
- Kayne, R., T. Leu and R. Zanuttini (2013) An Annotated Syntax Reader: Lasting Insights and Questions Wiley-Blackwell, 2013.
- Zanuttini, R. and L. Horn (2014) Micro-Syntactic Variation in North American English. Oxford Studies in Comparative Syntax.
- Bowern, C., L. Horn and R. Zanuttini, editors (2017) On looking into words (and beyond): Structures, Relations, Analyses. Language Science Press.
- Zanuttini, R., H. Campos, E. Herburger and P. Portner, editors (2006) Crosslinguistic Research in Syntax and Semantics Negation, Tense, and Clausal Architecture. Georgetown University Press.
- Cinque, G, J. Koster, J-Y Pollock, L. Rizzi and R. Zanuttini, editors. (1994) Paths towards Universal Grammar. Studies in Honor of Richard S. Kayne (ed). Georgetown University Press. (With

=== Selected articles ===
- Wood, J., R. Zanuttini, L. Horn and Jason Zentz (2020) "Dative country: Markedness and Geographical Variation in Southern Dative Constructions". American Speech 95: 3-45. Awarded the "Roger Shuy Best Paper in American Speech Award for 2020" by the American Dialect Society.
- Portner, P, M. Pak and R. Zanuttini (2019) The speaker-addressee relation at the syntax-semantics interface. Language 95.1: 1–36.
- Wood, J. and R. Zanuttini (2018) "Datives, data and dialect syntax in American English". Glossa: a journal of general linguistics, 3(1):87.
- Zanuttini, R., J. Wood, J. Zentz and L. Horn (2018) "The Yale Grammatical Diversity Project: Morphosyntactic variation in North American English." Linguistics Vanguard, 4(1).
- Wood, J., L. Horn, R. Zanuttini and L. Lindemann (2015) “The Southern Dative Presentative meets Mechanical Turk”, American Speech 90(3):291–320.
- Poletto, C. and R. Zanuttini (2013) "Emphasis as reduplication: Evidence from si che/no che sentences", Lingua 128: 124–141.
- Zanuttini, R, M. Pak and P. Portner (2012) “A Syntactic Analysis of Interpretive Restrictions on Imperative, Promissive, and Exhortative Subjects.” Natural Language and Linguistic Theory, 30(4):1231–1274.
- Zanuttini, R. (2008) “Encoding the Addressee in the syntax: Evidence from English imperative subjects.” Natural Language and Linguistic Theory, 26(1):185–218.
- Pak, M., P. Portner and R. Zanuttini (2008) “Agreement in Promissive, Imperative, and Exhortative Clauses.” Korean Linguistics, 14:157–175.
- Zanuttini, R. and P. Portner (2000) “The characterization of exclamative clauses in Paduan.” Language 76(1):123–132.
