= Kristen Syrett =

American linguist

Kristen Syrett is a linguist whose work focuses on language acquisition, psycholinguistics, semantics, and pragmatics.

== Career ==
Syrett completed her Ph.D. at Northwestern University in 2007 as a student of Jeffrey Lidz, Christopher Kennedy, and Sandra Waxman, with a dissertation titled Learning about the structure of scales: Adverbial modification and the acquisition of the semantics of gradable adjectives.

She has been on the faculty at Rutgers since 2011, becoming an associate professor in 2017. She has served as the undergraduate program director of linguistics and director of the Rutgers Laboratory for Developmental Language Studies. Before joining the faculty, she was first a postdoctoral associate at the Rutgers Center for Cognitive Science (2007-2008) and then a postdoctoral fellow at the Rutgers Center for Cognitive Science (2008-2011).

== Honors and awards ==
Syrett is a prominent figure in the Linguistics Society of America (LSA), having been twice awarded the Linguistic Service Award, first in 2007 and again as a co-awardee in 2020. In 2018, she received the Early Career Award from the LSA, which recognizes "scholars early in their career who have made outstanding contributions to the field of linguistics". As a student she received the prestigious Bernard and Julia Bloch Fellowship, the highest award to students offered by the society, and served as the student delegate to the executive committee of the LSA. In 2021 she became the chair of the LSA's Public Relations Committee.

== Selected publications ==
=== Books ===
- Syrett, K. and S. Arunachalam, Eds. (2018). Semantics in Language Acquisition. John Benjamins.

=== Selected articles ===
- Kennedy, C. and K. Syrett (2022). "Numerals denote degree quantifiers: Evidence from child language". Measurements, Numerals and Scales, 135-162.
- Syrett, Kristen, Christopher Kennedy, and Jeffrey Lidz. (2010). "Meaning and Context in Children's Understanding of Gradable Adjectives". Journal of Semantics, 27(1):1-35.
