= Eloína Miyares Bermúdez =

Cuban linguist

Eloina Miyares Bermudez
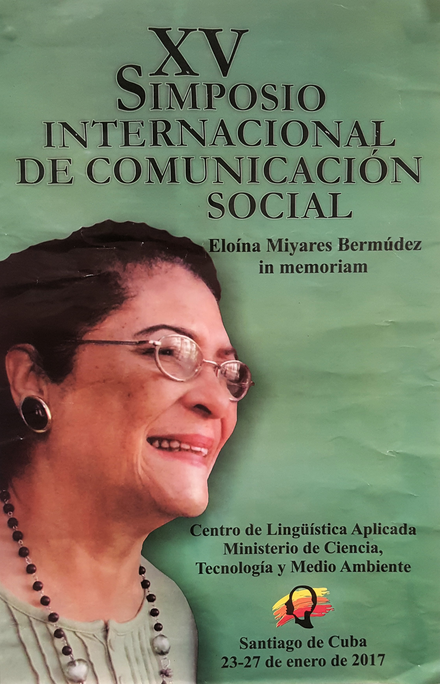
- Eloina Miyares
- Born: 1928; Santiago de Cuba, Republic of Cuba
- Died: 2015; Santiago de Cuba

Eloina Miyares Bermudez (1928 – July 26, 2015) was a Cuban linguist and academician. She led the creation of the Diccionario Básico Escolar (DBE; Cuban basic school dictionary) from its first edition in 2005 until its fourth edition (digital in 2013 and paper in January 2015). The Diccionario Básico Escolar is one of the books with the greatest circulation in Cuba.

With her husband, philologist Julio Vitelio Ruiz Hernández, she founded the Center for Applied Linguistics of Santiago de Cuba (CLA).

== Biography ==
Eloina Miyares Bermudez studied at the Escuela Normal de Oriente, from which she graduated in 1947. She first served as a teacher of rural areas in the municipality of Palma Soriano, where she participated in the literacy campaign. She then studied at the Faculty of Humanities of the University of Santiago de Cuba, graduating with a degree in Letters. She taught at the university until 1972 when she became a researcher at the Center of Applied Linguistics of the Academy of Sciences. She studied acoustic phonetics at the Institute of the Czech Academy of Sciences in Prague.

With her husband, Julio Vitelio Ruiz Hernández, she created a methodology for teachers and students to improve their pronunciation and spelling. The couple also founded the CLA in 1971.

Bermudez had at least seven sons, including Dr. Leonel Miyares Ruiz.

== Selected works ==
- 1998, Diccionario escolar ilustrado
- 1999, Vacuna ortográfica VAL-CUBA : nivel primario : metodología para prevenir y erradicar las faltas de ortografía
- 2000, En torno al sustantivo y adjetivo en el español actual
- 2003, Diccionario básico escolar
- 2006, Léxico activo-funcional del escolar cubano
- 2006, Linguistics in the twenty first century
