= Christa Dürscheid =

German linguist and professor

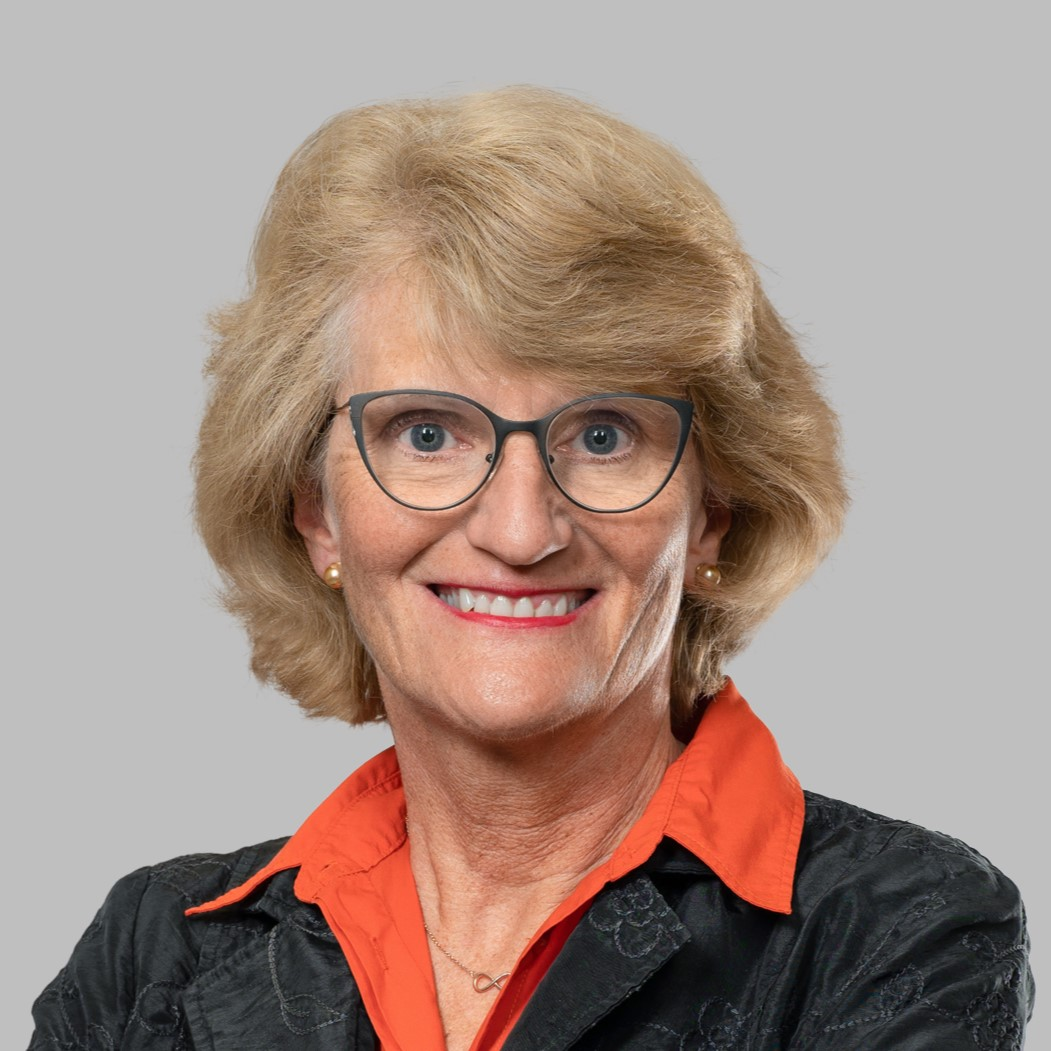
- Born: October 4, 1959 (age 66); Kehl-Kork, Germany
- Education: University of Freiburg; University of Cologne
- Occupations: Linguist; professor
- Website: https://www.ds.uzh.ch/p/duerscheid

Christa Dürscheid (born October 4, 1959 in Kehl-Kork, Germany), is a German linguist and professor at the University of Zurich, Switzerland. Her main research interests include grammar, variational linguistics, didactics of language, writing systems, and media linguistics. In the English-speaking research community, she is best known for her publications about language use in the New Media.

== Education and career ==
After studying German, French and didactics at the universities of Freiburg and Cologne, Dürscheid took her PhD in 1988. In 1998, she finished her habilitation (postdoc project) with a monograph entitled "Die verbalen Kasus des Deutschen. Untersuchungen zur Syntax, Semantik und Perspektive" ('Verbal cases in German. Analyses of syntax, semantics and perspectives').

Between 1994 and 1999, she taught as a guest lecturer at the following universities: Charles University Prague, Eötvös Loránd University Budapest, Nanjing University (PR of China), Volgograd State University (Russia), and St. Kliment Ohridski University Sofia (Bulgaria), besides working as research assistant at the University of Cologne. From 1999 to 2000 she taught at the University of Stuttgart (Germany), from 2000 to 2002 at the University of Münster (Germany). Since 2002, she has been a Professor of German Linguistics at the German Department (University of Zurich), with a focus on contemporary linguistics. Between 2006 and 2011 she was vice dean for teaching at the Faculty of Arts (University of Zurich).

In the years 2006 to 2011, she was also the leader of the research project "Writing competences and new media" (funded by the Swiss National Science Foundation). From 2011 to 2018, she led the research project "Regional Variation in the Grammar of Standard German", (funded by SNSF, DFG and FWF) together with colleagues from Austria and Germany. The results of this project have been published in the "Variantengrammatik" which is accessible in Open Access format to scholars and the interested public. In addition, Dürscheid was one of the program leaders of the Sinergia project "SMS communication in Switzerland: Facets of linguistic variation in a multilingual country", (funded by the SNSF) and together with Federica Diémoz, headed the subproject "Language Design in WhatsApp: Icono/Graphy", that belongs to the Sinergia project "What's up, Switzerland?". Since 2021, she has been leading the project "Mourning practices on the Internet" as part of the University Research Priority Program (URPP) "Digital Religion(s)" at the University of Zurich. In 2022, she took over the co-leadership of the trinational research project "Variational Pragmatics of German: Comparing Communicative Patterns" (funded by SNSF, DFG and FWF).

She posted a daily tweet on Twitter (now X) (VariantenGrammatik).

== Honors and awards ==
In 2020 Dürscheid was granted the Konrad Duden Award. In 2022, she was also elected to the German Academy for Language and Literature.

== Selected publications ==
=== About language use in the New Media ===
- with Elisabeth Stark: SMS4science: An international corpus-based texting project and the specific challenges for multilingual Switzerland. In: Thurlow, Crispin/Mroczek, Kristine (Eds.): Digital Discourse. Language in the New Media. Oxford University Press, Oxford (= Oxford Studies in Sociolinguistics), 299–320. 2011.
- with Andreas H. Jucker: The Linguistics of Keyboard-to-screen Communication. A New Terminological Framework. Linguistik online 56, 6/2012
- with Carmen Frehner: Email communication. In: Herring, Susan C./Stein, Dieter/Virtanen, Tuija (Eds.): Pragmatics of Computer-Mediated Communication. Mouton de Gruyter, Berlin/New York (= Handbook of Pragmatics 9), 35–54. 2013.
- with Karina Frick: Schreiben digital. Wie das Internet unsere Alltagskommunikation verändert. Kröner, Stuttgart (= Einsichten 3) 2016.

=== Others ===
- Die verbalen Kasus des Deutschen: Untersuchungen zur Syntax, Semantik und Perspektive. De Gruyter, Berlin 1999.
- with Franc Wagner and Sarah Brommer: Wie Jugendliche schreiben. Schreibkompetenz und neue Medien. De Gruyter, Berlin 2010.
- Syntax: Grundlagen und Theorien. Westdeutscher Verlag, Wiesbaden 2000; 6th edition: Vandenhoeck & Ruprecht, Göttingen 2012.
- Einführung in die Schriftlinguistik. Westdeutscher Verlag, Wiesbaden 2002; 5th edition: Vandenhoeck & Ruprecht, Göttingen 2016.
- with Jan Georg Schneider: Standardsprache und Variation. Narr, Tübingen 2019.
- with Stephan Elspaß and Arne Ziegler: Variantengrammatik des Standarddeutschen. Ein Online-Nachschlagewerk. Verfasst von einem Autorenteam unter der Leitung von Christa Dürscheid, Stephan Elspaß und Arne Ziegler. Open access.
- with Dimitrios Meletis: Writing Systems and Their Use. An Overview of Grapholinguistics. Mouton de Gruyter, Berlin/Boston 2022. Open access.
- Dürscheid, Christa (2023): Deutsch im Fokus. Sprachdidaktik, Internetkommunikation, Grammatik. Ausgewählte Schriften. Berlin: Frank & Timme (= Sprachwissenschaft 59).
