= List of fellows of the Linguistic Society of America =

In the scientific discipline of linguistics, the Linguistic Society of America (LSA) is a learned society devoted to the advancement of all branches of linguistics. Founded in 1924, the LSA has elected fellows since 2006. This article is a list of its fellows.

== Fellows of the LSA ==
=== 2006 ===
- Arnold Zwicky
- Arthur S. Abramson (D)
- Barbara Partee
- Calvert Watkins (D)
- Charles J. Fillmore (D)
- D Terence Langendoen
- David M. Perlmutter
- Dell Hymes (D)
- Elizabeth C. Traugott
- Emmon Bach (D)
- Eric Hamp (D)
- Eugene Nida (D)
- Frederick Newmeyer
- Ilse Lehiste (D)
- Janet Dean Fodor
- Joan Bresnan
- Joan Bybee
- Lila R. Gleitman (D)
- Morris Halle (D)
- Ray Jackendoff
- Sandra A. Thompson
- Sarah Thomason
- Walt Wolfram
- William Bright (D)
- William Labov (D)

=== 2007 ===
- Avram Noam Chomsky
- Bernard Comrie
- David Lightfoot
- Larry Hyman
- Laurence Horn
- Lise Menn
- Mark Aronoff
- Paul Kiparsky
- Sandra Chung
- Steven Pinker

=== 2008 ===
- Geoffrey K. Pullum
- Howard Lasnik
- Ivan Sag (D)
- Jay Jasanoff
- Jerrold Sadock
- John Goldsmith
- Judith Aissen
- Marianne Mithun
- Paul Chapin (D)
- Richard S. Kayne
- Sally McConnell-Ginet

=== 2009 ===
- Andrew Garrett
- Bruce Hayes
- Dan Slobin
- Edward L Keenan
- Gregory Ward
- Joan Maling
- Keren Rice
- Michael E. Krauss (D)
- Roger Shuy
- Shana Poplack
- Sheila Blumstein
- Stephen Anderson

=== 2010 ===
- Brian D. Joseph
- Ellen Prince
- John Ohala (D)
- John Rickford
- Mark Liberman
- Peter Culicover
- Stanley Peters
- Susan Goldin-Meadow

=== 2011 ===
- Anthony Kroch (D)
- B Elan Dresher
- Carol Padden
- Diane Lillo-Martin
- James McCloskey
- Joseph E. Aoun
- Mary Beckman
- William Ladusaw

=== 2012 ===
- Alice Harris
- Angelika Kratzer
- Elisabeth Selkirk
- Irene Heim
- Janet Pierrehumbert
- John J. McCarthy
- Jorge Hankamer
- Louis M. Goldstein
- Penelope Eckert
- Richard Meier

=== 2013 ===
- David Pesetsky
- Deborah Tannen
- Dennis Preston
- Edwin Battistella
- Ellen Broselow
- Hans Henrich Hock
- Jane H. Hill (D)
- Johanna Nichols
- Thomas Roeper

=== 2014 ===
- Adele Goldberg
- Beth Levin
- Don Winford
- Gennaro Chierchia
- Hagit Borer
- Lyn Frazier
- Philip Rubin
- Wallace Chafe (D)

=== 2015 ===
- Andries Coetzee
- Bernard Spolsky
- C.-T. James Huang
- Donca Steriade
- Donna Jo Napoli
- Ellen Kaisse
- John Baugh
- Lyle Campbell
- Patricia Keating
- Robin Queen
- Thomas Wasow

=== 2016 ===
- Alan Yu
- Eve V. Clark
- Jonathan Bobaljik
- Kai von Fintel
- Karlos Arregi
- Lisa Green
- Maria Polinsky
- Robert Blust (D)
- Sabine Iatridou
- William Croft

=== 2017 ===
- Anthony C. Woodbury
- Greg Carlson
- Gregory Stump
- Marlyse Baptista
- Nora England
- Sali Tagliamonte

=== 2018 ===
- Patrick Farrell
- Andrew Hippisley
- Colin Phillips
- Gillian Sankoff
- Joe Salmons
- Patrice Beddor
- Rusty Barrett
- Salikoko Mufwene

=== 2019 ===
- Dan Jurafsky
- Heidi Harley
- Karen Emmorey

=== 2020 ===
- Claire Bowern
- Georgia Zellou
- Ives Goddard
- Juliette Blevins
- Mary Bucholtz
- Miriam Meyerhoff
- Monica Macaulay
- Nina Hyams
- Raul Aranovich
- Rena Torres Cacoullos
- Sharon Inkelas

=== 2021 ===
- Anne Lobeck
- Colleen Fitzgerald
- David Beaver
- Graham Thurgood
- Mark Baker
- Megan Crowhurst
- Ricardo Otheguy
- Richard Larson
- Sonja Lanehart

=== 2022 ===
- Anne H. Charity Hudley
- Diane Brentari
- Elizabeth Hume
- Laura Michaelis
- Natalie Schilling
- Pauline Jacobson
- Robert Bayley

=== 2023 ===
- Michel DeGraff
- Ashwini Deo
- Lenore Grenoble
- Ceil Lucas
- William O'Grady
- Eric Potsdam
- Arthur K. Spears
- William S.-Y. Wang

=== 2024 ===
- Ana Arregui
- Lisa Lai-Shen Cheng
- Kristin Denham
- Jeff Good
- Gregory R. Guy
- Kyle Brian Johnson
- Christine Mallinson
- Alec Marantz

=== 2025 ===
- Grant Goodall
- Sun-Ah Jun
- Jeffrey Lidz
- Louise McNally
- Andrea D. Sims
