= West Coast Conference on Formal Linguistics =

The West Coast Conference on Formal Linguistics, or WCCFL (/ˈwɪkfəl/), is an international linguistics conference that is held annually, usually in the spring, at a university in western North America. Research presented there can focus on any aspect of language from a formal perspective, including, but not limited to, phonetics, phonology, morphology, syntax, semantics, and discourse structure. Along with the annual meeting of the North East Linguistics Society (NELS), it is one of two major conferences held in North America that focuses on formal linguistics, with an emphasis, in recent years, on syntactic topics.

== History ==
WCCFL was first held in 1982 at Stanford University. Since then, it has been hosted by universities across the west coast and inland west of the United States and Canada. In 2026, WCCFL was held for the first time in Mexico at the Universidad Nacional Autónoma de México.

Proceedings through WCCFL 17 were published by the Center for the Study of Language and Information (CSLI) at Stanford University; proceedings for WCCFL 18 and after have appeared with Cascadilla Press.

The years in which WCCFL has been held are listed below, together with the host institution and the invited speakers (where this information is available or applicable).

WCCFL #	Year	Location	Invited Speaker (if available)
1	1982	Stanford University	
2	1983	University of Southern California	
3	1984	University of California, Santa Cruz	
4	1985	University of California, Los Angeles	
5	1986	University of Washington	
6	1987	University of Arizona	
7	1988	University of California, Irvine	
8	1989	University of British Columbia	
9	1990	Stanford University	
10	1991	Arizona State University	
11	1992	University of California, Los Angeles	
12	1993	University of California, Santa Cruz	
13	1994	University of California, San Diego	
14	1995	University of Southern California	
15	1996	University of California, Irvine	
16	1997	University of Washington	
17	1998	University of British Columbia	
18	1999	University of Arizona	
19	2000	University of California, Los Angeles	John McCarthy (University of Massachusetts, Amherst); Richard S. Kayne (New York University)
20	2001	University of Southern California	Alec Marantz (Massachusetts Institute of Technology); Alan Prince (Rutgers University)
21	2002	University of California, Santa Cruz	Joe Pater (University of Massachusetts, Amherst); Caroline Heycock (University of Edinburgh); Irene Heim (Massachusetts Institute of Technology)
22	2003	University of California, San Diego	Mary Beckman (Ohio State University); Tom Wasow (Stanford University); Doug Pulleyblank (University of British Columbia)
23	2004	University of California, Davis	Georgia Green (University of Illinois, Urbana-Champaign); Robert Kluender (University of California, San Diego); José Hualde (University of Illinois, Urbana-Champaign)
24	2005	Simon Fraser University	Bruce Hayes (University of California, Los Angeles); Mark Steedman (Edinburgh University); Rose-Marie Déchaine (University of British Columbia)
25	2006	University of Washington	James McCloskey (University of California, Santa Cruz); Maria Polinsky (University of California, San Diego); Douglas Pulleyblank (University of British Columbia)
26	2007	University of California, Berkeley	Adam Albright (Massachusetts Institute of Technology); Lyn Frazier (University of Massachusetts, Amherst); Manfred Krifka (Humboldt-Universität zu Berlin and Zentrum für Allgemeine Sprachwissenschaft)
27	2008	University of California, Los Angeles	Hagit Borer (University of Southern California); Elliott Moreton (University of North Carolina); Liina Pylkkänen (New York University)
28	2010	University of Southern California	Richard S. Kayne (New York University); Sun-Ah Jun (University of California, Los Angeles); David Beaver (University of Texas, Austin); Duane Watson (University of Illinois); Adamantios Gafos (Yale University)
29	2011	University of Arizona	Susanne Gahl (University of California, Berkeley); Norvin Richards (Massachusetts Institute of Technology); Tom Bever (University of Arizona)
30	2012	University of California, Santa Cruz	Jeffrey Lidz (University of Maryland); Christopher Potts (Stanford University); Kie Zuraw (University of California, Los Angeles)
31	2013	Arizona State University	Diana Archangeli (University of Arizona); Hilda Koopman (University of California, Los Angeles); Lisa Matthewson (University of British Columbia)
32	2014	University of Southern California	Sabine Iatridou (Massachusetts Institute of Technology); Jon Sprouse (University of Connecticut); Yael Sharvit (University of California, Los Angeles); Jaye Padgett (University of California, Santa Cruz)
33	2015	Simon Fraser University	Kyle Johnson (University of Massachusetts, Amherst); Heather Goad (McGill University); Matt Wagers (University of California, Santa Cruz)
34	2016	University of Utah	Colin Phillips (University of Maryland); Sam Epstein (University of Michigan); Rachel Walker (University of Southern California)
35	2017	University of Calgary	Elan Dresher (University of Toronto); Heidi Harley (University of Arizona); Keir Moulton (Simon Fraser University); Neil Banerjee (Massachusetts Institute of Technology)
36	2018	University of California, Los Angeles	Vincent Homer (University of Massachusetts, Amherst); Jie Zhang (University of Kansas); Ivy Sichel (University of California, Santa Cruz); Akira Omaki (University of Washington)
37	2019	not held	
38	2020	University of British Columbia	Meg Grant (Simon Fraser University); Jessica Rett (University of California, Los Angeles); Gillian Gallagher (New York University); Maziar Toosarvandani (University of California, Santa Cruz)
39	2021	University of Arizona	Noam Chomsky (University of Arizona); Keren Rice (University of Toronto); Andrew McKenzie (University of Kansas)
40	2022	Stanford University	Line Mikkelsen (University of California, Berkeley); Juliet Stanton (New York University); Guillaume Thomas (University of Toronto)
41	2023	University of California, Santa Cruz	Luke Adamson (Rutgers University); Dorothy Ahn (Rutgers University); Eva Zimmerman (University of Leipzig)
42	2024	University of California, Berkeley	Maria Kouneli (Rutgers University); Will Oxford (University of Manitoba); Sharon Rose (University of California, San Diego); Yimei Xiang (Rutgers University)
43	2025	University of Washington	Kathryn Davidson (Harvard); Henry Davis (University of British Columbia); Meghan Sumner (Stanford University)
44	2026	Universidad Nacional Autónoma de México	Wendy L. A. López Márquez (University of California, Berkeley); Adela Covarrubias (Instituto Nacional de Antropología e Historia); Jesse Harris (University of California, Los Angeles); Fidel Hernández (Escuela Nacional de Antropología e Historia)
45	2027	??	TBD
46	2028	??	TBD
