= Ashwini Deo =

Indian linguist

Ashwini Deo is a linguist who specializes in semantics, pragmatics, and language variation and change, with an empirical focus on the Indo-Aryan languages. She is currently Professor of Linguistics at the University of Texas at Austin.

== Career ==
In 1999, Deo obtained master's degrees in Sanskrit Grammar from Tilak Maharashtra Vidyapeeth and in linguistics from Deccan College Post-Graduate and Research Institute. Both institutions are located in Pune, India. Deo received her Ph.D. in linguistics from Stanford University in 2006 with a dissertation entitled Tense and Aspect in Indo-Aryan Languages: Variation and Diachrony.

Deo has held faculty positions at different U.S. universities. She was Assistant Professor (2007–2013) and Associate Professor of linguistics (2013–2016) at Yale University. She continued her career as Associate Professor (2016–2021) and Professor of Linguistics (2021–2022) at Ohio State University. Since 2022, Deo has held her current position at the University of Texas at Austin while also holding an adjunct professor position at Ohio State University.

Deo was editor of the Historical Section of Language and Linguistics Compass (2008–2014) and Associate Editor of Linguistics and Philosophy (2019–2021) and Natural Language & Linguistic Theory (2019–2022). Deo has also served as a member of the editorial board of Transactions of the Philological Society, Semantics and Pragmatics, and the Journal of South Asian Linguistics.

== Awards and honors ==
In 2012, Deo was one of the co-Principal Investigators of The underpinnings of Semantic change: A Linguistic, Cognitive, and Information-Theoretic Investigation. The project received a National Science Foundation INSPIRE award.

In 2013, Deo received a National Science Foundation’s CAREER grant to conduct research on the evolution of the semantic systems of tense, aspect, and modality in historical Indo-Aryan and synchronic Bhili languages. The project received a second CAREER award in 2016.

In 2023, Deo was inducted as a Fellow of the Linguistic Society of America.

== Selected publications ==
- Zhang, M., M. Piñango, and A. Deo. 2022. Word-meaning variation in English have-sentences: The impact of cognitive versus social factors on individuals' linguistic context-sensitivity. Language 98.1: 123–156.
- Deo, A. 2015. Diachronic semantics. Annual Review of Linguistics 1: 179–197.
- Deo, A. 2015. The semantic and pragmatic underpinnings of grammaticalization paths: The progressive to imperfective shift. Semantics & Pragmatics 8.14: 1–52.
- Deo, A. 2014. Formal semantics/pragmatics and language change. In The Routledge handbook of historical linguistics. Edited by C. Bowern and B. Evans. Oxford, UK: Routledge, 393–409.
- Condoravdi, C. and A. Deo. 2014. Aspect shifts in Indo-Aryan and trajectories of semantic change. In Language change at the Syntax-Semantics Interface. Edited by C. Gianollo, A. Jäger, and D. Penka. Berlin: Mouton de Gruyter, 261–92.
- Deo, A. and M. Piñango. Quantification and Context in Measure Adverbs. Proceedings of SALT 21: 295–312.
- Deo, A. 2009. Unifying the imperfective and the progressive: Partitions as quantificational domains. Linguistics and Philosophy 32.5: 475–521.
- Deo, A. 2007. The metrical organization of Classical Sanskrit verse. Journal of Linguistics 43.1: 63–114.
- Bresnan, J., A. Deo, and D. Sharma. 2006. Typology and variation: A probabilistic approach to be and n’t in the Survey of English Dialects. English Language and Linguistics 11: 301–346.
