= Sonja L. Lanehart =

American linguist

- Pronunciation: /ˈsɒndʒə ˈleɪnhɑːrt/
- Born: November 4, 1966 (age 59)
- Education: University of Texas at Austin (B.A.) University of Michigan (M.A., Ph.D.)
- Employer(s): University of Arizona, 2019–present
- Known for: Research and publication in African American language use
- Family: Paul (spouse), Isaac (son)
- Website: sonjallanehart.com

Sonja L. Lanehart (/ˈsɒndʒə ˈleɪnhɑːrt/; born November 4, 1966) is an American linguist and professor of linguistics in the College of Social and Behavioral Sciences at the University of Arizona who has advanced the study of language use in the African American community. Her work as a researcher, author, and editor includes African American English, education, literacy, identity, language variation, women's languages, intersectionality, and inclusivity within the African American community. Lanehart's sociolinguistic orientation prioritizes language as a phenomenon influenced by sociocultural and historical factors. She also utilizes the perspectives of Critical Race Theory and Black feminism in her work. Lanehart was the Brackenridge Endowed Chair in Literature and Humanities at the University of Texas at San Antonio from 2006 to 2019, and was selected by the Linguistic Society of America as a 2021 Fellow.

== Life and career ==
=== Early life and family ===
Lanehart was born on November 4, 1966, in the town of Picard in the Southern United States, where she lived until leaving to attend graduate school in Michigan. Until sixth grade, she lived in a Black, working-class neighborhood and attended a magnet school; her family then moved, and Lanehart went to a more integrated middle and high school. She describes her family as "middle-class."

Lanehart cites her family as having a significant influence on her studies. Her book Sista, Speak! (2002) presents the narratives of five African American women all immediately related to Lanehart (including Lanehart, herself). Their struggles with literacy, due to a lack of education and opportunity, motivated her to create an outlet in which their stories could be told, and so she prioritizes supporting those closest to her through her work. Lanehart also acknowledges her husband, Paul, and her son, Isaac, as significant people in her life.

=== Higher education and career ===
For her bachelor's degree, Lanehart attended the University of Texas at Austin and majored in English with a minor in Educational Psychology. After graduating in 1990, she continued on to receive her master's from the University of Michigan in 1991 with a degree in English Language Literature, specifically in Medieval Studies. Remaining at the University of Michigan, she obtained her Ph.D. in 1995 in English Language and Literature.

While working towards her Ph.D., Lanehart was a graduate student teaching assistant from 1992 to 1993 at the University of Michigan. She then joined the faculty of the University of Georgia as an assistant professor of English Language Studies and Linguistics from 1995 to 2002, and was promoted to associate professor in 2002. In 2006, Lanehart moved to the University of Texas at San Antonio as the Brackenridge Endowed Chair in Literature and Humanities. She remained in that position until 2019 when she joined the faculty of the University of Arizona as a professor of Linguistics and Faculty Fellow in the Graduate College, with a concurrent position in the Teaching, Learning, and Sociocultural Studies program.

== Major works ==
=== Sociocultural and Historical Contexts of African American English (2001) ===
On September 29–30, 1998, Lanehart facilitated a two-day conference called "AAEV State of the Art Conference" at the University of Georgia, where she was affiliated at the time as an assistant professor of English Language Studies and Linguistics. Various linguists, (Note: All of the contributors include Guy Bailey, John Baugh, Patricia Cukor-Avila, Michele Foster, William Labov, Sonja Lanehart, Marcyliena Morgan, Salikoko S. Mufwene, Geneva Smitherman, Arthur K. Spears, David Sutcliffe, Denise Troutman, Walt Wolfram, Toya A. Wyatt, Mary B. Zeigler. John McWhorter and John Rickford also presented at the conference, but their work is not included in the book.) including William Labov and Geneva Smitherman, were invited to present their work. Lanehart then compiled and edited the presentations as Sociocultural and Historical Contexts of African American English (2001). The book is divided into five parts with fourteen chapters total, each chapter being authored by a different scholar who participated in the panel.

Lanehart was responsible for writing the acknowledgements section and a chapter in the introduction titled "State of the art in African American English research: Multi-disciplinary perspectives and directions," in which she promotes the importance of the book as well as summarizes each chapter. In the introduction, Lanehart explains the central goals of the conference: to increase scholarly understanding on how African American English is used within a speech community; to place African American English in a global context to allow comparison among other languages; and to more broadly highlight the significance of language use in other linguistic groups. She also posed a set of questions to the panelists regarding the relationship of African American English to other languages and its role in education, family, and community. At the core of these ten points of inquiry was, "What is African American English?" The editor asked these not with the expectation that they be answered, but to lay a foundation for future conferences on African American English as a guide to measure progress in the field.

Lanehart's text prioritizes the language as a sociocultural and historical phenomenon, stating that the two "are fundamental aspects of the nature and continued existence of African American English as well as, for example, identity, self-efficacy, resilience, motivation, goals, and possible selves." She also stresses the need for increased research in the field of sociolinguistics, specifically, for studies that include multiple generations and ones that focus on identity. Further, Lanehart expresses her belief that research on African American English must be more accessible to the public so that those outside of the academic sphere can utilize it in responding to educational and social concerns. This could mean, for instance, tailoring second-dialect instruction in the classroom to speakers of different varieties of African American English.

=== Sista, Speak! Black Women Kinfolk Talk About Language and Literacy (2002) ===
In her book Sista, Speak!, Lanehart tells the narratives of five African American women in her family across three generations: Maya, her grandmother; Grace, her mother; Reia, her aunt; Deidra, her sister; and Sonja, herself. Through her research, she aims to answer the question, "What are the language and literacy attitudes, practices, and ideologies of my participants?" Lanehart discusses the influence of race, education, community, and language prestige on these specific women's speech practices and on African American language overall. Lanehart argues that the notion of a "standard," and therefore "correct," English does not exist, so labeling African American English as inferior is baseless. For example, one of the syntactic features of African American English that Lanehart identifies in the narratives is negative concord, or double negative, exhibited in the sentence, "I don't want nobody doing that." Negative concord is a widely used and legitimate feature of African American English, while speakers of Standard English would consider the sentence to be incorrect. She states that African American English itself is not flawed, but that the culture that criticizes it is. One of Lanehart's goals for the book is to instigate self-reflection. She expresses that her incentive to write came from a desire to answer childhood questions about African American women, language, and literacy. Readers must "study" themselves and their contexts of interactions to understand the role of sociocultural and sociohistorical factors in building identity.

Sista, Speak! is divided into two parts, each containing six chapters. Part One begins with Lanehart describing her motivations for writing the book, and then presents all of the five narratives. To gather her data, she conducted individual oral interviews in which she asked each participant to respond to quotations about African American English versus "standard" English. She also compiled written data by collecting their essays, letters, and creative writing pieces. The narratives communicate the background, education, language, literacy, and individual goals of each woman. Part Two provides a scholarly analysis of each of these elements (background, education, language, literacy, and individual goals), updates the reader on the women's lives five years after the data was collected, and explains the consequences of the research. By using self-narratives as her form of data, Lanehart exemplifies the interconnectedness of language, identity, and culture, further solidifying the book's sociolinguistic orientation.

Lanehart concludes with a discussion on the status of non-standard, minority dialects, accents, and languages in the United States. She cites linguistic prejudice as an enduring issue that has contributed to social and educational discrepancies, specifically between Black and white Americans. In order to overcome these inequalities, Lanehart states that society must purge the idea of a "proper" language, and instead, recognize a non-hierarchical range of linguistic diversity.

In 2004, Debra Goodman, Professor of Specialized Programs in Education at Hofstra University, and Yetta M. Goodman, Regents Professor of Education at the University of Arizona, published a review of Sista, Speak! in Language in Society (33:3, 2004). Goodman and Goodman commend Lanehart for providing a platform on which African American women's voices and stories can be heard. They focus on her message that there is not one "correct" form of English, but rather, that language is bound to culture and so manifests in many varieties. They state that educators, therefore, must be cognizant of the linguistic biases that create a problematic academic environment for students who do not speak Standard English. According to the reviewers, "The beliefs and language policies of teachers, materials, programs, and schools cannot be separated from language learning," and these influences then extend into communities to have significant consequences. Goodman and Goodman endorse Lanehart's idea of the interconnectedness of language and identity while adding the perspective of its implications in education.

=== African American Women's Language: Discourse, Education, and Identity (2009) ===
African American Women's Language: Discourse, Education, and Identity (2009), or AAWL, was published after the 2008 conference "African American Women's Language" hosted by Lanehart in San Antonio, Texas. The presentations by various scholars, (Note: All of the scholars included in the book are Grisel Y. Acosta, Jennifer Bloomquist, Tracy Conner, Charles E. Debose, Jessica T. DeCuir-Gunby, Adrienne D. Dixson, Shelome Gooden, Lisa Green, Lanita Jacobs-Huey, Peggy Jones, Tyler Kendall, Sonja L. Lanehart, Christine Mallinson, Terry Meier, Joycelyn Moody, Iyabo F. Osiapem, Calaya Reid, Elaine Richardson, Tani D. Sanchez, Arthur K. Spears, Alicia Beckford Wassink. Not all of the presentations from the conference were included in the book.) including Lisa Green and Arthur K. Spears, were compiled and edited by Lanehart. She also wrote the introduction. AAWL is made up of four parts with 17 chapters total, each chapter being authored or co-authored by the presenters.

Part 1 ("Language and Identity") concentrates on the relationship between language and identity, as well as on the societal, cultural, and historical background of African American women's language; Part 2 ("Discourse, Grammar, and Variation") offers a more specific analysis of the structure, discourse, grammar, variation, and use of African American women's language in different contexts; Part 3 ("Film and Literature") discusses how African American women's language—and, consequently, the women themselves—is portrayed in both contemporary and historical literature and film; and Part 4 ("Performance and Community") examines the ways a speaker performs linguistically and the particular environments in the African American community where African American women's language is employed.

Lanehart defines African American women's language as, "The language spoken by African American women," and expresses that one of her main goals is to demonstrate the importance of the language in holistic contexts, not just as data or a set of features. She wants the reader to be left with an understanding of: the diversity of African American language and African American women's language throughout the Americas, the varying perceptions of the language within the African American community itself, and how factors like age and context influence its use. She concludes her introductory section by stating that although research on African American women's language is meager, this is not indicative of the importance of African American women's role in history, and she hopes AAWL will serve as a foundation for future research.

=== The Oxford Handbook of African American Language (2015) ===
Lanehart edited The Oxford Handbook of African American Language (2015), or OHAAL, a research text on language use in African American communities containing seven parts with forty-eight chapters total. The parts appear in the order as follows: "Origins and Historical Perspectives," "Lects and Variations," "Structure and Description," "Child Language Acquisition and Development," "Education," "Language in Society," and "Language and Identity." The chapters are authored by various scholars (Note: All of the contributors include H. Samy Alim, Kate T. Anderson, Guy Bailey, Bettina Baker, John Baugh, Robert Bayley, Renée A. Blake, Jennifer Bloomquist, Erica Britt, Tamara Butler, Tempii B. Champion, Patricia Cukor-Avila, Charles E. Debose, Evangelos Evangelou, Sabriya Fisher, Jamila Gillenwaters, Shelome Gooden, Lisa J. Green, Randall Hendrick, Joseph Hill, Sharroky Hollie, Ramonda Horton, David E. Kirkland, Mary E. Kohn, William A. Kretzschmar, Jr., William Labov, Ceil Lucas, Ayesha M. Malik, Allyssa McCabe, Carolyn McCaskill, Monique T. Mills, Simanique Moody, Marcyliena Morgan, Salikoko S. Mufwene, Brandi L. Newkirk-Turner, Luiza Newlin-Łukowicz, Janna B. Oetting, James Braxton Peterson, Jacquelyn Rahman, Howard Rambsy II, John R. Rickford, Tyson L. Rose, Edgar W. Schneider, Cara Shousterman, John Victor Singler, Walter Sistrunk, Richard L. Smith, Geneva Smitherman, Arthur K. Spears, Ida J. Stockman, J. Michael Terry, Erik R. Thomas, K. C. Nat Turner, Gerard Van Herk, Janneke Van Hofwegen, James A. Walker, Julie A. Washington, Tracey L. Weldon, Jessica White-Sustaíta, Briana Whiteside, Rose Wilkerson, Donald Winford, Walt Wolfram, and Toya A. Wyatt) in the field, including John R. Rickford and Salikoko S. Mufwene. In addition to her role as editor, Lanehart co-authored the introduction with Ayesha M. Malik and wrote a chapter titled "African American Language and Identity: Contradictions and Conundrums" in the section "Language and Identity."

The introduction discusses how the study of African American English has developed since the 1990s to encompass a broader range of topics, both within linguistics as well as in other fields. Examples include research in education policies, on African American women's language, on child language acquisition, in anthropology, in sociology, among others. Lanehart and Malik also state the goal of the book, that being to collectively display contemporary and traditional research on African American language from a range of scholarly perspectives with a broad readership in mind. They believe collaboration and dialogue to be important in furthering the inquiry into and knowledge of African American English, and so OHAAL serves as a tool for future academic work to be more effectively executed.

"African American Language and Identity: Contradictions and Conundrums" is subdivided into five sections with 15 pages total. Lanehart states that her goal for the chapter is to "define and discuss difficult terms related to language and identity in African American communities" through examination of linguistic attitudes and beliefs. She forefronts the interconnectedness of language with identity and culture, as well as the topic of a "standard" or "correct" form of English which she rejects. She discusses her own experiences with prejudice against her use of African American English and how the stigma has resulted in shame and denial among many members of this language community. Contrastively, Lanehart also describes pride and acceptance of African American English. Some speakers, such as Toni Morrison, who is cited, refuse to be linguistically disparaged for the perceived inferiority of their language. They instead take pride in how African American English (and other non-standard varieties for similarly derided linguistic groups) overtly demonstrates their black community, history, and identification. Lanehart explains how African American English derives from the unique experiences of its speakers, and that the way it manifests depends on the individual's perception of how they fit into the world around them.

Lanehart ends the chapter with two major conclusions. Firstly, that there is a conflict between African American language and the language of society and education, that is, Standard English. Secondly, that African Americans will not succumb to the hostile forces that try to belittle and eradicate their language. According to Lanehart, African American English is the language of a community that has endured immense oppression, making its use entitled only to those within the group. Its speakers, therefore, will continue to persevere in the face of linguistic discrimination.

The OHAAL received a largely positive response. Jessica Grieser, an assistant professor in rhetoric, Writing, and Linguistics at the University of Tennessee, praised the book for its comprehensiveness in the academic journal Language in Society (45:5, 2016). She highlighted its effectiveness in including both long-standing issues in the field as well as contemporary research to push the boundaries of African American linguistic study. Grieser commented that some of the authors did not demonstrate a full understanding of every detail in their subfield, but that this was remedied by the breadth of topics discussed and by the book's appeal to many different audiences. She states that the OHAAL makes an "indelible contribution" to the study of African American speech communities, and "[recognizes] the multiplicity and the richness of the African American Language."

Anne H. Charity Hudley, Professor of Linguistics at the University of California Santa Barbara, offered her review of the OHAAL in the Journal of Sociolinguistics (21:2, 2017). Charity Hudley also praised the book for being comprehensive and for allowing the voices of both established and new scholars in the field to be heard. She commented that the variety of methodologies represented through the diverse authorship allows readers to understand the developments in the study of African American language within linguistics and in African American studies more generally. Charity Hudley stated one of the biggest shortcomings of the OHAAL to be "the lack of big picture perspectives in the individual chapters," along with it leaving unanswered questions relating to the implications for African American culture as a whole. According to the reviewer, the chapters would have been more effective by prioritizing a broader contextual analysis over specific studies. Charity Hudley finishes by commending the authors, and names Lanehart, specifically, for their thorough and inclusive work.

=== "Talking Black in America" (2017) and "Signing Black in America: The Story of Black ASL" (2020) ===
The documentary "Talking Black in America," created by Walt Wolfram, examines African American English by focusing on the experiences of everyday people. With insight from educators, linguists, and historians, the film intends to demonstrate the significance of African American English in the United States. It was filmed in various locations across the country to showcase the different regional dialects within the one language. The film focuses on the development of African American English into various dialects, its influence on Standard American English, the African American civil rights struggle, and the impact of other historical and contemporary dialects on modern African American English.

"Signing Black in America: The Story of Black ASL" is part of a miniseries that followed the release of "Talking Black in America." It is the first documentary to focus on the dialect of American Sign Language known as Black ASL. Because of historical segregation, the speakers of Black ASL exhibit features that make their language distinct from the standard. These include hand movement and positioning, location of a gesture, and facial expressions. One interpreter explains that Black ASL preserves older, more traditional forms of the language. For example, two-handed signs, such as "want," "don't know," and "tired," often become one-handed in White ASL conversation, while Black ASL users maintain the use of both hands to form these signs. Through its sociocultural linguistic orientation, the film demonstrates the role that Black ASL plays in forming identity and creating solidarity among members of the Black Deaf community.

Lanehart worked as an associate producer for both documentaries; she was one of twelve in "Talking Black in America" and one of fourteen in "Signing Black in America: The Story of Black ASL." She and her colleagues formed a team of linguists, and Lanehart was among familiar scholars such as Arthur K. Spears and Lisa Green.

== Committees and organizations ==
=== American Dialect Society ===
Lanehart has been a member of the American Dialect Society since 1998. She has worked as a Proposal Reviewer (as of March 2020), is on the Nominating Committee for a four-year term that began in 2019, and has a position on the Editorial Advising Committee from 2021 to 2023. Lanehart has presented and spoken at various American Dialect Society symposiums, such as on January 2–5, 2020 for the "Unapologetically Black Language, Linguists, and Linguistics" conference in New Orleans, Louisiana, where she was the Invited Presidential Address Speaker.

=== Linguistic Society of America ===
Lanehart began her involvement with The Linguistic Society of America (LSA) as a graduate student at the University of Michigan, and has had several roles within the organization, including as a presenter, an event organizer, and a chair. She became more involved in the society while at the University of Georgia as an associate professor of English Language Studies and Linguistics. She co-chaired the Committee on Ethnic Diversity in Linguistics for several years, and continues to be involved in that sector of the LSA. The LSA named Lanehart a 2021 Fellow, one of nine chosen for the year's class. Fellows are "Members of the Society who have made distinguished contributions to the discipline" which may include "scholarly excellence, service to the LSA, service to speech communities, teaching and mentoring excellence" among others. In 2025 she received the LSA's mentoring award.

=== Brackenridge Endowed Chair ===
In 2006, the University of Texas at San Antonio's College of Liberal and Fine Arts named Lanehart as the Brackenridge Endowed Chair in Literature and Humanities, a title she held until 2019. The George W. Brackenridge Foundation was established in 1920 to provide financial support to students in Texas public schools and charter schools, as well as to those pursuing higher education. With the finances from this grant, Lanehart distributed funds to her students, attended linguistic conventions, and organized academic conferences (such as the one that led to the publication of African American Women's Language (2009)). The funding also contributed to the publication of The Oxford Handbook African American Language (2015) through the hiring of a copy-editor, an indexer, and research assistants.

== Modern scholars' assessments ==
=== Citation of Lanehart's major works ===
Lanehart's work has been cited by other sociolinguistic scholars, such as in Ronald Wardhaugh's An Introduction to Sociolinguistics (2011) and in Miriam Meyerhoff's Introducing Sociolinguistics (2018), who utilized Sociocultural and Historical Contexts of African American Language (2001) and The Oxford Handbook of African American Language (2005), respectively. Lanehart's texts have also been applied in the context of linguistic prejudice and of education. To name a few, in Black Linguistics: Language, Society, and Politics in Africa and the Americas (2003), Lanehart's Sista, Speak! (2001) is cited in the chapter "Linguistic Profiling" by John Baugh; John Edwards' Language Diversity in the Classroom (2009) cites The Oxford Handbook of African American Language (2005); and the article "Why Study the U.S. South? The Nexus of Race and Place in Investigating Black Student Achievement" in SAGE Journals (38:1, 2009) uses material from Sociocultural and Historical Contexts of African American Language (2001).

=== Kirk Hazen's review on Sociocultural and Historical Contexts of African American English (2001) ===
Several years after its publication, Lanehart's book Sociocultural and Historical Contexts of African American English (2001) ignited a controversy. In 2003, West Virginia University linguistics professor Kirk Hazen published a review in the academic journal American Speech (78:1, 2003) summarizing, commenting on, and critiquing each chapter. According to Hazen, there are certain problematic aspects of the book, including having unclear terminology such as "creole-like" and "language of thought," focusing mainly on the language of African American English and not on the "sociocultural and historical contexts for it," and only using empirical data in one subsection. Additionally, Hazen comments on Lanehart's introduction section in which she addresses the ten questions she posed to the presenters. In this chapter, Lanehart acknowledges that all of the questions "were not resolved nor were they expected to be," to which Hazen responds that the authors "[were] given impossible tasks."

A year later, Geneva Smitherman and Arthur K. Spears published "Response to Kirk Hazen's Review of Sonja L. Lanehart's Sociocultural and Historical Contexts of African American English" in American Speech (79, 2004). Spears, Professor of Linguistics and Anthropology at The City University of New York, and Smitherman, retired Professor and Director of the African American Language and Literacy Program at Michigan State University, each contributed a chapter to Lanehart's book. They assess and rebut each of Hazen's criticisms individually.

Firstly, Spears and Smitherman state that "creole-like" is actually an unambiguous term, and then provide a definition for it. Hazen also criticized several of the authors' use of the phrase "language of thought" to describe AAE, to which Smitherman and Spears respond that "the literature on language and education is replete with references to 'the language of thought.'" Secondly, the existence of historical linguistics and sociolinguistics signifies that Hazen's second claim is unfounded since sociocultural contexts of language are embedded within a language itself. Therefore, a separate chapter specifically by sociologists or historians would be unnecessary. Thirdly, Smitherman and Spears address Hazen's objection that empirical data is lacking by saying that this is a "woeful misunderstanding—or a woefully limited one—of what empirical research is." The author (Note: The author is Guy Bailey, who wrote the chapter "The relationship between African American Vernacular English and White Vernaculars in the American South: A sociocultural history and some phonological evidence.") that Hazen mentioned as being the only one to have empirical data included statistics in his chapter, so the scholars refute Hazen's notion that empirical data is exclusively quantitative.

Hazen evaluates each chapter individually and assesses the overall legitimacy of the text, and Smitherman and Spears counter every one of Hazen's criticisms while offering insight as participants of the conference. The specialties of the involved scholars vary: Hazen has focused his work on variation in Appalachian English, Spears has concentrated largely on pidgins and creoles, and Smitherman pursued African American education and literacy before retiring. They do all converge, however, through their work in sociolinguistics as a whole.

In this same year, Hazen published a brief reply to Smitherman and Spears' response in American Speech (79, 2004). He begins by clarifying the purpose of a book review: to motivate the audience to read the book, to provoke meaningful thought about the book by considering the reviewer's comments, and to improve overall knowledge on the topic. Because Sociocultural and Historical Contexts of African American English (2001) is an extensive text with input from many scholars, Hazen explains that writing a review allowed him to reflect on how developed research on African American English was at the time. Although he presented "critiques" in the review, he did not aim to "establish criticisms." Hazen finishes by returning to Smitherman and Spears, citing them as "respected elders" in the field. The differences in opinion of the parties, he explains, are natural, are indicative of the varying backgrounds and orientations in linguistics, and are essential to progressing scholarship.

== Selected publications ==
=== Book chapters ===
- Lanehart, Sonja L. "African American Vernacular English." The Handbook of Language and Ethnic Identity. Ed. Joshua Fishman. New York: Oxford University Press, 1999: 211–225.
- Lanehart, Sonja L. "If Our Children Are Our Future, Why Are We Stuck in the Past?: Beyond the Anglicists and the Creolists, and Toward Social Change." In Talkin' Black Talk: Language, Education, and Social Change. Eds. H. Samy Alim and John Baugh. New York: Teachers College Press, 2007: 132–141.
- Kretzschmar, William A., Sonja L. Lanehart, Bridget Anderson, and Rebecca Childs. "The Relevance of Community Language Studies to HEL: The View from Roswell." In Studies in the History of the English Language III. Eds. Christopher M. Cain and Geoffrey Russom. Berlin: Mouton de Gruyter, 2007: 173–186.
- Lanehart, Sonja L. "African American Language." The Handbook of Language and Ethnic Identity, 2nd ed. Eds. Joshua Fishman and Ofelia Garcia. New York: Oxford University Press, 2010: 340–352.
- Lanehart, Sonja L. "To Continue Moving Forward in English Language and Linguistics Research in the Twenty-First Century." Contours of English and English Language Studies. Eds. Michael Adams and Anne Curzan. Ann Arbor: University of Michigan Press, 2011: 71–81.
- Lanehart, Sonja L. "Re-viewing the Origins and History of African American Language." In English Historical Linguistics: An International Handbook, Volume 2 (HSK 34.2). Eds. Alexander Bergs and Laurel J. Brinton. Berlin: Mouton de Gruyter, 2012: 1826–1839.
- Lanehart, Sonja L. "How Is HEL Relevant to Me?" In Approaches to Teaching the History of the English Language: Pedagogy in Practice. Eds. Mary Hayes and Allison Burkette. Oxford: Oxford University Press, 2017: 41–56.
- Lanehart, Sonja L. and Ayesha M. Malik. "Black Is, Black Isn't: Perceptions of Language and Blackness." In Language Variety in the New South: Contemporary Perspectives on Change and Variation. Eds. Jeffrey Reaser, Eric Wilbanks, Karissa Wojcik, and Walt Wolfram. Chapel Hill, NC: University of North Carolina Press, 2018: 203–222.
- Lanehart, Sonja L. "Re-viewing the Origins and History of African American Language." In English Historical Linguistics: An International Handbook, 2nd edition. Eds. Alexander Bergs and Laurel J. Brinton. Berlin: Mouton de Gruyter, 2018: 80–95.
- Lanehart, Sonja L. "Can You Hear (and See) Me Now?: Race-ing American Language Variationist/Change and Sociolinguistic Research Methodologies." In Understanding Critical Race Research Methods and Methodologies: Lessons from the Field. Eds. Jessica DeCuir-Gunby, Thandeka Chapman, and Paul A. Schutz. New York and London: Routledge, 2019: 34–47.
- Lanehart, Sonja L. "'I, Too, Am America': AAL, #BlackLivesMatter, and Social Justice Activism in Sociolinguistics." In The Routledge Companion to the Work of John R. Rickford. Eds. Renée Blake and Isabelle Buchstaller. London and New York: Routledge, 2020: 452–460.

=== Journal articles ===
- Schutz, Paul A. and Sonja L. Lanehart. "Long-term Educational Goals, Subgoals, Learning Strategies Use and the Academic Performance of College Students." Learning and Individual Differences 6.4 (1994): 399–412.
- Lanehart, Sonja L. "The Language of Identity." Journal of English Linguistics 24.4 (1996): 322- 331.
- Lanehart, Sonja L. "Our Language, Our Selves." Journal of Commonwealth and Postcolonial Studies 4.1 (1996): 24–36.
- Lanehart, Sonja L. "African American Vernacular English in Education: The Dynamics of Pedagogy, Ideology, and Identity." Journal of English Linguistics 26.2 (1998): 122–136.
- Schutz, Paul A., Vicky White, and Sonja L. Lanehart. "Core Goals and Their Relationship to Semester Subgoals and Academic Performance." Journal of College Student Retention: Research, Theory, and Practice 2.1 (2000): 13–28.
- Lanehart, Sonja L. and Paul A. Schutz. "Facilitating Self-regulation in Linguistics Classrooms." Academic Exchange Quarterly 5.3 (2001): 83–87.
- Lanehart, Sonja L. "Goals and Teaching English Language Classes." Journal of English Linguistics on Teaching American English 30.4 (December 2002): 328–338.
- Lanehart, Sonja L. "Diversity and Intersectionality." Texas Linguistic Forum 53 (2009): 1–8.
