= Lisa Green =

Lisa Green may refer to:

- Lisa Green (tennis) (born 1968), American tennis player
- Lisa Gould (born 1967), married name Green, British tennis player
- Lisa Green (linguist), linguist specializing in syntax and African American English
