= Ana Arregui =

American linguist

- Education: University of Massachusetts, Amherst
- Scientific career
- Fields: Linguistics

Ana Arregui is a linguist and professor in the Department of Linguistics at the University of Massachusetts Amherst. Her research in formal semantics addresses phenomena including modality, tense, aspect, pronouns and indefinites.

== Biography ==
Arregui is from Buenos Aires, Argentina.

She graduated from UMass Amherst in 2005 with a dissertation titled "On the accessibility of possible worlds: the role of tense and aspect". Her committee was chaired by Angelika Kratzer. Arregui joined UMass Amherst in 2019 as faculty in semantics. Before that, she was on the faculty of the University of Ottawa.

In 2023, Arregui was co-director of the Linguistic Society of America Summer Institute along with Kyle Johnson.

== Awards ==
In 2024, Arregui was inducted as a Fellow of the Linguistic Society of America.

== Selected publications ==
- Arregui, Ana (1 June 2009). "On similarity in counterfactuals". Linguistics and Philosophy. 32 (3): 245–278. doi:10.1007/s10988-009-9060-7. ISSN 1573-0549.
- Arregui, Ana; Rivero, María Luisa; Salanova, Andrés (1 May 2014). "Cross-linguistic variation in imperfectivity". Natural Language & Linguistic Theory. 32 (2): 307–362. doi:10.1007/s11049-013-9226-4. ISSN 1573-0859.
- Arregui, Ana (1 September 2007). "When aspect matters: the case of would-conditionals". Natural Language Semantics. 15 (3): 221–264. doi:10.1007/s11050-007-9019-6. ISSN 1572-865X.
- Arregui, Ana; Clifton, Charles; Frazier, Lyn; Moulton, Keir (1 August 2006). "Processing elided verb phrases with flawed antecedents: The recycling hypothesis". Journal of Memory and Language. 55 (2): 232–246. doi:10.1016/J.JML.2006.02.005. PMC 1948839. PMID 17710192.
