= Root (linguistics) =

Lexical core of a word without affixes

A root (also known as a root word or radical) is the core of a word that is irreducible into more meaningful elements. In morphology, a root is a morphologically simple unit which can be left bare or to which a prefix or a suffix can attach. The root word is the primary lexical unit of a word, and of a word family (this root is then called the base word), which carries aspects of semantic content and cannot be reduced into smaller constituents. Content words in nearly all languages contain, and may consist only of, root morphemes. However, sometimes the term "root" is also used to describe the word without its inflectional endings, but with its lexical endings in place. For example, chatters has the inflectional root or lemma chatter, but the lexical root chat. Inflectional roots are often called stems. A root, or a root morpheme, in the stricter sense, is a mono-morphemic stem.

The traditional definition allows roots to be either free morphemes or bound morphemes. Root morphemes are the building blocks for affixation and compounds. However, in polysynthetic languages with very high levels of inflectional morphology, the term "root" is generally synonymous with "free morpheme". Many languages have a very restricted number of morphemes that can stand alone as a word: Yup'ik, for instance, has no more than two thousand.

Roots are sometimes notated using the radical symbol ⟨√⟩ to avoid potential conflation with other objects of analysis with similar spellings or pronunciation: for instance, √bhū- specifically denotes the Sanskrit root bhū-.

== Examples ==
English verb form running contains the root run. The Spanish superlative adjective amplísimo contains the root ampli-. In the former case, the root can occur on its own freely. In the latter, modification via affixation is required to be used as a free form. English has minimal use of morphological strategies such as affixation and features a tendency to have words that are identical to their roots. However, such forms as in Spanish exist in English such as interrupt, which may arguably contain the root -rupt, which only appears in other related prefixed forms (such as disrupt, corrupt, rupture, etc.). The form -rupt cannot occur on its own.

Examples of consonantal roots, which are related but distinct to the concept developed here, are formed prototypically by three (as few as two and as many as five) consonants. Speakers may derive and develop new words (morphosyntactically distinct, i.e. with different parts of speech) by using non-concatenative morphological strategies: inserting different vowels. Unlike 'root' here, these cannot occur on their own without modification; as such these are never actually observed in speech and may be termed 'abstract'. For example, in Hebrew, the forms derived from the abstract consonantal roots, a major Hebrew phonetics concept ג-ד-ל (g-d-l) related to ideas of largeness: gadol and gdola (masculine and feminine forms of the adjective "big"), gadal "he grew", higdil "he magnified" and magdelet "magnifier", along with many other words such as godel "size" and migdal "tower".

Roots and reconstructed roots can become the tools of etymology.

== Secondary roots ==
Secondary roots are roots with changes in them, producing a new word with a slightly different meaning. In English, a rough equivalent would be to see a conductor as a secondary root formed from the root to conduct. In abjad languages, the most familiar are Arabic and Hebrew, in which families of secondary roots are fundamental to the language, secondary roots are created by changes in the roots' vowels, by adding or removing the long vowels a, i, u, e and o. (Notice that Arabic does not have the vowels e and o.) In addition, secondary roots can be created by prefixing (m−, t−), infixing (−t−), or suffixing (−i, and several others). There is no rule in these languages on how many secondary roots can be derived from a single root; some roots have few, but others have many, not all of which are necessarily in current use.

Consider the Arabic language:

- مركز [mrkz] or [markaza] meaning 'centralized (masculine, singular)', from [markaz] 'centre', from [rakaza] 'plant into the earth, stick up (a lance)' ( ر-ك-ز | r-k-z). This in turn has derived words مركزي [markaziy], meaning 'central', مركزية [markaziy:ah], meaning 'centralism' or 'centralization', and لامركزية, [la:markaziy:ah] 'decentralization'.
- أرجح [rjh] or [ta'arjaħa] meaning 'oscillated (masculine, singular)', from ['urju:ħa] 'swing (n)', from [rajaħa] 'weighed down, preponderated (masculine, singular)' ( ر-ج-ح | r-j-ħ).
- محور [mhwr] or [tamaħwara] meaning 'centred, focused (masculine, singular)', from [mihwar] meaning 'axis', from [ħa:ra] 'turned (masculine, singular)' (ح-و-ر | h-w-r).
- مسخر [msxr], تمسخر [tamasxara] meaning 'mocked, made fun (masculine, singular)', from مسخرة [masxara] meaning 'mockery', from سخر [saxira] 'mocked (masculine, singular)' (derived from س-خ-ر[s-x-r])." Similar cases may be found in other Semitic languages such as Hebrew, Syriac, Aramaic, Maltese language and to a lesser extent Amharic.

Similar cases occur in Hebrew, for example Israeli Hebrew מ-ק-מ √m-q-m 'locate', which derives from Biblical Hebrew מקום måqom 'place', whose root is ק-ו-מ √q-w-m 'stand'. A recent example introduced by the Academy of the Hebrew Language is מדרוג midrúg 'rating', from מדרג midrág, whose root is ד-ר-ג √d-r-g 'grade'."

According to Ghil'ad Zuckermann, "this process is morphologically similar to the production of frequentative (iterative) verbs in Latin, for example:

- iactito 'to toss about' derives from iacto 'to boast of, keep bringing up, harass, disturb, throw, cast, fling away', which in turn derives from iacio 'to throw, cast' (from its past participle iactum).

Consider also Rabbinic Hebrew ת-ר-מ √t-r-m 'donate, contribute' (Mishnah: T'rumoth 1:2: 'separate priestly dues'), which derives from Biblical Hebrew תרומה t'rūmå 'contribution', whose root is ר-ו-מ √r-w-m 'raise'; cf. Rabbinic Hebrew ת-ר-ע √t-r-' 'sound the trumpet, blow the horn', from Biblical Hebrew תרועה t'rū'å 'shout, cry, loud sound, trumpet-call', in turn from ר-ו-ע √r-w-'." and it describes the suffix.

== Category-neutral roots ==
Decompositional generative frameworks suggest that roots hold little grammatical information and can be considered "category-neutral". Category-neutral roots are roots without any inherent lexical category but with some conceptual content that becomes evident depending on the syntactic environment. The ways in which these roots gain lexical category are discussed in Distributed Morphology and the Exoskeletal Model.

Theories adopting a category-neutral approach have not, as of 2020, reached a consensus about whether these roots contain a semantic type but no argument structure, neither semantic type nor argument structure, or both semantic type and argument structure.

In support of the category-neutral approach, data from English indicates that the same underlying root appears as a noun and a verb - with or without overt morphology.

- English examples - overt
  Root	Noun	Verb
  advertise	an advertisement	to advertise
  character	a character	to characterize
  employ	an employment	to employ
  alphabet	an alphabet	to alphabetize
- English Examples - Covert
  Root	Noun	Verb
  dance	a dance	to dance
  walk	a walk	to walk
  chair	a chair	to chair
  wardrobe	a wardrobe	to wardrobe

In Hebrew, the majority of roots consist of segmental consonants √CCC. Arad (2003) describes that the consonantal root is turned into a word due to pattern morphology. Thereby, the root is turned into a verb when put into a verbal environment where the head bears the "v" feature (the pattern).

Consider the root √š-m-n (ש-מ-נ).

Root √š-m-n (ש-מ-נ) in Hebrew
Pattern	Pronounced word	Gloss
CeCeC (n)	šemen	oil, grease
CaCCeCet (n)	šamenet	cream
CuCaC (n), CaCeC (adj)	šuman, šamen	fat
hiCCiC (v)	hišmin	grow fat/fatten
CiCCeC (n)	šimen	grease

Although all words vary semantically, the general meaning of a greasy, fatty material can be attributed to the root.

Furthermore, Arad states that there are two types of languages in terms of root interpretation. In languages like English, the root is assigned one interpretation whereas in languages like Hebrew, the root can form multiple interpretations depending on its environment. This occurrence suggests a difference in language acquisition between these two languages. English speakers would need to learn two roots in order to understand two different words whereas Hebrew speakers would learn one root for two or more words.

Root comparison between English and Hebrew (adapted from "Syntactic Categorization of Roots")
English Root	English Word	Hebrew Root	Hebrew Word	Gloss
√CREAM	cream	√š-m-n ש-מ-נ	šamenet	'cream'
√FAT	fat	√š-m-n ש-מ-נ	šuman (n), šamen (adj)	'fat'

Alexiadou and Lohndal (2017) advance the claim that languages have a typological scale when it comes to roots and their meanings and state that Greek lies in between Hebrew and English.

== See also ==
- Etymology
- Lemma (morphology)
- Lexeme
- Morphological typology
- Morphology (linguistics)
- Phono-semantic matching
- Principal parts
- Proto-Indo-European root
- Radical (Chinese character)
- Semitic root
- Word family
- Word stem
