= Christine Mallinson =

American linguist

- Education: North Carolina State University
- Scientific career
- Fields: Linguistics
- Website: Christine Mallinson

Christine Mallinson is an American linguist. She is professor of language, literacy, and culture and affiliate professor of gender, women's and sexuality studies at the University of Maryland, Baltimore County. Mallinson's interdisciplinary research examines the intersections of language, culture, and education, focusing on English language variation in the United States.

== Biography ==
Mallinson obtained her Ph.D. in sociology and anthropology, with concentrations in sociolinguistics and social inequality from North Carolina State University in 2006. Mallinson received the Nancy G. Pollock Graduate School award from the NC State College of Humanities and Social Sciences for her dissertation, "The Dynamic Construction of Race, Class, and Gender through Linguistic Practice among Women in a Black Appalachian Community," which was directed by professor of Sociology L. Richard Della Fave.

Mallinson joined UMBC as an assistant professor in 2006. Previously, she was a visiting lecturer in the Department of English at Duke University. At UMBC, Mallinson also serves as director of the Center for Social Science Scholarship and Special Assistant for Research and Creative Achievement in the Office of the Vice President for Research.

== Honors and recognition ==
Mallinson is the past chair of the Ethics Committee of the Linguistic Society of America and has served on the editorial boards of the journals American Speech, Language & Linguistics Compass, and Voice & Speech Review.

In August 2018, Mallinson was featured in the Linguistic Society of America's Member Spotlight.

In 2024, Mallinson was inducted as a Fellow of the Linguistic Society of America.

== Selected publications ==
- Charity Hudley, Anne H.; Mallinson, Christine; Bucholtz, Mary (2020). "Toward racial justice in linguistics: Interdisciplinary insights into theorizing race in the discipline and diversifying the profession". Language. 96 (4): e200–e235. doi:10.1353/lan.2020.0074. hdl:11603/20632.
- Charity Hudley, Anne H.; Mallinson, Christine (2017). ""It's worth our time": A model of culturally and linguistically supportive professional development for K-12 STEM educators". Cultural Studies of Science Education. 12 (3): 637–660. Bibcode:2017CSSE...12..637C. doi:10.1007/s11422-016-9743-7.
- Charity Hudley, Anne H.; Mallinson, Christine (2014). We Do Language: English Language Variation in the Secondary English Classroom. Teachers College Press.
- Mallinson, Christine; Wolfram, Walt (2002). "Dialect accommodation in a bi-ethnic mountain enclave community: More evidence on the development of African American English". Language in Society. 31 (5): 743–775. doi:10.1017/S0047404502315021.
