= Glanzberg =

Glanzberg is a German surname. Notable people with the surname include:

- Michael Glanzberg, American analytic philosopher
- Norbert Glanzberg (1910–2021), Galician-born French composer

== See also ==
- Elisabeth Glantzberg
