= Broselow =

Broselow is a surname. Notable people with the surname include:

- Ellen Broselow (born 1949), American experimental linguist
- James Broselow (1943–2025), American emergency physician, academic, inventor, and entrepreneur
