= Lidz =

Lidz is a surname. Notable people with the surname include:

- Franz Lidz (born 1951), American writer, journalist and pro basketball executive
- Jeffrey Lidz (fl. 1996), American linguist
- Theodore Lidz (1910–2001), American psychiatrist
