= Amy Rose Deal =

American linguist

- Occupations: Linguist; professor

Academic background
- Education: Brandeis University (B.A.); University of Massachusetts (Ph.D.)
- Website: https://linguistics.berkeley.edu/~ardeal/

Amy Rose Deal is associate professor of linguistics at the University of California, Berkeley. She works in the areas of syntax, semantics and morphology, on topics including agreement, indexical shift, ergativity, the person-case constraint, the mass/count distinction, and relative clauses. She has worked extensively on the grammar of the Sahaptin language Nez Perce. Deal is Editor-in-Chief of Natural Language Semantics, a major journal in the field.

== Education and career ==
Deal earned her B.A. from Brandeis University in 2005 and her Ph.D. from the University of Massachusetts Amherst in 2010, writing a dissertation under the supervision of Angelika Kratzer and Rajesh Bhatt.

Her book A Theory of Indexical Shift: Meaning, Grammar, and Crosslinguistic Variation was published in 2020 by the MIT Press. In 2022, she received the Linguistic Society of America Early Career Award for her "influential research" and her status as "a leader in the subfield of cross-linguistic semantics".
