= Anne H. Charity Hudley =

American linguist

- Born: Richmond, Virginia
- Education: Harvard University (BA, MA); University of Pennsylvania (PhD)
- Writing career
- Notable work: Understanding English Language Variation in U.S. Schools We Do Language: English Language Variation in the Secondary English Classroom The Indispensable Guide to Undergraduate Research
- Website: annecharityhudley.com

Anne Harper Charity Hudley is an American linguist who works on language variation in secondary schools. Since 2021, she has been a professor at the Stanford Graduate School of Education.

== Early life and education ==
Charity Hudley received her Ph.D. in linguistics from the University of Pennsylvania in 2005. She is from Richmond, Virginia, where she attended St. Catherine's School for 13 years. Her undergraduate degree is from Harvard University.

== Career and research ==
From 2005 to 2017, Charity Hudley was associate professor of education, English, and linguistics and the William and Mary Professor of Community Studies at the College of William and Mary. She also co-directed the William and Mary Scholars Undergraduate Experience (WMSURE) and was affiliated with the Africana Studies and Women's Studies programs. Thereafter, she held the North Hall endowed chair at the University of California, Santa Barbara before moving to Stanford in 2021. Since 2021, Charity Hudley is Professor of Education at the Stanford University Graduate School of Education (GSE). She is additionally a Trustee at the Center for Applied Linguistics (CAL).

Charity Hudley's research focus is the language of the American classroom, its relevance for the study of race and ethnicity, and how language use in the classroom relates to (and affects) educational attainment. This work aims at bringing knowledge of the field of sociolinguistics to educators, and helps us understand the ways in which literacy, dialect, and individual variation interact.

Charity Hudley has been actively involved in leadership roles in the Linguistic Society of America. Charity Hudley was the undergraduate program representative and chair of the subcommittee on diversity on the Linguistic Society of America Committee on Linguistics in Higher Education from 2009 to 2016, and in 2018 she was part of a special session held at the Linguistic Society of America Annual Meeting in Salt Lake City addressing topics of bias, power dynamics, and harassment in linguistics. She served as a member of the Linguistic Society of America Executive Committee from 2017 to 2020.

== Honors and distinctions ==
She is a member of the editorial board for Language, with a focus on the Teaching Linguistics section, for Language and Linguistics Compass (Sociolinguistics), and formerly for American Speech.

She delivered a forum lecture titled "Linguistics and Community Engagement: Keeping it Real," at the Linguistic Society of America Summer Institute at the University of Michigan in 2013.

She has discussed her book, We Do Language co-authored with Christine Mallinson, on several radio shows.

She has been interviewed by several major news organizations as an expert on language variation and racial justice.

In 2021, Charity Hudley was inducted as a Fellow of the American Association for the Advancement of Science, and in 2022 as a Fellow of the Linguistic Society of America.

== Select publications ==
- Charity Hudley, Anne H., Christine Mallinson, and Mary Bucholtz. (2020). Toward Racial Justice in Linguistics: Interdisciplinary Insights into Theorizing Race in the Discipline and Diversifying the Profession. Language 96(4), e200-e235. doi:10.1353/lan.2020.0074.
- Charity Hudley, Anne H. and Christine Mallinson. (2013.) We Do Language: English Language Variation in the Secondary English Classroom. Teachers College Press Multicultural Education Series.
- Charity Hudley, Anne H. and Christine Mallinson. (2010.) Understanding English Language Variation in U.S. Schools. Teachers College Press Multicultural Education Series.
