= Maria Polinsky =

Russian-American linguist

Maria "Masha" Polinsky is an American linguist specializing in theoretical syntax and study of heritage languages.

== Education and early life ==
Polinsky was born in Moscow, Russia. She received a B.A. in philology from Moscow University in 1979, an M.A. and a Ph.D. in 1986 in linguistics from the Institute for Linguistics of the Russian Academy of Sciences. Her dissertation examined the structure of antipassives in several ergative languages. She returned to this topic later in her career, with a number of papers on the syntax and distribution of antipassive constructions.

== Early work on Austronesian languages and folklore ==
In the early 1980s, while still in the Soviet Union, Polinsky developed an interest in Polynesian languages and folklore after reading James Michener's novel Hawaii. She taught herself Tongan using Maxwell's grammar and began investigating Niuean, a less well-studied language that posed novel questions for the study of ergativity and word order. Sandra Chung's work Case Marking and Grammatical Relations in Polynesian became a major influence on her research.

During this period, the Soviet Encyclopedia publishing house commissioned her to research and describe various Austronesian mythologies. She contributed entries on Polynesian and Micronesian mythology to the encyclopedia Myths of the Peoples of the World (first edition 1980-1982). This work led to two significant folklore collections: Myths, Legends, and Fairy Tales of Western Polynesia and Myths, Legends, and Fairy Tales of Fiji.

To compile these volumes, she sourced stories from old journals, microfiches, folklore collections, and missionary notes. The books featured extensive introductory articles providing ethnographic and historical context, maps, and illustrations based on Oceanic tapa motifs and Lapita pottery, as well as scholarly apparatus including glossaries, indices, and typological classification of narrative plots.

Prior to this work, Pacific Island folklore remained largely inaccessible to Russian-speaking audiences. Her systematic documentation came at a time when many Pacific Island oral traditions were at risk of being lost, making her work valuable for cultural preservation and comparative folklore studies.

Her engagement with Austronesian languages also resulted in a linguistic description of Niuean, which was done based on texts, dictionaries, and readings, without access to native speakers, and the Russian translation of Peter Bellwood's seminal work Man's Conquest of the Pacific (1978/1979).

== Career in the United States ==
She joined the University of Southern California as an Andrew Mellon Fellow in 1989, becoming an assistant professor in 1991 and an associate professor in 1995. She joined UC San Diego in 1996, later serving there as full professor and chair of the Department of Linguistics. In 2001 she founded the Heritage Language Program at that department. From 2006 to 2015 she served as a professor of linguistics and head of the Polinsky Language Science Lab at Harvard University. The lab's focus was on the combination of theoretical and experimental approaches to understudied languages, with the main emphasis on ergativity.

In 2016 she took a position as professor in the Department of Linguistics and an Associate Director of the Maryland Language Science Center at the University of Maryland. At Maryland, she established a research field station in Guatemala. Her continued work on Austronesian languages included fieldwork travel to Madagascar for work on Malagasy, and throughout Polynesia for linguistic fieldwork on Tongan, Niuean, and Tahitian. She is now Professor Emerita at the University of Maryland, College Park, and continues as Director of the National Heritage Language Resource Center, at UCLA.

== Research ==
Polinsky's research focuses on the relationship between syntax and information structure (syntactic encoding of topic and focus), left and right dislocation, and syntax-prosody interface. Recurrent themes in her syntactic research include long-distance dependencies, control/raising, ergativity, and scope. Polinsky is a strong advocate of a micro-typological approach to syntax, and she has done extensive primary work on Austronesian languages (especially Polynesian and Malagasy), Mayan languages and languages of the Caucasus.

Polinsky has been a pioneer of heritage language study and has played an active role in introducing heritage languages into modern linguistic theory. Her research has explored the ways in which heritage speakers are different from other speakers and learners, and the consequences of these differences for our understanding of language learning. She has also been an active practitioner of experimental work on understudied languages in fieldwork settings.

In addition to establishing the Heritage Language Program Heritage Language Program at UCSD, she was one of the founders of the Heritage Language Journal.

== Honors and service ==
Polinsky has been a visiting professor at the Max-Planck Institute for Evolutionary Anthropology in Leipzig; Amsterdam University; the University of California, Berkeley; Massachusetts Institute of Technology; and the Ecole Normale Supérieure.

She has served as associate editor of the journals Language and Natural Language and Linguistic Theory, and is currently on the editorial boards of the Heritage Language Journal, Linguistic Discovery, and Linguistics. Since 2007, Polinsky has been the director of the annual Heritage Language Research Institute.

In 2015, she was a Forum Lecturer at the Linguistic Society of America Linguistic Summer Institute, and in 2016 she became a Fellow of the Linguistic Society of America for "distinguished contributions to the discipline". She is also a fellow of the Norwegian Academy of Science and Letters.

In January 2025, a festschrift in her honor titled Syntax in Uncharted Territories: Essays in Honor of Maria Polinsky was published, edited by Lauren Clemens, Vera Gribanova, and Gregory Scontras.

== Selected publications ==
=== Books and edited volumes ===
- Polinsky, M. 1986. Myths, Legends, and Fairy Tales of Western Polynesia (in Russian). Moscow.
- Polinsky, M. 1989. Myths, Legends, and Fairy Tales of Fiji (in Russian). Moscow.
- Polinsky, M. 1989. Jazyk niue [The Niuean Language] (in Russian). Moscow: Nauka.
- Comrie, B. and M. Polinsky, (eds.) 1993. Causatives and transitivity. Amsterdam: John Benjamins.
- Comrie, B., G. Stone and M. Polinsky. 1996. The Russian language in the twentieth century. Oxford: Oxford University Press. (Revised edition 2023)
- Polinsky, M. 2016. Deconstructing Ergativity: Two Types of Ergative Languages and Their Features. Oxford Studies in Comparative Syntax. Oxford: Oxford University Press.
- Polinsky, M. 2018. Heritage Languages and Their Speakers. Cambridge Studies in Linguistics. Cambridge: Cambridge University Press.
- Polinsky, M. (ed.) 2021. The Oxford Handbook of Languages of the Caucasus. Oxford: Oxford University Press.
- Montrul, S. and M. Polinsky (eds.) 2022. The Cambridge Handbook of Heritage Languages and Linguistics. Cambridge: Cambridge University Press.
- Barbiers, S., N. Corver, and M. Polinsky (eds.) 2025. The Cambridge Handbook of Comparative Syntax. Cambridge: Cambridge University Press.

=== Translations ===
- Bellwood, P. 1978/1979. Man's Conquest of the Pacific (Russian translation by M. Polinsky).

=== Encyclopedia contributions ===
- Various entries on Polynesian and Micronesian mythology in Myths of the Peoples of the World encyclopedia (first edition 1980-1982).

=== Selected articles ===
- Polinsky, M. 1995. "American Russian: Language loss meets language acquisition", in Formal Approaches to Slavic Linguistics.
- Polinsky, M., E. Potsdam. 2001. "Long-distance agreement and topic in Tsez," Natural Language & Linguistic Theory 19(3): 583-646.
- Polinsky, M., E. Potsdam. 2002. "Backward control," Linguistic Inquiry 33(2): 245-282.
- Polinsky, M. 2006. "Incomplete acquisition: American Russian," Journal of Slavic Linguistics 14(2): 191-262.
- Polinsky, M. and O. Kagan. 2007. "Heritage languages: In the 'wild' and in the classroom," Language and Linguistics Compass 1(5): 368–395.
- Kupisch, T. and Polinsky, M. 2021. "Language history on fast forward: Innovations in heritage languages and diachronic change." Bilingualism: Language and Cognition, 1-12.
- Lau, E., R. Asatiani, N. Clarke, M. Socolof, and M. Polinsky. 2022. "A subject relative clause preference in a split-ergative language: ERP evidence from Georgian." Brain and Language 236.
- Ivanova-Sullivan, T., Sekerina, I., Tofighi, D., and M. Polinsky. 2022. "Language-Internal Reanalysis of Clitic Placement in Heritage Grammars." Languages 7, 24.
- Fridman, C., Polinsky, M., and Meir, N. 2024. "Cross-linguistic influence meets diminished input: A comparative study of heritage Russian in contact with Hebrew and English." Second Language Research.
- Polinsky, M. 2024. "Multiple grammars within linguistic populations: Distributions and theoretical implications." Linguistic Approaches to Bilingualism.
- Fuchs, Z., Parshina, O., Sekerina, I. & Polinsky, M. 2025. "Processing of verbal versus adjectival agreement: Implications for syntax and psycholinguistics." Glossa: a journal of general linguistics 10(1).
- Burukina, I., and M. Polinsky. 2025. "The antipassive and verbal projections." Journal of Linguistics.
