= Diane Brentari =

American linguist

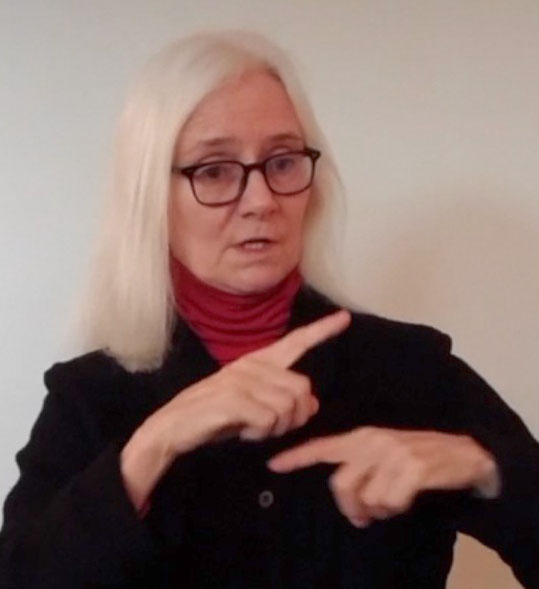
- Education: University of Chicago (PhD)
- Occupation: Linguist
- Scientific career
- Fields: Linguistics

Diane Brentari is an American linguist who specializes in sign languages and American Sign Language in particular.

== Education and career ==
Brentari received her PhD in Linguistics from the University of Chicago in 1990. Her dissertation, entitled Theoretical Foundations of American Sign Language Phonology, was supervised by John Goldsmith.

She is the Mary K. Werkman Professor of Linguistics and co-director of the Center for Gesture, Sign, and Language at the University of Chicago. She held a position at the University of California, Davis, and then led the Sign Language program at Purdue University before coming to the University of Chicago in 2011. She is also a Distinguished Visiting Professor at The Hebrew University of Jerusalem.

Brentari's research interests address the sign language grammars of Deaf communities—how these languages emerge, and the degree of variation that exists among them. She has analyzed the formal, cognitive, and cultural dimensions that motivate the similarities and differences among these languages. Her work focuses on sign language structure as a way to better understand the flexibility of the human language capacity in constructing spoken and signed languages, as well as the effects of communication mode (or modality) on language. Brentari's scholarship focuses on the phonology, morphology, and prosody of sign languages. Her current research has expanded to include analyses of a new protactile language.

== Honors ==
Brentar was awarded a Guggenheim Fellowship for the project Observing the Creation of Language (2020). Brentari was inducted as a Fellow of the Linguistic Society of America in 2022, and she was inducted into the American Academy of Arts and Sciences in 2024.

== Selected publications ==
=== Books ===
- Brentari, Diane (1998). A Prosodic Model of Sign Language Phonology. Cambridge, MA: MIT Press. ISBN 9780262024457.
- Brentari, Diane (2001). Foreign Vocabulary in Sign Languages: A Cross-linguistic Investigation of Word Formation. Mahwah, NJ: Lawrence Erlbaum Associates. ISBN 9781135670344.
- Brentari, Diane (2010). Sign Languages: A Cambridge Language Survey. Cambridge, UK: Cambridge University Press. ISBN 9781139487399.
- Brentari, Diane; Lee, Jackson (2018). Shaping Phonology. Chicago: University of Chicago Press. ISBN 9780226562599.
- Brentari, Diane (2019). Sign Language Phonology. Cambridge University Press. ISBN 9781107113473.

=== Chapters and Articles ===
- Brentari, Diane; Coppola, Marie; Mazzoni, Laura; Goldin-Meadow, Susan (2012). "When does a system become phonological? Handshape production in gesturers, signers, and homesigners". Natural Language and Linguistic Theory. 30 (1): 1–31. doi:10.1007/s11049-011-9145-1. PMC 3665423. PMID 23723534 – via ResearchGate.
- Goldin-Meadow, Susan; Brentari, Diane (2017). "Gesture, sign and language: The coming of age of sign language and gesture studies". Brain and Behavioral Sciences. 40: e46. doi:10.1017/S0140525X15001247. PMC 4821822. PMID 26434499.
- Abner, Natasha; Flaherty, Molly; Stangl, Katelyn; Coppola, Marie; Brentari, D; Goldin-Meadow, Ssusan (2019). "The Noun-Verb Distinction in Established and Emergent Sign Systems". Language. 5 (2): 230–267. doi:10.1353/lan.2019.0030. S2CID 198747498.
- Edwards, Terra; Brentari, Diane (2020). "Feeling phonology: The conventionalization of phonology in protactile communities in the United States". Language. 96 (4): 819–840. doi:10.1353/lan.2020.0063 – via Project MUSE.
- Brentari, Diane; Ergin, Rabia; Senghas, Ann; Cho, Pyeong Whan; Owens, Eli; Coppola, Marie (2021). "Community interactions and phonemic inventories in emerging sign language". Phonology. 38 (4): 571–609. doi:10.1017/S0952675721000336. PMC 12356508.
- Brentari, Diane; Goldin-Meadow, Susan; Horton, Laura; Senghas, Ann (2024). "The organization of verb meaning in Lengua de Señas Nicaragüense (LSN): Sequential or simultaneous structures?". GLOSS: A Journal of General Linguistics. 8 (1): 1–37. doi:10.16995/glossa.10342. PMC 12356425.
