= Georgia Zellou =

American linguistics professor

Georgia Zellou is an American linguistics professor at the University of California-Davis. Her research focuses on topics in phonetics and laboratory phonology.

== Education and research ==
Zellou received her PhD in linguistics from the University of Colorado-Boulder in 2012, with a dissertation entitled "Similarity and Enhancement: Nasality from Moroccan Arabic Pharyngeals and Nasals." She joined UC-Davis in 2014, and she is currently a co-director of the UC-Davis phonetics lab. She has conducted research on the phonetics of nasalization in numerous languages, and more recently has investigated the phonetics of human-AI interactions.

== Honors and awards ==
In May 2016, Georgia Zellou was a Visiting Fellow at the Center for Advanced Studies and the Institute of Phonetics and Speech Processing at LMU Munich, upon an invitation from PD Dr. Marianne Pouplier and Prof. Dr. Jonathan Harrington in the context of the CAS Research Focus project, "Speech and Language Processing: How Words Emerge and Dissolve."

In 2019, she received the Chancellor's Award for Excellence in Undergraduate Mentoring and she was named a UC-Davis Dean's Fellow in 2020.

In 2020, she was inducted as a Fellow of the Linguistic Society of America. She was a 2017-18 Hellman Foundation Fellow.

During the 2021–2022 academic year, she conducted research as a Fulbright scholar in France.

== Selected publications ==
- Cohn, Michelle, Bruno Ferenc Segedin & Georgia Zellou. 2022. Acoustic-phonetic properties of Siri- and human-directed speech. Journal of Phonetics 90, 101123. https://doi.org/10.1016/j.wocn.2021.101123
- Zellou, Georgia. 2017. Individual differences in the production of nasal coarticulation and perceptual compensation. Journal of Phonetics 61, 13–29. https://doi.org/10.1016/j.wocn.2016.12.002
- Zellou, Georgia & Delphine Dahan. 2019. Listeners maintain phonological uncertainty over time and across words: The case of vowel nasality in English. Journal of Phonetics 76, 100910. https://doi.org/10.1016/j.wocn.2019.06.001
- Zellou, Georgia & Meredith Tamminga. 2014. Nasal coarticulation changes over time in Philadelphia English. Journal of Phonetics 47, 18–35. https://doi.org/10.1016/j.wocn.2014.09.002
