= Anne Lobeck =

American linguist

Anne C. Lobeck
- Education: Whitman College (BA) University of Washington (MA, PhD)
- Occupation: Linguist
- Years active: 1983-2023
- Employer: Western Washington University
- Known for: Ellipsis

Anne C. Lobeck is an American linguist who specializes in syntactic theory and applied linguistics, with a focus on linguistics and education. She was a Professor of Linguistics at Western Washington University before her retirement in 2023. She is known for her work on ellipsis and linguistic pedagogy.

== Career ==
Lobeck obtained a B.A. in French from Whitman College in 1983 and an M.A. in linguistics from the University of Washington in 1979. She received her Ph.D. in linguistics from the same institution in 1986 with a dissertation entitled "Syntactic Constraints on VP Ellipsis". Her subsequent work on ellipsis in natural languages has contributed to the understanding of the phenomena in English, French, and German.

In 1990, Lobeck begun working at Western Washington University as an Assistant Professor in the English department. She worked in this role for 28 years, before the establishment of a Linguistics department at the university in 2019.

In 2006, Lobeck and Kristin Denham were the recipients of an NSF grant for their project "The Western Washington University Teaching Partnership Project: Improving Teacher Education through Partner Teaching". This project led to the publication of "Linguistics at School: Language Awareness in Primary and Secondary Education" (co-edited with Denham) in 2010, a collection that emphasizes the importance of collaboration between linguists and educators to raise awareness of the workings of language.

In 2021, Lobeck was inducted as a Fellow of the Linguistic Society of America.

== Key publications ==
- Denham, K. & A. Lobeck. 2018. Why Study Linguistics. London: Routledge.
- Lobeck, A. & K. Denham. 2013. Navigating English Grammar: A Guide to Analyzing Real Language. Boston, MA: Wiley-Blackwell.
- Denham, K. & A. Lobeck (eds.). 2010. Linguistics at School: Language Awareness in Primary and Secondary Education. New York: Cambridge University Press.
- Denham, K. & A. Lobeck. 2010. Linguistics for Everyone. Boston, MA: Cengage.
- Denham, K. & A. Lobeck (eds.). 2005. Language in the Schools: Integrating Linguistics into K-12 Teaching. Mahwah, NJ: Lawrence Erlbaum Associates.
- Lobeck, A. 2000. Discovering Grammar: An Introduction to English Sentence Structure. New York: Oxford University Press.
- Lobeck, A.1995. Ellipsis: Functional Heads, Licensing and Identification. New York: Oxford University Press.
