= Yael Sharvit =

American linguist

- Education: Rutgers University
- Scientific career
- Fields: Linguistics,
- Workplaces: University of Connecticut, UCLA
- Thesis: (1997)
- Doctoral advisor: Veneeta Dayal

Yael Sharvit is an American linguist who is Professor of Linguistics at UCLA. She specializes in semantics and the syntax-semantics interface.

== Career ==
Sharvit received her PhD in linguistics from Rutgers University in 1997. Her dissertation title is "The Syntax and Semantics of Functional Relative Clauses."

She joined the faculty of the University of Connecticut in 1999, leaving in 2011 to take up a position at UCLA.

== Research ==
Sharvit is known for her work on tense, including embedded tense (Sharvit 1999), or bound tense (Alxatib & Sharvit 2017), tense in free indirect discourse (Sharvit 2008) and cross-linguistic typologies of tense. She has also contributed to the semantics of questions (Sharvit 2002), relative clauses (Sharvit 1997), attitude reports (Charlow & Sharvit 2014), negative polarity items (Guerzoni & Sharvit 2007), resumptive pronouns (Sharvit 1999), and superlatives (Sharvit & Stateva 2002, Bumford & Sharvit 2022).

== Honors and distinctions ==
She is an Associate Editor at the Journal of Semantics. She also serves as co-editor-in-chief of the journal Linguistics and Philosophy.

== Selected publications ==
- Sharvit, Yael (1999). "Connectivity in specificational sentences". Natural Language Semantics. 7 (3): 299–339. doi:10.1023/A:1008390623435. S2CID 117847989.
- Sharvit, Yael (1999). "Functional Relative Clauses". Linguistics and Philosophy. 22 (5): 447–478. doi:10.1023/A:1005411720444. ISSN 0165-0157. JSTOR 25001753. S2CID 58725382.
- Sharvit, Yael (August 1, 1999). "Resumptive Pronouns in Relative Clauses". Natural Language & Linguistic Theory. 17 (3): 587–612. doi:10.1023/A:1006226031821. ISSN 1573-0859. S2CID 169736813.
- Sharvit, Yael (2002). "Embedded Questions and 'De Dicto' Readings". Natural Language Semantics. 10 (2): 97–123. doi:10.1023/A:1016573907314. ISSN 0925-854X. JSTOR 23748701. S2CID 117802759.
- Sharvit, Yael; Stateva, Penka (2002). "Superlative Expressions, Context, and Focus". Linguistics and Philosophy. 25 (4): 453–504. doi:10.1023/A:1020875809794. ISSN 0165-0157. JSTOR 25001857. S2CID 60715693.
- Guerzoni, Elena; Sharvit, Yael (2007). "A question of strength: on NPIs in interrogative clauses". Linguistics and Philosophy. 30 (3): 361–391. doi:10.1007/s10988-007-9014-x. S2CID 60878758.
- Sharvit, Yael (2008). "The Puzzle of Free Indirect Discourse". Linguistics and Philosophy. 31 (3): 353–395. doi:10.1007/s10988-008-9039-9. ISSN 0165-0157. JSTOR 40270140. S2CID 62735532.
- Alxatib, Sam; Sharvit, Yael (2017). Bound tense in relative clauses: Evidence from VP-ellipsis. Linguistic Inquiry 48: 697–711. doi:10.1162/LING_a_00259
