= Jorge Hankamer =

Academic background
- Education: Rice University (B.A., M.A.)
- Alma mater: Yale University (Ph.D)
- Academic advisor: David M. Perlmutter

Jorge Hankamer is Professor of Linguistics at the University of California, Santa Cruz, where he is also chair of the Philosophy department. He earned his B.A. in Mathematics and Physics and M.A. in German Literature at Rice University before going on to complete a Ph.D in linguistics at Yale University. His dissertation, Constraints on Deletion in Syntax, has since been published under the title "Deletion in Coordinate Structures" by the Harvard University Press's Outstanding Dissertations in Linguistics Series. A student of David Perlmutter, Hankamer has been one of the leading experts on the syntax of ellipsis, coordination and anaphora since the publication of his doctoral dissertation and his early work with Ivan Sag on Deep and Surface Anaphors. His keçi system (from the Turkish word for goat) is an early top-down morphological parser for Turkish.
