= Semantics and Pragmatics =

- Discipline: Semantics, Pragmatics
- Language: English
- Edited by: Louise McNally, Kjell Johan Sæbø

Publication details
- History: 2007–present
- Publisher: Linguistic Society of America via Public Knowledge Project
- Open access: Yes
- License: CC-BY 4.0
- Impact factor: 1.1 (2023)

Standard abbreviations
- ISO 4: Semant. Pragmat.

Indexing
- ISSN: 1937-8912

Links
- Journal homepage

Semantics and Pragmatics (abbreviated S&P) is a peer-reviewed diamond open access academic journal covering research pertaining to meaning in natural language. A highly prestigious journal, it is one of the most important venues in formal semantics, alongside Natural Language Semantics, Linguistics and Philosophy, and the Journal of Semantics.

It was established by David Beaver and Kai von Fintel in 2007 and has been published by the Linguistic Society of America since 2013. The journal is funded by MIT and UT Austin, eliminating the need for article processing fees faced by many other open access initiatives. Its current editors-in-chief are Louise McNally and Kjell Johan Sæbø.

The journal's establishment has been viewed as part of a trend towards a tighter integration between formal semantics and formal pragmatics. Work published in the journal includes papers from the ongoing debate regarding whether implicatures are computed within the grammar or via post-compositional Gricean reasoning.

== Abstracting and indexing ==
The journal is abstracted and indexed in the Emerging Sources Citation Index, DOAJ, International Bibliography of Periodical Literature, Linguistic Bibliography, and the Modern Language Association Database.
