= Heather Goad =

Canadian linguist

Heather Goad is a Canadian linguist. Her research explores areas of phonology and language acquisition, especially investigating the shapes of phonological systems, including contrasts in English, French, Korean, Portuguese, Italian and Nepali, as well as the developmental paths of acquiring speech sounds by first and second language learners.

== Career and research ==
Goad earned her BA in Linguistics at the University of British Columbia and completed her PhD in Linguistics in 1994 at the University of Southern California under the supervision of Jean-Roger Vergnaud.

Since 1992 she has taught in the Department of Linguistics at McGill University, and served there as an associate dean in Graduate and Postdoctoral Studies.

Goad's work on child language has shown the prevalence of consonant harmony via primary place of articulation. The influence of her acquisition studies has been cited for showing the phonetic basis of variation of -s plural forms on real vs. novel plural production. She created a corpus of longitudinal child speech data of English and French learners, which scholars from multiple institutions have used for research work. The corpus is part of the PhonBank project, funded by Quebec with an FCAR grant (Fonds pour la formation de chercheurs et l'aide à la recherche).

In 2015 she and Lydia White were awarded a research grant from the Social Sciences and Humanities Research Council of Canada (SSHRC) to study the Phonological Effects on Grammatical Representation and Processing, which looks at the phonological knowledge of second language learners and bilingual speakers, putting forward the Prosodic Transfer Hypothesis (PTH), a theory that proposed an explanation for kinds of difficulties that language learners experience with the morphosyntax of a second language. As part of the conversation that their work initiated, in conjunction with their article on this theory, they published a response in Linguistic Approaches to Bilingualism.

Goad contributed to work comparing the range of sound patterns acquired by humans with the set sound patterns acquired by zebra finches.

== Awards and honors ==
Goad was an invited speaker at the 2015 West Coast Conference on Formal Linguistics, held in Vancouver.

In 2014, she was an invited lecturer in phonology and language acquisition at the Norwegian Graduate Researcher School in Linguistics and Philology.

She was a co-editor of the Canadian Journal of Linguistics from 1994-2003 and an Associate Editor of Language Acquisition from 2004-2014.

Since 2013 she has been a member of the Editorial Board of Language Acquisition.

She is on the Advisory Boards for two book series: the Oxford Studies in Phonology series published by Oxford University Press and the Language Acquisition & Language Disorders series published by John Benjamins.

== Selected publications ==
- Donghyun Kim, Meghan Clayards, and Heather Goad. 2018. "A longitudinal study of individual differences in the acquisition of new vowel contrasts." Journal of Phonetics 67: 1-20.
- Heather Goad. 2016. Phonological Processes in Children's Production: Convergence with and Divergence from Adult Grammars. The Oxford Handbook of Developmental Linguistics, Jeffrey Lidz, William Snyder, Joe Pater (eds.)
- Heather Goad. 2011. The representation of sC clusters. The Blackwell companion to phonology.
- Heather Goad and Lydia White. 2008. Prosodic structure and the representation of L2 functional morphology: A nativist approach." Lingua.
- Heather Goad. "Are children's grammars rogue grammars? Glide substitution in branching onsets." Recherches linguistiques de Vincennes.
- Heather Goad and Lydia White. 2006. "Ultimate attainment in interlanguage grammars: A prosodic approach." Second Language Research.
- Heather Goad and Yvan Rose. 2004. "Input elaboration, head faithfulness and evidence for representation in the acquisition of left-edge clusters in West Germanic." Constraints in phonological acquisition.
- Heather Goad and Kathleen Brannen. 2003. Phonetic evidence for phonological structure in syllabification. The Phonological Spectrum: Volume II: Suprasegmental structure. Edited by Jeroen van de Weijer, Vincent J. van Heuven and Harry van der Hulst.
- Heather Goad. 1997. Consonant harmony in child language: An optimality theoretic account. Language Acquisition and Language Disorders.
