= Kristin Denham =

American linguist

- Education: University of Washington
- Scientific career
- Fields: Linguistics
- Website: Kristin Denham

Kristin E. Denham is a linguist and professor in the Department of Linguistics at Western Washington University. Her research and teaching interests include syntactic theory, Native American languages, language teaching and revitalization projects, and linguistics in K-12 education. Denham has studied question formation in Babine-Witsuwit'en, an Athabaskan language, and has also done some work on Salish languages, spoken throughout the Salish Sea region.

== Biography ==
Denham obtained her Ph.D. in linguistics from the University of Washington in 1997. Her dissertation was titled "A minimalist account of optional wh-movement". Her committee was chaired by Frederick Newmeyer. Denham first joined Western Washington University in 1996 as a Visiting assistant professor.

Denham directs several projects related to linguistics in K-12 education. Among these are Exploring Language: Daily Language Investigations for English Language Arts and Voices of the Pacific Northwest. In April 2020, Denham was featured in the Linguistic Society of America's Member Spotlight.

== Awards ==
In 2024, Denham was inducted as a Fellow of the Linguistic Society of America.

== Selected publications ==
- Larson, Richard K.; Denham, Kristin; Lobeck, Anne (2019). "The AP Linguistics initiative". Language. 95 (3): e381–e393.
- Denham, Kristin; Lobeck, Anne (2010). Linguistics for Everyone: An Introduction. Boston, MA: Cengage (Wadsworth).
- Denham, Kristin, and Anne Lobeck (eds.) (2005). Language in the schools: Integrating linguistic knowledge into K–12 education. Mahwah, NJ: Lawrence Erlbaum.
