= Megan Crowhurst =

Megan Jane Crowhurst is an Australian- and Canadian-raised linguist and Professor of Linguistics at the University of Texas at Austin in the United States.

== Career ==
Crowhurst earned her BA in linguistics at the University of British Columbia (1985) and the MA and PhD at the University of Arizona (1989 and 1991). She has held academic positions at Yale University, the University of North Carolina at Chapel Hill, and, since 1999, in the Department of Linguistics at the University of Texas at Austin.

She works in the area of phonology, researching aspects of prosody, especially prosodic morphology, phonological stress, and the perception of rhythm. Often focusing on documenting these aspects within endangered languages, she has conducted fieldwork with speakers of Tupi-Guarani languages in Bolivia and speakers of Zapotec in Oaxaca, Mexico.

== Honors and distinctions ==
Crowhurst was a member of the Linguistic Society of America (LSA) task force that created the Women In Linguistics Mentoring Alliance (WILMA) to provide a system to offer mentoring opportunities for female linguists. She also served on the LSA committee, Endangered Languages and Their Preservation, chairing the committee in 2001. Crowhurst has served as the Senior Associate Editor (2016-2017) and Co-editor (2017-2020) of the journal Language. She is a co-founder of the LSA journal Phonological Data and Analysis. Crowhurst was inducted as a Fellow of the Linguistic Society of America in January 2021.

== Selected publications ==
Megan J. Crowhurst. 2019. The Iambic/Trochaic Law: Nature or Nurture? Language and Linguistic Compass. doi:10.1111/lnc3.12360
Megan J. Crowhurst. 2018. The influence of varying vowel phonation and duration on rhythmic grouping preferences among Spanish and English speakers. J. Phonetics 66 (Jan.), 82–99. doi:10.1016/j.wocn.2017.09.001
Megan J. Crowhurst. 2018. The joint influence of vowel duration and creak on the perception of internal phrase boundaries. J. Acoustical Society of America 143(3), EL147-153. doi:10.1121/1.5025325
Megan Crowhurst. 2016. Iambic-Trochaic law effects among native speakers of Spanish and English. Laboratory Phonology: Journal of the Association for Laboratory Phonology 7(1), 12. https://doi.org/10.5334/labphon.42
Megan Crowhurst and Sara Trechter. 2014. Vowel-rhotic metathesis in Guarayu. International Journal of American Linguistics 80, 127–173. https://doi.org/10.1086/675421
Megan Jane Crowhurst and Lev D. Michael. 2005. Iterative footing and prominence-driven stress in Nanti (Kampa). Language 81(1), 47-95. https://doi.org10.1353/lan.2005.0013
