= Natural Language Semantics =

- Discipline: Linguistic semantics
- Language: English
- Edited by: Amy Rose Deal

Publication details
- History: 1993–present
- Publisher: Springer Science+Business Media
- Frequency: Quarterly
- Impact factor: 1.1 (2022)

Standard abbreviations
- ISO 4: Nat. Lang. Semant.

Indexing
- CODEN: NLSEEM
- ISSN: 0925-854X (print); 1572-865X (web)
- LCCN: 93643719
- JSTOR: 0925854X
- OCLC no.: 243539944

Links
- Journal homepage; Online access

Natural Language Semantics (NLS) is a quarterly peer-reviewed academic journal covering formal semantics and its interfaces in grammar, especially in syntax. The journal features mainly research papers as well as some short essays. It is considered one of the top four journals in formal semantics, alongside Linguistics and Philosophy, the Journal of Semantics, and Semantics and Pragmatics.

== History ==
NLS was founded in 1993 by Irene Heim and Angelika Kratzer, who served as its first editors-in-chief. It was founded in order to provide a venue for research that integrates formal semantics with other branches of linguistics, in contrast to previously established journals that emphasized connections to logic and philosophy of language.

In 2026, the editors and editorial board resigned en masse in order to found a new diamond open access journal Semantics of Natural Languages (SNL) which will published by Open Library of Humanities. The decision followed editorial pressure from Springer, which had threatened to merge the journal unless the editors increased revenues by publishing more papers. Springer has stated that 2026 will be the final volume of NLS, which will thereafter cease publication.

== Reception ==
NLS grew to be the central venue for the then-emerging study of crosslinguistic variation and typology within formal semantics. The journal played a crucial role in establishing formal semantics as a core area within theoretical linguistics. Work published in the journal has been described as displaying "the same standards of lucidity and originality that mark its [founders] own thinking and writing".

According to the Journal Citation Reports, the journal has a 2022 impact factor of 1.1.

== Abstracting and indexing ==
The journal is abstracted and indexed in:

- Social Sciences Citation Index
- Scopus
- EBSCO databases
- Academic OneFile
- Arts & Humanities Citation Index
- Linguistic Bibliography
- Bibliography of Linguistic Literature
- FRANCIS
- Linguistics Abstracts
