= Language Acquisition (journal) =

- Discipline: Language acquisition
- Language: English
- Edited by: Sudha Arunachalam

Publication details
- History: 1990 - present
- Publisher: Taylor & Francis Group
- Frequency: Quarterly

Standard abbreviations
- ISO 4: Lang. Acquis.

Indexing
- ISSN: 1048-9223 (print); 1532-7817 (web)

Links
- Journal homepage; Taylor & Francis Group

Language Acquisition: A Journal of Developmental Linguistics is an American peer-reviewed journal in psycholinguistics that has been published quarterly since 1990 and is devoted to studies of first language acquisition and second language acquisition. It was originally dedicated to work that was informed by, and relevant to, current research in generative linguistics, but has since expanded in scope to accommodate a variety of theoretical perspectives. Its founding co-editors were Robert Berwick, Thomas Roeper, and Kenneth Wexler. From 2004 to 2012 it was co-edited by Diane Lillo-Martin and William Snyder (both from University of Connecticut), and from 2013 to 2020 by Jeffrey Lidz from the University of Maryland. The current editor is Sudha Arunachalam from New York University. The journal, which is available online with subscription, was published by Lawrence Erlbaum Associates from 1990 until 2007, and is now published by the Taylor & Francis Group.
