= Rena Torres Cacoullos =

American linguist

Rena Torres Cacoullos is an American linguist known for her work on language variation and change, as well as her research on processes of grammaticalization and the linguistic outcomes of language contact. She is currently Professor of Spanish Linguistics in the Department of Spanish, Italian, and Portuguese at the Pennsylvania State University.

== Education and research ==
Torres Cacoullos earned her PhD in Hispanic Linguistics at the University of New Mexico. She was Assistant Professor, Department of Romance Languages and Literatures / Linguistics, University of Florida in 1999-2000. Between 2000-2009 she was affiliated with the Department of Spanish and Portuguese at University of New Mexico. Since 2009 Torres Cacoullos has been teaching at the Program in Linguistics at the Department of Spanish, Italian and Portuguese at Pennsylvania State University. She is a leading expert on New Mexican Spanish and has developed a corpus of code-switched speech in the New Mexican Spanish-English bilingual community with collaborator Catherine E. Travis.

She has served as an editor of Language Variation and Change since 2007.

== Honors ==
In 2020, Torres Cacoullos was inducted as a Fellow of the Linguistic Society of America.

== Selected publications ==
=== Volumes authored ===
Grammaticization, synchronic variation, and language contact. A study of Spanish progressive -ndo constructions. Amsterdam/Philadelphia: John Benjamins, 2000.

=== Other publications ===
A complete list of Torres Cacoullos' published book chapters, papers, and proceedings publications can be found in her curriculum vitae, located on her webpage.
