= Edwin Battistella =

American linguist

Edwin L. Battistella
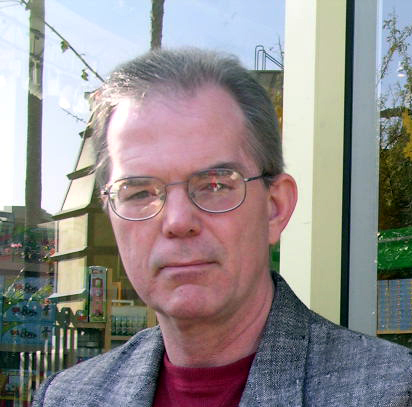
- Born: 1955 (age 70–71)
- Occupations: Writer and University Professor
- Board member of: Executive Committee, Linguistic Society of America, 2014-2017; Board of Directors, Oregon Humanities, 2009-2011; Chautauqua Poets and Writers Board, 2007-2018; Editorial Board member, The Oregon Encyclopedia, 2008-; Coeditor-in-chief, Wiley-Blackwell’s online journal Linguistics and Language Compass, 2006-; Co-editor of Wiley-Blackwell’s Linguistic Abstracts, 2008-2012, Editor, 2006-2008, Associate Editor, 2002-2005; Book review editor for Language, 1995-2002.
- Spouse: Maureen Flanagan Battistella
- Awards: Linguistic Society of America Fellow

Academic background
- Education: Rutgers College, 1976 BA; City University of New York, 1981 PhD

Academic work
- Discipline: Linguistics
- Website: http://www.edwinbattistella.com/

Edwin Battistella (born 1955) is an American linguist known for work on markedness, syntax, and language attitudes. He is an emeritus professor of Humanities and Culture at Southern Oregon University in Ashland, Oregon.

== Background ==
Battistella studied Slavic languages and literatures at Rutgers College, completing a BA in 1976, and linguistics at the City University of New York Graduate School and University Center, receiving a Ph.D. in 1981. His dissertation, Topics in the Theory of Inflection, written under the direction of Robert Fiengo, developed the early theory of abstract case introduced in Noam Chomsky’s 1980 article "On Case Theory". The dissertation proposed that many instances of grammatical agreement could be treated as the assignment of abstract case features from clauses to the categories they contained, making a distinction between inherent and assigned case features.

== Scholarly contributions ==
Battistella is the author of two books on the theory of markedness. Markedness: The Evaluative Superstructure of Language, was a study of the Prague School principle of structural asymmetry as developed by Nikolai Trubetzkoy and Roman Jakobson. In Markedness, Battistella identified the diagnostics of marked and unmarked opposites in Jakobson’s work from the 1920s through the 1980s, proposed a comprehensive set of markedness values for English grammar and connected markedness to the idea of intrinsic hierarchy. In The Logic of Markedness, Battistella more explicitly developed the connections between Jakobson’s ideas and those of Noam Chomsky and Morris Halle, attempting to reconcile structuralist and generative views of markedness.

Two later books have focused on 19th and 20th century language attitudes. Bad Language: Are Some Words Better Than Others? published in 2005, develops the case for a linguistically informed view of usage rather one based on oversimplifications and folklore. Do You Make These Mistakes in English? The Story of Sherwin Cody’s Famous Language School, published in 2009, combined a biography of correspondence school entrepreneur Sherwin Cody with an exploration of language and cultural attitudes that made self-improvement and correspondence learning educational forces in the first half of the twentieth century.

A fifth book, his 2014 Sorry About That: The Language of Public Apology, analyzes the public apologies of politicians, entertainers, businessmen, and others, with the goal of showing how certain language creates sincere or insincere apologies. The work connects actual apologies with the broader social, ethical, and linguistic principles behind them. His 2020 book, Dangerous Crooked Scoundrels: Insulting the President, from Washington to Trump, analyzes and categorizes over 500 political insults aimed at the forty-five U.S. presidents and how they responded. The work puts political insults in historical context, emphasizes the importance of the First Amendment, and shows contemporary American politics to be part of a broader narrative.

In 2026, he published a literary history of the author Dorothy B. Hughes (1904-1993) titled Dorothy B. Hughes: A Poet Turns to Crime. The book combines discussion of Hughes’s literary output and the story of her life, examining her work in conversation with her background and personal relationships, and situating Hughes’s career within the broader context of twentieth-century crime fiction and her lifelong concern with equality.

In addition, Professor Battistella is the author of a number of articles and book chapters on pronoun reference, the syntax of the English verb system, traditional grammar and style.

== Professional activities ==
Battistella has held teaching, administrative and research positions at the University of Alabama in Birmingham, the 1986 Linguistic Society of America Summer Institute, the IBM Thomas J. Watson Research Center, and Wayne State College in Nebraska. He has been at Southern Oregon University since 2000, serving as Dean of Arts and Letters from 2000 to 2006 and as Interim Provost from 2007 to 2008.

From 1995 to 2001, Battistella served as the first book review editor for Language, the journal of the Linguistic Society of America. In 2014, he began a three-year term on the Society's Executive Committee.

In 2006 he became the editor of Wiley-Blackwell’s Linguistic Abstracts, succeeding D. Terence Langendoen, and he and Rochelle Lieber became the founding editors-in-chief of Wiley-Blackwell's peer-reviewed online journal Language and Linguistics Compass.

In 1986, he served as an expert witness for the American Civil Liberties Union, in a Federal Court case in which a trucker challenged an Alabama state statute prohibiting the public display of "any bumper sticker, sign or writing which depicts obscene language descriptive of sexual or excretory activities". From 2009 to 2015 Battistella served on the board of directors of Oregon Humanities, a state affiliate of the National Endowment for the Humanities. He is also a member of the editorial board of The Oregon Encyclopedia, a peer-reviewed online state-encyclopedia established during Oregon’s sesquicentennial. He has contributed entries on Damon Knight, Kim Novak, Les Schwab, Lenn Hannon, and Albert Kitzhaber, among others.

== Books ==
- Battistella, Edwin. Dorothy B. Hughes: A Poet Turns to Crime. University of Missouri Press, 2026.
- Battistella, Edwin. Dangerous Crooked Scoundrels: Insulting the President, from Washington to Trump. Oxford University Press, 2020.
- Battistella, Edwin. Sorry About That: The Language of Public Apology. Oxford University Press, 2014.
- Battistella, Edwin. Do You Make These Mistakes in English? The Story of Sherwin Cody's Famous Language School. Oxford University Press, 2008.
- Battistella, Edwin. Bad Language: Are Some words Better Than Others? Oxford University Press, 2005.
- Battistella, Edwin. The Logic of Markedness. Oxford University Press, 1996.
- Battistella, Edwin. Markedness: The Evaluative Superstructure of Language. State University of New York Press, 1990.
