= Michael Glanzberg =

American analytic philosopher

Education
- Education: Harvard University (PhD)
- Thesis: The Paradox of the Liar and the Problem of Context
- Doctoral advisor: Charles Parsons, Warren Goldfarb

Philosophical work
- Era: 21st-century philosophy
- Region: Western philosophy
- Institutions: Rutgers University; MIT; University of Toronto
- Main interests: Philosophy of language, formal semantics, philosophical logic, philosophy of mathematics, metaphysics, linguistics
- Website: https://michaelglanzberg.org/

Michael Glanzberg is an American analytic philosopher specializing in philosophy of language and philosophical logic who is currently a professor in philosophy at Rutgers University. He received his PhD in philosophy from Harvard University, where Charles Parsons and Warren Goldfarb supervised his dissertation. Glanzberg has previously held faculty positions at Northwestern University, University of California, Davis, Erindale College at the University of Toronto, and MIT. Often working at the intersection of logic and the philosophy of language, Glanzberg is recognized for his work on quantification, paradox, semantics, theories of truth, and the role of context in various linguistic settings. He frequently collaborates with Jc Beall. He serves as Co-Editor-in-Chief for the journal Linguistics and Philosophy and edited The Oxford Handbook of Truth (2018).

== See also ==
- Absolute generality
- Contextualism
