= Journal of Semantics =

- Discipline: Linguistic semantics
- Language: English
- Edited by: Emmanuel Chemla, Yasutada Sudo

Publication details
- History: 1982–present
- Publisher: Oxford University Press (United Kingdom)
- Frequency: Quarterly

Standard abbreviations
- ISO 4: J. Semant.

Indexing
- ISSN: 0167-5133 (print); 1477-4593 (web)

Links
- Journal homepage

The Journal of Semantics is a leading international peer-reviewed journal of semantics of natural languages published by Oxford University Press. Its Managing Editors are Emmanuel Chemla (CNRS) and Yasutada Sudo (University College London). The journal is available online with subscription via Oxford Journals.

It is one of four top journals in formal semantics, alongside Natural Language Semantics, Linguistics and Philosophy, and Semantics and Pragmatics.
