= Lyn Frazier =

American linguist (born 1952)

- Born: October 15, 1952 (age 74); Madison, Wisconsin
- Education: University of Connecticut,1978 (PhD)
- Occupation: Linguist
- Employer: University of Massachusetts Amherst
- Title: Professor emerita
- Awards: Outstanding Accomplishments in Research and Creative Activity

Lyn Frazier (born October 15, 1952, in Madison, Wisconsin) is an American experimental linguist, focusing on psycholinguistic research of adult sentence comprehension. She is professor emerita at the University of Massachusetts Amherst.

== Education ==
Frazier received her PhD in 1978 from the University of Connecticut under the supervision of Janet Dean Fodor, on the subject of parsing strategies in syntax.

She is currently a Professor emerita in the Department of Linguistics at the University of Massachusetts Amherst.

== Career and research ==
Frazier's work has examined how listeners approach the task of processing the incoming language stream. She has proposed and refined syntactic parsing models, including a two-tier parsing system (Frazier & Fodor 1978), the garden path model (Rayner & Frazier 1987, Clifton & Frazier 1989), and the Active Filler Hypothesis (Frazier & Clifton 1989). Her more recent work has focused on how listeners parse ellipsis (Clifton & Frazier 2010).

== Awards and honors ==
She was named the first Distinguished Graduate Mentor at University of Massachusetts and received an award from the University of Massachusetts system for Outstanding Accomplishments in Research and Creative Activity.

In 2014 she was elected a Fellow of the Linguistic Society of America. A festschrift in her honor was published in 2019 (Carlson et al. 2019).

She is co-editor of the book series Studies in Theoretical Psycholinguistics, published by Springer.

== Selected works ==
- (2010) Clifton, C., and Frazier, L. "Imperfect ellipsis: Antecedents beyond syntax?" Syntax 13(4), 279-297. https://doi.org/10.1111/j.1467-9612.2010.00142.x
- (2002) Clifton, C., K. Carlson and L. Frazier. "Informative prosodic boundaries." Language and Speech 45(2), 87-114. https://doi.org/10.1177/00238309020450020101
- (1989) Clifton, C., Frazier, L. "Comprehending Sentences with Long-Distance Dependencies." In: Carlson, G.N., Tanenhaus, M.K. (eds) Linguistic Structure in Language Processing. Studies in Theoretical Psycholinguistics, vol 7. Springer, Dordrecht. https://doi.org/10.1007/978-94-009-2729-2_8
- (1989) Frazier, L. and Clifton, C., Jr. "Successive cyclicity in the grammar and the parser." Language and Cognitive Processes, 4(2), 93-126. https://doi.org/10.1080/01690968908406359
- (1987) Rayner, K. & Frazier, L. Parsing Temporarily Ambiguous Complements. The Quarterly Journal of Experimental Psychology Section A, 39(4), 657–673. https://doi.org/10.1080/14640748708401808
- (1978) Frazier, L. and Fodor, J.D. "The sausage machine: A new two-stage parsing model." Cognition 6, 291-325. https://doi.org/10.1016/0010-0277(78)90002-1
