= Language attitudes =

Evaluative reactions towards languages

Language attitudes refer to an individual's evaluative reactions or opinions toward languages and the speakers of those languages. These attitudes can be positive, negative, or neutral, and they play a crucial role in shaping language use, communication patterns, and interactions within a society. Language attitudes are extensively studied in several areas such as social psychology, sociolinguistics or education It has long been considered to be a triad of cognitive, affective, and behavioral components. Language attitudes play an important role in language learning, identity construction, language maintenance, language planning and policy, among other facets of language development. These attitudes are dynamic and multifaceted, shaping our perceptions, interactions, and societal structures.

== Measurement ==
The study of language attitudes employs three primary methodologies: direct, indirect, and societal. The direct approach entails explicitly soliciting respondents to articulate their language attitudes, typically employing questionnaires and interviews. For example, participants may encounter a roster of language varieties and/or speakers, being prompted to assess each using evaluative trait scales, often facilitated by Likert scales. The indirect approach similarly involves seeking respondents' reports on their language attitudes, but in more nuanced manners. A prominent technique in this category is the speaker evaluation paradigm, wherein participants listen to a sequence of audio-recorded voices or "guises," each representing distinct language varieties. Subsequently, participants evaluate each using evaluative trait scales or alternative methods.

Implicit association tasks, in various forms, also fall under the indirect approach, aiming to capture subconscious associations between mental representations of languages or language varieties. Researchers opt for direct observation or listening to language attitude "artifacts," such as media portrayals of diverse linguistic groups, to deduce prevailing language attitudes. Methodologies within this approach encompass ethnography, discourse analysis, and content analysis.

== Changes ==
Language attitudes, like other social constructs, are subject to change by social influences, as well as by the individual's motivation to maintain cognitive consistency when cognitive dissonance occurs. It has been shown that individual language attitudes evolve with time, especially in situations of language contact. Language attitudes change with age and redefining contexts.

Language attitudes not only change at the individual but also at the societal level. This is particularly relevant from an historical point of view. The same languages, speakers, or accents are more or less valued depending on the time.

== Sources ==
Language attitudes are shaped by various factors, both individual and societal. One primary source is linguistic prestige. Languages or dialects associated with higher social classes, economic power, or political influence are often considered prestigious. Linguistic hierarchies are established in this way. This perception can lead to positive attitudes toward those languages and negative attitudes toward others. For instance, in many societies, a standard dialect or the language of the elite is often viewed more favourably than regional dialects or minority languages.

Social identity theory illuminates’ language attitudes by emphasizing how individuals derive a sense of self from linguistic affiliations. People tend to favour languages aligned with their identity, influencing positive attitudes. This theory also underscores the intersection of linguistic and social identities, providing insights into the intricate dynamics shaping attitudes towards diverse languages within societies.

Families and social networks are another significant source of language attitudes. Children often adopt the language attitudes of their parents, peers, teachers, etc. Social relationships in general (networks) has also been proved to be of great importance to understand language attitudes. Interethnic contact (according to the contact hypothesis) exerts an important impact to prompt positive attitudes in bi/multilingual settings.

Additionally, educational institutions contribute to language attitudes through language policies, teaching methods, and the choice of languages taught. Education significantly shapes language attitudes, influencing perceptions of linguistic prestige and standardization. Through formal education, individuals internalize language ideologies and norms, impacting their attitudes towards specific linguistic varieties. The curriculum's selection of standard languages and dialects, along with an emphasis on linguistic correctness, reinforces established hierarchies. Inclusive language policies in educational settings positively impact attitudes toward diverse linguistic forms, fostering linguistic equity.
