= Duane Watson =

American neuroscientist

Duane G Watson
- Born: 1976 (age 49–50)
- Education: Massachusetts Institute of Technology; Princeton University
- Scientific career
- Workplaces: Vanderbilt University; University of Illinois at Urbana–Champaign
- Thesis: Intonational phrasing in language production and comprehension (2002)
- Website: Duane Watson

Duane Girard Watson (born 1976) is an American neuroscientist and professor of psychology and human development at Vanderbilt University. He holds the Frank W. Mayborn Chair in Cognitive Science and leads the Vanderbilt University Communication and Language Laboratory.

== Early life and education ==
Watson is from Las Vegas. Watson studied psychology at Princeton University. He originally intended to be a physician, but a class on linguistics made him change course. He graduated in 1998 and moved to Cambridge, Massachusetts. Here he joined the laboratory of Ted Gibson in the Department of Brain and Cognitive Sciences at the Massachusetts Institute of Technology. In 2002 Watson earned his doctoral degree. His research considered intonational phrasing (that is, sections of spoken text with a particular intonation patterns) in language comprehension. Watson was a postdoctoral researcher at the University of Rochester, where he worked with Michael Tanenhaus.

== Research and career ==
He joined the University of Illinois at Urbana–Champaign in 2005, where he established a laboratory that investigates the cognitive processes that underpin language and nonverbal communication. He has studied how gesture and emphasis influence long-term communication. This includes analysing how disfluencies impact listener's interpretation of speakers' intentions. As part of this effort, Watson designed an experiment where participants listened to Lewis Carroll's Alice's Adventures in Wonderland. Half of the listeners heard the true version of the story and the other half heard a version with disfluencies (such as ums and uhs), and they were asked to retell the chapters after hearing them. Watson showed the people who had heard the stories with disfluencies were better at remembering the story. To ensure that the only reason people recalled the story better was because they were given more time to hear it, he compared the difference between disfluencies (the ums and uhs) and similarly timed coughs. He showed that disfluencies did not only provide more time for processing, but also helped people interpret what they were hearing. They often serve to provide structure to a story, occurring at a major plot junction.

In 2016 Watson joined Vanderbilt University, where he leads the Communication and Language Laboratory (CaLL). CaLL investigate prosody, the patterns and rhythm of spoken word, individual differences in language processing and how language is produced.

=== Academic service ===
Watson was appointed chair-elect of the governing board of the Psychonomic Society in 2019. He serves as associate editor of the Journal of Experimental Psychology: Learning, Memory, and Cognition. Watson founded the SPARK society, an organisation that looks to support scientists of colour to become innovators in cognitive science. He was promoted to Frank W. Mayborn Chair in 2020.

== Select publications ==
Watson, Duane G. (2012). Experimental and Theoretical Advances in Prosody : a Special Issue of Language and Cognitive Processes. Taylor and Francis. ISBN 978-1-135-84880-4. OCLC 821176237.

Watson, Duane; Gibson, Edward (2004). "The relationship between intonational phrasing and syntactic structure in language production". Language and Cognitive Processes. 19 (6): 713–755. doi:10.1080/01690960444000070. ISSN 0169-0965. S2CID 18358170.

Watson, Duane; Tanenhaus, Michael; Gunlogson, Christine (2008). "Interpreting Pitch Accents in Online Comprehension: H* vs. L+H*". Cognitive Science. 32 (7): 1232–1244. doi:10.1080/03640210802138755. ISSN 0364-0213. PMID 21585451.

== Personal life ==
Watson is married with four children.
