= Natalie Schilling =

American sociolinguist

- Education: University of North Carolina at Chapel Hill (BA, PhD); North Carolina State University (MA)
- Known for: Documentation of High Tider English; sociolinguistic fieldwork methodology
- Awards: Fellow of the Linguistic Society of America (2022)
- Scientific career
- Fields: Sociolinguistics, forensic linguistics
- Workplaces: Georgetown University
- Thesis: The Linguistic and Sociolinguistic Status of /ay/ in Outer Banks English (1996)

Natalie A. Schilling (also known as Natalie Schilling-Estes) is an American sociolinguist and Professor Emerita in the Department of Linguistics at Georgetown University.

Schilling received her BA and PhD from the University of North Carolina at Chapel Hill and her MA from North Carolina State University. Her 1996 PhD dissertation is entitled The Linguistic and Sociolinguistic Status of /ay/ in Outer Banks English.

She is an expert in sociolinguistics and forensic linguistics. In collaboration with Walt Wolfram, she played an important role in documenting the High Tider variety of North Carolina English. She has also led a long-running study of dialect change on Smith Island, Maryland, and serves as principal investigator on a sociolinguistic study of language and communication in the Washington, D.C. metropolitan area. As a forensic linguist, she has consulted on criminal cases involving speaker profiling and authorship attribution; fictionalized characters based on her have appeared in the TV shows Criminal Minds and Manhunt.

Schilling is co-Editor-in-Chief of the Wiley journal Language and Linguistics Compass and recorded the audio/video course English in America: A Linguistic History for The Great Courses in 2016.

In 2022, she was elected a fellow of the Linguistic Society of America.

== Selected publications ==
- Wolfram, Walt & Natalie Schilling-Estes. 1997. Hoi Toide on the Outer Banks: The Story of the Ocracoke Brogue. University of North Carolina Press. ISBN 978-0-8078-4626-1
- Schilling, Natalie. 2013. Sociolinguistic Fieldwork. Cambridge University Press. ISBN 978-0-521-12796-7
- Chambers, J. K. & Natalie Schilling (eds.). 2013. The Handbook of Language Variation and Change, 2nd ed. Wiley-Blackwell. ISBN 978-0-470-65994-6
- Wolfram, Walt & Natalie Schilling. 2016. American English: Dialects and Variation, 3rd ed. Wiley-Blackwell. ISBN 978-1-118-39022-1
