= Ellen Broselow =

American linguist

Ellen Broselow (born 1949) is an experimental linguist specializing in second language acquisition and phonology. Since 1983, she has been on the faculty of SUNY Stony Brook University, where she has held the position of Professor of Linguistics since 1993.

== Education and research ==
Broselow received her PhD in linguistics from the Department of Linguistics at the University of Massachusetts Amherst in 1976, with a dissertation entitled The Phonology of Egyptian Arabic. She held a number of academic positions in linguistics before joining the faculty of SUNY-Stony Brook in 1983.

Broselow's research has focused on what sorts of mistakes second language learners make in perception and production in phonology, as well as loanword adaptation. She has authored a number of widely cited articles on phenomena such as syllable structure, stress-epenthesis interactions, and syllable weight. Her work is known for combining experimental methods and theoretical models in order to formulate novel research hypotheses.

== Honors and service ==
She is a Fellow of the Linguistic Society of America, and is a former (1989-2002) associate editor of the journal Natural Language and Linguistic Theory.

She was a long time member of the Linguistic Society of America's COGEL (formerly COSWL) committee.

== Selected publications ==
- Broselow, E. and Y. Kang. 2013. Second language phonology and speech. In J. Herschensohn and M. Young-Scholten (eds.) The Cambridge Handbook of Second Language Acquisition, 529–554. Cambridge: Cambridge University Press.
- Broselow, E. 2009. Stress adaptation in loanword phonology: perception and learnability. In P. Boersma and S. Hamann (eds.) Phonology in Perception, 191–234. Berlin and New York: Mouton de Gruyter.
- Broselow, E. 2003. Marginal phonology: phonotactics on the edge. The Linguistic Review 20, 159–193.
- Broselow, E. 1995. The skeletal tier and moras. In J. Goldsmith (ed.) A Handbook of Phonological Theory, 175–205. Oxford: Blackwell Publishers.
- Broselow, E. and D. Finer. 1991. Parameter setting in second language phonology and syntax. Second Language Research 7, 35–59.
