= Exoskeletal model =

Generative framework in morphology

The exoskeletal model in linguistics, or XSM, is a generative framework in morphology and morphosyntax, introduced in the work of Hagit Borer, professor of linguistics at the Queen Mary University of London and previously professor of linguistics at University of Southern California. The main idea of the Exoskeletal Model is that Lexical items do not have a syntactic category. Rather, they take on whatever syntactic category is imposed on them by their syntactic context.

The framework is detailed in Borer's two 2005 books In Name Only and The Normal Course of Events, part of a trilogy entitled Structuring Sense, and a number of her and others' papers in morphosyntax.

The main idea of the exoskeletal model is a divorce between the structure and the lexicon, but a strong correspondence between structure and meaning. Words in isolation have no syntactic category, it is only when they appear in a structure that they acquire these categories. More specifically, words in and of themselves are not nouns or verbs, nouns are not themselves mass or count, and verbs are not themselves telic or atelic. Rather it is the noun phrase (DP) as a whole that is mass or count, and the verb phrase (VP) that is telic or atelic. The framework is implemented so that it avoids type-shifting and lexical ambiguity.

== Selected bibliography ==
- Borer, H. (2005a). In Name Only. Structuring Sense, Volume I. Oxford: Oxford University Press.
- Borer, H. (2005b). The Normal Course of Events. Structuring Sense, Volume II. Oxford: Oxford University Press.
- Borer, H. 2003. "Exo-skeletal vs. Endo-skeletal Explanations: Syntactic Projections and the Lexicon," M. Polinsky and J. Moore (eds.) The Nature of Explanation. Chicago: Chicago University Press
- De Belder, M. (2008). Size matters: Towards a syntactic decomposition of countability. In Abner, Natasha & Jason Bishop (eds.) Proceedings of the 27th West Coast Conference on Formal Linguistics. Cascadilla Proceedings Project, Somerville
- Bale, A. and H. Khanjian (2009). Classifiers and number marking. Proceedings of Semantics and Linguistic Theory (SALT) XVIII.
- Park, S.Y. (2009). Functional Categories: the syntax of DP and DegP, VDM
