= Hagit Borer =

American linguist

Hagit Borer (born 1952) FBA is a professor of linguistics at Queen Mary University of London. Her research falls within the area of Generative Grammar.

Borer also is an activist for the rights of Palestinians in the Israeli–Palestinian conflict.

== Life and work ==
Hagit Borer was born in Israel. Disillusioned with the Israeli government and with Zionism, she left for the United States in 1977. She became a US citizen in 1992.

Borer earned her PhD in linguistics in 1981 at the Massachusetts Institute of Technology, where she was a student of Noam Chomsky. She has held academic positions at University of California, Irvine and University of Massachusetts Amherst prior to her hire at the University of Southern California in 1997. In 2012 she moved to the UK to take a position as a Professor of Linguistics at Queen Mary University of London.

Her theoretical approach shifts the computational load from words to syntactic structure, and pursues the consequences of this shift in morphosyntax, in language acquisition, in the syntax-semantics interface, and in syntactic inter-language variation. She initiated the Exoskeletal Model, which implements this idea. She is the author of several books in linguistics, including the three books (Borer 2005a,b, 2013) which outline the workings of the Exoskeletal Model in nominals, in event structure, and in morphology.

In 2014, Borer was elected Fellow of the Linguistic Society of America. In July 2018 she was elected Fellow of the British Academy (FBA).

== Politics ==
Borer has been a member of various organizations and campaigns which advocate peace with justice in the Middle East, and which protest the Israeli occupation and Israeli violations of human rights. She has lectured extensively and has written on the Israeli-Palestinian conflict, and on Palestinian solidarity activism.

Borer was a passenger on the vessel Audacity of Hope, a member of the 2011 Freedom Flotilla II which, sailing from Greece, attempted to break the Israeli Blockade of the Gaza Strip. Fellow passengers included Hedy Epstein and Alice Walker. Before the voyage, the Los Angeles Times carried an op-ed by Borer in which she explained her motivation and wrote that "a society built on conquest and dispossession would have to dehumanize the conquered in order to continue to dispossess and oppress them" and "We wish to say to the Palestinians that, yes, there are people in Israel who know that any viable future for the Middle East must be based on a just peace – not the forced imposition spelled out by Netanyahu to Congress – or else we are all doomed."

After the voyage, she stated that the Greek commandos who took the ship and forced it back to a Greek port "arrived with machine guns. It was quite scary. They seemed ready for a fight. The commandos looked threatening, they wore helmets and their faces were covered."

In October 2012, Borer travelled with Noam Chomsky and a group of other colleagues to Gaza in order to attend a linguistics conference at the Islamic University of Gaza. Following that trip, they all co-signed a statement entitled Nous accusons... on how the mainstream media allegedly fails to report on Israeli atrocities against civilians in Gaza, also published in French.

== Selected publications ==
- Borer, H. (2013). Taking Form. Structuring Sense, Volume III. Oxford: Oxford University Press.
- Borer, H. (2005a). In Name Only. Structuring Sense, Volume I. Oxford: Oxford University Press.
- Borer, H. (2005b). The Normal Course of Events. Structuring Sense, Volume II. Oxford: Oxford University Press.
- Borer, H. (1986). The Syntax of Pronominal Clitics, Syntax and Semantics Vol. 19, ed. New York: Academic Press.
- Borer, H. (1984). Parametric Syntax: Case Studies in Semitic and Romance Languages. Dordrecht: Foris Publications.
- Borer, H. and J. Aoun. (1981). Theoretical Issues in the Grammar of Semitic Languages, eds. MITWPL, Vol. 3. Cambridge: Department of Linguistics, MIT

== See also ==
- Joseph E. Aoun
- Generative linguistics
- Jews for Justice for Palestinians
