= Janna Oetting =

Speech-language pathologist

- Born: 1964 (age 61–62)
- Occupations: Professor of Communication Sciences and Disorders
- Awards: ASHA Fellow 2005; LSHA Honors, 2007; Jeannette-Laguaite, 2008; LSU Rainmaker, 2009; ASHA Diversity Champion, 2009

Academic background
- Education: Augustana College (B.A.), University of Kansas (M.A., Ph.D.)

Academic work
- Discipline: Speech-language pathology
- Institutions: Louisiana State University
- Main interests: Cross-dialectal studies of childhood language development and developmental language impairment

Janna Beth Oetting (born 1964) is an American researcher and speech-language pathologist specializing in the cross-dialectal study of childhood language development and developmental language disorders.

== Education ==
Oetting received a BA in Speech-Language Pathology from Augustana College in 1986. In 1988, Oetting completed an MA in Speech-Language Pathology, at the University of Kansas. She earned her Ph.D. in Child Language from the same university in 1992 under the supervision of Mabel Rice. Oetting’s dissertation, “Language-impaired and normally developing children's acquisition of English plural,” examined the plural systems of children with and without specific language impairment and showed evidence of dualistic representation of this grammar structure in both groups, even though the children with SLI showed limited productivity of regular plural marking.

== Career and research ==
Oetting is the Professor in the Department of Communication Sciences and Disorders at Louisiana State University. She directs the D4 Child Language Lab, which supports research on language Development and Disorders across Dialects of English to reduce Disparities in health and education among children.

Oetting’s research largely focuses on understanding the nature of childhood language disorders within various dialects of English, including African American English, Southern White English, and Cajun English; this work has been funded by grants from the National Institute of Health.

Oetting was the Editor of Language for the Journal of Speech, Language, and Hearing Research between 2010-2012.

== Honours and awards ==
Oetting was inducted as a Fellow of the American Speech-Language-Hearing Association in 2005. She was inducted as Fellow of the Louisiana Speech-Language-Hearing Association in 2005, received Honors and the Jeannette-Laguaite Award from this association in 2007 and 2008, and served as Vice-President and President of this association in 2001 and 2002.

== Biography ==
The first of four children, Janna Beth Oetting was born in 1964 in Seward, Nebraska, to Bob and Carol Oetting.

== Selected publications ==
- Oetting, Janna B.; McDonald, Janet L.; Seidel, Christy M.; Hegarty, Michael (2016). "Sentence Recall by Children with SLI Across Two Nonmainstream Dialects of English". Journal of Speech, Language, and Hearing Research. 59 (1): 183–194. doi:10.1044/2015_JSLHR-L-15-0036. PMC 4867930. PMID 26501934.
- Oetting, Janna B.; Gregory, Kyomi D.; Rivière, Andrew M. (2016). "Changing How Speech-Language Pathologists Think and Talk About Dialect Variation". Perspectives of the ASHA Special Interest Groups. 1 (16): 28–37. doi:10.1044/persp1.SIG16.28. PMC 9590657. PMID 36285288.
- Newkirk-Turner, Brandi L.; Oetting, Janna B.; Stockman, Ida J. (2016). "Development of Auxiliaries in Young Children Learning African American English". Language, Speech, and Hearing Services in Schools. 47 (3): 209–224. doi:10.1044/2016_LSHSS-15-0063. PMID 27309386.
- Oetting, J. B. & Hadley, P. (2017). Morphosyntax in child language disorders. In. R. G. Schwartz (Ed.). The Handbook of Child Language Disorders (2nd ed., pp. 365–391). New York, NY: Psychological Press.
- Berry, Jessica R.; Oetting, Janna B. (2017). "Dialect Variation of Copula and Auxiliary Verb BE: African American English–Speaking Children with and Without Gullah/Geechee Heritage". Journal of Speech, Language, and Hearing Research. 60 (9): 2557–2568. doi:10.1044/2017_JSLHR-L-16-0120. PMC 5831619. PMID 28796859.
- McDonald, Janet L.; Seidel, Christy M.; Hammarlund, Rebecca; Oetting, Janna B. (2018). "Working memory performance in children with and without specific language impairment in two nonmainstream dialects of English". Applied Psycholinguistics. 39: 145–167. doi:10.1017/S0142716417000509. PMC 12349907.
- Oetting, Janna B. (2018). "Prologue: Toward Accurate Identification of Developmental Language Disorder within Linguistically Diverse Schools". Language, Speech, and Hearing Services in Schools. 49 (2): 213–217. doi:10.1044/2018_LSHSS-CLSLD-17-0156. PMID 29621801.
- Gregory, Kyomi D.; Oetting, Janna B. (2018). "Classification Accuracy of Teacher Ratings when Screening Nonmainstream English-Speaking Kindergartners for Language Impairment in the Rural South". Language, Speech, and Hearing Services in Schools. 49 (2): 218–231. doi:10.1044/2017_LSHSS-17-0045. PMC 6105134. PMID 29621802.
- Rivière, Andrew M.; Oetting, Janna B.; Roy, Joseph (2018). "Effects of Specific Language Impairment on a Contrastive Dialect Structure: The Case of Infinitival TO Across Various Nonmainstream Dialects of English". Journal of Speech, Language, and Hearing Research. 61 (8): 1989–2001. doi:10.1044/2018_JSLHR-L-17-0209. PMC 6198920. PMID 30073252.
- Oetting, J. B. (2019). Variability within varieties of language: Profiles of typicality and impairment. Selected Proceedings of the 7th Generative Approaches to Language Acquisition - North America Conference (pp. 59–82). Philadelphia, PA: John Benjamins.
- McDonald, Janet L.; Oetting, Janna B. (2019). "Nonword Repetition Across Two Dialects of English: Effects of Specific Language Impairment and Nonmainstream Form Density". Journal of Speech, Language, and Hearing Research. 62 (5): 1381–1391. doi:10.1044/2018_JSLHR-L-18-0253. PMC 6808320. PMID 31046563.
- Oetting, Janna B.; Berry, Jessica R.; Gregory, Kyomi D.; Rivière, Andrew M.; McDonald, Janet (2019). "Specific Language Impairment in African American English and Southern White English: Measures of Tense and Agreement with Dialect-Informed Probes and Strategic Scoring". Journal of Speech, Language, and Hearing Research. 62 (9): 3443–3461. doi:10.1044/2019_JSLHR-L-19-0089. PMC 6808338. PMID 31525131. S2CID 202641577.
