= Diane Lillo-Martin =

American linguist

Diane Lillo-Martin is a Board of Trustees Distinguished Professor of Linguistics at the University of Connecticut. She is currently the Director of the university's Cognitive Sciences Program as well as its Coordinator of American Sign Language Studies. She spent 12 years as Head of the Department of Linguistics at the University of Connecticut.

== Research ==
Lillo-Martin received her PhD in 1986 from the University of California, San Diego, under the supervision of Edward Klima.

She has become an eminent scholar in the fields of Monolingual and Bilingual First Language Acquisition and the Structure and Acquisition of American Sign Language. Her research focuses on what first language acquisition of sign languages can tell us about language universals and how the human mind comes prepared to learn language.

Lillo-Martin is the board chair of the Sign Language Linguistics Society and a senior scientist at Haskins Laboratories. She is a Fellow of the Linguistic Society of America.

She is the former editor-in-chief of the journal Language Acquisition. She sat on the linguistics panel of the National Science Foundation and was a review panel member and chair of the Language and Communication Study Section (LCOM) for the National Institutes of Health.

== Major publications ==
Lillo-Martin's research has been published in and reviewed in numerous peer-reviewed journals and academic presses.

=== Books ===
- Sandler, Wendy & Lillo-Martin, Diane (2006). Sign Language and Linguistic Universals.Cambridge: Cambridge University Press.
- Crain, Stephen & Lillo-Martin, Diane (1999). Linguistic Theory and Language Acquisition. Oxford: Blackwell.
- Marschark, Marc, Siple, Patricia, Lillo-Martin, Diane, Campbell, Ruth, & Everhart, Victoria S. (1997). Relations of Language and Thought: The View from Sign Language and Deaf Children. New York: Oxford University Press.
- Lillo-Martin, Diane (1991). Universal Grammar and American Sign Language: Setting the Null Argument Parameters. Dordrecht: Kluwer Academic Publishers.

=== Journal articles and book chapters ===
- Berk, Stephanie & Lillo-Martin, Diane (2012). The Two-Word Stage: Motivated by Linguistic or Cognitive Constraints? Cognitive Psychology 65, 118-140.
- Lillo-Martin, Diane (2009). Sign language acquisition studies. In Edith L. Bavin (Ed.), The Cambridge Handbook of Child Language, 399-415. New York: Cambridge University Press.
- Lillo-Martin, Diane (2001). One syntax or two? Sign language and syntactic theory. Glot International 5.9-10, 297-310.
- Lillo-Martin, Diane (1997). The acquisition of English by deaf signers: Is Universal Grammar involved? In Suzanne Flynn, Gita Martohardjono, & Wayne O’Neil (Eds.), The Generative Study of Second Language Acquisition, 131-149. Mahwah, NJ: Lawrence Erlbaum Associates.
