= Linguistics and Philosophy =

- Discipline: Semantics
- Language: English
- Edited by: Michael Glanzberg, Yael Sharvit

Publication details
- History: Jan. 1977 to present
- Publisher: Springer Science+Business Media (Netherlands)

Standard abbreviations
- ISO 4: Linguist. Philos.

Indexing
- ISSN: 0165-0157 (print); 1573-0549 (web)

Links
- Journal homepage

Linguistics and Philosophy is a peer-reviewed journal which publishes work addressing meaning and structure in natural language. It is one of four top journals in formal semantics, alongside Natural Language Semantics, the Journal of Semantics, and Semantics and Pragmatics. Papers in the journal tend to emphasize concerns shared by linguists and philosophers, and are intended to be accessible to readers from both fields.

The journal is a continuation of the earlier Foundations of Language which had been founded by Frits Staal in order to encourage interaction between linguists, philosophers, and logicians. The current editors-in-chief are philosopher Michael Glanzberg (Rutgers University) and linguist Yael Sharvit (UCLA).
