= Liina Pylkkänen =

Finnish philologist, linguist, and academic

- Education: Massachusetts Institute of Technology; University of Pittsburgh; University of Tampere
- Scientific career
- Workplaces: New York University
- Thesis: Introducing arguments (2002)

Liina Pylkkänen is a Professor of Linguistics and Psychology at New York University. Her research considers the neurobiology of language and theoretical linguistics.

== Early life and education ==
Pylkkänen grew up in Tampere, Finland. Pylkkänen studied philology at the University of Tampere. She was an undergraduate exchange student at the University of Pittsburgh, and decided to move there for her graduate studies. In 1997 she joined Massachusetts Institute of Technology as a doctoral researcher. Her doctorate explored verbal argument structure and cross-linguistic variations in introducing arguments. She joined New York University as a postdoctoral fellow in 2002.

== Research and career ==
Pylkkänen was appointed to the faculty at New York University in 2004, where she was promoted to Professor in 2016. She studies the combinatory potential of human language. She combines semantic theories and computational work with magnetoencephalography and functional magnetic resonance imaging. Her early work considered the syntax–semantics interface, with a particular focus on grammar.

She became interested in the neural mechanisms that are responsible for the combinatorics of language and syntactic structure building. Her research showed that human brains routinely combine words from different languages, showing that people who are bilingual naturally switch between languages because their combinatory mechanisms do not see the language as different.

Pylkkänen has studied how brains process language expressing facts compared to language expressing possibilities. She showed that factual language resulted in a rapid increase in brain activity, whilst scenarios conveying possibility resulted in a much less robust response.

== Select publications ==
- Liina Pylkkänen; Alec Marantz (1 May 2003). "Tracking the time course of word recognition with MEG". Trends in Cognitive Sciences. 7 (5): 187–189. doi:10.1016/s1364-6613(03)00092-5. ISSN 1364-6613. PMID 12757816. Wikidata Q50764985.
- David Poeppel; Karen Emmorey; Gregory Hickok; Liina Pylkkänen (1 October 2012). "Towards a new neurobiology of language" (PDF). The Journal of Neuroscience. 32 (41): 14125–14131. doi:10.1523/jneurosci.3244-12.2012. ISSN 0270-6474. PMC 3495005. PMID 23055482. Wikidata Q24614814.
- Douglas K Bemis; Liina Pylkkänen (1 February 2011). "Simple composition: a magnetoencephalography investigation into the comprehension of minimal linguistic phrases" (PDF). The Journal of Neuroscience. 31 (8): 2801–2814. doi:10.1523/jneurosci.5003-10.2011. ISSN 0270-6474. PMC 6623787. PMID 21414902. S2CID 12479545. Wikidata Q38493289.
