= Kai von Fintel =

German linguist

Kai von Fintel is a German linguist and professor of linguistics at the Massachusetts Institute of Technology. Von Fintel is the co-founding editor of the journal Semantics and Pragmatics and served as the co-editor from its founding in 2007 until 2019.

== Education ==
After graduating from de:Wilhelm-Hittorf-Gymnasium in 1981 with a degree in mathematics and chemistry, von Fintel studied at the University of Münster, University of Köln, and received both his M.A. and PhD from University of Massachusetts at Amherst in 1994.
