= Lisa Green (linguist) =

American linguist

- Education: Grambling State University (B.S.); University of Kentucky (M.A.); University of Massachusetts, Amherst (Ph.D.)
- Scientific career
- Institutions: University of Massachusetts, Amherst
- Thesis: Topics in African American English: The verb system analysis (1993)
- Website: people.umass.edu/lisag

Dr. Lisa Green is a linguist specializing in syntax and African American English (AAE). She is a professor in the Department of Linguistics at the University of Massachusetts, Amherst. In July 2020 she was awarded the title of Distinguished Professor.

== Education ==
Before beginning her graduate studies in linguistics, Green received a B.S. in English education at Grambling State University and then an M.A. in English at the University of Kentucky. Green then went on to receive a Ph.D. in linguistics from the University of Massachusetts, Amherst in 1993.

== Career and research ==
After completing her Ph.D., Green spent 11 years at the University of Texas at Austin in the Department of Linguistics, before going on to take up a position in the Department of Linguistics at the University of Massachusetts, Amherst. There she founded and directs the Center for the Study of African American Language, a resource for students and educators dedicated to dialect and language-related issues. An enduring goal of Green's is to dispel notions of AAE as a substandard linguistic variety by demonstrating its systematic nature.

Green's work has focused on linguistic variation between different dialects of English, with a primary focus on African American English. Her research focuses on morphosyntactic systems in African American English like tense and aspect marking and negation, as well as first language acquisition of AAE by child speakers.

== Honors and awards ==
Green was inducted as a Fellow of the Linguistic Society of America in 2016.

== Selected publications ==
=== Books ===
- Green, Lisa. (2011). Language and the African American Child. Cambridge University Press. ISBN 9780511975561.
- Green, Lisa. (2002). African American English: A Linguistic Introduction. Cambridge University Press. ISBN 9780521891387.

=== Selected papers ===
- Green, Lisa, & Walter Sistrunk (2015). Syntax and Semantics. In Oxford Handbook of African American Language. Sonja Lanehart (ed.). Oxford University Press.
- Green, Lisa. (2014). Force, Focus, and Negation in African American English. In Micro-syntactic Variation in North American English. Raffaella Zanuttini and Laurence R. Horn (eds.). Oxford University Press.
- Green, Lisa, & Tom Roeper (2007). The Acquisition Path for Aspect: Remote Past and Habitual in Child African American English.” Language Acquisition. 269-313.
- Green, Lisa (2000). “Aspectual Be-Type Constructions and Coercion in African American English.”Natural Language Semantics, 8, 1-25.
- Green, Lisa, Linda Bland-Stewart, & Harry Seymour (1998). Difference Versus Deficit in Child African American English. In Language, Speech, and Hearing Services in Schools. Vol 29 No. 2, p. 96 - 109.
