= Louise McNally =

American linguist

Academic background
- Education: University of California, Santa Cruz (PhD)
- Doctoral advisor: William Ladusaw

Academic work
- Discipline: Linguistics
- Sub-discipline: Semantics, Pragmatics, Syntax
- Website: UPF faculty page

Louise McNally (born 1965) is a linguist and professor in the Department of Translation and Language Sciences at Universitat Pompeu Fabra (UPF). She researches semantics and pragmatics and their interfaces with syntax, in particular on areas including natural semantic ontology, scales, and reference.

== Biography ==
McNally earned her PhD in linguistics at UC Santa Cruz in 1992 with a dissertation entitled, "A Semantics for the English Existential Construction," which was published in Garland's Outstanding Dissertations in Linguistics series in 1997 (and republished by Routledge/Taylor Francis in 2016).

She worked at Indiana University Bloomington from 1992 until 1994, and then briefly at The Ohio State University and UC San Diego, before taking up her current position at UPF in 1995.

== Awards and honors ==
In 2017, McNally was awarded the Humboldt Prize.

In 2022, McNally was elected to the Academia Europaea.

In 2025, McNally was elected as a Fellow of the Linguistic Society of America.

McNally serves as co-Editor-in-Chief with Kjell Johan Sæbø of the Linguistic Society of America's open access journal Semantics and Pragmatics (S&P).

== Selected publications ==
- Kennedy, Christopher; McNally, Louise (2005). "Scale Structure, Degree Modification, and the Semantics of Gradable Predicates". Language. 81 (2): 345–381. doi:10.1353/lan.2005.0071. hdl:10230/23158. ISSN 0097-8507. JSTOR 4489896. S2CID 16677059.
- McNally, Louise (1997). A Semantics for the English Existential Construction. Taylor & Francis. ISBN 978-0-8153-2557-4.
- Culicover, Peter; McNally, Louise (1997). The Limits of Syntax. Brill. ISBN 978-90-04-37316-7.
- McNally, Louise (1998). "Existential Sentences without Existential Quantification". Linguistics and Philosophy. 21 (4): 353–392. doi:10.1023/A:1005389330615. hdl:10230/23159. ISSN 0165-0157. JSTOR 25001712. S2CID 60578021.
