= Language and Linguistics Compass =

- Discipline: Linguistics
- Language: English
- Edited by: Edwin Battistella, Natalie Schilling

Publication details
- History: 2007–present
- Publisher: Wiley
- Frequency: Bimonthly
- Open access: Hybrid
- Impact factor: 2.8 (2023)

Standard abbreviations
- ISO 4: Lang. Linguist. Compass

Indexing
- ISSN: 1749-818X
- LCCN: 2008252161
- OCLC no.: 173252278

Links
- Journal homepage; Online access; online archive

Language and Linguistics Compass is a bimonthly peer-reviewed academic journal covering linguistics. It was established in 2006 and publishes review articles. The editors-in-chief are Edwin Battistella (Southern Oregon University) and Natalie Schilling (Georgetown University).

== Abstracting and indexing ==
The journal is abstracted and indexed in:

- EBSCO databases
- Emerging Sources Citation Index
- Index Islamicus
- Linguistic Bibliography
- PsycINFO
- Scopus

According to the Journal Citation Reports, the journal has a 2023 impact factor of 2.8.
