= David M. Perlmutter =

American linguist (born 1938)

David M. Perlmutter (born 1938) is an American linguist and professor emeritus in Linguistics at the University of California, San Diego. He is a fellow of the American Academy of Arts and Sciences and the Linguistic Society of America and served as president of the Linguistic Society in 2000.

Perlmutter received a PhD in 1968 at MIT under Noam Chomsky with a thesis titled Deep and surface constraints in syntax.
