= Sandra Chung =

American linguist

Academic background
- Education: Harvard University (AB, PhD)

Academic work
- Discipline: Linguist
- Sub-discipline: Austronesian languages; Syntax; Semantics; Agreement; Wh-movement
- Institutions: University of California, Santa Cruz

Sandra Chung is an American linguist and distinguished professor emerita at the Department of Linguistics at the University of California, Santa Cruz. Her research focuses on Austronesian languages and syntax.

== Education ==
Chung earned her A.B. and, in 1976, a Ph.D. at Harvard University, with a dissertation on the comparative syntax of Polynesian languages.

== Career ==
At the University of California, Santa Cruz, she has served as chair of the Linguistics Department (1994–97, 2013–16), chair of the Philosophy Department (2002–04), and Faculty Assistant to the Executive Vice Chancellor (2004–11).

Chung has made contributions to the study of syntax and semantics. Much of her data comes from her own work with Chamorro speakers both in the continental U.S. and in Saipan. She has also worked on Māori. On the basis of Māori and Chamorro, she and William Ladusaw argued in Restriction and Saturation (MIT Press, 2003) that the number and kind of semantic combinatoric operations must be expanded beyond the typically assumed function application and abstraction. Her other theoretical work has addressed topics in agreement, predicate-initial word orders, wh-movement, ellipsis (especially sluicing), and on wh-agreement (where she demonstrated that Chamorro shows overt morphological cues to Wh-movement), among many others.

== Honors ==
In 2007, Chung was selected as a Fellow of the Linguistic Society of America. She was invited to give a plenary lecture at the annual meeting of the Linguistic Society of America in 2008, where she spoke about combining primary (including documentary) research on understudied languages with theoretical linguistics, arguing that these two often competing interests can and should find a congenial home together. In 2011, Chung served as president of the Linguistic Society of America. Chung was elected a fellow of the American Association for the Advancement of Science in 2012.

A Festschrift in her honor, Asking the Right Questions: Essays in Honor of Sandra Chung, was published in 2017.

== Books ==
- 2020. Chamorro Grammar. eScholarship: Open Access Publications from the University of California. xxii + 728 pages. http://dx.doi.org/10.48330/E2159R
- 2006. Estreyas Marianas: Chamorro. Tinige': Joaquin Flores Borja, Manuel Flores Borja, yan Sandra Chung. Saipan, CNMI: Estreyas Marianas Publications. 145 pages.
- 2003. (co-authored with William A. Ladusaw) Restriction and Saturation. Linguistic Inquiry Monograph 42. Cambridge, Mass.: MIT Press. xiv + 173 pages.
- 1998. The Design of Agreement: Evidence from Chamorro. Chicago and London: The University of Chicago Press. xii + 423 pages. (paperback edition, 2000)
- 1978. Case Marking and Grammatical Relations in Polynesian. Austin, TX: University of Texas Press. 401 pages.

== See also ==
- Chamorro
