= Natural Language and Linguistic Theory =

Natural Language & Linguistic Theory
- Discipline: Theoretical linguistics
- Language: English
- Edited by: Daniel Harbour

Publication details
- History: 1983-present
- Publisher: Springer Science+Business Media
- Frequency: Quarterly
- Impact factor: 1.1 (2024)

Standard abbreviations
- ISO 4: Nat. Lang. Linguist. Theory

Indexing
- ISSN: 0167-806X (print); 1573-0859 (web)
- JSTOR: 0167806X
- OCLC no.: 863227917

Links
- Journal homepage; Online archive

Natural Language & Linguistic Theory is a quarterly peer-reviewed academic journal covering theoretical and generative linguistics. It was established in 1983 and originally published by Kluwer Academic Publishers. Since 2004 the journal is published by Springer Science+Business Media. Since 2024, the editor-in-chief has been Daniel Harbour (QMUL).

The journal carries a "Topic-Comment" column (initiated by Geoffrey K. Pullum), in which a contributor presents a personal, sometimes controversial, opinion on some aspect of the field.

== Abstracting and indexing ==
The journal is abstracted and indexed in:

- Academic OneFile
- Arts & Humanities Citation Index
- Bibliographie linguistique/Linguistic bibliography
- Current Contents/Social & Behavioral Sciences
- Current Contents/Arts and Humanities
- EBSCO databases
- FRANCIS
- International Bibliography of Periodical Literature
- MLA International Bibliography
- PASCAL
- ProQuest databases
- Scopus
- Social Sciences Citation Index

According to the Journal Citation Reports, the journal has a 2024 impact factor of 1.1.
