= Jeffrey Lidz =

Linguistics professor

Academic background
- Education: University of Delaware
- Thesis: Dimensions of Reflexivity (1996)
- Doctoral advisor: Peter Cole

Academic work
- Discipline: Linguistics
- Sub-discipline: Syntax; Language Acquisition
- Institutions: University of Maryland, College Park; Northwestern University

Jeffrey Lidz is a linguistics professor at the University of Maryland, College Park, currently serving as chair of the linguistics department. His research focuses on syntactic aspects of language acquisition.

== Career ==
Lidz received his PhD from the University of Delaware in 1996 and held postdoctoral fellowships at the University of Pennsylvania and Laboratoire de Sciences Cognitives et Psycholinguistique from 1997 to 2000 and in 1998, respectively. As a postdoc at UPenn, he studied Kannada, finding that despite its causative morpheme, two-year-olds acquiring Kannada rely on number of overt NPs when making judgements about novel word meanings. He worked as an assistant professor at Northwestern University from 2000 to 2005 before moving to the University of Maryland. Lidz was named a Maryland Distinguished Scholar-Teacher in 2015.

Much of Lidz's research focuses on the syntactic details of child language acquisition. His findings show evidence of significant syntactic development in 18-month-olds, including understandings of long-range dependency and parts of speech.

Articles by Lidz arguing for the necessity of Chomsky's theory of Universal Grammar have appeared in Scientific American and The Conversation. Lidz was the editor-in-chief for Language Acquisition from 2013 to 2020 and edited/co-authored the Oxford Handbook of Developmental Linguistics. Lidz was named a Fellow of the American Association for the Advancement of Science in 2024.
