= Angelika Kratzer =

American linguist

- Born: Mindelheim, Germany

Academic background
- Education: University of Konstanz
- Thesis: Semantik der Rede: Kontexttheorie, Modalwörter, Konditionalsätze (1979)

Academic work
- Discipline: Linguistics
- Sub-discipline: Semantics
- Website: people.umass.edu/kratzer/

Angelika Kratzer is a professor emerita of linguistics in the Department of Linguistics at the University of Massachusetts Amherst.

== Biography ==
She was born in Germany, and received her PhD from the University of Konstanz in 1979, with a dissertation entitled Semantik der Rede. She is an influential and widely cited semanticist whose expertise includes modals, conditionals, situation semantics, and a range of topics relating to the syntax–semantics interface.

Among her most influential ideas are: a unified analysis of modality of different flavors (building on the work of Jaakko Hintikka); a modal analysis of conditionals; and the hypothesis ("the little v hypothesis") that the agent argument of a transitive verb is introduced syntactically whereas the theme argument is selected for lexically.

She co-wrote with Irene Heim the semantics textbook Semantics in Generative Grammar, and is co-editor, with Irene Heim, of the journal Natural Language Semantics.

== Awards ==
In 2012, Kratzer was named a Fellow of the Linguistic Society of America.

== Selected publications ==
- Heim, Irene; Kratzer, Angelika (1998). Semantics in Generative Grammar (1 ed.). Malden, Mass.: Blackwell. ISBN 0631197125.
- Kratzer, Angelika (January 1977). "What 'must' and 'can' must and can mean". Linguistics and Philosophy. 1 (3): 337–355. doi:10.1007/BF00353453.
- Kratzer, Angelika (15 April 2008). "The notional category of modality". In Portner, Paul H.; Partee, Barbara H. (eds.). Formal Semantics: The Essential Readings. John Wiley & Sons. pp. 289–393. ISBN 978-0-470-75818-2.
- Kratzer, Angelika (2010). "Stage-Level and Individual-Level Predicates". In Carlson, Gregory N.; Pelletier, Francis Jeffry (eds.). The Generic Book (Digit. print. ed.). Chicago: Univ. of Chicago Press. pp. 125–175. ISBN 978-0226092911.
- Kratzer, Angelika (1996). "Severing the External Argument from its Verb". In Rooryck, J.; Zaring, L. (eds.). Phrase Structure and the Lexicon. Studies in Natural Language and Linguistic Theory. Vol. 33. Dordrecht: Springer. pp. 109–137. doi:10.1007/978-94-015-8617-7_5. ISBN 978-90-481-4621-5.
- Kratzer, Angelika (12 January 2012). Modals and Conditionals: New and Revised Perspectives. Oxford University Press. doi:10.1093/acprof:oso/9780199234684.001.0001. ISBN 978-0-19-173843-2.

== See also ==
- Formal semantics (linguistics)
- Generative grammar
- Modality (natural language)
- Modal logic
