= Carole Chaski =

American linguist (born 1955)

- Born: 1955 (age 70–71)
- Parent(s): Milton S. Chaski, Sr., Marylee (née Evans) Chaski

Academic background
- Education: Bryn Mawr College (A.B.); University of Delaware (M.Ed.); Brown University (PhD)
- Thesis: Syntactic theories and models of syntactic change: a study of Greek infinitival complementation (1988)

Academic work
- Discipline: Linguist
- Sub-discipline: Forensic linguistics
- Institutions: North Carolina State University

Carole Elisabeth Chaski (born 1955) is a forensic linguist who is considered one of the leading experts in the field. Her research has led to improvements in the methodology and reliability of stylometric analysis and inspired further research on the use of this approach for authorship identification. Her contributions have served as expert testimony in several federal and state court cases in the United States and Canada. She is president of ALIAS Technology and executive director of the Institute for Linguistic Evidence, a non-profit research organization devoted to linguistic evidence.

== Early life and education ==
Carole Chaski was born in 1955, one of six children of Milton S. Chaski, Sr., and Marylee (née Evans) Chaski. Chaski attended Severn School and graduated in 1973, where she earned awards for both English and Spanish proficiency.

Chaski earned her A.B. magna cum laude in English and Ancient Greek from Bryn Mawr College in 1975, and her M.Ed. in Psychology of Reading from the University of Delaware in 1981. Her 1988 Ph.D. dissertation in Linguistics at Brown University, Syntactic theories and models of syntactic change : a study of Greek infinitival complementation, was advised by Winthrop Francis.

== Career ==
While teaching linguistics at North Carolina State University (1990–1994), Carole Chaski was asked by police to examine several versions of an alleged suicide note found on a home computer. Using syntactic and statistical analysis, she concluded that the decedent was not the author of the note, and that a roommate likely was. The roommate later confessed. Chaski subsequently left teaching to work full-time as a forensic linguist.

Forensic Linguistics journal has called Chaski "the leading expert in the field of forensic linguistics". According to John Olsson and June Luchjenbroers, "Dr. Carole Chaski has pioneered the syntactic analysis of authorship."

In the undergraduate textbook Forensic Linguistics: Second Edition: An Introduction To Language, Crime and the Law, John Olsson wrote, "The first linguist to consider markedness in terms of authorship systematically was Carole Chaski, whose statistical analysis of syntax in authorship has met the Daubert challenge in the U.S. court system." Chaski's methodology, according to Olsson, includes software that uses four grammar rules to identify a text's syntactic markedness, in combination with measurements of the ways punctuation is used by a writer. Olsson continued, "Chaski should be credited with having brought forensic authorship comparison (as opposed to long text authorship 'attribution') into the scientific arena, and out of the darkness of literary criticism, canonical literary corpus construction and discourse analysis modes of authorship identification."

Chaski is known for her research on the reliability of different variables, such as spelling and syntax, in forensic linguists' analysis of discriminants amongst unknown authors. She concluded that many of the frequently measured variables, such as the numbers of spelling errors or prescriptive grammar errors in a sample, were not accurate ways of determining authorship or discriminating between suspected authors. Chaski's criticism was based on how the variation within many of these variables is reflective of dialects and not idiolects. Tim Grant and Kevin Baker have criticized Chaski's evaluation of the authorship markers, addressing issues with the reliability and validity of her methods for evaluating each marker. They also draw attention to Chaski's selection of authors, namely because they lack sociolinguistic diversity.

According to Lawrence Solan, former president of the International Association of Forensic Linguists, there is a cultural and intellectual divide in the profession, with Chaski advocating "scientific methodology that is replicable from case to case", and others, like James R. Fitzgerald, using "an 'intuitive' approach, examining among other things idiosyncrasies in spelling and word choice to see whether 'constellations of features emerge' ". After explaining Fitzgerald's analysis, calling it "forensic stylistics", Michelle Taylor of Forensic Magazine followed with a description of Chaski's style of analysis: "That form of language analysis, sometimes called forensic stylistics, is different from what Chaski does, as she has a formal education in linguistics and uses a computational linguistics method she developed called ALIAS, or Automated Linguistics Identification and Assessment System."

Ben Zimmer of The New York Times wrote that Chaski was also working on the problem of "identifying the authorship of a document that was produced by a computer to which multiple users had access" by developing software that could categorize the linguistic structures which tend to be stable across different styles of writing. In 2012 Jack Hitt of The New Yorker wrote of Chaski's work on a computer algorithm to identify syntactic patterns, citing Chaski's goal, "to develop a standard 'validated tool' that police, civil investigators, and linguists can turn to when testifying in crucial cases, such as a capital murder trial". Chaski's method also uses a database of linguistic samples.

As of 2016, Chaski served on the editorial board of Brief Chronicles, a peer reviewed journal of Shakespearean authorship studies that is no longer in production.

Chaski is the CEO and president of ALIAS Technology LLC, where she has continued her work in forensic computational linguistics. Additionally, she is a part of ALIAS Technology's "Linguist Support Team for SynAID, Profiler and other modules as cases warrant."

== Selected publications ==
- Who Wrote It? Steps Toward a Science of Author Identification. National Institute of Justice Journal, vol. 233, pp. 15–22 (1997).
- "Junk Science, Pre-Science and Developing Science" National Conference on Science and the Law Proceedings, 97-147 (1999).
- "Empirical Evaluations of Language-Based Author Identification Techniques" International Journal of Speech Language and the Law, 8:1 (2001).

A study on the reliability and validity of certain techniques used in forensic stylistics. Chaski was inspired to conduct the study because of the Court-decision made in United States v. Van Wyk.

- "Who’s At The Keyboard? Recent Results in Authorship Attribution," International Journal of Digital Evidence 4:1 (Spring 2005), 1-13 (2005).
- "The Keyboard Dilemma and Authorship Attribution," International Federation for Information Processing Volume 242, 133-146 (2007).

A study prescribing a method for authorship attribution in the case of documents that are sourced from computers which have multiple users.

=== Chapters in textbooks ===
- "Author Identification in the Forensic Setting," Oxford Handbook of Language and Law. (March 2012)
- "Forensic Linguistics, Authorship, Attribution, and Admissibility", in Forensic Science and Law: Investigative Applications in Criminal, Civil, and Family Justice (2005)
