= John Baugh =

American academic and linguist

- Born: December 10, 1949 (age 76)
- Occupations: Academic; linguist; professor
- Known for: Developing theory of linguistic profiling

Academic background
- Education: Temple University (B.A.); University of Pennsylvania (M.A., Ph.D.)
- Doctoral advisor: William Labov

Academic work
- Discipline: Linguistics
- Sub-discipline: Sociolinguistics; Forensic linguistics
- Institutions: Rice University; Washington University in St. Louis; Stanford University
- Website: profiles.rice.edu/faculty/john-baugh

John Gordon Baugh V (born December 10, 1949) is an American academic and linguist. His main areas of study are sociolinguistics, forensic linguistics, education, and African American language studies. He is currently the Barbara Jordan Distinguished Professor of Linguistics at Rice University, Professor Emeritus at Washington University in St. Louis, professor emeritus at Stanford University, and a former President of the Linguistic Society of America. In 2020 Baugh was elected as a fellow of the American Association for the Advancement of Science in the section on Linguistics and Language Sciences, and in 2021 he was elected to the American Academy of Arts and Sciences.

Baugh was previously a fellow of the Center for Advanced Study in the Behavioral Sciences at Stanford University and of the Rockefeller Foundation. He served as president of the American Dialect Society from 1992 to 1994 and as the Edward Sapir Professor during the 2019 Linguistic Society of America Summer Institute.

Baugh is best known for developing the theory of linguistic profiling, which occurs when someone's speech triggers discriminatory bias against them, such as when they are seeking employment or housing. As a result of this work, Baugh has served as an expert witness and consultant in various legal cases, frequently working with the United States Equal Employment Opportunity Commission, the National Fair Housing Alliance, and the United States Department of Justice, among other organizations.

== Education ==
Baugh began his undergraduate studies at Taft College before transferring to Temple University, where he completed his B.A. in Speech, Rhetoric, and Communication. He then earned both an M.A. and Ph.D. in Linguistics from the University of Pennsylvania, under the doctoral supervision of sociologist William Labov. In addition to Labov, Baugh studied extensively under anthropological linguist Dell Hymes and sociologist Erving Goffman.

== Professional career ==
Baugh's first academic appointment was as lecturer in Black Studies and Linguistics at Swarthmore College in 1975. In 1978, he was appointed assistant professor of Sociology and Anthropology, Black Studies, and Linguistics at Swarthmore. The following year, he began teaching at the University of Texas at Austin as an assistant professor of Linguistics and Foreign Language Education. He was promoted to associate professor with tenure in 1984.

In 1990, Baugh became a professor of Education and Linguistics at Stanford University, where he remained until 2005. During this time, Baugh served as director of the Stanford Teacher Education Program. He became professor emeritus at Stanford upon his departure in 2005.

Baugh joined the teaching faculty of Washington University in St. Louis in 2005 as the Margaret Bush Wilson Professor in Arts and Sciences. He served a term as director of African and African American Studies from 2005 to 2010, and held appointments in the departments of Anthropology, Education, English, Linguistics, Philosophy-Neuroscience-Psychology, Psychological and Brain Sciences, and Urban Studies.

In 2024, Baugh joined the faculty of Rice University as the Barbara Jordan Distinguished Professor of Linguistics.

== Research ==
=== African American language studies ===
Baugh's early research focused on the language and culture of African Americans, employing a combination of quantitative and qualitative sociolinguistic methods. Baugh conducted the first longitudinal linguistic study of African American adults, described in his first book, Black Street Speech: Its History, Structure, and Survival. Its title was chosen in consultation with those whom Baugh interviewed for the project; they often described their vernacular, or most informal manner of speech, as "street speech".

In 1999, while at Stanford University, Baugh wrote Out of the Mouths of Slaves: African American Language and Educational Malpractice. The book contains a combination of linguistic and educational research, including specific ideas about ways to increase literacy among African Americans, who often fall victim to various forms of educational malpractice.

In response to an educational and legal controversy that resulted from a 1996 resolution by the Oakland Unified School District in California that declared Ebonics to be the indigenous language of its 27,000 African American students, Baugh wrote Beyond Ebonics: Linguistic Pride and Racial Prejudice. Baugh debunked many of the misconceptions about the concept of Ebonics (a portmanteau of "ebony" and "phonics", for "black sounds", a term coined by social psychologist Robert Williams) as well as some of the educational policies that emerged in the wake of the controversy.

In 2022, Baugh was named to the advisory board of the Oxford Dictionary of African American English.

=== Sociolinguistics ===
Baugh and Joel Sherzer edited Language in Use: Readings in Sociolinguistics, a volume of sociolinguistic studies that includes a combination of qualitative and quantitative studies of language usage in diverse speech communities.

His next editorial collaboration in sociolinguistics was a festschrift in honor of his mentor William Labov that was produced under the editorial leadership of Gregory Guy of New York University. This work, Towards a Social Science of Language, was published in two volumes: Variation and Change in Language and Society and Social Interaction and Discourse Structures. The studies in both volumes pay tribute to Labov's influence on the field of sociolinguistics.

=== Linguistic profiling ===
Baugh's research on linguistic profiling began with his own experience seeking housing in the San Francisco Bay Area as an African American. Baugh noticed that landlords who had given him an appointment after he utilized Standard American English over the phone later denied him the opportunity to rent after meeting in person. Baugh conducted a series of experiments, initially described by Thomas Purnell, William Idsardi, and Baugh in the 1999 article "Perceptual and Phonetic Experiments on American English Dialect Identification", showing that discrimination can occur based on dialect and that listeners can identify ethnicity through short samples of speech alone.

Baugh's findings have been replicated by others, affirming that people who speak with a dialect or accent that is devalued where they live may fall prey to linguistic profiling — having goods or services denied to them, typically sight unseen, during telephone calls after inquiring about those otherwise available goods or services. With long-standing support, primarily from the Ford Foundation, Baugh has continued to study various forms of linguistic discrimination in housing, education, medicine, and the law. His work, initially concentrated in the United States, has expanded to other countries and regions, including Brazil, the Caribbean, France, South Africa, and the United Kingdom.

=== Forensic linguistics and legal relevance ===
Forensic linguistics is the application of linguistic knowledge, methods, and insights to legal contexts, especially those concerned with linguistic evidence and language use in the judicial process. The field can be traced to the Cullen Davis murder trial, in which Roger Shuy, a professor emeritus of linguistics at Georgetown University, served as an expert witness, using discourse analysis methods to evaluate the speech of suspects and the defendant. Since then, other linguists have engaged in forensic linguistic analyses. For instance, in the Unabomber case, Shuy and FBI Agent James Fitzgerald used the language in Ted Kaczynski's manifesto to discern his location and age.

Baugh's contributions to forensic linguistics have built upon his formulation of linguistic profiling, and his work has been used in legal cases involving hostile work environments, unequal access to housing, and murder. Baugh has served as a consultant and as an expert witness in both civil and criminal trials.

== Publications ==
=== Books ===
==== As author ====
- Black Street Speech: Its History, Structure, and Survival (1983). University of Texas Press. ISBN 9780292707450
- Language in Use: Reading in Sociolinguistics (1984). Prentice Hall College Div. ISBN 9780135229965
- Out of the Mouths of Slaves: African American Language and Educational Malpractice (1999). University of Texas Press. ISBN 9780292708730
- Beyond Ebonics: Linguistic Pride and Racial Prejudice (2000). Oxford University Press. ISBN 978-0195152890
- Linguistics in Pursuit of Justice (2018). Cambridge University Press. ISBN 978-1316607312

==== As editor ====
- (with Sherzer) Language in Use: Readings in Sociolinguistics (1984). Prentice Hall. ISBN 9780135229965
- (with Guy, Feagin, and Schiffrin) Towards a Social Science of Language: Papers in honor of William Labov. Volume 1: Variation and change in language and society (1996). John Benjamins Publishing Company. ISBN 9781556195815
- (with Guy, Feagin, and Schiffrin) Towards a Social Science of Language: Papers in honor of William Labov. Volume 2: Social interaction and discourse structures (1997). John Benjamins Publishing Company. ISBN 9781556195822
- (with Mufwene, Rickford, and Bailey) African-American English: Structure, history, and use (1998). Routledge. ISBN 9780415117333
- (with Alim) Talkin Black Talk: Language, Education, and Social Change (2006). Teachers College Press. ISBN 978-0807747469

=== Select articles and chapters ===
- "Racial Identification by Speech" (2000). American Speech. 75 (4):362–364. doi:10.1215/00031283-75-4-362
- "The Ebonics Controversy" (2001). In R. Mesthrie (ed.), The Encyclopedia of Sociolinguistics. Kluwer.
- "It Ain't About Race: Some Lingering (Linguistic) Consequences of the African Slave Trade and Their Relevance to Your Personal Historical Hardship Index" (2006). Du Bois Review. 3 (1):145–159. doi:10.1017/S1742058X06060103
- "Attitudes towards Variation and Ear-Witness Testimony: Linguistic Profiling and Voice Discrimination in the Quest for Fair Housing and Fair Lending" (2007). In R. Bayley and C. Lucas (eds.), Sociolinguistic Variation: Theory, Methods, and Applications. Cambridge University Press. 338–348. ISBN 9780521691819
- "At Last—Plantation English in America: Nonstandard Varieties and the Quest for Educational Equity" (2007). Research in the Teaching of English. 41 (4):465–472.
- "African American Vernacular English/Ebonics" (2012). In J. Banks (ed.), Encyclopedia of Diversity in Education. SAGE Publishing. 49–54. ISBN 9781412981521
- "SWB: (Speaking while Black): Linguistic profiling and discrimination based on speech as a surrogate for race against speakers of African American vernacular English" (2015). In S. Lanehart (ed.), The Oxford Handbook of African American Language. Oxford University Press. Chapter 41, 755–769. ISBN 9780199795390
- "Linguistic Profiling and Discrimination" (2016). In N. Flores and O. Garcia (eds.), The Oxford Handbook of Language and Society. Oxford University Press. 349–368. ISBN 9780190212896
- "Sociolinguistic Evaluations of Inequality" (2020). International Journal of the Sociology of Language. 263: 59–66. doi:10.1515/ijsl-2020-2083
- "Linguistic Profiling and Language-Based Discrimination" (2021). In M. Aronoff (ed.), Oxford Bibliographies in Linguistics. Oxford University Press. doi:10.1093/OBO/9780199772810-0267
