= Rickford (surname) =

Rickford is a surname. Notable people with the surname include:

- Greg Rickford (born 1967), Canadian politician in Ontario
- John R. Rickford (born 1949), Guyanese-American academic and author
- Russell J. Rickford (born c. 1975), American scholar and activist
- William Rickford (1768-1854), English politician
