= Alice Goffman =

American sociologist (born 1982)

- Born: 1982 (age 43–44)
- Awards: ASA Dissertation Award (2011)

Academic background
- Education: University of Pennsylvania (BA); Princeton University (PhD)
- Doctoral advisor: Mitchell Duneier
- Other advisors: Paul DiMaggio, Devah Pager, Cornel West, Viviana Zelizer

Academic work
- Institutions: Pomona College, University of Wisconsin–Madison
- Main interests: Urban sociology; ethnography; inequality
- Notable works: On the Run: Fugitive Life in an American City (2014)

Alice Goffman (born 1982) is an American sociologist, urban ethnographer, and author. She was assistant professor of sociology at the University of Wisconsin–Madison and visiting assistant professor of sociology at Pomona College. She is known for the controversy that resulted from the publication of her 2014 book On the Run: Fugitive Life in an American City.

== Early life and education ==
Born in 1982, both of Alice Goffman's parents, who were Canadian immigrants to the United States, were social scientists. Her father was the famed sociologist Erving Goffman, while her mother, Gillian Sankoff, is a sociolinguist. Erving Goffman died from stomach cancer in 1982, soon after Alice's birth. In 1993, her mother married the sociolinguist William Labov, who later legally adopted Alice.

Goffman attended The Baldwin School, a private school for girls in Bryn Mawr, Pennsylvania. She earned a BA at the University of Pennsylvania and a PhD at Princeton University, both in sociology. Her doctoral dissertation committee was chaired by Mitchell Duneier and included Paul DiMaggio, Devah Pager, Cornel West, and Viviana Zelizer.

While earning her PhD at Princeton, Goffman co-taught undergraduate courses with Mitch Duneier as a Lloyd Cotsen Graduate Teaching Fellow. In 2010, she was awarded a two-year fellowship at the University of Michigan as a Robert Wood Johnson Scholar.

== Career ==
Beginning in the fall of 2012, Goffman taught both undergraduate and graduate level courses as an assistant professor at the University of Wisconsin–Madison. At UW Madison, she established the Wisconsin Collective for Ethnographic Research with a colleague and served on several committees. She has served as a reviewer and board member for several different sociological publications.

In 2014, Goffman published On the Run: Fugitive Life in an American City, an ethnographic account of her fieldwork on the impact of policing on the lives of young black men in Northeast Philadelphia. Since the publication of On the Run, Goffman has delivered talks at dozens of colleges, universities, and conferences. In 2015, she gave a TED Talk titled "How we’re priming some kids for college—and others for prison." That same year, she was accepted to the one-year fellowship program at the Institute for Advanced Study at Princeton.

In April 2017, after she was offered a position as a visiting professor at Pomona College, an anonymously authored open letter was written calling for Goffman's appointment to be rescinded due to allegations of racism in her work and research methods. The offer was not rescinded.

In 2019, she was denied tenure at University of Wisconsin-Madison.

=== On the Run ===
On the Run: Fugitive Life in an American City, published by University of Chicago Press, began as a research project Goffman started as a second-year undergraduate at the University of Pennsylvania, when she immersed herself in a disadvantaged neighborhood of Philadelphia with African-American young men who were subject to a high level of surveillance and police activity. Goffman continued working on this project as a graduate student at Princeton, eventually turning it into her doctoral thesis and book. Issued in paperback in April 2015, the book uses the experience of Goffman's subjects to illustrate how police treat and mistreat young black men within the framework of the American criminal justice system, and how this reshapes the lives of families in America's poor, black neighborhoods.

In the book's introduction, Goffman highlights her central argument: "The sheer scope of policing and imprisonment in poor Black neighborhoods is transforming community life in ways that are deep and enduring, not only for the young men who are their targets but for their family members, partners, and neighbors."

==== Initial critical reception ====
Several sociologists, including Howard Becker, Elijah Anderson, and Carol Stack, reviewed the book favorably.

Cornel West wrote, "Alice Goffman's On the Run is the best treatment I know of the wretched underside of neo-liberal capitalist America. Despite the social misery and fragmented relations, she gives us a subtle analysis and poignant portrait of our fellow citizens who struggle to preserve their sanity and dignity."

On the Run was also favorably received outside academia. The New York Times named it one of "100 notable books of 2014." The New York Times Book Review also named it as its weekly "Editor's Choice" selection on July 6, 2014. In The New York Times, Alex Kotlowitz called it "a remarkable feat of reporting." Writing in The New York Review of Books, Christopher Jencks predicted that the work would become "an ethnographic classic."

The book continued to gain popularity after Goffman's TED Talk, which has over 2 million views and has been widely circulated online. The talk describes the consequences of incarceration and policing for marginalized young people, calling for an end to mass incarceration and highlighting the need for criminal justice reform. Goffman's argument that "tough on crime" policing has done more harm than good has resonated with many advocates for reform on social media.

Conservative law professor Amy Wax of the University of Pennsylvania Law School wrote, "[Goffman] puts her finger on the wrong button. The force field that deforms 6th Street is not society’s effort to eradicate crime, but crime itself."

On the left, Dwayne Betts in Slate criticized Goffman for ignoring the lives of quiet achievement most young men live in the neighborhood she studied in favor of an "unrelenting focus on criminality." Christina Sharpe in The New Inquiry criticized Goffman for failing to fully understand and acknowledge the power structures at work during her fieldwork, and criticized the book's favorable critical reception for elevating the work of a white scholar over important contributions by black scholars. In addition, some reviewers have accused Goffman, as a white upper-class woman, of writing "jungle book" tropes about poor, young African-American men.

==== Allegations of data fabrication and criminal conduct ====
Some parties have criticized On the Run for factual inaccuracy and Goffman's allegedly felonious conduct. Legal ethicist Steven Lubet, reviewing On the Run in The New Rambler, claimed that Goffman had admitted to committing conspiracy to commit murder and "involved her[self] as an accomplice in the evident commission of a major felony" in a passage describing the aftermath of the murder of one of her sources. After Goffman responded, Lubet said that she "essentially admits that she embellished and exaggerated her account of a crucial episode, which should leave even the most sympathetic readers doubting her word." Lubet revisited On the Run in his 2017 book Interrogating Ethnography: Why Evidence Matters.

Lubet also questioned Goffman's claim, which he called "outlandish", that she had personally witnessed police officers making arrests after running the names of visitors to hospitals. Yale law professor James Forman Jr. agreed with Lubet and wrote that he "had never heard of such a thing. When I spoke with civil-rights attorneys and public defenders in New York, Philadelphia, and Washington, D.C., and with a police official in New Haven, Connecticut, I couldn’t find a single person who knew of a case like Alex and Donna’s." Journalist Dan McQuade of Philadelphia magazine was similarly unable to verify Goffman's assertion. Lubet also questioned a claim that one of Goffman's sources, "Tim", had at age 11 been placed on three years of juvenile probation on the charge of "accessory" to receiving stolen property, after being arrested as a passenger in a stolen car.

Reporter Jesse Singal of New York magazine tracked down some of the anonymized subjects of the book and interviewed them. He concluded that "her book is, at the very least, mostly true", though he was unable to obtain precise details of the hospital arrest incident or the arrest of the juvenile "Tim". Singal wrote that "Lubet's skepticism seems well-founded" and concluded that "the most likely explanation for these discrepancies is that [Goffman] simply didn't heed her own advice about credulously echoing sources' stories; it might be that important details about how these events unfolded got lost along the way."

In his lengthy review of the book and the controversy, law professor Paul Campos at the University of Colorado Boulder said there were "numerous and significant incongruities, contradictions, inaccuracies, and improbable incidents scattered throughout" the text and that Goffman's book "reveals flaws in the way social science in general, and ethnography in particular, is produced." To take one example, he was highly skeptical of Goffman's description of an incident where a man was shot and killed in her presence. Campos asked whether "a friend of Chuck's [was] actually murdered before Goffman's eyes, forcing her to run away, with blood spattering her shoes and pants? Did she avoid being questioned by the police, who, one presumes, would have discovered both a body and Goffman's car when they arrived on the scene? How is it that having someone murdered right in front of her merits no more than one almost throwaway sentence in her book?"

The popularity of On the Run in the mainstream media has put the practice of ethnography under scrutiny. Journalist Gideon Lewis-Kraus published a longform defense of Goffman's book in The New York Times Magazine, in which he argued that most sociologists consider the alleged errors in On the Run the inevitable result of her university's Institutional Review Board requirement that informants be anonymized and field notes be destroyed.

An anonymous 57-page critique of On the Run circulated on academic LISTSERVs claiming that Goffman had fabricated many of the incidents she described. The University of Wisconsin-Madison reviewed the allegations and found them to be "without merit". Lewis-Kraus read a detailed refutation of the critique composed and shown to him by Goffman, although she has declined to share it with the public. He writes that she "persuasively explains many of the lingering issues" but that "the hardest elements of her story to confirm are the ones that feel like cinematic exaggerations, especially with respect to police practices; several officers challenged as outlandish her claim that she was personally interrogated with guns on the table." When asked for corroboration, Goffman disagreed with what she considered Lewis-Kraus's assumption that "[t]he way to validate the claims in the book is by getting officials who are white men in power to corroborate them.... The point of the book is for people who are written off and delegitimated to describe their own lives and to speak for themselves about the reality they face, and this is a reality that goes absolutely against the narratives of officials or middle-class people. So finding 'legitimate' people to validate the claims—it feels wrong to me on just about every level."

Goffman's publishers told The New York Times that they stood behind Goffman and her book. Goffman's thesis adviser at Princeton, Mitchell Duneier, defended the portion of Goffman's work which is in her thesis, telling The Chronicle of Higher Education that he met with and verified the identities of some of her informants.

In The Chronicle of Higher Education, sociologist Jack Katz also addressed the ethical dilemmas that accompany Goffman's brand of ethnography: "Most of the time, people doing research on drugs and crime and the police don't report the incidents that potentially compromise them. The ethical line she crossed, in a way, was honesty." Columbia University sociologist Shamus Khan said: "I don't think Alice made up any data. I think there are questions about reporting things she heard as if they were things she saw (which she is hardly unique in doing—most people do this, but they definitely should not)." Andrew Gelman wrote: "Goffman's success, and the reputation of her work, depend crucially on the trust of her audience. Once that trust is gone, I think it's very hard to get it back. I think she'll have to move into an arena in which she can document her work, or else move into some field such as advocacy in which documented truth is not required."

== Awards ==
- 2010 Jane Addams Award for Best Article, Community and Urban Section of the American Sociological Association, for "On The Run: Wanted Men in a Philadelphia Ghetto" published in the American Sociological Review.
- 2011 Dissertation Award, American Sociological Association, for "the best PhD dissertation for a calendar year."

== See also ==
- Chicago school (sociology)
- Urban anthropology
- Urban sociology
