= Sankoff =

Sankoff is a surname. Notable people with the surname include:

- David Sankoff (born 1942), mathematician, bioinformatician, computer scientist and linguist
- Gillian Sankoff, sociolinguist
- Irene Sankoff, musical theatre creator
