= IAFL =

IAFL may refer to:

- The Irish American Football League
- The International Association of Forensic Linguists
