= Jan Svartvik =

Swedish anglicist and linguist (1931–2024)

- Born: 18 August 1931; Fryksände, Torsby Municipality, Värmlands län, Sweden
- Died: 18 June 2024 (aged 92)
- Known for: Forensic linguistics
- Awards: August Prize (Literature, 1999)

Academic background
- Education: Uppsala University
- Thesis: On voice in the English verb (1966)

Academic work
- Institutions: Lund University
- Main interests: English language, Corpus linguistics

Jan Lars Svartvik (18 August 1931 – 18 June 2024) was a Swedish linguist and professor in English. Svartvik's work started an entirely new discipline, forensic linguistics. He was the author of several grammar books on English that were widely used in teaching English in Sweden during his lifetime. One of his research areas was also corpus linguistics.

== Early life ==
Jan Svartvik was born in Torsby, Sweden, 18 August 1931.

== Career ==
Svartvik spent four years at University College, London, starting in 1961. He earned his PhD in 1966 at Uppsala Universitet.

In 1968 Svartvik analysed the statements by Timothy John Evans given to police at Notting Hill police station, England, in the case of an alleged murder by Evans in 1949, who was found guilty and executed but later was found innocent. In "The Evans Statements: A Case for Forensic Linguistics" where Svartvik concluded Evans did not actually give the statements to the police officers as had been stated at the trial, the term forensic linguistics appeared for the first time.

In 1970 Svartvik became professor of English at Lund University, where he remained active until 1990.

The first edition of Engelsk Universitetsgrammatik (University Grammar of English) by Svartvik and Olof Sager was published in 1972. This work remained the standard for Swedish students of English in higher education for years.

Svartvik was a member of the Royal Swedish Academy of Sciences and of the Royal Physiographic Society in the city of Lund.

== Death ==
Jan Svartvik died on 18 June 2024, at the age of 92. His son Jesper Svartvik (born 1965), is a theologian.

== Bibliography ==
- Svartvik, Jan (1966). On Voice in the English Verb. Janua Linguarum. Series Practica (2011 Reprint ed.). Berlin: De Gruyter. ISBN 978-90-279-0669-4.
- Quirk, Randolph; Svartvik, Jan (1966). Investigating Linguistic Acceptability. Janua Linguarum. Series Minor (2019 Reprint ed.). Berlin Boston: De Gruyter Mouton. ISBN 978-3-11-082620-3.
- Svartvik, Jan (1968). The Evans Statements: A case for forensic linguistics (in Swedish). Elanders.
- Carvell, H.; Svartvik, Jan (1969). Computational Experiments in Grammatical Classification (2018 Reprint ed.). Berlin Boston: De Gruyter Mouton. ISBN 978-3-11-087989-6.
- Svartvik, Jan, ed. (1973). Errata: papers in error analysis. Lund: Gleerup. ISBN 978-91-40-03223-2.
- English Pocket Grammar (1974)
- Svartvik, Jan (1978). Engelsk universitetsgrammatik (in Swedish). Stockholm; Göteborg: Esselte studium. ISBN 978-91-24-27023-0.
- Svartvik, Jan; Quirk, Randolph, eds. (1980). A Corpus of English conversation. Lund studies in English. Lund: C.W.K. Gleerup. ISBN 978-91-40-04740-3.
- Svartvik, Jan, ed. (1982). Survey of spoken English: report on research, 1975-81. Lund studies in English. Lund, Sweden: C.W.K. Gleerup. ISBN 978-91-40-04822-6.
- Greenbaum, Sidney; Quirk, Randolph; Svartvik, Jan, eds. (1983). Studies in English linguistics: for Randolph Quirk. London: Longman. ISBN 978-0-582-55079-7.
- A Comprehensive Grammar of the English Language (with Randolph Quirk, Sidney Greenbaum, and Geoffrey Leech) (1985)
- Svartvik, Jan; Svartvik, Rikard (2000). Handbok i engelska (in Swedish). Stockholm: Norstedts Ordbok. ISBN 978-91-7227-263-7.
- Svartvik, Jan; Svartvik, Rikard (2004). Sagt och gjort: engelska idiom, ordspråk, talesätt, citat. Stockholm: Norstedts ordbok. ISBN 978-91-7227-383-2.
- Svartvik, Jan (2005). Engelska: öspråk, världsspråk, trendspråk (in Swedish) (Ny utg. ed.). Stockholm: Pan. ISBN 978-91-7263-687-3.
- Svartvik, Jan (2003). Engelska ord ombord: nautisk ordbok: svensk-engelsk/engelsk-svensk: nautical dictionary: Swedish-English/English-Swedish (Ny, omarb. och utök. utg. ed.). Stockholm: Nautiska förl. ISBN 978-91-89564-08-4.
- Svartvik, Jan; Sager, Olof (2010). Modern engelsk grammatik (in Swedish) (6. uppl ed.). Stockholm: Liber. ISBN 978-91-47-02088-1.
- Leech, Geoffrey N.; Svartvik, Jan (2013). A communicative grammar of English (Third ed.). Abingdon: Routledge, Taylor & Francis. ISBN 978-0-582-50633-6.
- Svartvik, Jan; Leech, Geoffrey N.; Crystal, David (2016). English: one tongue, many voices (Second ed.). London: Palgrave Macmillan. ISBN 978-1-137-55022-4.

== Awards ==
- August Prize in Literature (1999)

== See also ==
- A Comprehensive Grammar of the English Language
- Survey of English Usage
