= Forensic speechreading =

Forensic speechreading (or forensic lipreading) is the use of speechreading for information or evidential purposes. Forensic speechreading can be considered a branch of forensic linguistics. In contrast to speaker recognition, which is often the focus of voice analysis from an audio record, forensic speechreading usually aims to establish the content of speech, since the identity of the speaker is usually apparent. Often, it involves the production of a transcript of lip-read video-recordings of talk that lack a usable audiotrack, for example CCTV material. Occasionally, 'live' lipreading is involved, for example in the Casey Anthony case. Forensic speechreaders are usually deaf or from deaf families (CODA), and use speechreading in their daily lives to a greater extent than people with normal hearing outside the deaf community. Some speechreading tests suggest deaf people can be better lipreaders than most hearing people.

== Speechreading expertise ==
No tests of speechreading have yet been developed in a forensic context, that is, to benchmark individual skills in speechreading from a video record, including the production of a reliable transcript. For many years, UK agencies made extensive use of one particular speechreader, whose reports are now not to be used for evidential purposes. Several speechreaders and deaf professionals currently offer these services. Expert speechreaders may be able to advise on various issues, including whether a video record is or is not speechreadable, and the accent and language used by a talker. In the UK, teachers of lipreading to adults recommend that their students should not undertake such tasks. Commissioning agents need to be aware of issues inherent in the unreliability of speechreading, and be prepared to treat such advice with caution.

== The law ==
In the UK, a landmark case and appeal (R. v Luttrell et al., 2004) established the admissibility of lipreading evidence. However, the appeal court also required that the judge should issue a special warning as to its risks and limitations.

While lipread speech can carry useful speech information, it is inherently less accurate than (clearly) heard speech because many distinctive features of speech are produced by actions of the tongue within the oral cavity and are not visible. This is a limitation imposed by speech itself, not the expertise of the speechreader. It is the main reason why the accuracy of a speechreader working on a purely visual record cannot be considered wholly reliable, however skilled they may be and irrespective of hearing status. The type of evidence and the utility of such evidence varies from case to case.

In the US, there is debate concerning the admissibility of speechreading evidence and its status, especially in relation to variations in state and federal evidential procedures, and with respect to the privacy implications of the Fourth Amendment to the US constitution.

== Three UK cases involving speechreading evidence ==
- R v Luttrell. Nine defendants, including Luttrell, were found guilty on a charge of conspiracy to commit armed robbery and dispose of stolen goods. Before his arrest, Luttrell, who pleaded not guilty, was put under surveillance by the police, and a video record was obtained of a conversation. The expert lipreader, acting for the prosecution, produced a transcript of the conversation, indicating that he spoke the name of a co-conspirator. Although the defence claimed this was unreliable evidence, the judge ruled it admissible. On appeal, Luttrell's conviction was upheld, but the court of appeal made clear that juries should be warned of the unreliability of such evidence.
- Nat Fraser. The expert lipreader's transcript of a surveilled prison conversation between Nat Fraser and his friend, Glenn Lucas, was used by the prosecution to help secure a conviction for Fraser's murder of his wife, Arlene Fraser (Murder of Arlene Fraser). That verdict was overturned in part on the basis of unreliability of that lipreader's evidence. Following successful appeal against his original conviction, on re-trial in 2012 Fraser was again convicted of his wife's murder (Fraser v HM Advocate).
- R v John Terry. John Terry was alleged to have made a crude racist remark against Anton Ferdinand in the course of a televised Premier League football match between Chelsea FC and Queen's Park Rangers FC. Terry's remarks were seen in ten seconds of widely broadcast and re-broadcast close-up, and he was prosecuted under public order crime provisions, which include offences which are racially aggravated. Terry's defence argued that the remark was made in response to an earlier accusation from Ferdinand; Terry was just "sarcastically repeating a racist slur" he thought Anton Ferdinand had wrongly accused him of making, to refute the perceived allegation and to establish what had been said. In a joint report, two expert speecheaders corroborated the content of Terry's broadcast remarks, but could not infer why they were said, since there was no video record of the preceding context. The magistrate ruled that Terry could not be found guilty because of this uncertainty. The Football Association, whose Independent Regulatory Commission examined the case with a view to disciplinary action, came to a different conclusion. The Commission dismissed the lip readers' evidence, claiming "it is to be observed that the Chief Magistrate did not derive any real assistance from the evidence of the two lip readers who were called to give evidence", although the Chief Magistrate had himself spoken of the importance of the lip reading evidence: "Other words appear to be spoken. Both parties have agreed that expert evidence from lip readers is necessary to say what those words are. It is axiomatic that expert evidence is not called unless a particular expertise is needed to give an opinion to the court which the court cannot readily form itself." The Commission based its decision (which required a lower standard of proof) on a transcription of the video evidence that conflicted with the evidence of the lip readers. as well as on disputed circumstantial evidence and references to the disputed post-incident behaviour of Anton Ferdinand, John Terry, Ashley Cole and David Barnard.
