= Language analysis for the determination of origin =

Linguistic Instrument

Language analysis for the determination of origin (LADO) is an instrument used in asylum cases to determine the national or ethnic origin of the asylum seeker, through an evaluation of their language profile. To this end, an interview with the asylum seeker is recorded and analysed. The analysis consists of an examination of the dialectologically relevant features (e.g. accent, grammar, vocabulary and loanwords) in the speech of the asylum seeker. LADO is considered a type of speaker identification by forensic linguists. LADO analyses are usually made at the request of government immigration/asylum bureaux attempting to verify asylum claims, but may also be performed as part of the appeals process for claims which have been denied; they have frequently been the subject of appeals and litigation in several countries, e.g. Australia, the Netherlands and the UK.

== Background ==
A number of established linguistic approaches are considered to be valid methods of conducting LADO, including language variation and change, forensic phonetics, dialectology, and language assessment.

The underlying assumption leading to government immigration and asylum bureaux's use of LADO is that a link exists between a person's nationality and the way they speak. To linguists, this assumption is flawed: instead, research supports links between the family and community in which a person learns their native language, and enduring features of their way of speaking it. The notion that linguistic socialization into a speech community lies at the heart of LADO has been argued for by linguists since 2004, and is now accepted by a range of government agencies (e.g. Switzerland, Norway), academic researchers (e.g. Eades 2009, Fraser 2011, Maryns 2006, and Patrick 2013), as well as some commercial agencies, e.g. De Taalstudio, according to Verrips 2010).

== Use ==
Since the mid-1990s, language analysis has been used to help determine the geographical origin of asylum seekers by the governments of a growing number of countries (Reath, 2004), now including Australia, Austria, Belgium, Canada, Finland, Germany, the Netherlands, New Zealand, Norway, Sweden, Switzerland and the United Kingdom.

Pilots have been conducted by the UK, Ireland, and Norway. The UK legitimised the process in 2003; it has subsequently been criticised by immigration lawyers (see response by the Immigration Law Practitioners' Association), and also Craig 2012); and social scientists (e.g. Campbell 2013), as well as linguists (e.g. Patrick 2011).

In the Netherlands LADO is commissioned by the Dutch Immigration Service (IND). Language analysis is used by the IND in cases where asylum seekers cannot produce valid identification documents, and, in addition, the IND sees reason to doubt the claimed origin of the asylum seeker. The IND has a specialised unit (Bureau Land en Taal, or BLT; in English, the Office for Country Information and Language Analysis, or OCILA) that carries out these analyses. Challenges to BLT analyses are provided by De Taalstudio, a private company that provides language analysis and contra-expertise in LADO cases. Claims and criticisms regarding the Dutch LADO processes are discussed by Cambier-Langeveld (2010), the senior linguist for BLT/OCILA, and by Verrips 2010, the founder of De Taalstudio. Zwaan (2008, 2010) reviews the legal situation.

LADO reports are provided to governments in a number of ways: by their own regularly-employed linguists and/or freelance analysts; by independent academic experts; by commercial firms; or by a mixture of the above. In Switzerland language analysis is carried out by LINGUA, a specialized unit of the Federal Office for Migration, which both employs linguists and retains independent experts from around the world. The German and Austrian bureaux commission reports primarily from experts within their own countries. The UK and a number of other countries have commercial contracts with providers such as the Swedish firms Sprakab and Verified both of which have carried out language analyses for UK Visas and Immigration (formerly UK Border Agency) and for the Dutch Immigration Service, as well as other countries around the world.

== Language analysts ==
It is widely agreed that language analysis should be done by language experts. Two basic types of practitioners commonly involved in LADO can be distinguished: trained native speakers of the language under analysis, and professional linguists specialized in the language under analysis. Usually native speaker analysts are free-lance employees who are said to be under the supervision of a qualified linguist. When such analysts lack academic training in linguistics, it has been questioned whether they should be accorded the status of 'experts' by asylum tribunals, e.g. by Patrick (2012), who refers to them instead as "non-expert native speakers (NENSs)". Eades et al. (2003) note that "people who have studied linguistics to professional levels [...] have particular knowledge which is not available to either ordinary speakers or specialists in other disciplines". Likewise Dikker and Verrips (2004) conclude that native speakers who lack training in linguistics are not able to formulate reliable conclusions regarding the origin of other speakers of their language. The nature of the training which commercial firms and government bureaux provide to their analysts has been questioned in academic and legal arenas, but few specifics have been provided to date; see however accounts by the Swiss agency Lingua and Cambier-Langeveld of BLT/OCILA, as well as responses to the latter by Fraser and Verrips.

Claims for and against the use of such native-speaker analysts, and their ability to conduct LADO satisfactorily vis-à-vis the ability of academically trained linguists, have only recently begun to be the subject of research (e.g. Wilson 2009), and no consensus yet exists among linguists. While much linguistic research exists on the ability of people, including trained linguists and phoneticians and untrained native speakers, to correctly perceive, identify or label recorded speech that is played to them, almost none of the research has yet been framed in such a way that it can give clear answers to questions about the LADO context.

== Litigation ==
The matter of native-speaker analysts and many other issues are subjects of ongoing litigation in asylum tribunals and appeals courts in several countries. Vedsted Hansen (2010) describes the Danish situation, Noll (2010) comments on Sweden, and Zwaan (2010) reviews the Dutch situation.

In the UK, a 2010 Upper Tribunal (asylum) case known as 'RB', supported by a 2012 Court of Appeal decision, argue for giving considerable weight to LADO reports carried out by the methodology of native-speaker analyst plus supervising linguist. In contrast, a 2013 Scottish Court of Sessions decision known as M.Ab.N+K.A.S.Y. found that all such reports must be weighed against the standard Practice Directions for expert reports. Lawyers in the latter case have argued that "What matters is the lack of qualification", and since the Scottish court has equal standing to the England and Wales Appeals Court, the UK Supreme Court was petitioned to address the issues. On 5–6 March 2014, the UK Supreme Court heard an appeal brought by the Home Office concerning the nature of expert linguistic evidence provided to the Home Office in asylum cases, whether expert witness should be granted anonymity, the weight that should be given to reports by the Swedish firm Sprakab, and related matters.

== Criticism ==
Some methods of language analysis in asylum procedures have been heavily criticized by many linguists (e.g., Eades et al. 2003; Arends, 2003). Proponents of the use of native-speaker analysts agree that "[earlier] LADO reports were not very satisfactory from a linguistic point of view... [while even] today's reports are still not likely to satisfy the average academic linguist". Following an item on the Dutch public radio programme Argos, member of parliament De Wit of the Socialist Party presented a number of questions to the State Secretary of the Ministry of Justice regarding the reliability of LADO. The questions and the responses by the State Secretary can be found here.

== See also ==
- Shibboleth
- Linguistic profiling
