= We Are an African People =

2016 book by Russell Rickford

- First edition
- Author: Russell J. Rickford
- Subject: History of education in the United States
- Publisher: Oxford University Press
- Publication date: 2016
- Pages: 400
- ISBN: 9780199861477

We Are an African People: Independent Education, Black Power, and the Radical Imagination is a 2016 intellectual history of subaltern education in the United States, written by Russell J. Rickford and published by Oxford University Press.

== Sources ==
- Jones, Brian (2019). "Book/Media Review". The Journal of Negro Education. 88 (4): 511–513. doi:10.7709/jnegroeducation.88.4.0511. ISSN 0022-2984. JSTOR 10.7709/jnegroeducation.88.4.0511. S2CID 243649204.
- McCray, Kenja (July 2, 2016). "Rev. of We Are an African People: independent education, Black Power, and the radical imagination". The Sixties. 9 (2): 276–278. doi:10.1080/17541328.2016.1260294. ISSN 1754-1328. S2CID 151685288.
- Payne, Charles (February 2018). "Rev. of We Are an African People: Independent Education, Black Power, and the Radical Imagination". History of Education Quarterly. 58 (1): 162–165. doi:10.1017/heq.2017.55. ISSN 0018-2680. S2CID 149150481.
- Umoja, Akinyele (September 2017). "We Are an African People: Independent Education, Black Power, and the Radical Imagination". Journal of American History. 104 (2): 548–549. doi:10.1093/jahist/jax276. ISSN 0021-8723.
- https://www.aaihs.org/tag/weareanafricanpeople/
  - https://www.aaihs.org/prefiguring-the-african-american-postcolony/
  - https://www.aaihs.org/we-are-an-african-people-and-the-dynamism-of-black-power-studies/
  - https://www.aaihs.org/african-men-and-women-patriarchy-and-pan-africanism/
  - https://www.aaihs.org/we-are-equal-african-peoples/
  - https://www.aaihs.org/pragmatic-black-nationalism/
  - https://www.aaihs.org/the-pragmatic-utopia-an-authors-response/
