= Gregory Guy =

American linguist

Gregory R. Guy
- Born: August 23, 1950 (age 76); Washington, D.C.
- Education: Central High School (B.A.); Boston University (B.A.); University of Pennsylvania (M.A., Ph.D.)
- Occupations: Linguist; professor
- Website: gregoryrguy.com

Gregory Riordan Guy (born August 23, 1950) is a linguist who specializes in the study of language variation and language diversity, including sociolinguistics, historical linguistics, phonetics, and phonology. He has a particular interest in the Brazilian Portuguese and Spanish languages.

He received his first of two B.A. degrees from Central High School in Philadelphia, Pennsylvania (the only high school in the United States accredited to award such degrees to high school students), and went on to receive his B.A. from Boston University in 1972 and M.A. and Ph.D. in Linguistics from the University of Pennsylvania in 1975 and 1981. His Ph.D. dissertation described syntactic change in spoken Brazilian Portuguese.

Guy is now a Professor of Linguistics at New York University and has taught at Sydney, Temple, Cornell, Stanford, and York University in Toronto, Canada, and at Institutes of the Linguistic Society of America (1993, 1997, 2003, 2007) and the Associação Brasileira de Lingüística (1999, 2005). In sociolinguistics he has focused on language variation, language contact, quantitative methods, and the connection between social diversity and language change. He has conducted research on Brazilian Portuguese, Australian and American English, and Dominican and Argentine Spanish. Recent research projects include an investigation of ‘sociolinguistic universals’ with funding from the Social Science and Humanities Research Council of Canada.

Notable publications include Towards a Social Science of Language and a series of papers in the journal Language Variation and Change dealing with linguistic variation and phonological theory.

== Published works ==
- (with Crawford Feagin, Deborah Schiffrin, and John Baugh) Towards a Social Science of Language: Papers in honor of William Labov. Volume 1: Variation and change in language and society (1996). John Benjamins Publishing Company. ISBN 9781556195815
- (with Feagin, Schiffrin, and Baugh) Towards a Social Science of Language: Papers in honor of William Labov. Volume 2: Social interaction and discourse structures (1997). John Benjamins Publishing Company. ISBN 9781556195822
