= Steven Lubet =

- Born: United States

Academic work
- Institutions: Northwestern University

Steven Lubet is a legal scholar and author. Lubet is the Edna B. and Ednyfed H. Williams Memorial Professor of Law at Northwestern University.

Lubet has been noted for his commentary on controversial issues such as the appointment of scholar Steven Salaita at the University of Illinois, the controversy over the legal status of Alice Goffman's research methods in her widely acclaimed book, On the Run: Fugitive Life in an American City and support of Supreme Court Justice Neil Gorsuch's speaking at a President Donald Trump's hotel while cases about the Administration's travel ban and "challenging the constitutionality of payments to Mr. Trump’s companies" face the Supreme Court and lower courts.

Lubet is a former juvenile and criminal defense lawyer, and former legal services lawyer.

== Books by Lubet ==
- Nothing But the Truth: Why Trial Lawyers Don't, Can't, and Shouldn't Have to Tell the Whole Truth (New York University Press, 2001).
- Murder in Tombstone: The Forgotten Trial of Wyatt Earp (Yale University Press, 2004).
- Lawyers' Poker: 52 Lessons That Lawyers Can Learn From Card Players (Oxford University Press, 2006).
- Fugitive Justice: Runaways, Rescuers, and Slavery on Trial (Belknap Press of Harvard University Press, 2010).
- Modern Trial Advocacy: Analysis and Practice (NITA, 2010).
- John Brown’s Spy: The Adventurous Life and Tragic Confession of John E. Cook (Yale University Press, 2012).
- The "Colored Hero" of Harper's Ferry: John Anthony Copeland and the War Against Slavery (Cambridge University Press, 2015).
- Interrogating Ethnography: Why Evidence Matters (Oxford University Press, 2017.)
- The Trials of Rasmea Odeh: How a Palestinian Guerrilla Gained and Lost U.S. Citizenship (George Mason University Press, 2021).
