= Interrogating Ethnography =

Book on Discipline of Ethnography

Interrogating Ethnography: Why Evidence Matters
- Author: Steven Lubet
- Language: English
- Published: 2017
- Publisher: Oxford University Press
- ISBN: 978-0-19-065567-9 (Hardcover)

Interrogating Ethnography: Why Evidence Matters is a 2017 book by Steven Lubet of Northwestern University Law School, critiquing methods used in the discipline of ethnography. Writing in Contexts, Syid Ali of Long Island University called it "an essential critique of the most public-facing product sociology has to offer."

Interrogating Ethnography, which criticizes ethnographers for the practice of changing the name of the area they study, is part of the Replication crisis. But it is largely a critique of ethnography methodology when it relies on the narratives of interviewees with no attempt to verify assertions of fact.

Lubet began the project of writing this book after reading and publishing a notable critique of the use of evidence Alice Goffman's controversial 2014 book On the Run: Fugitive Life in an American City, That critique led him to read and attempt to verify "more than 50 ethnographic monographs and an equivalent number of articles. Focusing on sociologists’ studies of American cities... (and checking) facts that could be documented — or not... by consulting experts and pulling public records."

According to the Chronicle of Higher Education, the book "has touched off a debate about what ethnographers might learn from legal scholars, and vice versa.

The book's reception by ethnographers has been mixed.
