= Murder of Jenny Nicholl =

Murder of English woman

Jenny Nicholl
- Born: 6 October 1985; County Antrim, Northern Ireland
- Disappeared: 30 June 2005 (aged 19); Holly Hill Inn pub, Richmond, N. Yorks
- Died: 30 June 2005 (aged 19)
- Height: 5 ft 3 in (1.60 m)
- Parent(s): Ann and Brian Nicholl

Locations
1 Holly Hill Inn pub, Richmond, N. Yorks where Nicholls car was found parked abandoned.

Jenny Nicholl was a teenage girl who disappeared sometime on or after 30 June 2005 from the Richmond area of North Yorkshire, England. In February 2008, David Hodgson was convicted of her murder despite the lack of a body, crime scene or body deposition site. Hodgson was jailed for life, with a recommendation that he serve at least 18 years, after being convicted on DNA and fake text messaging evidence which involved his travelling many miles so as to make it appear that Nicholl was still alive and camping some distance away from her home town.

== Disappearance ==
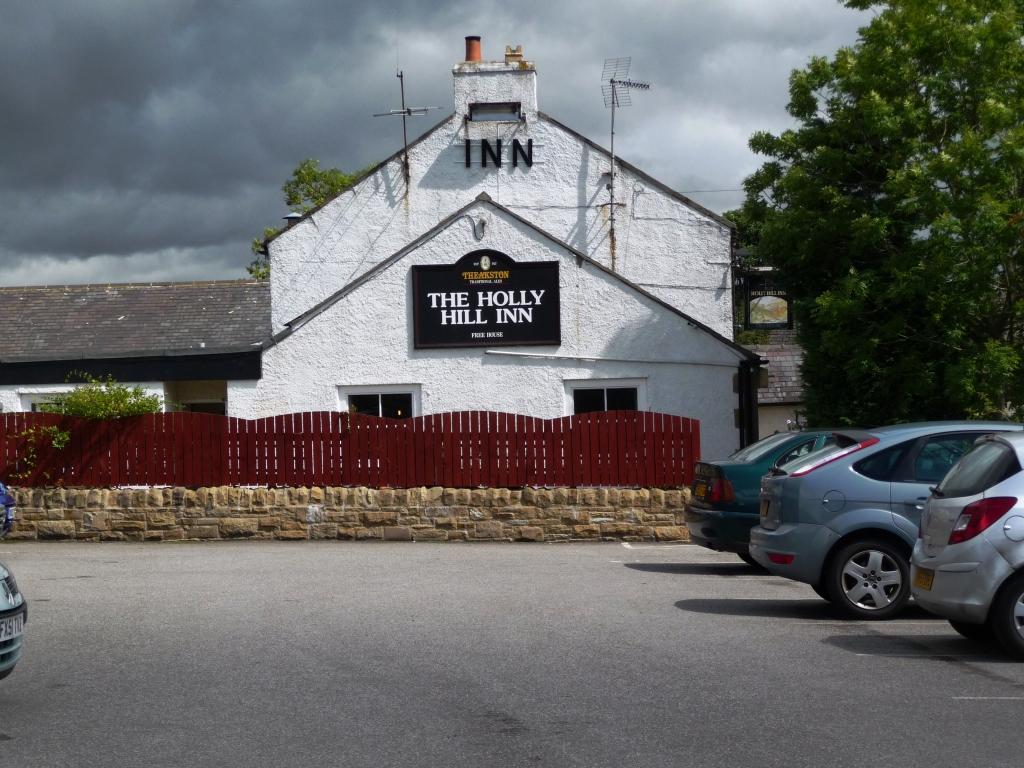
The Holly Hill Inn pub car park, Richmond where Nicholls car was found parked abandoned.

The Nicholl family lived in Richmond, North Yorkshire, where Nicholl worked at the local supermarket and played guitar in pub bands. Nicholl's father was in the British Army and the family settled in Richmond when the eldest son also joined the army and was posted to Catterick. On the 30 June 2005, Nicholl told her parents that she was spending the night with friends, which was not uncommon for her, and took items with her that suggested she was going on a camping trip. She left the house at 6:00 pm and that was the last confirmed sighting of Nicholl. Nicholl was reported missing by her parents on 4 July 2005 after they had no contact with her over the previous days and her car (a white Rover 214i) was found parked in the Holly Hill Pub in Richmond.

Nine days later, North Yorkshire Police interviewed David Hodgson, who was 45 at the time of Nicholl's disappearance, was a married father of two, and who had been grooming Nicholl since she was 14 years old, though he maintained that the abuse was not sexual until she was 16 and that they had had sex only five times. Hodgson's two daughters had both attended the same school as Nicholl (St Francis Xavier School in Richmond). Around the time of the abuse starting, it was said that there was some name-calling of Nicholl and eventually an assault in which the police were finally involved.

During his first police interview, Hodgson denied abusing Nicholl and also denied anything to do with her disappearance. The next day, Nicholl's mobile phone was switched on and messages were sent which led her family and the police to believe she was alive and well. The text messages were later revealed to have been sent from locations as far afield as Carlisle in Cumbria and Jedburgh in the Scottish Borders. Later, the authenticity of these messages were put into doubt by the police when they stated in November 2005 that the inquiry had turned from a disappearance into a murder investigation. At the end of July 2005, police found David Hodgson in a hut near to Hudswell. He had taken an overdose of pills and wine. In later police interviews, Hodgson claimed that he and Nicholl were lovers, but that their affair had ended 12 months earlier.

Whilst there was some initial hope with the mobile phone messages (Ann Nicholl went to both locations to search for her daughter), police still maintained an active search for Nicholl which lasted the rest of the summer of 2005 and involved searching over 150 areas, septic tanks at farms and also utilised soldiers from Catterick Garrison to help out.

During the investigation it was revealed that Nicholl had also started seeing Hodgson's elder brother, Robert, in the weeks prior to her disappearance. Robert Hodgson claimed he was unaware of Nicholl's being linked with his younger brother, despite the two brothers' erecting the huts in Sandbeck Plantation that critical evidence was found at during and after the police searches. In December 2005, Ann Nicholl appeared on the BBC programme Crimewatch to appeal for help in finding her daughter and the conviction of her killer.

In May 2007, police formally charged David Hodgson, and he appeared that same month in Northallerton Magistrates Court where he was remanded in custody until a trial early in 2008.

== Conviction ==
The case came to court in January 2008 where Hodgson denied taking Nicholl to any of his ramshackle huts hidden in the Sandbeck Plantation near to the A6136 road, south of Richmond. DNA evidence contradicted this as did the discovery of Nicholl's nightdress, teddy bear and cassette player at the same location. Police believed that Hodgson became jealous of his brother's relationship with Nicholl and he killed her on the night she disappeared. Hodgson's elder daughter stated in court that Nicholl was seen alive in Richmond two days after her disappearance and had been staying with Robert. Robert Hodgson denied this claim and stated in court he had not seen Nicholl for some time.

At court, the prosecution were able to establish that the text messages sent to family and friends days after her disappearance were not in the style that Nicholl would typically compose. The prosecution also submitted evidence that Hodgson had hired a car on 9 and 14 July 2005 and the distances travelled on those days fit the distances both there and back from Richmond to Carlisle and Richmond to Jedburgh. The dates also married up with the dates that the messages were sent from Nicholl's phone. The prosecution also said that David Hodgson was an intensely jealous man who was angry about Nicholl's new relationship with his brother, Robert.

In February 2008, David Hodgson was found guilty of Nicholl's murder at Teesside Crown Court.

== Aftermath ==
In September 2008, the Council for the Registration of Forensic Practitioners recognised Forensic Linguistics as a speciality. The UK government body, which strives to promote excellence in forensic practice, recognised that evidence given in cases like those against Hodgson and Stuart Campbell (the murderer of Danielle Jones, whose body, like Nicholl's, has never been found) had a significant impact on each case.

In November 2009, a coroner ruled that Nicholl was dead and that her death was judged to be an unlawful killing.

== See also ==
- List of murder convictions without a body
- List of solved missing person cases (post-2000)
