= Russell J. Rickford =

American scholar and author

- Born: Guyana

Academic background
- Education: Howard University; Columbia University

Academic work
- Discipline: history
- Institutions: Cornell University
- Main interests: black radical tradition; black liberal culture after World War II
- Notable works: Betty Shabazz: A Remarkable Story of Survival and Faith Before and After Malcolm X; We Are an African People
- Website: https://history.cornell.edu/russell-rickford

Russell John Rickford (born c. 1975) is an American scholar and activist who is an associate professor in the History Department at Cornell University. He has written the only in-depth biography on Betty Shabazz, the wife of Malcolm X.

Rickford's research focuses on the black radical tradition and on black liberal culture after World War II. He lectures on American social and political history, among other subjects.

== Early life and education ==
Born in Guyana, Rickford grew up in Palo Alto, California. His mother, Angela E. Rickford, is a professor of Special Education at San Jose State University and the author of I Can Fly: Teaching Narratives and Reading Comprehension to African Americans and other Ethnic Minority Students. His father, John R. Rickford, an authority on African-American Vernacular English and the author of numerous books and scholarly articles, teaches linguistics at Stanford University.

Rickford attended Gunn High School in Palo Alto and won a National Merit Scholarship.

He went on to study journalism at Howard University in Washington, D.C., where he also served as Alpha Phi Alpha president for two years and wrote for The Hilltop. Rickford earned his bachelor's degree magna cum laude in 1997.

== Career ==
Rickford began his career as a reporter for The Philadelphia Inquirer and went on to work for a public-relations firm in Philadelphia.

=== Early works ===
In 1998, he began doing research for his biography on Betty Shabazz. In 2000, Rickford and his father co-wrote Spoken Soul: The Story of Black English, a book about African-American Vernacular English which won the American Book Award. The term "Spoken Soul" was coined by author Claude Brown in the 1960s and pays homage to the rhythmic, poetic qualities of African-American English.

In 2001, Rickford left his job in Philadelphia and moved into his parents' garage to write the first, and to date only, in-depth biography of Betty Shabazz. An effort that spanned five and a half years, Betty Shabazz: A Remarkable Story of Survival and Faith Before and After Malcolm X was published in 2003. Writing in The Crisis, William Jelani Cobb called Rickford's work "a thorough, insightful and engaging book, befitting its enigmatic—and ultimately heroic—subject".

=== Academia ===
In 2002, Rickford enrolled at Columbia University, studying for a master's degree in African-American studies under Manning Marable. Between 2003 and 2004, he contributed research to Marable's Malcolm X Project and, according to Marable, "was instrumental in setting up many oral histories and interviews" with Malcolm X's contemporaries. Marable credited Rickford with coining the term "Malcolmology" to describe the way in which African Americans rediscovered Malcolm X as a cultural icon after he was embraced by major hip-hop artists of the 1980s and 1990s. Rickford completed his doctorate in history at Columbia in 2009. His dissertation won that year's Bancroft Dissertation Award. His research concerns African-American politics after the Civil Rights Movement. In an interview, he said he was trying to answer the question, "Why did black nationalism become increasingly conservative towards the end of the 20th century?"

Rickford joined the Dartmouth faculty in 2009, moving to Cornell in 2014. In early 2011, he edited a collection of writings by Marable entitled Beyond Boundaries. Described by his former mentor as "one of the most talented and insightful" members of a new generation of black intellectuals, In 2016, Rickford completed a history of Pan-Africanist private schools during the Black Power era titled We Are an African People: Independent Education, Black Power, and the Radical Imagination.

== Controversy ==
In October 2023, a video was publicized of Rickford speaking at an October 15 rally in support of Palestinians after the 2023 Hamas attack on Israel, where according to The Telegraph, he referred to the massacre of more than 1,400 Israelis on Oct 7 by the terrorist group as a "challenge to the monopoly of violence." He also said "It was exhilarating". Cornell officials condemned his remarks.

On October 18, The Cornell Daily Sun published a letter of apology for his "horrible choice of words," noting that "some of the language I used was reprehensible." By October 20, U.S. Senator Kirsten Gillibrand and U.S. Representative Claudia Tenney had called for Rickford to be fired. Rickford took a leave of absence, resuming teaching the following year.

== Personal life ==
Rickford was introduced to his wife by Manning Marable when they were both working as research assistants for Marable's Malcolm X Project.

== Works ==
- Rickford, John R.; Rickford, Russell J. (2000). Spoken Soul: The Story of Black English. New York: John Wiley & Sons. ISBN 978-0-471-32356-3.
- Rickford, Russell J. (2003). Betty Shabazz: A Remarkable Story of Survival and Faith Before and After Malcolm X. Naperville, Ill.: Sourcebooks. ISBN 978-1-4022-0171-4.
- Rickford, Russell J., ed. (2011). Beyond Boundaries: The Manning Marable Reader. Herndon, Va.: Paradigm. ISBN 978-1-59451-861-4.
- Rickford, Russell J. (2016). We Are an African People: Independent Education, Black Power, and the Radical Imagination. New York: Oxford University Press. ISBN 978-0-19-986147-7.
