= Deborah Schiffrin =

American linguist (1951–2017)

Deborah Sue Schiffrin (May 30, 1951 – July 20, 2017) was an American linguist who researched areas of discourse analysis and sociolinguistics, producing seminal work on the topic of English discourse markers.

Throughout her career, Schiffrin wrote four books, edited five books, published over 51 articles and book chapter. She served on the faculty at Georgetown University from 1982 to 2013 teaching sociolinguistics, discourse analysis, and pragmatics, serving as chair of the department from 2003 to 2009. As department chair, Schiffrin designed the department's Masters in Language and Communication program.

Schiffrin served on the editorial board of academic journals including Language in Society, Journal of Pragmatics, Language and Communication, Discourse Processes, Pragmatics, Discourse Studies, and Storyworlds, as well as the John Benjamins Publishing Company's academic book series Pragmatics and Beyond New Series.

== Early life and education ==
Born and raised in Philadelphia, she earned a B.A. in sociology from Temple University (1972), an MA in sociology also from Temple University (1975), and her PhD in linguistics from the University of Pennsylvania (1982) under the supervision of William Labov. Schiffrin taught at Georgetown University in Washington, D.C., and at the University of California, Berkeley.

== Discourse markers ==
From personal words spoken with Alexandra Johnston, Schiffrin stated that the three main influential people of her academic career were, Noam Chomsky, William Labov, and Erving Goffman. Thus, her areas of interest included sociolinguistics, pragmatics, discourse analysis, language interaction, narrative analysis, grammar in interaction, language and identity, and discourse and history. Her expertise however lay within discourse markers.

She looked at several different characteristics of discourse markers including: syntactic position, grammatical, stress, phonological reduction, and tone. She conducted her analysis by interviewing primarily Jewish Americans in Philadelphia about their lives. Her interview methods consisted of oral narratives produced by the participants, (for more detail on Shiffrin's work with narrative analysis see the following section below).

== Narrative analysis and discourse analysis ==
Schiffrin contributed to the understanding of both narrative analysis and discourse analysis by analyzing oral narratives produced by various Jewish Americans living in the Philadelphia area. These oral narratives consisted of naturally occurring stories in everyday interactions, life stories, and oral histories. She analyzed these different types of oral narratives for features of argument, sociolinguistic construction of identity, the retelling (how a single story is retold for different situations and/or purposes), how grammar serves communication, and change over time (how the story is retold over time and/if features of the story are changed).

In the 1990s Schiffrin and a team received a grant from the National Science Foundation to investigate the different ways that people indicate what they are communicating, in which Schiffrin served as lead investigator. From this investigative work Schiffrin developed and published her book Approaches to Discourse in 1994.

=== Approaches to Discourse (1994) ===
Approaches to Discourse (1994) exemplifies how discourse analysis uses methods from other disciplines, besides just linguistics, including anthropology, sociology, and philosophy. The book compares and contrasts several different approaches of linguistic analysis in relation to discourse including: speech theory, pragmatics, conversation analysis, ethnography, interactional sociolinguistics, and variation analysis. Within each approach described, Schiffrin includes her own analysis of the narratives used above in order to illustrate the similarities and differences of the various approaches.

== Death ==
Dr. Schiffrin died on July 20, 2017, aged 66. At the time of her death, she was living in Washington, D.C., with her husband and two children. She was survived by her husband, Dr. Louis Scavo, and their children, David and Laura Scavo, of Bethesda, Maryland.

== Speeches and addresses ==
- 1981 Some relationships between discourse order and coherence. University of Pennsylvania, Cognitive Science Colloquium.
- 1982 Some semantic and pragmatic functions of discourse markers. Washington Linguistics Society, Washington D.C.
- 1984 Pragmatic coordinators of talk. University of Pennsylvania, Linguistics Colloquium.
- 1985 The empirical basis of discourse pragmatics. Ferguson-Greenberg Lecture Series in Sociolingusitcs and Language Universals. Stanford University.
- 1985 Framing truth and sincerity in argument. Panel on "Frame Analysis" (organized by Bambi Schieffelin) American Anthropological Association Meetings, Washington D.C.
- 1985 The work of our words: From meaning to action. "Vital Signs" Series in Semiotics. Johns Medical Institutions.
- 1987 Sociolinguistic approaches to discourse: Toward a synthesis and expansion. Keynote Address at New Ways of Analyzing Variation XVI.
- 1990 The proximal/distal temporal axis. Northwestern University, Linguistics Colloquium.
- 1990 Variation in anaphoric then. Stanford University, Linguistics Colloquium. University of California, Davis, Linguistics Colloquium.
- 1991 Approaches to topic in discourse. Keynote speaker at 26th Annual Mid-America Linguistics Conference, Oklahoma.
- 1991 Clause order and discourse structure. University of Delaware, Linguistics.
- 1992/1991 Everyday descriptions: The structure of lists in discourse. University of California, Berkeley, Cognitive Science Colloquium.
- 1992 Sociolinguistic studies of narrative. A Quarter century retrospective in honor of William Labov's Social Stratification of English in New York City' Annual Meeting of American Dialect Society Tribute to William Labov, Philadelphia PA.
- 1992 Deixis and topic in discourse. University of California, Berkeley, Linguistics Colloquium.
- 1993 The transformation of experience and identity in narrative. University of Colorado, Boulder, Linguistics Colloquium.
- 1993 Genre and topic. Stanford University, Linguistics Colloquium.
- 1995 Narrative as self-portrait. Georgetown University Linguistics Society I, Washington D.C.
- 1996 The interactive construction of space discourse. Discourse, language and conceptual structure II, SUNY Buffalo.
- 1996 Participation frameworks in argument. Georgetown Linguistics Society II.
- 1997 Locating 'there' in language, text, and interaction. University of Southern California Linguistics colloquium. Keynote address NWAVE XXVI, Quebec City, Canada.
- 1998 Identity in a Holocaust survivor's life story Panel on "language and Identity," AAAL, Seattle Washington.
- 1999 Narrative and memory in Holocaust discourse. Conference on Narrative and Memory, Georgetown University.
- 2000 The past and future of discourse analysis. "Plenoquium," at NWAVE XXVIII, East Lansing, Michigan.
- 2000 A Linguistic approach to oral histories. Fellows' Seminar, United States Holocaust Memorial Museum.
- 2001 Language and history: The Narrative connection. Georgetown University Roundtable on Language and Linguistics.
- 2003 Redoing Structure to retell a story. Panel on Discourse and Grammar (organized by Deborah Tannan), Georgetown University Round Table on Languages and Linguistics.
- 2003 Changing participation frameworks in a retold narrative. Panel on Positioning (Organized by Michael Bamberg) at American Association of Applied Linguistics, Annual Conference, Washington D.C.
- 2004 Life, language and the pursuit of narrative. LISO, University of California, Santa Barbara.
- 2005 Saying it again. Goldtrap. Talk in Humanities, Iowa State University.
- 2007 The "local" and "global" in Holocaust oral histories. Georgetown Linguistic Society: Language and Globalization Panel on Transnational Discourse. Georgetown University.
- 2007 Old Languages in New Stories, Transcending Boundaries: Jewish Languages, Identities and Cultures, Georgetown University; Society for the Study of Narrative, International Meeting, Washington D.C.

== Publications (selected) ==
- Schiffrin, Deborah. 1974. Handwork as ceremony: The case of the handshake. Semiotica, 12(3). 189–202 (Reprinted in A. Kendon (Ed.). (1981). Nonverbal Communication, interaction, and gesture. The Hague, Netherlands: Mouton.
- Schiffrin, Deborah. 1977. Opening Encounters. American Sociological Review. 42(4), 671–691
- Schiffrin, Deborah. 1980. Meta-talk: Organizational and evaluative brackets in discourse. Sociological Inquiry 50(3–4), pp. 199–236.
- Schiffrin, Deborah. 1981. Tense variation in narrative. Language, pp. 45–62.
- Schiffrin, Deborah. 1984. Jewish argument as sociability. Language in society 13(3), pp. 311–335.
- Schiffrin, Deborah. 1985a. Conversational coherence: the role of well. Language, pp. 640–667.
- Schiffrin, Deborah. 1985b. Everyday argument: The organization of diversity in talk. Handbook of discourse analysis 3, pp. 35–46.
- Schiffrin, Deborah. 1986. Functions of and in discourse. Journal of Pragmatics 10(1), pp. 41–66.
- Schiffirin, Deborah. 1987. Discourse Markers. Cambridge, England: Cambridge University Press.
- Schiffrin, Deborah. 1988. Discourse markers
- Fasold, Ralph and Deborah Schiffrin, eds. 1989. Linguistic Change and Variation, benjamins.com; accessed July 30, 2017.
- Schiffrin, Deborah. 1990. The management of a co-operative self during argument: The role of opinions and stories. Conflict talk. pp. 241–59. Cambridge England: Cambridge University Press. (Reprinted in J. Corner and J. Hawthorn (Eds.). (1993). Communication studies: A reader. London, England: Edward Arnold.)
- Schiffrin, Deborah. 1994. Approaches to discourse. Oxford, England: Blackwell.
- Schiffrin, Deborah. 1996a. Interactional sociolinguistics. Sociolinguistics and language teaching 4. pp. 307–28.
- Schiffrin, Deborah. 1996b. Narrative as self-portrait: Sociolinguistic constructions of identity. Language in society 25(2). 167–203.
- Schiffrin, Deborah. 1998. Approaches to discourse. Journal of Pragmatics 3(29). 355–359.
- Schiffrin, Deborah. 2001a. Discourse markers: Language, meaning, and context. In D. Schiffrin, D. Tannen, & H. Hamilton (Eds.), The handbook of discourse analysis 1. 54–75. Oxford, England: Blackwell.
- Schiffrin, Deborah. 2001b. Language, experience and history: What "happened" in World War II. Journal of Sociolinguistics, 5(3), 323–352.
- Schiffrin, Deborah. 2001c. Language and public memorial: "America's concentration camps." Discourse and Society, 12, 505–534.
- Schiffrin, Deborah. 2002. Mother and friends in a Holocaust survivor oral history. Language in Society, 31(3), 309–354.
- Schiffrin, Deborah. 2006a. In other words: Variation in reference and narrative. Cambridge, England: Cambridge University Press.
- Schiffrin, D. 2006. In other words: Variation in reference and narrative, vol 21, Cambridge University Press.
- Schiffrin, Deborah. 2006b. From linguistic reference to social identity. In De Fina, Anna, Deborah Schiffrin & Michael Bamberg. 2006c. Discourse and identity, vol 23. Cambridge: Cambridge University Press
- Bamberg, Michael, Anna De Fina & Deborah Schiffrin. 2007. Selves and identities in narrative and discourse, vol 9. John Benjamins Publishing.
- Bamberg, Michael, Anna De Fina & Deborah Schiffrin. 2011. Discourse and identity construction. Handbook of identity theory and research, pp. 177–99, Springer Publishing.
- Tannen, Deborah, Heidi E. Hamilton & Deborah Schiffrin. 2015. The handbook of discourse analysis, John Wiley & Sons.
