= William Labov =

American linguist; father of sociolinguistics (1927–2024)

- Labov in 1990
- Born: December 4, 1927; Passaic, New Jersey, U.S.
- Died: December 17, 2024 (aged 97); Philadelphia, Pennsylvania, U.S.
- Occupations: Industrial chemist (1949–60); Professor of linguistics (1964‍–‍2014)
- Known for: Variationist sociolinguistics
- Spouses: Teresa Gnasso; Gillian Sankoff (m. 1993)
- Children: 7, including Alice Goffman

Academic background
- Education: Harvard University (BA); Columbia University (MA, PhD)
- Doctoral advisor: Uriel Weinreich

Academic work
- Discipline: Linguist
- Institutions: Columbia University; University of Pennsylvania
- Notable ideas: Covert prestige

Notes
- Labov's curriculum vitae

William David Labov (/ləˈboʊv/ lə-BOHV; December 4, 1927 – December 17, 2024) was an American linguist widely regarded as the founder of the discipline of variationist sociolinguistics. He has been described as "an enormously original and influential figure who has created much of the methodology" of sociolinguistics, and "one of the most influential linguists of the 20th and 21st centuries".

Labov was a professor in the linguistics department of the University of Pennsylvania in Philadelphia and pursued research in sociolinguistics, language change, and dialectology. He retired in 2015 but continued to publish research until his death in 2024.

== Early life and education ==
Labov was born in Passaic, New Jersey, to Benjamin Labov, a Russian-Jewish immigrant, and Rhea (née White). According to Labov, the physician who delivered him was William Carlos Williams. He was raised in Rutherford, moving to Fort Lee at age 12. He attended Harvard University, where he majored in English and philosophy and studied chemistry. He graduated from Harvard in 1948.

== Career ==
After graduating from Harvard, Labov worked as an industrial chemist in his family's business (1949–1961) before turning to linguistics. For his MA thesis (1963), he completed a study of change in the dialect of Martha's Vineyard, which he presented before the Linguistic Society of America. Labov earned his PhD (1964) at Columbia University, studying under Uriel Weinreich. He was an assistant professor of linguistics at Columbia (1964–70) before becoming an associate professor at the University of Pennsylvania in 1971, then a full professor, and in 1976 becoming director of the university's Linguistics Laboratory.

== Linguistic research ==
The methods Labov used to collect data for his study of the varieties of English spoken in New York City, published as The Social Stratification of English in New York City (1966), have been influential in social dialectology. In the late 1960s and early 1970s, his studies of the linguistic features of African American Vernacular English (AAVE) were also influential: he argued that AAVE should not be stigmatized as substandard, but rather respected as a variety of English with its own grammatical rules.

He also pursued research in referential indeterminacy and is noted for his studies of the way ordinary people structure narrative stories of their own lives. Several of his classes were service-based, with students going to West Philadelphia to help tutor young children while simultaneously learning linguistics from different dialects such as AAVE.

Later, Labov studied ongoing changes in the phonology of English as spoken in the U.S., as well as the origins and patterns of chain shifts of vowels (one sound replacing a second, replacing a third, in a complete chain). In the Atlas of North American English (2006), he and his co-authors find three major divergent chain shifts taking place today: a Southern Shift (in Appalachia and southern coastal regions); a Northern Cities Vowel Shift affecting a region from Madison, Wisconsin, east to Utica, New York; and a Canadian Shift affecting most of Canada, in addition to several minor chain shifts in smaller regions.

Among Labov's well-known students are Charles Boberg, Anne H. Charity Hudley, Penelope Eckert, Gregory Guy, Robert A. Leonard, Geoffrey Nunberg, Shana Poplack, and John R. Rickford. His methods were adopted in England around 1972 by Peter Trudgill for Norwich speech and K. M. Petyt for West Yorkshire speech. On a sabbatical in England shortly after, J. K. Chambers, reading Trudgill's tattered copy of Sociolinguistic Patterns, left formal linguistics to become a sociolinguist.

Labov's works include The Study of Nonstandard English (1969), Language in the Inner City: Studies in Black English Vernacular (1972), Sociolinguistic Patterns (1972), Principles of Linguistic Change (vol. I Internal Factors, 1994; vol. II Social Factors, 2001, vol. III Cognitive and Cultural Factors, 2010), and, with Sharon Ash and Charles Boberg, The Atlas of North American English (2006).

The Franklin Institute awarded Labov the 2013 Benjamin Franklin Medal in Computer and Cognitive Science, citing him for "establishing the cognitive basis of language variation and change through rigorous analysis of linguistic data, and for the study of non-standard dialects with significant social and cultural implications".

== Language in use ==
In "Narrative Analysis: Oral Versions of Personal Experience", Labov and Joshua Waletzky take a sociolinguistic approach to examine how language works between people. This is significant because it contextualizes the study of structure and form, connecting purpose to method. His stated purpose is to "isolate the elements of narrative". This work focuses exclusively on oral narratives.

Labov describes narrative as having two functions: referential and evaluative, with its referential functions orienting and grounding a story in its contextual world by referencing events in sequential order as they originally occurred and its evaluative functions describing the storyteller's purpose in telling the story. Formally analyzing data from orally generated texts obtained via observed group interaction and interview (600 interviews were taken from several studies whose participants included ethnically diverse groups of children and adults from various backgrounds), Labov divides narrative into five or six sections:

- Abstract – gives an overview of the story.
- Orientation – Labov describes this as "referential [free clauses that] serve to orient the listener in respect to person, place, time, and behavioral situation". He specifies that these are contextual clues that precede the main story.
- Complicating action – the main story, during which the narrative unfolds. A story may consist of multiple complication sections.
- Evaluation – author evinces self-awareness, giving explicit or implicit purpose to the retelling of the story. Thus evaluation gives some indication of the significance the author attributes to their story. But evaluation can be done subtly: for instance, "lexical intensifiers [are a type of] semantically defined evaluation".
- Resolution – occurs sequentially following the evaluation. The resolution may give the story a sense of completion.
- Coda – returns listener to the present, drawing them back out of the world of the story into the world of the storytelling event. A coda is not essential to a narrative, and some narratives do not have one.

While not every narrative includes all these elements, the purpose of this subdivision is to show that narratives have inherent structural order. Labov argues that narrative units must retell events in the order they were experienced because narrative is temporally sequenced. In other words, events do not occur at random but are connected to one another; "the original semantic interpretation" depends on their original order. To demonstrate this sequence, he breaks a story down into its basic parts. He defines narrative clause as the "basic unit of narrative" around which everything else is built. Clauses can be distinguished from one another by temporal junctures, which indicate a shift in time and separate narrative clauses. Temporal junctures mark temporal sequencing because clauses cannot be rearranged without disrupting their meaning.

Labov and Waletzky's findings are important because they derived them from actual data rather than abstract theorization. Labov, Waletzky, etc., set up interviews and documented speech patterns in storytelling, keeping with the ethnographic tradition of tape-recording oral text so it can be referenced exactly. This inductive method creates a new system through which to understand story text.

== Linguistic principles ==
One of Labov's contributions to theories of language change is his Golden Age Principle (or Golden Age Theory). It claims that any changes in the sounds or the grammar that have come to conscious awareness in a speech community trigger a uniformly negative reaction.

Communities differ in the extent to which they stigmatize the newer forms of language, but I have never yet met anyone who greeted them with applause. Some older citizens welcome the new music and dances, the new electronic devices and computers. But no one has ever been heard to say, "It's wonderful the way young people talk today. It's so much better than the way we talked when I was a kid." ... The most general and most deeply held belief about language is the Golden Age Principle: At some time in the past, language was in a state of perfection. It is understood that in such a state, every sound was correct and beautiful, and every word and expression was proper, accurate, and appropriate. Furthermore, the decline from that state has been regular and persistent, so that every change represents a falling away from the golden age, rather than a return to it. Every new sound will be heard as ugly, and every new expression will be heard as improper, inaccurate, and inappropriate. Given this principle it is obvious that language change must be interpreted as nonconformity to established norms, and that people will reject changes in the structure of language when they become aware of them.

— William Labov, Principles of Linguistic Change, Vol. 2: Social Factors (2001), p. 514

== Scholarly influence and criticism ==
Labov's seminal work has been referenced and critically examined by a number of scholars, mainly for its structural rigidity. Kristin Langellier explains that "the purpose of Labovian analysis is to relate the formal properties of the narrative to their functions": clause-level analysis of how text affects transmission of message. This model has several flaws, which Langellier points out: it examines textual structure to the exclusion of context and audience, which often act to shape the text; it is relevant to a specific demographic (may be difficult to extrapolate); and, by categorizing the text at a clausal level, it burdens analysis with theoretical distinctions that may not be illuminating in practice. Anna De Fina remarks that [within Labov's model] "the defining property of narrative is temporal sequence, since the order in which the events are presented in the narrative is expected to match the original events as they occurred", which differs from more contemporary notions of storytelling, in which a naturally time-conscious flow includes jumping forward and back in time as mandated by, for example, anxieties felt about futures and their interplay with subsequent decisions. De Fina and Langellier both note that, though wonderfully descriptive, Labov's model is nevertheless difficult to code, thus potentially limited in application/practice. De Fina also agrees with Langellier that Labov's model ignores the complex and often quite relevant subject of intertextuality in narrative. To an extent, Labov evinces awareness of these concerns, saying "it is clear that these conclusions are restricted to the speech communities that we have examined", and "the overall structure of the narratives we've examined is not uniform". In "Rethinking Ventriloquism", Diane Goldstein uses Labovian notions of tellability—internal coherence in narrative—to inform her concept of untellability.

== Personal life and death ==
Labov had five children from his first marriage to Teresa Gnasso Labov: Susannah Page, Sarah Labov, Simon Labov, Joanna Labov, and Jessie Labov. In 1993, he married fellow sociolinguist Gillian Sankoff, and they had two children: Rebecca Labov and sociologist Alice Goffman, the latter of whom Labov adopted after the death of Sankoff's previous husband, Erving Goffman.

Labov died at his home in Philadelphia on December 17, 2024, at the age of 97 from complications due to Parkinson's disease.

== Honors ==
In 1968, Labov received the David H. Russell Award for Distinguished Research in Teaching English.

He was a Guggenheim Fellow in 1970–1971 and 1987–1988.

Labov received honorary doctorates from, among others, the Faculty of Humanities at Uppsala University (1985) and University of Edinburgh (2005).

In 1996, he won the Leonard Bloomfield Book Award from the Linguistic Society of America (LSA) for Principles of Linguistic Change, Vol. 1; he won the Award again in 2008 as a coauthor of the Atlas of North American English.

In 2013, Labov received a Franklin Institute Award in Computer and Cognitive Science for "establishing the cognitive basis of language variation and change through rigorous analysis of linguistic data, and for the study of non-standard dialects with significant social and cultural implications."

In 2013, Universitat Pompeu Fabra awarded Labov an honorary doctorate for "his brilliant teaching and research track record and for being one of the leading figures in the field of linguistics, founder of variationist and quantitative sociolinguistics".

In 2015, he was awarded the Neil and Saras Smith Medal for Linguistics by the British Academy "for lifetime achievement in the scholarly study of linguistics" and "his significant contribution to linguistics and the language sciences".

In 2020, Labov was awarded the American Academy of Arts and Sciences' Talcott Parsons Prize, recognizing "distinguished and original contributions to the social sciences".
