= Lawrence Solan =

American linguist (1952–2024)

Lawrence M. Solan
- Born: May 7, 1952; New York City, U.S.
- Died: March 2, 2024 (aged 71)
- Education: Brandeis University (B.A. 1974); University of Massachusetts (Ph.D., Linguistics 1978); Harvard Law School (J.D. 1982)
- Occupation: Law professor
- Employer: Brooklyn Law School
- Known for: study of the way in which linguistic analysis can inform the legal system
- Title: Don Forchelli Professor of Law and Director of the Center for the Study of Law, Language and Cognition

Lawrence M. Solan (May 7, 1952 – March 2, 2024) was an American academic who was the Don Forchelli Professor of Law and Director of the Center for the Study of Law, Language and Cognition at Brooklyn Law School.

== Biography ==
=== Background ===
Lawrence M. Solan was born in New York City to Harold and Shirley Solan. He grew up in Teaneck, New Jersey.

Solan obtained a B.A. summa cum laude from Brandeis University in 1974, a Ph.D. in Linguistics from the University of Massachusetts, Amherst, in 1978, and a J.D. from Harvard Law School in 1982.

Solan died on March 2, 2024, at the age of 71.

=== Legal career ===
Solan was a law clerk for Justice Stewart G. Pollock of the Supreme Court of New Jersey from 1982–83. He was later an associate and then a partner in the New York City law firm of Orans, Elsen and Lupert, from 1983–96, focusing on complex civil litigation.

He joined the faculty of Brooklyn Law School in 1996, where Solan was the Don Forchelli Professor of Law and Director of the Center for the Study of Law, Language and Cognition. Much of his academic legal career was devoted to studying and writing about the way in which linguistic analysis can inform the legal system, and he taught courses on the subject at Brooklyn Law School, Yale Law School, and in the Psychology Department and Linguistics Program at Princeton University. In 2009, he was named Honorary Professor at the Wuhan Institute of Technology.

Among Solan's books are The Language of Judges (2010), The Language of Statutes: Laws and Their Interpretation (2010), and (with Peter Tiersma) Speaking of Crime: The Language of Criminal Justice.

Solan was President of the International Association of Forensic Linguistics. He also served on the board of the International Academy of Law and Mental Health, and the editorial board of the International Journal of Speech, Language and the Law.
