= Gillian Sankoff =

American sociolinguist (born 1943)

- Born: March 6, 1943 (age 83)
- Occupation: Linguist
- Spouses: David Sankoff; Erving Goffman (m. 1981; died 1982); William Labov (m. 1993; died 2024)
- Children: Alice Goffman

Gillian Elizabeth Sankoff (/ˈɡɪliən/; born March 6, 1943) is a Canadian-American sociolinguist, and professor emerita of linguistics at the University of Pennsylvania. Sankoff's notable former students include Miriam Meyerhoff.

== Biography ==
She earned her PhD in 1968 from McGill University, with a dissertation entitled, Social aspects of multilingualism in New Guinea.

She is known for her work on Montréal French, on pidgin and creole languages (in particular, Tok Pisin), and on how speakers' use of language changes over the course of their lifespans. Her contributions to the development of the variationist approach to sociolinguistics are documented in interviews featured in Tagliamonte's (2015) history of the field.

She was married to Canadian mathematician David Sankoff, then to Canadian-American sociologist Erving Goffman from 1981 to his death in 1982, and subsequently married American sociolinguist William Labov in 1993. She is the mother of sociologist Alice Goffman.

== Honors ==
In 1986 she received a Guggenheim fellowship.

A Festschrift in her honor, Social Lives in Language, appeared in 2008. A special panel in her honor was organized as part of the NWAV 41 (2012) conference held at Indiana University.

She was named a fellow of the Linguistic Society of America (LSA) in 2018.

== Selected publications ==
- Gillian Sankoff and Hélène Blondeau. 2007. Language change across the lifespan: /r/ in Montreal French. Language 83, 560-588.
- Gillian Sankoff. 2001. Linguistic outcomes of language contact. In J.K. Chambers, P. Trudgill & Natalie Schilling-Estes (eds.), Handbook of Sociolinguistics. Oxford: Blackwell, 638-668.
- Gillian Sankoff. 2004. Adolescents, young adults and the critical period: two case studies from "Seven Up". In C. Fought (ed.), Sociolinguistic Variation: Critical Reflections. Oxford University Press, 121-139.
- Gillian Sankoff and Suzanne Laberge. 1973. On the acquisition of native speakers by a language. Kivung 6, 32-47.
- Gillian Sankoff and Penelope Brown. 1976. The origins of syntax in discourse: a case study of Tok Pisin relatives. Language 52, 631-666.
- Gillian Sankoff et al. 1997. Variation in the use of discourse markers in a language contact situation. Language Variation and Change 9, 191-217.
