= Carol Stack =

American anthropologist

Carol B. Stack
- Education: Anthropology
- Occupation: Anthropologist/Writer
- Notable work: All Our Kin, Call to Home
- Awards: Prize for Critical Research in 1995, Guggenheim Fellowship, Rockefeller Fellowship, and Russel Sage Fellowships

Carol B. Stack (born 1940) is an American urban anthropologist who specialized in studies of African American networks, minority women, and youth. Stack has taken a strong role in several social sciences, and is professor emerita of Education in the Graduate School of Education at University of California, Berkeley.

She taught at Boston University and Duke University before becoming Professor of Social and Cultural Studies in Education at Berkeley.

She is the author of All Our Kin: Strategies for Survival in a Black Community and Call To Home: African Americans Reclaim the Rural South.

== Education ==
Stack received her master's degree in 1968 and her PhD in anthropology in 1972.

== Accomplishments and awards ==
Carol B. Stack was awarded the Prize for Critical Research in 1995 from the Society for the Anthropology of North America. She has also received many fellowships such as the Guggenheim, Rockefeller, and Russel Sage Fellowships.

== Publications ==
- All Our Kin: Strategies for Survival in a Black Community (1974, Harper and Row: ISBN 9780061319822; latest reissue 2003, Basic Books: ISBN 9780061319822)
- Call To Home: African-Americans Reclaim The Rural South (1996, Basic Books: ISBN 9780465008087; latest reissue 2003: ISBN 9780465008087)

== All Our Kin: Strategies for Survival in a Black Community ==
Carol Stack's All Our Kin is a classic ethnography from the early 1970s. Her 1974 book All Our Kin has been described as "a classic of urban sociology", "one of the earliest and most popular accounts of how [black kinship] all works" and "influential". All Our Kin is the chronicle of a young white woman's sojourn into The Flats, an African-American ghetto community, to study the support system family and friends form when coping with poverty. The book challenged anti-Black stereotypes and is a pioneering example of research involving families and social structure in American communities. The book portrays of the social networks and value systems that evolved within African-American communities to combat grinding poverty. In communities plagued by single-parent families and joblessness, the book chronicles intense loyalties and an intricate trading system that ensures survival. All Our Kin challenges white America to reevaluate its notion of family.

== Call To Home: African Americans Reclaim the Rural South ==
Call To Home: African Americans Reclaim the Rural South examines the return of half a million black Americans to the rural South. At the time of publishing, many books had already focused on the black migration out of the South into Northern cities. Stack highlights the reverse trend: between 1970 and 1990, half a million African-Americans moved back south. Some of these destinations included the least promising places in all of America—places the Department of Agriculture calls “Persistent Poverty Counties.” The book's style integrates personal narrative and socioeconomic analysis of migration, poverty, and the urban underclass.
