= International Association for Forensic and Legal Linguistics =

The International Association for Forensic and Legal Linguistics (IAFLL), until 2021 called the 'International Association of Forensic Linguists', is a professional organization consisting primarily of linguists working in fields related to the area of language and law, or forensic linguistics. Areas of expertise include (but are not limited to) authorship attribution, disputed confessions, trademark issues, legal language, and language in the legal process, including the experiences of vulnerable groups such as children, people with intellectual impairment, victims of sexual offences, non-native speakers, and indigenous communities. In addition to linguists, the association has members from other professions related to language and the law, particularly members of the legal profession. It was founded in 1993 by Professor Malcolm Coulthard.

The current President is Professor Tammy Gales, Vice-President Dr Nicci MacLeod, Immediate Past President Dr Jennifer Glougie, Secretary Dr Annina Heini, Communications Officer Dr Dana Roemling, and Treasurer Dr David Griffin. Current Members at Large are Dr Zakeera Docrat, Professor Eliseu Mabasso and Dr Karoline Marko. Past presidents have included Professor Lawrence Solan, Professor Diana Eades, Professor Peter Tiersma, Professor Ron Butters, and Professor Tim Grant.

The IAFLL holds biennial international conferences, which have been held across Africa, Asia, Australia, Europe and North America, and regional conferences in the intervening years. Membership of the Association includes subscription to the International Journal of Speech, Language and the Law (formerly Forensic Linguistics), a peer-reviewed journal that publishes articles on any aspect of forensic language, speech and audio analysis. The board of editors includes Philipp Angermeyer, Peter French, Alison May, and Kirsty McDougall.

== Controversy ==
In 2008, lawyers hired by the one-man company Nemesysco threatened with legal actions unless the article "Charlatanry in forensic speech science", published in International Journal of Speech, Language and the Law in 2007, was withdrawn. The publisher Equinox decided to withdraw the article from the online version of the magazine, and offered the company to publish a letter in the journal, an offer they never took. In the article, a commercial product sold by the company was criticized as based on pseudo-science, and the company was not given the chance to comment before the article was published. The withdrawal resulted in criticism of the publisher for not understanding how to manage a scientific journal. The Royal Swedish Academy of Sciences branded the company's behavior a "serious assault on research freedom".
