= John R. Rickford =

Guyanese-American linguist (born 1949)

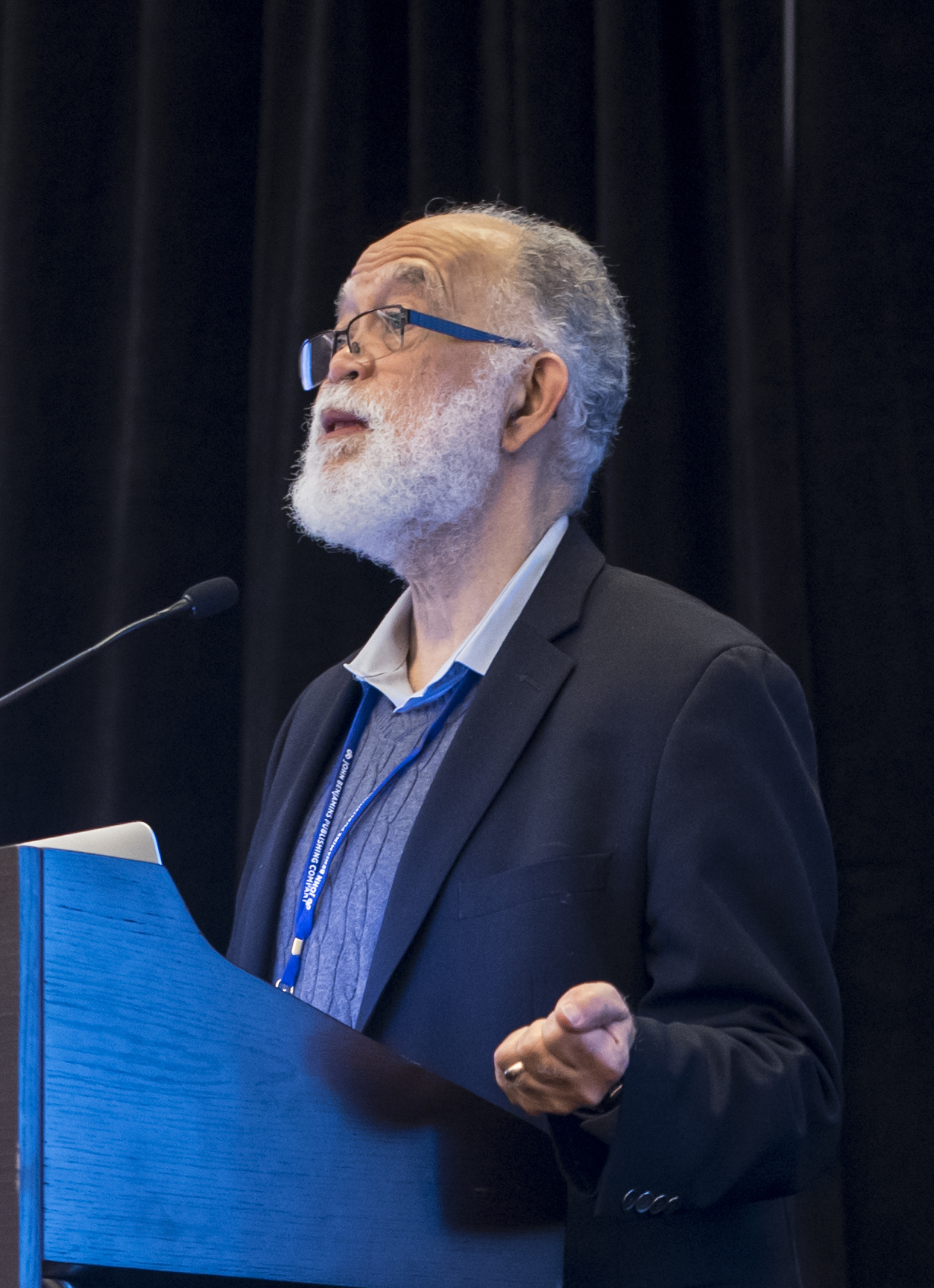
- Rickford speaks as president of the Linguistic Society of America in 2016
- Born: John Russell Rickford; September 16, 1949 (age 76)
- Education: University of California, Santa Cruz; University of Pennsylvania
- Occupations: Academic and author
- Employer: Stanford University

John Russell Rickford (born September 16, 1949) is a Guyanese-American linguist. Rickford is the J. E. Wallace Sterling Professor of Linguistics and the Humanities at Stanford University's Department of Linguistics and the Stanford Graduate School of Education, where he has taught since 1980. His book Spoken Soul: The Story of Black English, which he wrote together with his son, Russell J. Rickford, won the American Book Award in 2000.

== Life and work ==
=== Education ===
Rickford earned his B.A. in sociolinguistics at the University of California, Santa Cruz (1968–1971), on a Fulbright undergraduate scholarship. He continued his education at the University of Pennsylvania where he earned his MA in linguistics (1971–1973) and later his PhD in linguistics in 1979.

=== Professional career ===
Before working at Stanford University, Rickford held lectures in linguistics at the University of Guyana and was named Assistant Dean, Faculty of Arts, between 1979 and 1980. He later started teaching at Stanford University in 1980 as a Visiting Assistant Linguistics Professor before being named associate professor, with tenure, in linguistics (1986). While working in the United States, Rickford has kept contact with the University of Guyana as external examiner for linguistics courses, MA, and PhD theses (1982–present).

== Field of expertise ==
Rickford's sociolinguistic research focuses on the relation between language variation and ethnicity, social class, variation and change. He is especially interested in the varieties of English spoken by marginalized communities in relation to ethical and economical characteristics. His research focuses on African-American Vernacular English (AAVE) or Ebonics, spoken by many African Americans and the role linguistics plays in the educational context. Through his work, Rickford aims to close linguistic gaps across cultures.

Rickford's expertise is African-American Vernacular English, which garnered national attention in the U.S. when the Oakland, California school board recognized the variety as an official dialect of English and educated teachers in its use. Rickford argues that AAVE is systematic and rule-governed like all natural speech. Rickford has researched and written extensively on the topic and was an outspoken supporter of the decision.

Rickford also engages in research regarding pidgin and creole languages. Most of his data comes from English-based creoles of the Caribbean, especially, Guyanese Creole, Jamaican and Barbadian and American English.

=== Memberships in professional societies ===
- Elected to the American Academy of Arts and Sciences (2017)
- Member of the U. S. National Academy of Sciences (2021)

== Selected publications ==
- (Ed.), A Festival of Guyanese Words. Georgetown: University of Guyana. Second edition, revised and expanded, 1978.
- Dimensions of a Creole Continuum, Stanford (1987): Stanford University Press.
- African American English, eds. Salikoko S. Mufwene, John R. Rickford, Guy Bailey and John Baugh. London: Routledge, 1998.
- African American Vernacular English: Features and Use, Evolution, and Educational Implications, Oxford (1999): Blackwell.
- Spoken Soul: The Story of Black English (with Russell J. Rickford). New York: John Wiley, 2000. [Winner of a 2000 American Book Award]
- Language in the USA: Themes for the Twenty-First Century, ed. (with Edward Finegan). Cambridge: Cambridge University Press, 2004.
- Raciolinguistics: How Language Shapes Our Ideas About Race, eds. H. Samy Alim, John R. Rickford and Arnetha F. Ball. Oxford: Oxford University Press, 2016.

== Personal life ==
Rickford is married to professor Angela Rickford, and they have four children.
