= Daniel Silverman =

American linguist (born 1963)

Daniel Doron Silverman
- Born: 1963 (age 62–63)

Academic background
- Education: University of California, Los Angeles (PhD)
- Thesis: Phasing and Recoverability (1995)
- Academic advisors: Donca Steriade, Bruce Hayes, Pat Keating, Peter Ladefoged, Henning Anderson, Donka Minkova, Ian Maddieson, Jody Kreiman

Academic work
- Discipline: linguistics
- Sub-discipline: phonetics, phonology
- Institutions: San José State University

Daniel Doron Silverman (born 1963) is an American linguist and associate professor of linguistics at San José State University. He is known for his works on phonetics and phonology.

== Books ==
- In progress. Degenerative Phonology.
- 2017. A Critical Introduction to Phonology: Functional and Usage-Based Perspectives (2nd Edition). London: Bloomsbury Academic.
- 2012. Neutralization (Rhyme and Reason in Phonology). Cambridge University Press.
- 2006. A Critical Introduction to Phonology: of Sound, Mind, and Body. London/New York: Continuum.
- 1997. Phasing and Recoverability. New York: Garland.
- 1984. Deaf Not Daft: a Reappraisal of Language for the Deaf. Edinburgh: Scottish Workshop Publications.
