= Taehong Cho =

South Korean linguist (born 1966)

- Born: 1966 (age 59–60)
- Citizenship: South Korean
- Education: University of California, Los Angeles (PhD)
- Scientific career
- Fields: Linguistics
- Institutions: Hanyang University, Max Planck Institute for Psycholinguistics
- Thesis: Effects of Prosody on Articulation in English (2001)
- Doctoral advisor: Patricia Keating; Sun-Ah Jun
- Other academic advisors: Peter Ladefoged; Bruce Hayes; Jody Kreiman
- Website: https://tcho.hanyang.ac.kr/home

Taehong Cho (Korean: 조태홍; born 1966) is a South Korean linguist and Professor of Linguistics (HYU Distinguished Research Fellow) at Hanyang University. He is the editor-in-chief of the Journal of Phonetics and a member of the editorial board of Laboratory Phonology. Cho is known for his works on phonetics, laboratory phonology, speech production and speech perception.

== Select publications ==
- The Effects of Prosody on Articulation in English, Routledge 2002
- Cho, T., & Ladefoged, P. (1999). Variation and universals in VOT: evidence from 18 languages. Journal of Phonetics, 27(2), 207–229. doi:10.1006/jpho.1999.0094
- Cho, T., Jun, S.-A., & Ladefoged, P. (2002). Acoustic and aerodynamic correlates of Korean stops and fricatives. Journal of Phonetics, 30(2), 193–228. doi:10.1006/jpho.2001.0153 (https://doi.org/10.1006/jpho.2001.0153)
