= Marc Garellek =

Canadian linguist

- Awards: NSF grant Hellman Fellowship

Academic background
- Education: University of California, Los Angeles (PhD); McGill University (BA)
- Thesis: Production and perception of glottal stops (2013)
- Doctoral advisor: Patricia Keating
- Other advisors: Abeer Alwan; Sun-Ah Jun; Jody Kreiman; Megha Sundara

Academic work
- Discipline: linguistics
- Sub-discipline: phonetics, laboratory phonology
- Institutions: UC San Diego
- Main interests: Speech production, speech perception, voice quality

Marc Garellek (/gəˈrɛlɪk/) is a Canadian linguist and Professor of Linguistics at the University of California, San Diego. He is known for his works on phonetics and laboratory phonology, most of which deal with glottal activity and phonation.

== Select publications ==
- Daland, R., Hayes, B., White, J., Garellek, M., Davis, A., & Norrmann, I. (2011). Explaining sonority projection effects. Phonology, 28(02), 197–234. doi:10.1017/S0952675711000145
- Garellek, M., & Keating, P. (2011). The acoustic consequences of phonation and tone interactions in Jalapa Mazatec. Journal of the International Phonetic Association, 41(02), 185–205. doi:10.1017/S0025100311000193
- Garellek, M. (2014). Voice quality strengthening and glottalization. Journal of Phonetics, 45, 106–113. doi:10.1016/j.wocn.2014.04.001
- Garellek, Marc, Keating, Patricia, Esposito, Christina M., & Kreiman, Jody. (2013). Voice quality and tone identification in White Hmong. The Journal of the Acoustical Society of America, 133(2), 1078-1089
