= Caroline Smith =

Caroline Smith may refer to:

- Caroline Smith (diver) (1906–1994), American Olympic diver
- Caroline Estes Smith (1877–1970), manager of the Philharmonic Orchestra of Los Angeles
- Carol Smith (radio presenter) (Caroline Jane Smith, born 1975), Singaporean radio presenter
- Caroline Smith, American singer and songwriter, known since 2018 as Your Smith
- Caroline Smith (set decorator) (fl. 2025)
- Caroline Smith (geologist), British scientist and Principal Curator of Meteorites at the Natural History Museum (UK)
- Caroline Smith (linguist), American linguist
- Caroline Miner Smith, known as Siiickbrain, American singer and model
- Caroline Smith (badminton) in European Universities Badminton Championships
- Caroline Smith (soccer) in 2009 W-League
- Caroline Smith (triathlete) in 2008 Ironman 70.3 World Championship
