= Bohn =

Bohn is a German surname. Notable people with the surname include:

- Adam Bohn, video game developer and founder of Artix Entertainment
- Carsten Bohn (born 1948), German musician
- Frank P. Bohn (1866–1944), U.S. Representative from Michigan
- German von Bohn (1812–1899), German painter
- Hans Bohn (1891–1980), German graphic artist and typographer
- Henry George Bohn (1796–1884), British publisher
- James George Stuart Burges Bohn, British bookseller and bibliographer, brother of Henry George Bohn
- Jason Bohn (born 1973), American golfer
- John Bohn (1867–1955), mayor of Milwaukee, Wisconsin
- Ocke-Schwen Bohn (born 1953), German linguist
- Parker Bohn III (born 1963), American bowler
- Paul Bohn (born 1955), American chemist
- T. J. Bohn (born 1980), American baseball player
- Christoph Bohn (born 1960), Belgian film director

== See also ==
- Bøhn
