= Holger Mitterer =

German cognitive scientist (born 1973)

- Born: 4 January 1973 (age 53); Hanau, Germany
- Education: University of Maastricht (PhD); Bielefeld University; University of Leiden
- Known for: computational architecture of spoken-word recognition, applied psycholinguistics
- Awards: Excellence Initiative (2017); DFG grant
- Scientific career
- Fields: Cognitive neuroscience, linguistics, experimental psychology
- Institutions: University of Malta; Max Planck Institute for Psycholinguistics; University of Tübingen
- Thesis: Understanding 'gardem bench': Studies on the perception of assimilated words forms (2003)
- Academic advisors: Odmar Neumann; Alexander van der Heijden
- Website: http://www.holgermitterer.eu/

Holger Mitterer (born 4 January 1973) is a German cognitive scientist and linguist and associate professor at the University of Malta. He is known for his works on applied psycholinguistics. Mitterer is co-editor-in-chief with Cynthia Clopper of Language and Speech. He is a former associate editor of Laboratory Phonology (2013-2018) and a member of the editorial board of the Journal of Phonetics.

== Select publications ==
- Mitterer, H., & Reinisch, E., & McQueen, J.M. (2018). Allophones, not phonemes in spoken-word recognition. Journal of Memory and Language. doi: 10.1016/j.jml.2017.09.005
- Mitterer, H. (2018). Not all geminates are created equal: Evidence from Maltese glottal consonants. Journal of Phonetics, 66, 28–44. doi:10.1016/j.wocn.2017.09.003
- Mitterer, H., & Reinisch, E. (2015). Letters don't matter: No effect of orthography on the perception of conversational speech. Journal of Memory and Language, 85, 116–134. doi:10.1016/j.jml.2015.08.005
- Mitterer, H., Scharenborg, O., & McQueen, J.M. (2013). Phonological abstraction without phonemes in speech perception. Cognition, 129, 356–361. doi:10.1016/j.cognition.2013.07.011
- Mitterer, H., & McQueen, J.M. (2009). Foreign subtitles help but native-language subtitles harm foreign speech perception. PLoS One, 4, A146-A150. doi:10.1371/journal.pone.0007785
- Escudero, P., Hayes-Harb, R., & Mitterer, H. (2008). Novel second-language words and asymmetric lexical access. Journal of Phonetics, 36(2), 345–360. doi:10.1016/j.wocn.2007.11.002
- Ruiter, J.-P. de, Mitterer, H., & Enfield, N. J. (2006). Projecting the End of a Speaker's Turn: A Cognitive Cornerstone of Conversation. Language, 82(3), 515–535. doi:10.1353/lan.2006.0130
