= Steriade =

Steriade is a surname. Notable people with the surname include:

- Mircea Steriade
- Donca Steriade
