= Unni Wilhelmsen =

Norwegian singer, songwriter, and musician

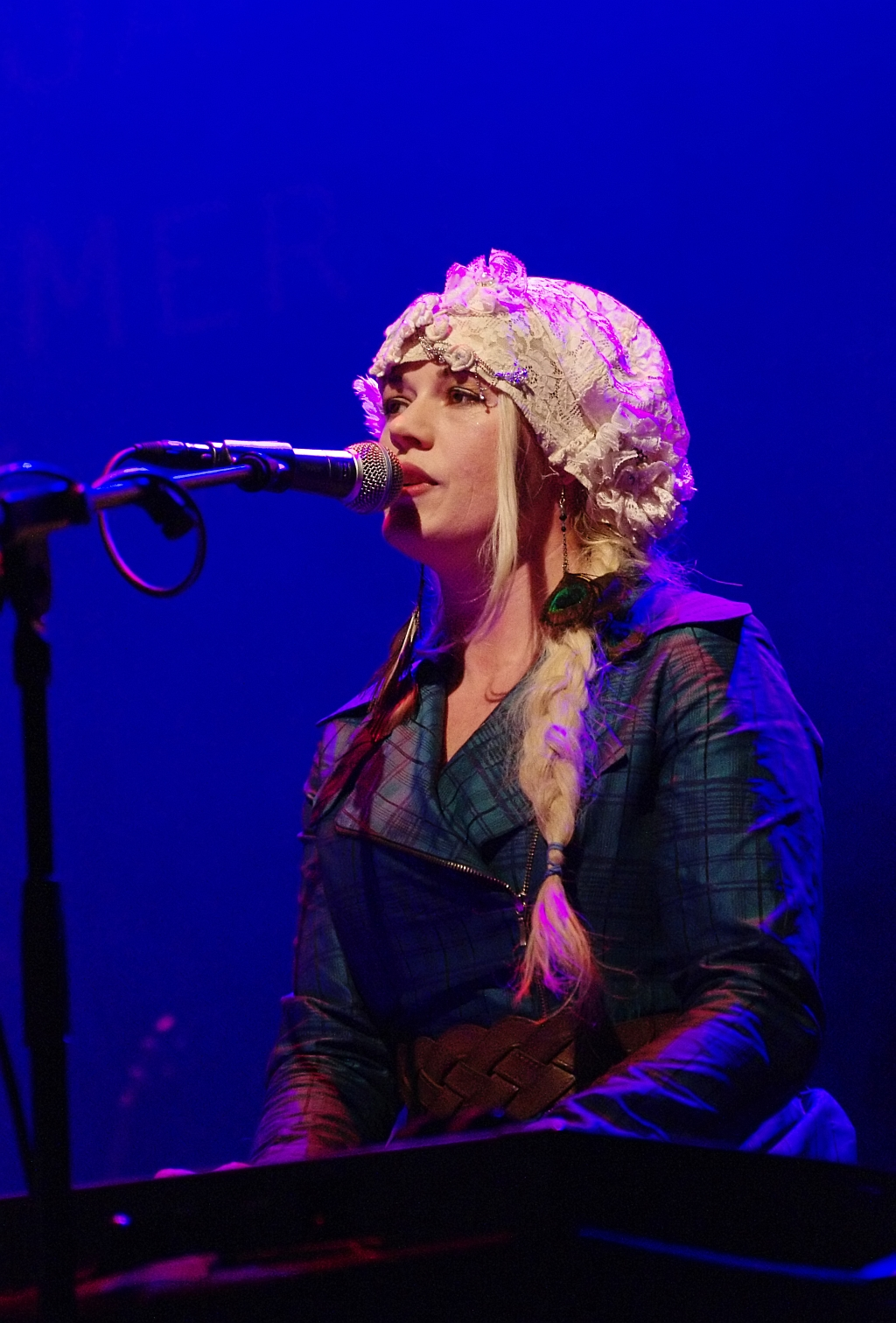
- Unni Wilhelmsen in concert in 2011

Background information
- Born: Unni Elisabeth Wilhelmsen; 12 July 1971 (age 54); Oslo, Norway
- Genres: Pop, folk rock
- Occupation: Singer
- Instruments: Guitar, piano
- Website: unniwilhelmsen.com

Unni Elisabeth Wilhelmsen (born 12 July 1971) is a Norwegian singer, songwriter, and musician. Her musical influences are pop music and the American tradition of the singer-songwriter in which the lyrics play an important role as well as the music. She lives in Oslo but has throughout her career had the whole of Norway as a venue. When she made her breakthrough in 1996 with her debut album To Whom It May Concern (Polygram), she became an important mediator of the singer-songwriter genre, a genre that has a broad audience in Norwegian popular music.

== Career ==
Wilhelmsen was born in Oslo. She was given a guitar as a teenager and so the guitar became her first instrument. However, she had always dreamed of playing the piano, and later took it up. Her first tune featuring the piano came in 2006. She writes most of her music herself, but from time to time collaborates with others. Wilhelmsen is a full-time musician and releases her music on her own indie label, St. Cecilia Music. In addition to pursuing her solo career, in September 2013, Unni joined the Norwegian band "Di Derre" as a guitarist and vocalist.

Her debut as singer was at Smuget in Oslo, where music journalist Finn Bjelke was present. He liked what he heard and mentioned her to music producer Ole Evenrud at Polygram. This led to her first record contract, and her debut album To Whom It May Concern was released on Polygram 1996. She was awarded Spellemannprisen 1996 in two categories for this album. International release on Universal Music of To whom it may concern in Germany followed, but her international career was slow to develop. She started her own record company to be in charge. Now her audience outside Norway is growing; in effect she functions as her own distributor and a subcontractor for her former label, Universal.

== Private life ==
Wilhelmsen lives in Oslo, Norway. She has installed her own studio in the kitchen, Fett Studio, and most of her album Til Meg (St. Cecilia Music, 2006) was recorded there.

== Discography ==
- To Whom It May Concern (Polygram, 1996), produced by Bugge Wesseltoft at the studio Bugges Room
- Definitely me (Polygram, 1997), produced by Bugge Wesseltoft at Oslo Lydstudio
- Back in the blonde (Universal Music, 2000), produced by Malcolm Burn at Clovet St. Studio
- Disconnected (Universal Music, 2001), produced by Ronni Le Tekrø and Knut Bøhn at Øya Studio
- Hurricane's eye (St. Cecilia Music, 2003), produced by Kjetil Saunes at Høytoglavt Studio
- Til Meg (St. Cecilia Music, 2006)
- 7 (St. Cecilia Music, 2010)
- Live With Bodø Rhythm Group feat. Bodø Sinfonietta

== Honors ==
- Spellemannprisen 1996: female artist of the year; album of the year for To Whom It May Concern
