= Mariapaola D'Imperio =

Italian linguist

Academic background
- Education: Ohio State University (PhD)
- Thesis: The role of perception in defining tonal targets and their alignment (2000)
- Doctoral advisor: Mary E. Beckman; Keith Allan Johnson
- Other advisor: Elizabeth Hume

Academic work
- Discipline: linguistics
- Sub-discipline: laboratory phonology
- Institutions: Aix-Marseille University (2006-2018); Rutgers University (2019-2023)

Mariapaola D’Imperio is an Italian linguist known for her works on phonetics, prosody and laboratory phonology.

== Education ==
D’Imperio received her MA and Ph.D in linguistics from Ohio State University in 2000.

== Career ==
D’Imperio is a former distinguished professor at the Department of Linguistics at Rutgers University. As of June 2024, she is a professor at Aix-Marseille University.

D’Imperio is a member of the board of the ISCA, and is head of the Prosody Group at the Laboratoire Parole et Language (CNRS). She was an associate editor of the Journal of Phonetics from 2016 to 2023, and was president of the Association for Laboratory Phonology from 2018 to 2020.
