= Bruce Hayes =

Bruce Hayes may refer to:

- Bruce Hayes (linguist) (born 1955), professor of linguistics
- Bruce Hayes (swimmer) (born 1963), American swimmer

== See also ==
- Bruce Hay (1950–2007), rugby player
