= John Laver =

British phonetician (1938–2020)

John Laver CBE FBA FRSE
- Born: John David Michael Henry Laver; 20 January 1938; Nowshera, British India
- Died: 6 May 2020 (aged 82); Edinburgh, Scotland
- Occupation: Phonetician
- Notable work: The Phonetic Description of Voice Quality (1980); Principles of Phonetics (1994)

John David Michael Henry Laver, CBE, FBA, FRSE (20 January 1938 – 6 May 2020) was a British phonetician. He was Deputy Principal & Deputy Vice Patron as well as Emeritus professor of speech sciences at Edinburgh’s Queen Margaret University, and served as president of the International Phonetic Association from 1991 to 1995.

== Life and career ==
Laver was born in Nowshera, British India, to a father who was in the Indian and later the British Army. He was raised in India for six years and spoke Hindustani and English and later lived in Egypt, Libya, Kenya and Cyprus until the age of ten. After attending a boarding school in Hampshire, Laver entered the Royal Air Force College Cranwell to pursue a career as a military pilot, which he eventually gave up. He subsequently entered the University of Edinburgh in 1958 and graduated in 1962 with a degree in French language and French. At Edinburgh, he was introduced to phonetics and to the Department of Phonetics headed by David Abercrombie, under which he obtained a postgraduate diploma in 1963.

From 1963 to 1966, Laver was a lecturer at the University of Ibadan, Nigeria. Formally, his post at Ibadan lasted for three years, but in the second year he was substituted by John Kelly while Laver returned to Edinburgh in exchange. In 1966, he was appointed a lecturer at Edinburgh, where he received a PhD in 1975, presenting the thesis "Individual features in voice quality" supervised by Abercrombie. In 1985, he was appointed Professor of Phonetics at Edinburgh, where he later received a Doctor of Letters. He was president of the International Phonetic Association from 1991 to 1995.

He was elected a Fellow of the British Academy (FBA) in 1990 and a Fellow of the Royal Society of Edinburgh (FRSE) in 1994. In the 1999 New Year Honours, he was appointed a Commander of the Order of the British Empire (CBE) for services to phonetics.

In 2013, Trinity College Dublin awarded him an honorary doctorate.

With Ronald E. Asher, Laver served as general editor of The Encyclopedic Dictionary of Speech and Language for Wiley-Blackwell, which involved nearly 40 contributors and was completed in 2013 after about 25 years of preparation. During a period of Laver's illness, however, Wiley-Blackwell withdrew from the contract and reverted copyright to the contributors.

He died in Scotland on 6 May 2020 after a long illness.

== Personal life ==
Laver married his colleague Sandy Hutcheson in 1974.

== Selected publications ==
- Laver, John (1965). "Variability in Vowel Perception". Language and Speech. 8 (2): 95–121. doi:10.1177/002383096500800203. S2CID 141660044.
- Laver, John (1968). "Voice Quality and Indexical Information". British Journal of Disorders of Communication. 3 (1): 43–54. doi:10.3109/13682826809011440. PMID 5665923.
- Laver, John; Hutcheson, Sandy, eds. (1972). Communication in Face-to-Face Interaction: Selected Readings. Harmondsworth: Penguin. ISBN 0-14-080664-4.
- Jones, William E.; Laver, John, eds. (1973). Phonetics in Linguistics: A Book of Readings. London: Longman. ISBN 0-582-52451-2.
- Laver, John; Trudgill, Peter (1979). "Phonetic and linguistic markers in speech". In Scherer, Klaus R.; Giles, Howard (eds.). Social Markers in Speech. Cambridge University Press. pp. 1–32. ISBN 0-521-22321-0.
- Laver, John (1980). The Phonetic Description of Voice Quality. Cambridge University Press. ISBN 0-521-23176-0.
- Laver, John (1981). "The Analysis of Voice Quality: from the Classical Period to the Twentieth Century". In Asher, R. E.; Henderson, Eugene J. A. (eds.). Towards a History of Phonetics. Edinburgh University Press. pp. 79–99. ISBN 0-85224-374-X.
- Myers, Terry; Laver, John; Anderson, John, eds. (1981). The Cognitive Representation of Speech. North-Holland. ISBN 0-444-86162-9.
- Laver, John, ed. (1991). The Gift of Speech: Papers in the Analysis of Speech and Voice. Edinburgh University Press. ISBN 0-7486-0313-1.
- Laver, John (1992). "Voice quality". In Bright, William (ed.). International Encyclopedia of Linguistics. Vol. 4. Oxford, England: Pergamon. pp. 231–232. ISBN 0-19-505196-3.
- Laver, John (1994). Principles of Phonetics. Cambridge University Press. ISBN 0-521-45655-X.
- Laver, John (1994). "Speech". In Asher, R. E.; Simpson, J. M. Y. (eds.). Encyclopedia of Language and Linguistics. Vol. 8. Oxford, England: Pergamon. pp. 4101–4109. ISBN 0-08-035943-4.
- Hardcastle, William J.; Laver, John, eds. (1997). The Handbook of Phonetic Sciences. Wiley-Blackwell. ISBN 0-631-18848-7.
- Laver, John (2000). "Phonetic evaluation of voice quality". In Kent, Raymond D.; Ball, Martin J. (eds.). Voice Quality Measurement. San Diego: Singular. pp. 37–48. ISBN 1-56593-991-3.
- Laver, John (2001). "Linguistic Phonetics". In Aronoff, Mark; Rees-Miller, Janie (eds.). The Handbook of Linguistics. Blackwell. pp. 150–179. ISBN 0-631-20497-0.
