= Mary Beckman =

American linguist

Mary Esther Beckman
- Born: September 1953 (age 73)

Academic background
- Education: Cornell University (PhD)

Academic work
- Discipline: linguistics
- Sub-discipline: phonetics
- Institutions: Ohio State University
- Doctoral students: Keith Allan Johnson, Mariapaola D'Imperio

Mary Esther Beckman (born September 1953) is a Professor Emerita of Linguistics at the Ohio State University.

== Career ==
Beckman received her PhD from Cornell University in 1984. She was a Postdoctoral member of the technical staff in "Linguistics and Artificial Intelligence Research" at AT&T Bell Laboratories, Murray Hill, NJ, before joining the linguistics faculty at Ohio State University in 1985. She has directed at least twenty-five PhD dissertations to completion at Ohio State University.

Her early research focused on prosody and the development of the Tones and Boundary Indexes (ToBI) system of intonation transcription. More recently her work has focused on phonological disorders and child language acquisition.

Perhaps her most significant contribution to linguistics is the fact that in 1987, together with John Kingston, she organized the first Laboratory Phonology conference at Columbus, Ohio. She served with Kingston as series editor for the Cambridge University Press series Papers in Laboratory Phonology from 1987 through 2004. The laboratory phonology movement was one of the two most important developments during the 1990s in the linguistic subdisciplines that study language sound systems, and gave rise to the Association for Laboratory Phonology. (The other important development was Optimality Theory.)

== Honors and awards ==
In 1988 she won a Presidential Young Investigator Award from the National Science Foundation.

She edited the Journal of Phonetics from 1990 to 1994.

Beckman was inducted as a Fellow in the Linguistic Society of America in 2011. In 2015, she received the Scientific Achievement Medal of the International Speech Communication Association.

- Anneliese Maier Award (2014)

== Personal life ==
Beckman was married to John S. Cikoski, a specialist for Classical Chinese. Cikoski died in 2022.

== Selected publications ==
- Beckman, Mary E. (1986). Stress and Non-Stress Accent. Netherlands Phonetic Archives Series. Walter de Gruyter. ISBN 978-3-11-013729-3.
- Pierrehumbert, Janet B.; Mary E. Beckman (1988). Japanese Tone Structure. MIT Press. ISBN 978-0-262-16109-1.
- Kingston, John; Beckman, Mary (1990). Papers in Laboratory Phonology I: Between the Grammar and Physics of Speech. Cambridge University Press. ISBN 978-0-521-36238-2.
- Beckman, Mary, Ken de Jong, Sun-Ah Jun, & Sook-hyang Lee (1992) “The Interaction of Coarticulation and Prosody in Sound Change,” Language and Speech 35 (1, 2). pp. 45–58. doi:10.1177/002383099203500205
