= Bøhn =

Bøhn is a Norwegian surname. Notable people with the surname include:

- Karl Erik Bøhn (1965–2014), Norwegian handball player and coach
- Knut Bøhn (1926–1985), Norwegian businessman and judge
- Ole Bøhn (born 1945), Norwegian violinist

== See also ==
- Bohn, a German surname
