= Michael Hammond =

Michael or Mike Hammond may refer to:

- Michael Hammond (linguist) (born 1957), American linguist, academic and author
- Michael P. Hammond (1932–2002), American musician, educator and chairman of National Endowment for the Arts
- Peter Michael Hammond (1941–2021), British entomologist who specialised in beetles
- Mike Hammond (footballer) (1945–2018), Australian rules footballer
- Mike Hammond (ice hockey) (1990–2023), British centre on national team
- Michael Hammond, a fictional character in the web series Petscop

== See also ==
- Michael Hammond Bates (1920–1978), India-born British actor
