= Nancy E. Hill =

American developmental psychologist

- Occupation: Professor of Education
- Awards: APA Ernest R. Hilgard Lifetime Achievement Award (2018)

Academic background
- Education: Michigan State University; Ohio State University

Academic work
- Institutions: Harvard Graduate School of Education

Nancy E. Hill is an American developmental psychologist. She is the Charles Bigelow Professor of Education at the Harvard Graduate School of Education. Hill is an expert on the impact of parental involvement in adolescent development, cultural influences on minority youth development, and academic discourse socialization, defined as parents' academic beliefs, expectations, and behaviors that foster their children's academic and career goals.

Hill is President of the Society for Research in Child Development (term: 2021–2023) and has served on the Board on Children Youth and Families of the National Academies of Sciences, Engineering, and Medicine. In 2018, she received the Ernest R. Hilgard Lifetime Achievement Award from the American Psychological Association.

== Biography ==
Hill completed a B.S. degree in psychology with honors from the Ohio State University in 1989. She continued her education in developmental psychology at Michigan State University, where she received a M.A. degree in 1992 and a Ph.D. degree in 1994, under the supervision of Hiram E. Fitzgerald. Her graduate research focused on parent-child relationships and social mobility in African American families. From 1994 to 1996, Hill was a NIMH Postdoctoral Fellow at the Preventive Intervention Research Center of Arizona State University. She was faculty in the Department of Psychology at Duke University and at the University of North-Carolina Chapel Hill before joining the faculty of Harvard University in 2009.

Hill was awarded a Fellowship at the Radcliffe Institute for Advanced Study (2014–2015) and was a Distinguished Faculty Fellow of the William T. Grant Foundation (2013–2014). She is a contributor to U.S. News & World Report.

Hill's research has been supported by grants from the National Science Foundation, Institute of Education Sciences, National Institute of Child Health and Human Development, National Institute of Mental Health and the Spencer Foundation.

== Research ==
Hill's research program has focused on parental practices that guide children's academic development, which include setting expectations for school work, providing valuable learning strategies, and establishing beliefs about learning. Hill's co-authored article (with Diana Tyson) titled Parental involvement in middle school: a meta-analytic assessment of the strategies that promote achievement won the Social Policy Best Article Award from the Society for Research in Adolescence in 2010. This paper reported a meta-analysis of 50 studies, conducted over a span of 26 years with over 50,000 students, which focused on the effects of parental involvement on the academic development of adolescents. Hill and Tyson found that parental involvement during middle school increased children's academic and career success, with largest effects associated with academic socialization practices. Parental involvement helped children to think about the kind of jobs they wanted for themselves in the future and how to set academic goals (including selecting appropriate coursework) to reach their career goals. Research suggests that parental involved is especially important during the middle school years, when adolescents are beginning to think about going to college and need support to further their chances of getting into the college programs that match their interests.

Hill is co-author (with Alexis Redding) of The End of Adolescence: The Lost Art of Delaying Adulthood, which focuses on the transition to adulthood and the historical precedence and rationale for extending the time to adulthood. She has co-edited several volumes including African American Children and Mental Health, African American Family Life: Ecological and Cultural Diversity, and Families, Schools, and the Adolescent: Connecting Research, Policy, and Practice.

== Representative Publications ==
- Hill, N. E. (2001). Parenting and academic socialization as they relate to school readiness: The roles of ethnicity and family income. Journal of Educational Psychology, 93(4), 686–697.
- Hill, N. E., Castellino, D. R., Lansford, J. E., Nowlin, P., Dodge, K. A., Bates, J. E., & Pettit, G. S. (2004). Parent academic involvement as related to school behavior, achievement, and aspirations: Demographic variations across adolescence. Child Development, 75(5), 1491–1509.
- Hill, N. E., & Craft, S. A. (2003). Parent-school involvement and school performance: Mediated pathways among socioeconomically comparable African American and Euro-American families. Journal of Educational Psychology, 95(1), 74–83.
- Hill, N. E., & Redding, A. (2021). The End of Adolescence: The Lost Art of Delaying Adulthood. Harvard University Press.
- Hill, N. E., & Taylor, L. C. (2004). Parental school involvement and children's academic achievement: Pragmatics and issues. Current Directions in Psychological Science, 13(4), 161–164.
- Hill, N. E., & Tyson, D. F. (2009). Parental involvement in middle school: a meta-analytic assessment of the strategies that promote achievement. Developmental Psychology, 45(3), 740–763.
