= Ocke-Schwen Bohn =

German linguist

Ocke-Schwen Bohn (born in Kiel, Schleswig-Holstein, Germany, 14 May 1953) is professor emeritus of English Linguistics at Aarhus University in Denmark. He specializes in phonetics and psycholinguistics, especially second language and cross-language speech perception, foreign accented speech, and infant speech perception, and he has also conducted work on the phonetics of an endangered language (Föhr North Frisian), on interlanguage intelligibility, and on language in autobiographical memory. Bohn currently serves as member of the editorial board of Journal of Phonetics and Poznań Studies in Contemporary Linguistics. He also organized the 2016 edition of the International Symposium on the Acquisition of Second Language Speech (New Sounds) conference.

== Biography ==
Bohn received an M.A. ("Staatsexamen") in English and Geography from Kiel University in 1979, and Ph.D. ("dr. phil.") in English Linguistics from Kiel University in 1984. He completed a postdoctoral fellowship on an NIH grant (PI: James E. Flege) at the University of Alabama at Birmingham in 1989. Since 1996, he has been professor of English Linguistics at Aarhus University in Denmark.

== Research ==
Bohn is internationally recognized for his research on infant speech perception, cross-language speech perception, vowel perception, and second language speech. Bohn's collaborations in these areas have resulted in the influential Speech Learning Model and its revision, in insights on infant, native, and cross-language vowel perception (with Winifred Strange and with Diane Kewley-Port), in the discovery of universal patterns of infant vowel perception (with Linda Polka), and in the study of cross-language perception of a range of consonants and vowels (with Catherine Best and with Terry Gottfried). Bohn is probably best known for his Desensitization Hypothesis and for his work (with Linda Polka) on the Natural Referent Vowel framework. His work on second language speech has provided support for the assumption that the capacity for phonetic category formation remains intact over the life-span.
