= Phonetically Based Phonology =

Book edited by Bruce Hayes, Robert Kirchner, and Donca Steriade

- Author: Bruce Hayes, Robert Kirchner, and Donca Steriade (editors)
- Language: English
- Subject: phonology
- Publisher: Cambridge University Press
- Publication date: 2004
- Media type: Print (hardcover)

Phonetically Based Phonology is a 2004 book edited by Bruce Hayes, Robert Kirchner, and Donca Steriade in which the authors discuss a theory based on which phonologies are determined by phonetic principles.

== Reception ==
The book was reviewed by Keiichi Tajima, Jennifer L. Smith and Marc van Oostendorp.
