= Laboratory phonology =

Approach to phonology

Laboratory phonology is an approach to phonology that emphasizes the synergy between phonological theory and scientific experiments, including laboratory studies of human speech and experiments on the acquisition and productivity of phonological patterns. The central goal of laboratory phonology is "gaining an understanding of the relationship between the cognitive and physical aspects of human speech" through the use of an interdisciplinary approach that promotes scholarly exchange across disciplines, bridging linguistics with psychology, electrical engineering, computer science, and other fields. Although spoken speech has represented the major area of research, the investigation of sign languages and manual signs as encoding elements is also included in laboratory phonology. Important antecedents of the field include work by Kenneth N. Stevens and Gunnar Fant on the acoustic theory of speech production, Ilse Lehiste's work on prosody and intonation, and Peter Ladefoged's work on typological variation and methods for data capture. Current research in laboratory phonology draws heavily on the theories of metrical phonology and autosegmental phonology which are sought to be tested with help of experimental procedures, in laboratory settings, or through linguistic data collection at field sites, and through evaluation with statistical methods, such as exploratory data analysis.

Laboratory phonology is particularly connected with the Association for Laboratory Phonology, which was founded to promote the approach. In 2010, Laboratory Phonology - Journal of the Association for Laboratory Phonology was established as the journal of the association. Since 2016, it appears online in an open-access format. Among the researchers associated with laboratory phonology are Janet Pierrehumbert, Mary Beckman, Patricia Keating and D. Robert Ladd, who co-authored a paper discussing the approach. Other prominent laboratory phonologists include Catherine Browman, Jennifer S. Cole, Louis Goldstein, Julia Hirschberg, Ian Maddieson and Mariapaola D'Imperio.

== History ==
The term laboratory phonology was coined by Janet Pierrehumbert in the preparation phrase of the first biennial Conference on Laboratory Phonology (LabPhon), whose main goal was to connect the subfields of phonology with those of phonetics. Since then, the importance of LabPhon has increased significantly, as evidenced by the strong attendance at the biennial conferences.
