= Jerome Namias =

American meteorologist (1910–1997)

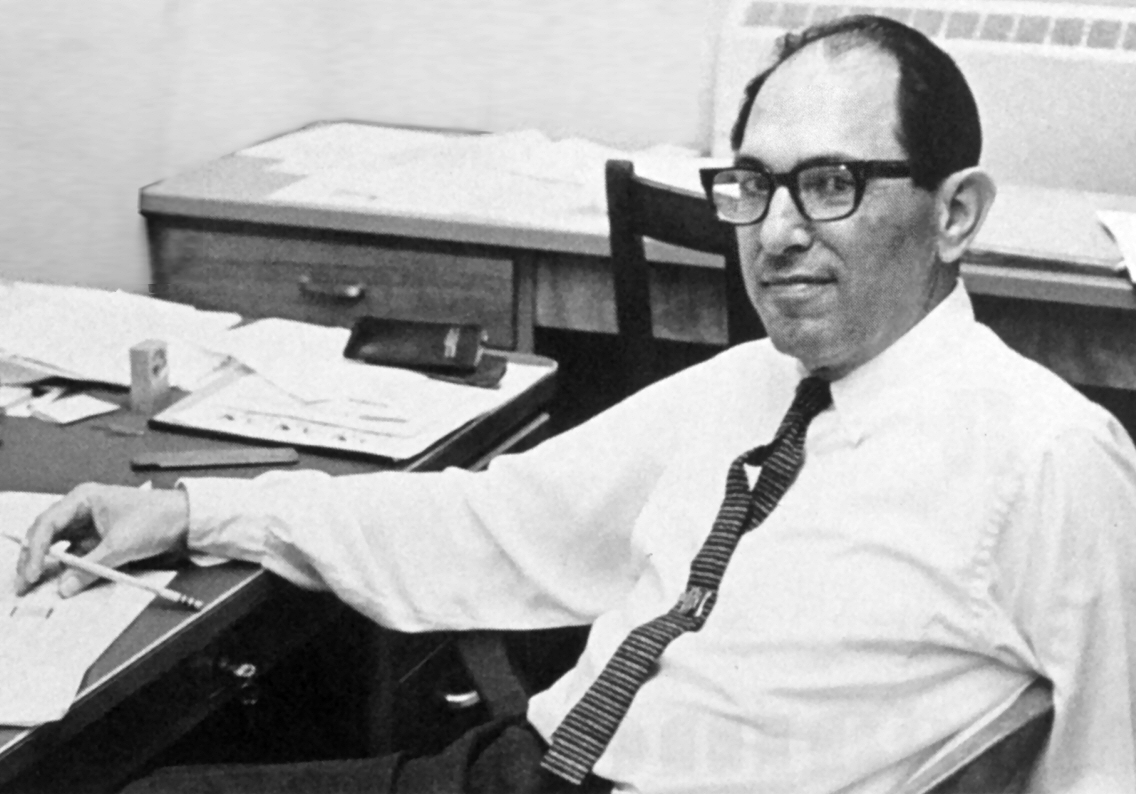
- "Jerome Namias, ESSA's top forecaster" (NOAA)
- Born: March 19, 1910; Bridgeport, Connecticut, US
- Died: February 10, 1997 (aged 86); San Diego, California, US
- Education: Massachusetts Institute of Technology
- Scientific career
- Fields: Meteorology
- Academic advisors: Hurd Curtis Willett

Jerome Namias (March 19, 1910 – February 10, 1997) was an American meteorologist, whose research included El Niño.

== Biography ==
Jerome "Jerry" Namias was born in Bridgeport, Connecticut, the second son of Joseph Namias, an optometrist, and Sadie Jacobs Namias. He was raised in Fall River, Massachusetts. On graduation from high school, Namias was offered a four-year scholarship to Wesleyan University in Connecticut; however, because of his father's illness and the Great Depression, Namias decided to stay home and try to find a job to help his family out." He took correspondence courses, which allowed him to obtain employment in meteorology-related areas. Later he studied at the University of Michigan for one year, then joined the Massachusetts Institute of Technology (MIT) in 1936 as research assistant. In the 1930s he studied the phenomena of the Dust Bowl. In 1941 he received his Master's degree from MIT.

From 1941 to 1971 he was Chief of the Extended Forecast Division of the U.S. Weather Bureau (now the National Weather Service). In the 1940s he developed the 5-day-forecast, and month and season forecasts in the 1960s. Further, he was responsible for forecasting for the Allies during World War II in Northern Africa.

Namias helped to develop the system of passenger flight weather forecasting, and researched the interaction between the oceans and atmosphere. He was involved in the research of the El Niño phenomena in the Pacific Ocean and its relevance to the world climate.

In 1971 he joined the Scripps Institution of Oceanography and established the first Experimental Climate Research Center. His prognosis of warm weather during the Arab oil embargo of 1973 greatly aided domestic policy response.

== Education ==
Namias attended public schools in Fall River, graduating from Durfee High School in 1928. He was offered a four-year scholarship to Wesleyan University, but due to the looming recession and his father's ill health, Jerome elected to remain home at that time. Shortly thereafter, he became infected with tuberculosis and was confined to his residence for several years. During that time he took several correspondence courses, including courses in meteorology, from Clark University. Although he never received an undergraduate degree, he eventually received a master's degree in Science from Massachusetts Institute of Technology (1941). He also later received honorary Ph.D.s from University of Rhode Island (1972) and from Clark University (1984).

While working at the National Weather Service in Washington, D.C., Namias entered into correspondence with the head of the newly established meteorology department at MIT, Carl-Gustaf Rossby. At Rossby's urging, Namias enrolled as an undergraduate student at MIT in 1932. However, in 1934 he left MIT to work in the nascent forecasting bureau of Trans-World Airlines in Newark and then in Kansas City, where he stayed until 1934. That job was canceled in 1934 when TWA lost a government airmail contract, and Namias "was happy to return to part-time work at MIT and Blue Hill Observatory, even though he had to learn to live on student pay once again."

In 1934 Namias had determined to obtain a college degree, and had enrolled in the University of Minnesota, which had lower tuition than MIT. However, he had serious health problems (pleural effusion) during that year, and he returned to Fall River, to continue his self-education. While in Fall River he published a seminal paper on atmospheric inversions (1936), which again impressed Dr Rossby, who offered Namias a graduate assistantship at MIT, beginning with the 1936 Fall term. He continued working and studying at MIT, receiving an M.S. degree in 1941.

The University of Rhode Island granted Namias an honorary D.Sc., in 1972; Clark University followed with a similar bestowal in 1984.

== Career in meteorology ==
After recovering from tuberculosis in the early 1930s, Namias sought employment in the field of meteorology. One petition, to H. H. Clayton at the Blue Hill Meteorological Observatory, resulted in a job offer. Namias was hired after a face-to-face interview which included an exercise in extracting predictions from meteorological data, and he was sent to the weather bureau in Washington, D.C. He was put to work compiling world weather records and solar weather studies.

In the NWS library, Namias discovered the scientific reports issued by Carl G. Rossby's new department of meteorology at MIT. He wrote Rossby, questioning some of the papers' assertions. Rossby, surprisingly, soon responded, acknowledging that part of Namias's assertions were indeed correct, and inviting Namias to come visit him.

Rossby had major influence on Namias. He arranged a job for Namias, taking and analyzing data from the research aircraft instruments used by the department at the East Boston Airport. Sometimes, Namias's work entailed fourteen-hour days, which included tracking balloon runs with the help of a theodolite to determine wind directions and speeds at various altitudes.

In 1934 Rossby suggested that Namias take a job in the rapidly expanding airline industry, with its desire to establish meteorological departments. He began working for Trans World Airlines, first at Newark and then at Kansas City, forecasting for transcontinental flights. However, TWA had to temporarily downsize after losing a lucrative government airmail contract, and Namias was unemployed. By this time he was known as an expert forecaster. He gave advice to Auguste Piccard in connection with Piccard's record-setting high-altitude balloon flights. He assisted helped out at the national gliding and soaring contest in New York, where Dupont made a distance record for the United States by using Namias's forecast of a strong frontal passage to glide all the way to Boston.

In 1936 Namias returned to work and study at MIT, working with and under Dr Rossby. Rossby had just begun working on his theory of long waves on the westerlies and was trying to convince people of its validity. One of the main difficulties in applying Rossby's ideas involved the lack of data aloft, particularly over the oceans. At Rossby's suggestion, Namias constructed a trial upper-level map by judicial extrapolations, estimating quantitatively the flow patterns aloft over the North Atlantic, as well as the United States. Namias was later one of the unnamed contributors to Rossby's 1939 seminal paper.

While at MIT, Namias was a proponent of isentropic analyses. A 1938 paper on the subject resulted in his receiving the first Clarence Leroy Meisinger Award of the American Meteorological Society in 1938. He was also part of an MIT team devoted to developing reliable methods for long-range weather forecasts (up to a week out). The group's work caught the attention of the US military as World War II began unfolding, and in 1941 Namias was asked to take a one-year leave of absence from MIT to head the forecasting effort in Washington, D.C.

The one-year leave of absence stretched on, while Namias supervised a seminal sea-level mapping effort, taught future military pilots and civilian forecasters at several training centers, and made extended predictions for several large-scale military offensives. He received a citation from Navy Secretary Frank Knox for his sea-state forecasts for the North African invasion. Namias also made forecasts for favorable periods for the transfer of disabled vessels to other ports for repair; estimates of the likely course of incendiary balloons from Japan; favorable and unfavorable conditions for the possible invasion of Japan; and certain aspects of the meteorology for bombing raids.

Dr Rossby returned to Sweden after the war to found the International Institute of Meteorology, and invited Namias to Stockholm. He used his time there to investigate variations in upper airflow patterns. He and colleague Phil Clapp issued a 1949 paper describing asymmetric variations in the upper-level winds, and in 1950 he issued a notable study of the index cycle.

By 1953 Namias felt enough confidence in his five-day prediction procedures to begin extending them to thirty days. He also began issuing advisory statements about hurricane probabilities a month in advance. This led to his receipt of the 1955 Award for Extraordinary Scientific Achievement, the highest accolade given by the American Meteorological Society.

In 1955 Namias also received the Rockefeller Public Service Award, which made it possible for him to spend a year studying at his choice of locale. He used this stipend to return to Stockholm. He documented his studies in papers explaining the influence of land and snow on atmospheric movements. A 1955 paper explored the possibility that the soil moisture in the Great Plains of the United States played an important role in the Great Plains drought by varying the heat input to the overlying atmosphere.

Namias was invited to speak at the 1957 Rancho Santa Fe CalCOFI (California Cooperative Fisheries) conference of Scripps Institution of Oceanography. He gave a standard talk about anomalous mid-altitude events, and then sat back to listen to the other speakers. A remarkable oceanic warming (now called El Niño) had recently occurred over the eastern Pacific. Southern fish were being caught in northern waters; unusual typhoons were observed; the atmosphere and ocean were not acting normally. This drastic switch in normally-observed weather caught Namias's attention, and he thereafter began to draw on the influence of the ocean surface in his weather studies. However, it was several years later before he could devote himself to unraveling the phenomenon. His mentor Rossby and his best friend and brother-in-law Harry Wexler were gone, both from heart failure, and he also had a heart attack in 1963. In 1964 he was involved in an automobile accident in Boston. Growing tired of all the budget battles, he submitted his retirement from the Weather Service in 1964.

Namias left NWS, but moved to Scripps to continue his investigations. In 1981 Namias received the Sverdrup Gold Medal of the American Meteorological Society for his pioneering efforts on air-sea interactions.

== Personal ==
Namias married Edith Paipert in 1938. They had one child, Judith. He was survived by his wife, daughter and grandchildren when he died in La Jolla, California, due to complications of a stroke which left him partially paralyzed and unable to speak or write (1989), and of pneumonia (1997).

During his long career, Namias never learned to drive a car. He was always driven by other workers, students or family members.

== Awards and honors ==
Namias received many honors and awards, including election into the National Academy of Sciences and the American Academy of Arts and Sciences. He won the Gold Medal of the U.S. Department of Commerce for distinguished achievement. He published more than 200 papers and worked in the field of meteorology until 1989. An endowed chair was established in his name at Scripps Institution of Oceanography to honor his legacy; the chair is currently held by Professor Ian Eisenman.

- 1938 Meisinger Award, American Meteorological Society
- 1943 Citation from Navy Secretary Frank Knox for weather forecasts in connection with the invasion of North Africa
- 1950 Meritorious Service Award, U.S. Department of Commerce
- 1955 Award for Extraordinary Scientific Accomplishment, American Meteorological Society
- 1955 Rockefeller Public Service Award
- 1965 Gold Medal Award, U.S. Department of Commerce
- 1972 Rossby fellow, Woods Hole Oceanographic Institution
- 1977 Visiting scholar, Rockefeller Study and Conference Center, Bellagio, Italy
- 1978 Headliner Award (Science), San Diego Press Club
- 1981 Sverdrup Gold Medal, American Meteorological Society
- 1984 Compass Distinguished Achievement Award, Marine Technology Society
- 1984 Associates Award for Research, University of California, San Diego
- 1985 Department of Commerce Certificate of Appreciation

== Societies ==
- American Academy of Arts and Sciences (fellow)
- American Association for the Advancement of Science (fellow)
- American Geophysical Union (fellow)
- American Meteorological Society (fellow), councilor 1940-42, 1950–53, 1960–63, and 1970–73
- Board of Editors, Geofísica Internacional, Mexico
- Explorers Club (fellow)
- Mexican Geophysical Union
- National Academy of Sciences
- National Weather Association
- Royal Meteorological Society of Great Britain
- Sigma Xi
- Washington Academy of Sciences (fellow)
