= Cynthia Clopper =

American linguist

Cynthia G. Clopper
- Board member of: President of the Association for Laboratory Phonology (2020–2022)

Academic background
- Education: Duke University (BA, 1999); Indiana University Bloomington (MA, 2001; PhD, 2004)
- Thesis: Linguistic Experience and the Perceptual Classification of Dialect Variation (2004)
- Doctoral advisor: David Pisoni; Kenneth J. de Jong

Academic work
- Discipline: Linguist
- Sub-discipline: Phonetics
- Main interests: Sociophonetics; prosody; speech perception
- Website: www.asc.ohio-state.edu/clopper.1/

Cynthia G. Clopper is an American linguist and professor in the linguistics department at Ohio State University. Clopper is known for her work on dialect perception, including cross-dialect lexical processing and regional prosodic variation in American English.

== Career ==
Clopper holds a Bachelor of Arts in Linguistics and Russian from Duke University. She received her PhD in 2004 from Indiana University Bloomington, with a dissertation titled Linguistic Experience and the Perceptual Classification of Dialect Variation. In 2013, she was named a Distinguished Young Alumni honoree by the Indiana University Linguistics Department.

Clopper currently serves as co-editor of the journal Language and Speech and has served as a member of the editorial board of the Journal of Phonetics and the Journal of the Acoustical Society of America. She is currently the president of the Association for Laboratory Phonology.
