= Metrical Stress Theory =

Book by Bruce Hayes

- Author: Bruce Hayes
- Language: English
- Subject: metrical phonology
- Publisher: University of Chicago Press
- Publication date: 1995
- Media type: Print (hardcover)

Metrical Stress Theory: Principles and Case Studies is a 1995 book by Bruce Hayes in which the author discusses metrical stress theory based on in-depth analyses of stress patterns of a large number of languages.

== Reception ==
The book was reviewed by Rene Kager, Omid Tabibzadeh and Shin-ichi Tanaka.
