= Mirjam Ernestus =

Dutch psycholinguist (born 1969)

Mirjam Theresia Constantia Ernestus (born 1969) is professor of psycholinguistics at Radboud University Nijmegen in the Netherlands.

== Biography ==
Ernestus studied at the Vrije Universiteit Amsterdam from 1987 to 2000, initially for a year in French linguistics and literature, then for a year in chemistry and pharmaceutical sciences, before graduating cum laude with a BA/MA in general linguistics in 1994. Her PhD was awarded in 2000.

Subsequently, Ernestus worked as a postdoctoral researcher at the Max Planck Institute for Psycholinguistics in Nijmegen from 2000 to 2006. In 2007 she was appointed associate professor of psycholinguistics at the Radboud University, and in 2012 she was promoted to full professor. From 2017 to 2022 she was also the scientific director of the university's Centre for Language Studies. In addition, she acted as editor of the journal Laboratory Phonology from 2015 to 2021, and since 2021 she has been chair of the editorial board of Radboud University Press.

Ernestus has been the recipient of significant honours and awards, including membership of the Royal Netherlands Academy of Arts and Sciences (since 2015) and the Academia Europaea (since 2022). In 2006 she was awarded a European Young Investigator Award for her project Acoustic Reduction in European languages, while in 2011 she was awarded an ERC Starting Grant with the title The challenge of reduced pronunciation variants in conversational speech for foreign language listeners: experimental research and computational modeling as well as a vici grant from the Dutch Research Council for the project Learning Pronunciation Variants for Words in a Foreign Language: Towards an Ecologically Valid Theory Based on Experimental Research and Computational Modelling. In 2022, she received a Radboud University medal, in recognition of her special contribution to Radboud University.

== Research ==
Ernestus's work is in the fields of laboratory phonology, psycholinguistics and phonetics, with the production and perception of informal, spontaneous conversational speech – including in second language acquisition – forming the main focus of her research. She also works on the processing of morphology. As part of her research projects, she has created several corpora of casual speech and experimental databases.

== Selected publications ==
- Ernestus, Mirjam. 2000. Voice assimilation and segment reduction in casual Dutch, a corpus-based study of the phonology-phonetics interface. Ph.D. dissertation, Vrije Universiteit Amsterdam. ISBN 9076864020
- Ernestus, Mirjam, R. Harald Baayen, and Rob Schreuder. 2002. The recognition of reduced word forms. Brain and Language 81 (1–3), 162–173. doi:10.1006/brln.2001.2514
- Ernestus, Mirjam, and R. Harald Baayen. 2003. Predicting the unpredictable: Interpreting neutralized segments in Dutch. Language 79 (1), 5–38. doi:10.1353/lan.2003.0076
- M. Ernestus, H. Kouwenhoven, & M. van Mulken (2017). The direct and indirect effects of the phonotactic constraints in the listener's native language on the comprehension of reduced and unreduced word pronunciation variants in a foreign language. Journal of Phonetics 62, 50-64. doi:10.1515/cllt-2013-0054
- L. ten Bosch, L. Boves, & M. Ernestus (2022). DIANA, a Process-Oriented Model of Human Auditory Word Recognition. Brain Sciences 12. doi:10.3390/brainsci12050681
