= Association for Laboratory Phonology =

- Formation: 1987
- Type: Nonprofit
- President: Mariapaola D'Imperio
- Key people: Cynthia Clopper (Vice-President)
- Website: labphon.org

The Association for Laboratory Phonology is a non-profit professional society for researchers interested in the sound structure of language. It was founded to promote the scientific study of all aspects of phonetics and phonology of oral and sign languages through scholarly exchange across disciplines and through the use of a hybrid methodology. The founding and honorary members are Amalia Arvaniti, Mary Beckman, Cathi Best, Catherine Browman, Jennifer S. Cole, Mariapaola D'Imperio, Louis M. Goldstein, José Ignacio Hualde, Patricia Keating, John Kingston, D.R. Ladd, Peter Ladefoged, Janet Pierrehumbert, Caroline Smith, Paul Warren, and Douglas Whalen. The Association is an international body open to scholars world-wide, and currently has over 100 members.

Since the Association's inception, the methodologies of laboratory phonology are emerging as the dominant approach to the study of sound systems in universities in North America, Europe, Australia, New Zealand, and many other locations. In this way, the success of the approach promoted by the Association for Laboratory Phonology can be attributed to its interdisciplinary nature: bridging linguistics with psychology, computer science, etc., and defining the relationship between the cognitive and physical aspects of human speech as a question of cognitive science.

== Meetings ==
LabPhon
- Genre: Laboratory phonology conference
- Frequency: Biennually
- Inaugurated: 1987
- Most recent: 2026

The biennial Conference on Laboratory Phonology (LabPhon) brings together researchers across the many relevant disciplines to present work on the phonological patterns and structures of natural languages. All oral paper sessions are plenary, and are organized to promote discussion across the disciplines. Each session groups together invited and submitted talks on a conference theme and ends with a talk by an invited discussant followed by an open discussion by the entire conference audience. Since the second conference in 1989, there have also been one or more poster sessions, which also are plenary. Conferences generally have between four and six themes, which are broadly defined in order to bring together speakers and commentators from different disciplines and theoretical backgrounds.

=== Past Conferences ===
- LabPhon 20: 2026 - Montreal, Canada - "Looking Back & Looking Forward"
- LabPhon 19: 2024 - Seoul, South Korea - "Where Speech Sounds Meet the Architecture of the Grammar and Beyond"
- LabPhon 18: 2022 - Virtual - "Change"
- LabPhon 17: 2020 - Virtual - "Laboratory Phonology on the Margins"
- LabPhon 16: 2018 - Lisbon, Portugal - "Variation, Development and Impairment: Between Phonetics and Phonology"
- LabPhon 15: 2016 - Ithaca, USA - "Speech Dynamics and Phonological Representation"
- LabPhon 14: 2014 - Tokyo, Japan - "Laboratory Phonology beyond the Laboratory: Quantitative Analyses of Speech Produced outside the Phonetics Laboratory"
- LabPhon 13: 2012 - Stuttgart, Germany - "Phonological and Phonetic Computations: Between Grammar and Neural Activity"
- LabPhon 12: 2010 - Albuquerque, USA - "Gesture as Language, Gesture and Language"
- LabPhon 11: 2008 - Wellington, New Zealand - "Phonetic Detail in the Lexicon"
- LabPhon 10: 2006 - Paris, France - "Variation, Detail, and Representation"
- LabPhon 9: 2004 - Urbana, USA - "Change in Phonology"
- LabPhon 8: 2002 - New Haven, USA - "Varieties of Phonological Competence"
- LabPhon 7: 2000 - Nijmegen, Netherlands - "Phonological Processing & Encoding: Relating Phonetics and Phonology"
- LabPhon 6: 1998 - York, UK
- LabPhon 5: 1996 - Evanston, USA - "Acquisition and Lexical Representation"
- LabPhon 4: 1993 - Oxford, UK
- LabPhon 3: 1991 - Los Angeles, USA
- LabPhon 2: 1989 - Edinburgh, UK
- LabPhon 1: 1987 - Columbus, USA

== Publications ==
The proceedings of the Conference on Laboratory Phonology were published as Papers in Laboratory Phonology by Cambridge University Press from 1991 (Vol 1) to 2004 (Vol 6). Beginning with Vol 7, the series was renamed to Laboratory Phonology and published by Mouton de Gruyter. After the publication of Laboratory Phonology 10 in 2010, the book series was replaced by the journal Laboratory Phonology. The first six volumes of the journal were published by Mouton de Gruyter, and then starting with volume 7 in 2016, the journal moved to Ubiquity Press, to become an online-only, open-access publication. The journal encompasses the scientific study of the elements of oral language, their organization, their grammatical function, and their role in speech communication. Research questions and some of the methods addressed in the publications also extend naturally to the parallel investigation of manual signs as the encoding elements of sign languages.

=== Proceedings ===
- Papers in Laboratory Phonology Volume I: Between the Grammar and Physics of Speech
- Papers in Laboratory Phonology Volume II: Gesture, Segment, Prosody
- Papers in Laboratory Phonology Volume III: Phonological Structure and Phonetic Form
- Papers in Laboratory Phonology Volume IV: Phonology and Phonetic Evidence
- Papers in Laboratory Phonology Volume V: Acquisition and the Lexicon
- Papers in Laboratory Phonology Volume VI: Phonetic Interpretation
- Laboratory Phonology 7
- Laboratory Phonology 8
- Laboratory Phonology 9
- Laboratory Phonology 10

== Executive Council ==
- Mariapaola D'Imperio, president (2018-2020)
- Cynthia Clopper, vice-president (2018-2020)
- Lisa Davidson, secretary (2016-2020)
- Jeff Mielke, treasurer (2018-2022)
- Mirjam Ernestus, ditor-in-chief of laboratory phonology (2018-2021)
- Molly Babel, organizing committee LabPhon 17 (2018-2022)
- Sónia Frota, organizing committee LabPhon 16 (2016-2020)
- Sasha Calhoun, councilor-at-large (2018-2022)
- Alexei Kochetov, councilor-at-large (2016-2020)
- Janet Fletcher, councilor-at-large (2016-2020)
- Stefanie Shattuck-Hufnagel, councilor-at-large (2016-2020)

== See also ==
- Laboratory phonology
