= Raymond Pierrehumbert =

American geophysicist

Raymond Pierrehumbert FRS
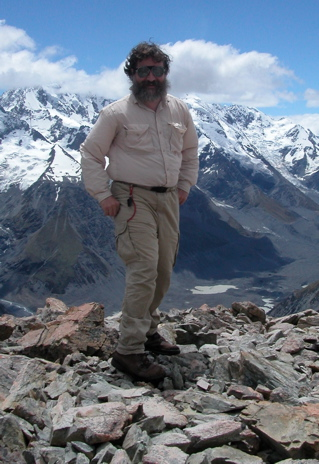
- Born: Raymond Thomas Pierrehumbert
- Education: Harvard University; Massachusetts Institute of Technology
- Spouse: Janet Pierrehumbert
- Awards: Fellow of the AAAS, Ordre des Palmes académiques, Guggenheim Fellowship, Fellow of the Royal Society
- Scientific career
- Fields: Geophysics, climatology
- Workplaces: University of Chicago; University of Oxford
- Thesis: The structure and stability of large vortices in an inviscid flow (1980)
- Notable students: Joshua Wurman

Raymond Thomas Pierrehumbert FRS is the Halley professor of physics at the University of Oxford. Previously, he was Louis Block professor in geophysical sciences at the University of Chicago. He was a lead author on the Third Assessment Report of the IPCC (Intergovernmental Panel on Climate Change) and a co-author of the National Research Council report on abrupt climate change.

== Education and awards ==
He earned a degree in physics (A.B) from Harvard College and a Ph.D. in aeronautics and astronautics from the Massachusetts Institute of Technology.

He was awarded a John Simon Guggenheim Fellowship in 1996, which was used to launch collaborative work on the climate of early Mars with collaborators in Paris. He is a Fellow of the American Geophysical Union (AGU) and has been named Chevalier de l'Ordre des Palmes Académiques by the Republic of France. He was elected to the American Academy of Arts and Sciences in 2015 and sits on the Science and Security Board of the Bulletin of the Atomic Scientists. In 2020, Pierrehumbert was elected a Fellow of the Royal Society.

== Research ==
Pierrehumbert's central research interest is how climate works as a system and developing idealized mathematical models to be used to address questions of climate science such as how the earth kept from freezing over: the faint young sun paradox.

Pierrehumbert contributes to RealClimate and is a strong critic of solar geoengineering research.

He also is very active in the study of the climate of exoplanets.

== Personal life ==
Pierrehumbert is married to Janet Pierrehumbert, professor of Language Modeling at the University of Oxford.

== Selected papers ==
- Pierrehumbert R.T. 2002: "The Hydrologic Cycle in Deep Time Climate Problems ", Nature, 419, 191–198.
- Pierrehumbert R.T. 2003: "Counting the Cost", Nature, 422 (6929), 263.
- Goodman, J.C. and R.T. Pierrehumbert 2003: "Glacial flow of floating marine ice in Snowball Earth", J. Geophys. Res., 108 (C10), 3308, doi:10.1029/2002JC001471.
- Alley R.B., J. Marotzke, W.D. Nordhaus, J.T. Overpeck, D.M. Peteet, R.A. Pielke Jr., R.T. Pierrehumbert, P.B. Rhines, T.F. Stocker, L. Talley and J.M. Wallace, 2003: "Abrupt Climate Change", Science, 299, 2005–2010.
- Pierrehumbert, R.T. 2004: "High levels of atmospheric carbon dioxide necessary for the termination of global glaciation", Nature, 429, 646–649.
- Pierrehumbert, R.T. 2004: "Warming the world: Greenhouse effect: Fourier’s concept of planetary energy balance is still relevant today". Nature, 432, 677.
- Pierrehumbert, R.T. 2005: "Climate dynamics of a hard snowball Earth", J. Geophys. Res., 110 (D01111), doi:10.1029/2004JD005162.
