= Dorie Clark =

American author and professor

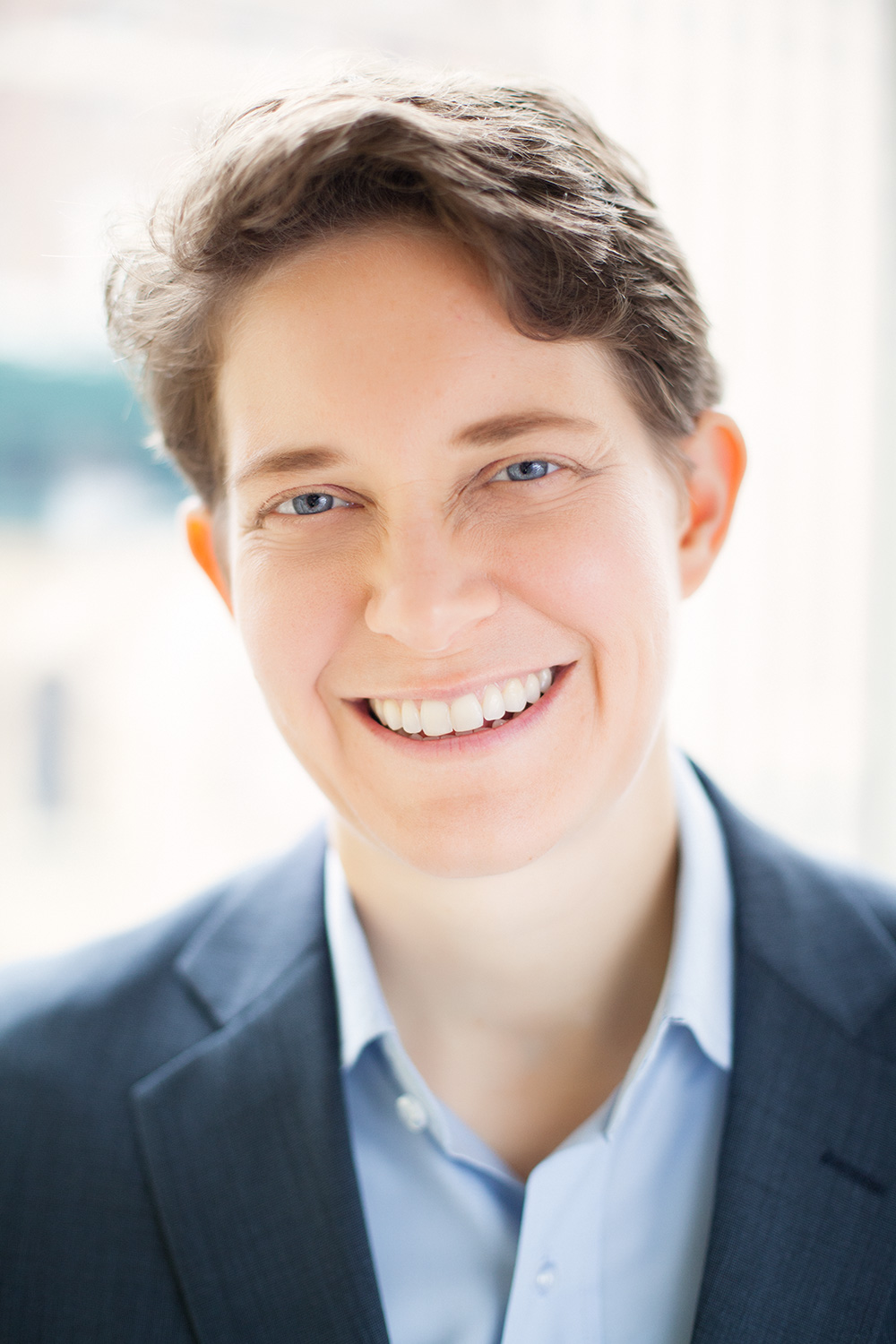
- Clark in 2017
- Born: Pinehurst, North Carolina, USA
- Occupations: Professor, Author, Consultant
- Employer: Duke University

Dorie Clark (born 1978) is an American author and executive education professor at Columbia University’s Columbia Business School.

== Personal life ==
Clark was born in Pinehurst, North Carolina and left high school at age 14 to attend the Program for the Exceptionally Gifted at Mary Baldwin College (now University) in Staunton, Virginia.

Clark transferred to Smith College in Northampton, Massachusetts, where she graduated magna cum laude in 1997 with a BA in Philosophy. She was inducted into the Phi Beta Kappa honor society. In 1999, she completed her Master of Theological Studies at Harvard Divinity School.

In 2024, Clark married Alexis Redding, a developmental psychologist who teaches at Harvard University.

== Career ==
Clark has guest lectured and taught at universities around the world, including Harvard University in Cambridge, Massachusetts; IE Business School in Madrid, Spain; and the Moscow School of Management SKOLKOVO in Moscow, Russia. She has also spoken at the U.S. Library of Congress.

Clark has been described by the New York Times as an “expert at self-reinvention and helping others make changes in their lives.” She is a frequent contributor to the Harvard Business Review, Fast Company, and Business Insider. She hosts “Better,” a weekly video interview program, for Newsweek.

She started her career as a journalist at the alternative newsweekly The Boston Phoenix.

She became the press secretary for former U.S. Labor Secretary Robert Reich’s unsuccessful 2002 campaign for Massachusetts governor. She later became the New Hampshire Communication Director for Howard Dean’s 2004 presidential campaign.

== Books ==
- Reinventing You: Define Your Brand, Imagine Your Future (Harvard Business Review Press, 2013)
- Stand Out: How to Find Your Breakthrough Idea and Build a Following Around It (Portfolio/Penguin, 2015)
- Entrepreneurial You: Monetize Your Expertise, Create Multiple Income Streams, and Thrive (Harvard Business Review Press, 2017)
- The Long Game: How to Be a Long-Term Thinker in a Short-Term World (Harvard Business Review Press, 2021)
