= A Critical Introduction to Phonology =

Book by Daniel Silverman

A Critical Introduction to Phonology: Functional and Usage-Based Perspectives
- Author: Daniel Silverman
- Language: English
- Subject: phonology
- Publisher: Continuum International Publishing Group
- Publication date: 2006 (1st ed), 2017 (2nd ed)
- Media type: Print (hardcover)
- Pages: 260
- ISBN: 9781474238892

A Critical Introduction to Phonology: Functional and Usage-Based Perspectives is a 2006 book by Daniel Silverman designed for an introductory course in phonology.

== Reception ==
The book was reviewed by Marc Pierce, Stephanie Clair, Ewan Dunbar and William J. Idsardi.
