= Douglas Whalen =

American linguist

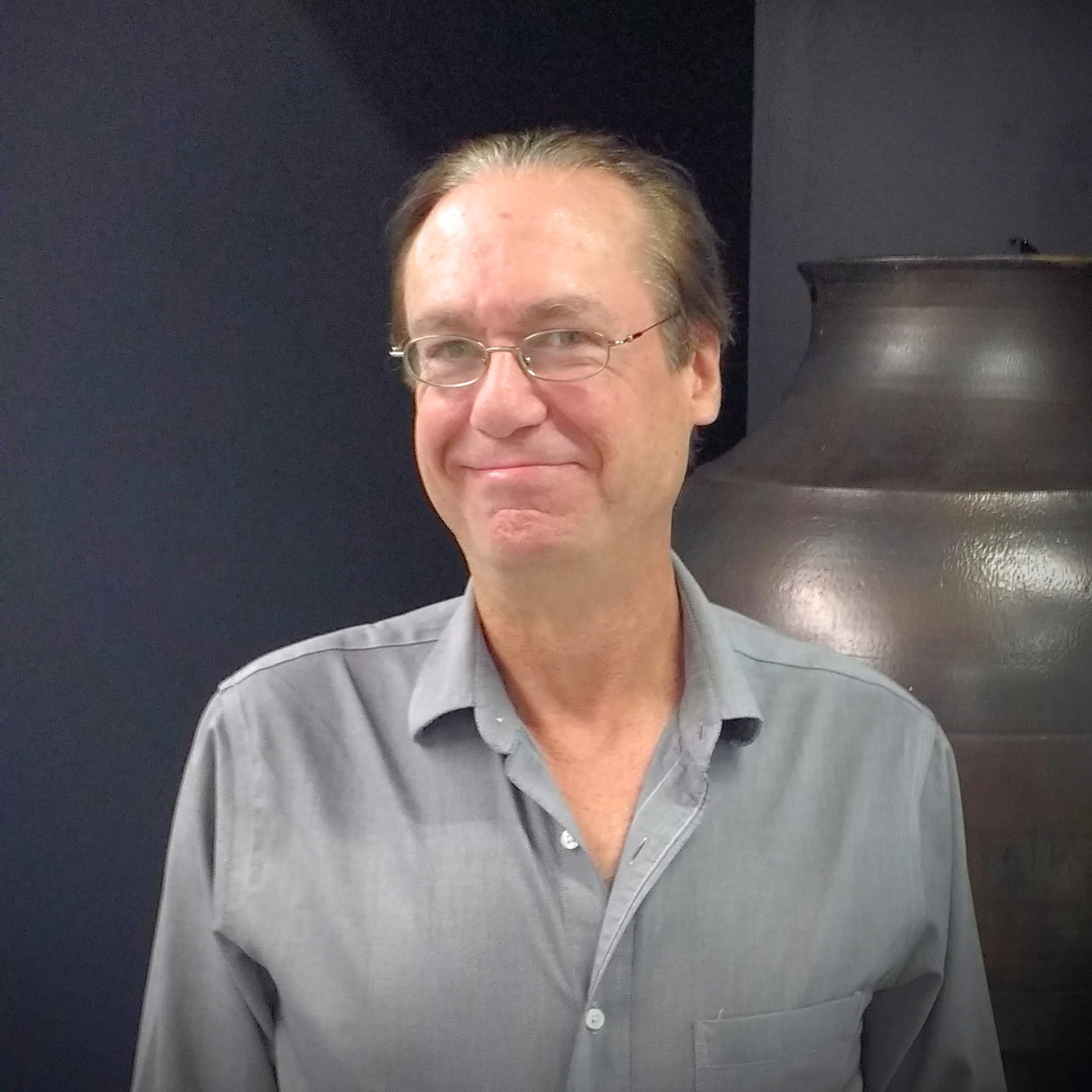
- Scientific career
- Fields: Linguistics

Douglas H. Whalen is an American linguist. He received his Ph.D. in linguistics from Yale University in 1982 as a student of Louis M. Goldstein. Since 2011 he has been a Distinguished Professor in the Speech-Language-Hearing Sciences program at the CUNY Graduate Center. He is a long-standing member of Haskins Laboratories in New Haven Connecticut, where he is a Senior Scientist and Vice President for Research. Whalen studies the relationship between speech production and speech perception from the perspective of the motor theory of speech perception.

Whalen is the founder of the Endangered Language Fund, and served as its president until 2015, when he became chair of the board of directors. He is also a founding member of the Association for Laboratory Phonology and on the advisory board for Healing Through Language, an organization that researches the connection between indigenous language revitalization and physical well-being. From 2006 through 2008, he served as a program officer at the National Science Foundation where he was affiliated with the Cognitive Neuroscience, Documenting Endangered Languages, and Linguistics programs.
