= Kristine Hildebrandt =

American linguist

- Education: University of California, Santa Barbara (Ph.D. in Linguistics)
- Occupation: linguist
- Employer(s): Southern Illinois University Edwardsville, Professor of English Language and Literature
- Known for: research into Tibeto-Burman languages and languages of the Himalayas.
- Notable work: Editor, Himalayan Linguistics; President, Endangered Language Fund (ELF)

Kristine Hildebrandt is an American linguist who is known for her research into Tibeto-Burman languages and languages of the Himalayas. Her work focuses on the Nar-Phu and Gurung languages and other languages of the Manang District of Nepal, with expertise in phonetics.

Hildebrandt earned her Ph.D. in Linguistics in 2003 from the University of California, Santa Barbara. She is a Professor of English Language and Literature, and the Co-Director of the Interdisciplinary Research and Informatics Scholarship Center at the Southern Illinois University Edwardsville. Hildebrandt was the editor of the open-access, peer-reviewed journal Himalayan Linguistics, between 2024 and 2022. She served as the President of the Endangered Language Fund (ELF) until December 2024.

== Awards and distinctions ==
- Former editor of the open-access, peer-reviewed journal Himalayan Linguistics
- Former president of the Endangered Language Fund (ELF)
- 2014 Chair of the Linguistics Society of America The Committee on Endangered Languages and Their Preservation

== Publications ==
- 2025. Hildebrandt, K.A. A Grammar of Gurung. De Gruyter Mouton.
- 2022. Hildebrandt, K.A., O. Bond, & D.N. Dhakal. A micro-typology of contact effects in four Tibeto-Burman languages. Journal of Language Contact, 15(2), 302-340.
- 2021. Childs, Geoff, Craig, S., Juenger, C., & Hildebrandt, K.A.. This is the end: Earthquake narratives and Buddhist prophesies of decline. Himalaya, 40(2), 32-49.
- 2020. Genetti, C., Hildebrandt, K.A., Sims, N., & Fawcett, A. Direction and associated motion in Tibeto-Burman. Linguistic Typology, 25(2), 345-388.
- 2020. Gawne, L. & Hildebrandt, K.A. Reported speech in earthquake narratives from six Tibeto-Burman languages. Studies in Language, 44(2), 461-499.
- 2019. Hildebrandt, K.A., Burge-Beckley, T. & Sebok, J. Language documentation in the aftermath of the 2015 Nepal Earthquakes: A guide to two archives and a web exhibit. Language Documentation & Conservation, 13, 618-651.
- 2018. Hildebrandt, K.A. Teaching about endangered languages in the undergraduate curriculum. Language & Linguistics Compass, 12.7.
- 2018. Childs, G., Craig, S., Donohue, M., Dhakal, D.N., Gautam, B.R., & Hildebrandt, K.A. Narrating disaster through participatory research after the 2015 earthquakes in Nepal. Collaborative Anthropologies, 10(1-2), 207-236.
- 2018. Hildebrandt, K.A., Bond, O., & Dhakal, D.N. Kinship in three Tamangic varieties. Linguistics of the Tibeto-Burman Area, 41, 1-21.
- 2010. Schiering, R., Bickel, B., & Hildebrandt, K. A. The prosodic word is not universal, but emergent. Journal of Linguistics, 46(3), 657–709.
- 2004. Hildebrandt, K.A. A grammar and glossary of the Manange language. In C. Genetti (ed.), Tibeto-Burman Languages of Nepal: Manange and Sherpa, 241, 1-192. Canberra: Pacific Linguistics.
- 2004. Hildebrandt, K.A. Manange tone: Scenarios of retention and loss in two communities (Nepal). PhD Dissertation. University of California, Santa Barbara.
- 2004. Genetti, C., & Hildebrandt, K. The two adjective classes in Manange. Adjective Classes: A cross-linguistic typology, 1, 74.
