= Acoustic and Auditory Phonetics =

Book by Keith Allan Johnson

- Author: Keith Allan Johnson
- Language: English
- Subject: phonetics
- Publisher: Wiley-Blackwell
- Publication date: 1997 (1st ed), 2003 (2nd ed), 2011 (3rd ed)
- Media type: Print (hardcover)
- Pages: 232
- ISBN: 978-1-4051-9466-2

Acoustic and Auditory Phonetics is a textbook by Keith Allan Johnson designed for an introductory course in phonetics.

== Reception ==
The book was reviewed by Rungpat Roengpitya, Hans Grassegger and David M. Howard.
