= Ian Maddieson =

British-American linguist (1942–2025)

- Born: 1 September 1942; Watford, Hertfordshire, England
- Died: 2 February 2025 (aged 82); Albuquerque, New Mexico, U.S.
- Education: Oxford University (BA), University of London (MA) University of California, Los Angeles (PhD)
- Known for: Phonetics, Phonological Typology
- Spouse: Caroline Smith
- Scientific career
- Fields: Phonetics; phonology; linguistic typology
- Institutions: University of California at Berkeley, University of New Mexico, Santa Fe Institute
- Website: Official website

Ian Maddieson (1 September 1942 – 2 February 2025) was a British-American linguist. He was best known for his work in phonetics and phonological typology.

== Life and career ==
Maddieson was born in Watford, England, on 1 September 1942. After receiving a M.A. degree from SOAS, he taught for four years (1968-1971) at the University of Ibadan in Nigeria before taking a one-year position at Indiana University. Research positions on projects at UCLA and Stanford followed. He completed a Ph.D. in linguistics at UCLA in 1977, with a dissertation entitled Universals of Tone: Six Studies. He remained at UCLA as adjunct faculty in phonetics until the end of 1999, doing research and occasionally teaching. He then moved to the University of California, Berkeley, where he remained until retiring and moving to Albuquerque in 2006.

He was a prolific field phonetician. His pioneering and widely cited books, Patterns of Sounds and The Sounds of the World's Languages (with Peter Ladefoged), helped define the fields of contemporary linguistic phonetics and phonological typology. He contributed to a number of online typological databases. For example, he wrote several chapters of WALS, and he worked with researchers at the Laboratoire Dynamique du Langage in Lyon, France, to develop an online database of the sounds of languages around the world, intended to update UPSID.

Maddieson died on 2 February 2025, in Albuquerque, New Mexico, at the age of 82.

== Honors ==
He served as Vice-President of the International Phonetic Association (IPA) from 2003-2007, among other services to the IPA, including acting for many years as editor-in-chief of their flagship publication, the Journal of the IPA. He was a founding member of the Association for Laboratory Phonology and served as the first Secretary of the association from 2010-2012.

A Festschrift in his honor entitled Remembering Ian Maddieson was edited by Keith Johnson after his death.

== Books ==
- Ladefoged, Peter; Maddieson, Ian (1996). The Sounds of the World's Languages. Oxford: Blackwell. ISBN 0-631-19815-6.
  - Describes known contrasting phonetic categories and ways in which phonemic sounds differ across human language, based on data from approximately 400 languages.
- Maddieson, Ian (1984). Patterns of Sounds. Cambridge: Cambridge University Press. ISBN 0-521-26536-3. Republished 2009, ISBN 978-0-521-11326-7.
  - Analyzes the frequencies and distributions of the phonemic sounds among languages. The results are based on UPSID (the UCLA Phonological Segment Inventory Database).
