= Ian Eisenman =

American climate scientist

- Born: United States
- Education: Williams College, UC Santa Barbara, Harvard University
- Awards: AGU Cryosphere Young Investigator Award (2012), Hellman Fellowship (2016)
- Scientific career
- Fields: Climate Science, Cryospheric Processes, Physical Oceanography
- Workplaces: Scripps Institution of Oceanography, University of California, San Diego
- Website: https://eisenman.ucsd.edu/

Ian Eisenman is an American climate scientist and physical oceanographer known for his research on cryospheric processes and their impact on global climate dynamics, as well as physical oceanography, climate feedbacks, and paleoclimatology. He is a professor at the Scripps Institution of Oceanography at the University of California, San Diego and the inaugural holder of the Jerome Namias Chair in Climate Studies. In 2012, Eisenman was awarded the AGU Cryosphere Young Investigator Award for his pioneering contributions to cryospheric science. In 2016, he was awarded a Hellman Fellowship to investigate mechanisms for polar sea ice changes.

== Academic career ==
Eisenman received a bachelor's degree in philosophy and physics from Williams College, a master's degree in physics from the University of California, Santa Barbara, and both a master's degree in applied mathematics and a PhD in earth and planetary sciences from Harvard University. During his doctoral studies, he was awarded a NASA Earth System Science Graduate Student Fellowship. After completing his PhD, Eisenman held a joint postdoctoral appointment at the California Institute of Technology (Caltech) and the University of Washington. His postdoctoral research was supported by a NOAA Climate and Global Change Postdoctoral Fellowship, as well as a Prize Postdoctoral Fellowship through Caltech's Division of Geological and Planetary Sciences.

He subsequently joined the faculty at the Scripps Institution of Oceanography, where his laboratory investigates the fundamental dynamics of the Earth's climate system, with a particular emphasis on paleoclimatology, polar sea ice, iceberg trajectories, and the broader atmospheric and oceanic circulation patterns. His methodological approach bridges theory and observation, utilizing empirical data in conjunction with a wide spectrum of models. These tools span from conceptual, mathematically derived pencil-and-paper models to highly sophisticated global climate simulations executed on supercomputers. A unifying objective of his academic work is to leverage applied mathematics and physical modeling to answer complex, societally relevant environmental challenges.

== Research contributions ==
Eisenman's research has advanced scientific understanding across several interconnected areas of ocean and climate dynamics:

- Arctic Sea Ice and Albedo Feedback: Utilizing satellite data to directly quantify the decrease in planetary albedo resulting from retreating Arctic sea ice. His research highlighted that this darkening of the Arctic has caused radiative heating equivalent to roughly 25% of the direct global warming from carbon dioxide emissions over the same period.
- Tipping Points and Ice-Thickness Feedbacks: Examining the hypothesis of an imminent, irreversible "tipping point" for Arctic summer sea ice. His modeling work demonstrated that a poorly understood "ice-thickness feedback"—where thinner ice grows back significantly faster in the winter—strongly counteracts the ice-albedo feedback, suggesting that a sudden, discontinuous jump to an ice-free Arctic is unlikely.
- Drift Dynamics of Floating Objects: Developing theories and analytical models regarding the drift of icebergs and other flotsam in the ocean. His research established that remarkably diverse floating objects (including icebergs, sea ice floes, and cargo containers) consistently move at approximately 2–4% of the prevailing wind velocity relative to the water, regardless of their size or shape.
- Sea Level Rise and Meltwater Injection: Investigating the regional patterns of sea level rise and ocean adjustment, particularly focusing on how the precise depth at which Antarctic meltwater fluxes enter the ocean influences the spatial patterns of sea level changes over time.
- Sea Ice Seasonal Asymmetry: Identifying and modeling the asymmetric nature of polar sea ice seasons. His research has documented how the period of sea ice retreat (melting) in both the Antarctic and the Arctic is notably shorter than the period of ice advance (freezing), a dynamic he has traced across both satellite observations and comprehensive climate models.
- Equilibrium Climate Sensitivity and Radiative Feedbacks: Simulating a continuum of climates—ranging from a nearly ice-covered "Snowball Earth" to an ice-free hothouse—to understand how climate feedbacks vary with the climate state itself. This recent research demonstrated that the pre-industrial climate is near a "stability optimum" and suggested a reduction in the uncertainty range for modern equilibrium climate sensitivity by better constraining how paleoclimate records are interpreted.
- Refining Climate Model Methodologies: Identifying and mitigating spurious climate impacts in coupled sea ice loss simulations. By critically evaluating how current state-of-the-art models artificially perturb sea ice, his work helps refine the accuracy of projected hydrological and atmospheric changes resulting from future warming.
- Climate Model Accuracy and Biases: Demonstrating that comprehensive climate models often accurately simulate the rapid observed retreat of Arctic sea ice only when they concurrently simulate excessive global warming, suggesting that many models reproduce correct sea ice trends for the wrong physical reasons.
- Sea Ice Stability and Model Complexity: Reconciling discrepancies between simple idealized models, which often predict abrupt "tipping points," and complex global models. This work showed that adding meridional heat transport and seasonal solar forcing to idealized models vastly increases sea ice stability and diminishes the likelihood of sudden tipping points.
- Geographic Limits on Arctic Sea Ice: Highlighting that Northern Hemisphere landmasses naturally limit winter Arctic sea ice expansion. When sea ice retreat is measured by average latitude rather than total area to account for this "geographic muting," the underlying rates of winter and summer sea ice loss in recent decades are strikingly similar.
- Paleoclimate and Ice Sheet Dynamics: Proposing a novel mechanism for historical abrupt climate shifts like the Younger Dryas. This research suggested that receding ice sheets triggered increased rainfall, providing a massive influx of freshwater capable of disrupting the thermohaline circulation and driving global climate changes.
- Ocean Heat Flux and Polar Amplification: Identifying a localized oceanic mechanism contributing to polar amplification. This study showed that as the global ocean warms, increased vertical temperature gradients across the halocline beneath the sea ice drive greater horizontal ocean heat transport into the Arctic, accelerating local warming.

== Awards and honors ==
- AGU Cryosphere Young Investigator Award (2012) – Awarded by the American Geophysical Union in recognition of Eisenman's pioneering research on cryospheric dynamics and its implications for global climate change.
- Hellman Fellowship (2016) – An endowed program at the University of California campuses awarding assistant professors who have ability for great distinction in their fields.
