= Introductory Phonology =

Book by Bruce Hayes

- Author: Bruce Hayes
- Language: English
- Subject: phonology
- Publisher: Wiley-Blackwell
- Publication date: 2008
- Media type: Print (hardcover)
- Pages: 336
- ISBN: 978-1-4443-6013-4

Introductory Phonology is a 2008 book by Bruce Hayes designed for an introductory course in phonology for undergraduates.

== Reception ==
The book was reviewed by Eric Bakovic, Samuil Marusca, Lilla Magyar and Maria Gouskova.
