= Keith Johnson (phonetician) =

American linguist (born 1958)

Keith Allan Johnson
- Born: August 14, 1958 (age 68)

Academic background
- Education: Ohio State University (PhD), Abilene Christian University (BA)
- Thesis: Processes of speaker normalization in vowel perception (1988)
- Doctoral advisor: Mary E. Beckman
- Other advisors: Ilse Lehiste, Robert Allen Fox, Neal F. Johnson

Academic work
- Discipline: linguistics
- Sub-discipline: phonetics
- Institutions: University of California, Berkeley, Ohio State University (1993-2005)
- Doctoral students: Mariapaola D'Imperio

Keith Allan Johnson (born August 14, 1958) is an American linguist and Professor Emeritus of Linguistics at the University of California, Berkeley. He graduated from Norman High in 1976, before getting his B.A. in Religion from Abilene Christian University. In 1998, he completed his PhD in the Department of Linguistics at Ohio State University, where he later taught from 1993 to 2005. He is best known for his works on phonetics with about 20 thousand citations on Google Scholar.

== Books ==
- Peter Ladefoged & Keith Johnson. (2015) A Course in Phonetics, 7th Edition. Cengage.
- Keith Johnson (2011) Acoustic and Auditory Phonetics, 3rd edition.. Wiley-Blackwell
- Keith Johnson (2008) Quantitative Methods in Linguistics. Wiley-Blackwell
- Elizabeth Hume & Keith Johnson (Eds.) (2001) The Role of Speech Perception in Phonology. Academic Press.
- Keith Johnson & John Mullennix (Eds.) Talker Variability in Speech Processing. Academic Press.
