= Language and Speech =

- Discipline: Linguistics
- Language: English
- Edited by: Cynthia Clopper, Holger Mitterer

Publication details
- History: 1958-present
- Publisher: Sage Publications
- Frequency: Quarterly
- Impact factor: 1.471 (2016)

Standard abbreviations
- ISO 4: Lang. Speech

Indexing
- ISSN: 0023-8309 (print); 1756-6053 (web)
- LCCN: 59051327
- OCLC no.: 610396653

Links
- Journal homepage; Online access; Online archive

Language and Speech is a peer-reviewed academic journal that publishes papers in the fields of linguistics, experimental psychology, audiology and speech-language pathology. The journal's editors are Cynthia Clopper (Ohio State University) and Holger Mitterer (University of Malta). It has been in publication since 1958. It was first published by Kingston Press Services, and Sage Publications has been the publisher since 2008.

== Scope ==
Language and Speech provides an international forum for communication among researchers in the disciplines that contribute to the understanding of speech and language. The journal publishes reports of original and interdisciplinary research. Language and Speech focuses on Corpus-based, experimental, and observational research, regarding spoken or written language within the domain of linguistic, psychological, or computational models.

== History ==
Dennis Butler Fry (1907–1983), Professor of Experimental Phonetics University College London (Head of Department 1958–1971), was the founding editor of L&S in 1958. The Oct–Dec 1978 issue comprises essays in his honor and includes a list of his publications.

== Editors ==
- Dennis Butler Fry (University College London)
- Bruno Repp (Haskins Laboratories)
- D Robert Ladd & Ellen G Bard (University of Edinburgh)
- Irene Vogel & Tim Bunnell (University of Delaware) (2000–2012)
- Michael Vitevitch & Joan Sereno (University of Kansas) (2013–2017)
- Cynthia Clopper & Holger Mitterer (2017–present)

== Abstracting and indexing ==
Language And Speech is abstracted and indexed in, among other databases: SCOPUS, and the Social Sciences Citation Index. According to the Journal Citation Reports, its 2016 impact factor is 1.471, ranking it 14/25 in Audiology & Speech-Language Pathology.
