= A Course in Phonetics =

Book by Peter Ladefoged and Keith Allan Johnson

- Author: Peter Ladefoged, Keith Allan Johnson
- Language: English
- Subject: phonetics
- Publisher: Harcourt Brace Jovanovich, Cengage Learning
- Publication date: 1975 (1st ed), 2015 (7th ed)
- Media type: Print (hardcover)
- ISBN: 9781285463407

A Course in Phonetics is a textbook by Peter Ladefoged and Keith Allan Johnson designed for an introductory course in phonetics.

== Reception ==
The book was reviewed by Laurie Bauer, J. C. Wells, Timothy Riney, Lisa Davidson, Douglas Pulleyblank, Julia Roberts and Dwan Shipley.
