= Alexis Redding =

American author and professor

- Occupation: Professor

Alexis Redding is a developmental psychologist and lecturer at the Harvard Graduate School of Education (HGSE), where she serves as the Faculty Co-Chair of the Higher Education Concentration. Her work focuses on supporting young adults during their college years and the transition to the workforce, integrating psychology, education, and ethnography to capture the nuances of young adult development.

== Personal life ==
Redding earned her A.B. from Harvard College, followed by an Ed.M. in Human Development and Psychology from the Harvard Graduate School of Education. She received her Ed.D. in Human Development and Education at Harvard Graduate School of Education where she was a Presidential Scholar. Additionally, she holds a Graduate Certificate in College Counseling from UCLA.

In 2024, Redding married author Dorie Clark.

== Career ==
Redding's research explores student identity development, moral identity, and ethical reasoning skills. She has investigated achievement culture in high schools, fraud in college admissions, and academic dishonesty in high-stakes educational environments. Her work has informed the design of the Harvard College Honor Code and revisions to ethical guidelines in college admissions.

At HGSE, Redding teaches courses in youth development, higher education organizations, and research methods. In 2023, she received the Morningstar Family Teaching Award, recognizing outstanding impact on students and the Harvard community.

Redding is co-author (with Nancy E. Hill) of The End of Adolescence: The Lost Art of Delaying Adulthood, which focuses on the transition to adulthood and the historical precedence and rationale for extending the time to adulthood. They have also shared this work in the American Psychological Association's APA Handbook of Pediatric Psychology, Developmental-Behavioral Pediatrics, and Developmental Science and in several pieces published by The Atlantic .

Her newest book, *Mental Health in College: What Research Tells Us About Supporting Students* will be released by Harvard Education Press in April 2026.

== Publications ==
- Redding, A. (2025). Mental Health in College: What Research Tells Us About Supporting College Students. Harvard Education Press.
- Hill, N.E. & Redding, A. Chapter 16: Unpacking extended adolescence: Ecological contexts, relationships, and pathways to adulthood. In Bornstein, M.H. & Shah, P.E. (2025). APA Handbook of Pediatric Psychology, Developmental-Behavioral Pediatrics, and Developmental Science. Washington, DC: American Psychological Association Publishers.
- Hill, N. E., & Redding, A. (2021). The End of Adolescence: The Lost Art of Delaying Adulthood. Harvard University Press.
