= Phasing and Recoverability =

Book by Daniel Silverman

- Author: Daniel Silverman
- Language: English
- Subject: phonology
- Publisher: Garland Publishing
- Publication date: 1997
- Media type: Print
- Pages: 242
- ISBN: 9780815328766

Phasing and Recoverability is a 1997 book by Daniel Silverman in which the author provides a hypothesis that examines not only at the physical structure of speech, but also the phonological issue of salience. The book is a revised edition of Silverman's 1995 UCLA dissertation.

== Reception ==
The book was reviewed by Kimary Shahin (from Birzeit University/University of British Columbia) and Stefan Frisch (from University of Michigan).
