= Catherine Best =

American psycholinguist

Catherine (Cathi) Best
- Awards: NIH postdoctoral fellowship grant, NIH Research Career Development Award

Academic background
- Education: Michigan State University (PhD)
- Thesis: The role of consonant and vowel acoustic features in infant cerebral asymmetries for speech perception (1978)
- Doctoral advisor: Hiram E. Fitzgerald; Lauren Julius Harris
- Other advisors: Alvin Liberman; Michael Studdert-Kennedy

Academic work
- Discipline: linguistics, psychology
- Sub-discipline: psycholinguistics
- Institutions: Western Sydney University (2004-); Wesleyan University (1984-2004); Columbia University (1980-1984)
- Notable ideas: Perceptual Assimilation Model

Catherine (Cathi) Best is an American psycholinguist and Chair in Psycholinguistic Research at Western Sydney University. She is known for her works on speech perception and production. She developed the Perceptual Assimilation Model for non-native speech perception. In 2007, Best and Michael D. Tyler also proposed an extension of this model for second-language learners, called the PAM-L2.
