= German von Bohn =

19th-century German painter

August German von Bohn (25 February 1812 – 23 January 1899) was a German painter.

== Biography ==
German von Bohn was born in Heilbronn. He first studied in law in Tübingen before he studied painting. He was the student of Henri Lehmann and Ary Scheffer in Paris. He stayed in Rome from 1840 to 1843, then he came back to Paris and was made a Knight of the Legion of Honour in 1853.

In 1857, he settled in Stuttgart and became a court painter. He also made wall paintings in churches in France.

His works are held in several museums in Germany, France and Italy.

He died as a result of a stroke on 23 January 1899.

== Works in public collections ==
- La Mort de Cléopâtre, 1842, oil on canvas, Fine Arts Museum, Nantes

== Bibliography ==
- Nekrolog in Kunstchronik, Wochenschrift für Kunst und Gewerbe, NF 10 (in German). 1899. p. 216.
- Mager, Tino (2012). "Bohn, German von (Guermann Bohn)". In Savoy, Bénédicte; Nerlich, France (eds.). Pariser Lehrjahre. Ein Lexikon zur Ausbildung deutscher Maler in der französischen Hauptstadt (in German). Vol. 1: 1793–1843. Berlin: De Gruyter. pp. 28–30. ISBN 978-3-11-029057-8.
