= Janet Pierrehumbert =

American linguist

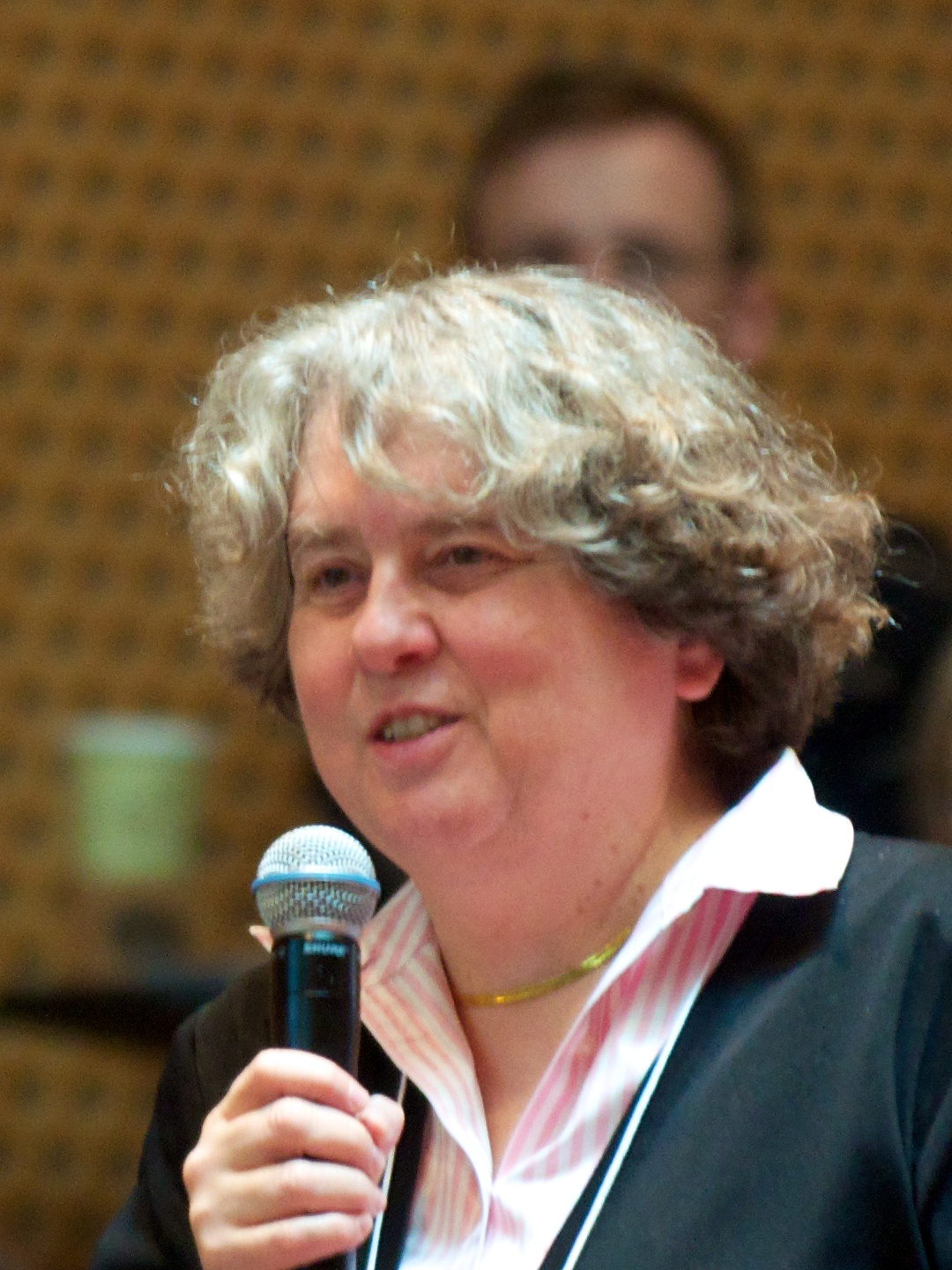
- Education: MIT, Harvard
- Awards: Member of the National Academy of Sciences, Fellow of the American Academy of Arts and Sciences, Fellow of the Linguistic Society of America
- Scientific career
- Fields: Phonology, Phonetics, Cognitive Science
- Workplaces: University of Oxford, Northwestern, AT&T Bell Labs
- Doctoral advisor: Morris Halle

Janet Breckenridge Pierrehumbert /pɪərˈhʌmbərt/ is an American linguist who is Professor of Language Modelling in the Oxford e-Research Centre at the University of Oxford and a senior research fellow of Trinity College, Oxford. She developed an intonational model which includes a grammar of intonation patterns and an explicit algorithm for calculating pitch contours in speech, as well as an account of intonational meaning. It has been influential in speech technology, psycholinguistics, and theories of language form and meaning. Pierrehumbert is also affiliated with the New Zealand Institute of Language Brain and Behaviour at the University of Canterbury.

== Education ==
Pierrehumbert has an AB in Linguistics from Harvard University in 1975 and a PhD in Linguistics from Massachusetts Institute of Technology in 1980.

== Career ==
Pierrehumbert did her postdoctoral work in the Research Laboratory of Electronics at MIT. She joined AT&T Bell Labs as a member of Technical Staff in linguistics and artificial intelligence research in 1982, where her collaborators included Mary Beckman, Julia Hirschberg, and Mark Liberman. She moved to the linguistics department at Northwestern University in 1989. At Northwestern University, Pierrehumbert served as department chair and director of graduate studies. In 2015, she took up her present position in the Oxford e-Research Centre in the Department of Engineering Sciences at Oxford. She has held visiting appointments at Stanford University, Oxford, the Royal Institute of Technology, ENST, École Normale Supérieure, and Stockholm University. She is one of the founders of the Association for Laboratory Phonology, an interdisciplinary initiative to develop advanced scientific methods for studying language sound structure.

== Research ==
Pierrehumbert's research uses experimental and computational methods to study the structure of language systems. Her current research focuses on the dynamics of the lexicon in individuals and populations. It uses large-scale text mining, computational modelling, and experimental paradigms that resemble computer games.

== Honours and awards ==
Pierrehumbert received a Guggenheim Fellowship in 1996, and is also a fellow of the American Academy of Arts and Sciences, the Linguistic Society of America, and the Cognitive Science Society. She held the Edward Sapir Professorship at the 2013 Linguistic Society of America Summer Institute hosted by the University of Michigan. In 2019 she was elected a member of the US National Academy of Sciences. She is the 2020 recipient of the Medal for Scientific Achievement from the International Speech Communication Association. In 2024, Pierrehumbert was elected a Fellow of Academia Europaea.

== Personal life ==
Pierrehumbert is married to Raymond Pierrehumbert, Halley Professor of Physics at the University of Oxford.
