= Michael Hammond (linguist) =

American linguist (born 1957)

- Born: 1957 (age 68–69)

Academic background
- Education: University of California, Los Angeles (BA, PhD)
- Thesis: Constraining Metrical Theory: A Modular Theory of Rhythm and Destressing (1984)
- Doctoral advisor: Bruce Hayes

Academic work
- Discipline: Linguist
- Institutions: University of Arizona

Michael Hammond (born 1957) is an American linguist and professor at the University of Arizona. He was head of the Department of Linguistics from 2001 to 2011. He is the author or editor of six books on a variety of topics from Syntactic Typology, The Phonology of English, to Computational linguistics. He is known for his research on meter and poetics. He has also published more than 40 articles and presented at over 60 conferences on these topics. He serves on the editorial board of several major journals.

== Education and early career ==
Hammond received his BA in linguistics from UCLA in 1979 and his PhD in 1984. His PhD thesis on phonology was published as part of the Outstanding Dissertations in Linguistics series. From 1983 to 1984 he was an assistant professor in the Department of Linguistics at the University of Minnesota, and from 1984 to 1988 at the University of Wisconsin–Milwaukee. He joined the University of Arizona faculty in 1988.

== Selected publications ==
Books

- Hammond, Michael T.; Michael P. Noonan (1988). Theoretical Morphology: Approaches in Modern Linguistics. Academic Press. ISBN 978-0-12-322046-2.
- Hammond, Michael (1999). The Phonology of English : A Prosodic Optimality-Theoretic Approach. Oxford University Press. ISBN 978-0-19-158355-1.

Articles and book chapters

- Hammond, Michael (1987). "Hungarian cola*". Phonology Yearbook. 4 (1): 265–269. doi:10.1017/S0952675700000865.
- Hammond, Michael (1997). "Optimality theory and prosody". In Diana Archangeli; Terry Langendoen (eds.). Optimality Theory: An Overview. Wiley. pp. 33–58. ISBN 978-0-631-20226-4.
- Hammond, Michael (1997). "Vowel Quantity and Syllabification in English". Language. 73 (1): 1–17. doi:10.2307/416591. ISSN 0097-8507. JSTOR 416591.
- Hammond, Michael (2000) [1995]. "There is no lexicon!". Coyote Papers. 10: 55–77.
- Zamuner, Tania S.; Gerken, Louann; Hammond, Michael (2004). "Phonotactic probabilities in young children's speech production". Journal of Child Language. 31 (3): 515–536. doi:10.1017/S0305000904006233. ISSN 0305-0009. PMID 15612388.
- Davis, Stuart; Hammond, Michael (2009). "On the status of onglides in American English". Phonology. 12 (2): 159–182. doi:10.1017/S0952675700002463. ISSN 0952-6757.
