= Janet Fletcher =

Australian linguist

Janet Fletcher FAHA is an Australian linguist. She completed her BA (with honours) at the University of Queensland in 1981 and then moved to the United Kingdom and received her PhD from the University of Reading in 1989.

Fletcher's research interests include phonetics theory, prosodic phonology, laboratory phonology, and articulatory and acoustic modelling of prosodic effects in various languages, particularly indigenous Australian languages and French.

Fletcher is currently professor of phonetics in the School of Languages and Linguistics, where she is a member of the Research Unit for Indigenous Language in the School of Languages and Linguistics and is a chief investigator in the University of Melbourne node of the Centre of Excellence "Dynamics of Language". She is a fellow of the Australian Academy of the Humanities.

== Selected publications ==
- (2014) Fletcher, Janet. 'Intonation and Prosody in Dalabon.' In Jun S (ed), Prosodic Typology II, pp. 252–272. Oxford: Oxford University Press.
- (2011) Tabain. M., J. Fletcher and A. Butcher. 'An EPG study of Palatal Consonants in two Australian languages', Language and Speech, vol. 54, issue 2, pp. 265–282.
- (2010) Fletcher, Janet. 'The Prosody of Speech: Timing and Rhythm,' in W. Hardcastle, J. Laver and F. Gibbon (eds), The Handbook of Phonetic Sciences, pp. 523–602. Wiley-Blackwell Publishing.
- (2007) Yallop, Clark and Janet Fletcher. An Introduction to Phonetics and Phonology. Blackwell Publishers.
