= The Society of Hellman Fellows =

- The Society of Hellman Fellows
- Formation: 1995
- Founder: Chris and Warren Hellman
- Website: https://www.hellmanfellows.org/

The Society of Hellman Fellows is an endowed program at the University of California campuses which offers research funding and early career fellowships to assistant professors who have ability for great distinction in their fields. The society was established in 1995 by Chris and Warren Hellman and has provided funding to more than 1,900 people.

== Notable recipients ==
- Sara Wallace Goodman
- Marc Garellek
- Amir AghaKouchak
- Safiya Noble
