= Sun-Ah Jun =

Korean-American linguist (born 1959)

Sun-Ah Jun (born November 6, 1959) is a Korean-American professor of linguistics at the University of California, Los Angeles.

== Education ==
Jun received her Ph.D. in linguistics from Ohio State University in 1993, with a dissertation entitled, The Phonetics and Phonology of Korean Prosody.

== Research ==
As a professor at UCLA's Department of Linguistics, Jun is known for her research in the areas of Phonetics, Laboratory Phonology, Intonational Phonology, Prosody, and Language Acquisition. She is the editor of two influential volumes on cross-linguistic studies of intonation: Prosodic Typology: The Phonology of Intonation and Phrasing as well as of Prosodic Typology II: The Phonology of Intonation and Phrasing.

== Honors and distinctions ==
In 2014-2015 Jun was the President of the International Circle of Korean Linguistics.

In 2024-2026 Jun is the President of the Association for Laboratory Phonology.

In 2025 Jun was elected as a Fellow of the Linguistic Society of America.

== Selected publications ==
Jun Sun-Ah. 1998. The Accentual Phrase in the Korean prosodic hierarchy. Phonology 15(2):189-226. doi:10.1017/S0952675798003571.

Jun, Sun-Ah, ed. 2005. Prosodic Typology: the Phonology of Intonation and Phrasing. Oxford University Press. ISBN 9780199208746.

Jun, Sun-Ah, ed. 2015. Prosodic Typology: the Phonology of Intonation and Phrasing. Oxford University Press. ISBN 9780198745402.

Jun, SA. & Fougeron, C. 2000. A Phonological Model of French Intonation. In: Botinis, A. (eds) Intonation. Text, Speech and Language Technology, vol 15. Dordrecht: Springer. doi.org/10.1007/978-94-011-4317-2_10
