= Caroline Smith (geologist) =

British geologist

- Education: University of St Andrews; The Open University
- Scientific career
- Fields: Meteoritics; Geochemistry
- Workplaces: Natural History Museum, London

Caroline Smith is the Head of Earth Sciences Collections and Principal Curator of Meteorites at the Natural History Museum in London, UK. She specializes in geochemistry, meteorites, microscopy, mineralogy, and public outreach.

== Career ==
Smith earned her BSc (Hons) in Geology from the University of St Andrews, United Kingdom (1998) and her PhD from The Open University, United Kingdom, in 2002. In 2012, she was named an Honorary Research Fellow of The University of Glasgow, School of Geographical and Earth Sciences, United Kingdom.

Smith has participated in numerous international science working groups. In 2014, she was chosen to be the UK representative to the International Mars Exploration Working Group and the co-chair of the International Mars Architecture for the Return of Samples (iMARS) Working Group Science Team, which assessed programmatic considerations relating to Mars Sample Return.

In addition to science investigations, Smith is responsible for acquiring meteorites and samples for the Natural History Museum's scientific and public collections. In 2012, she carried the museum's largest Martian meteorite sample—a piece of the Tissint meteorite—in her carry-on luggage. She provided a small piece of Zagami, a Martian meteorite, for calibration and testing of the Mars 2020 SHERLOC instrument. Part of the meteorite will be mounted on the rover and sent back to Mars.

Smith has appeared in numerous television documentaries discussing the importance of meteorites. She is the co-author of Meteorites, a Natural History Museum publication, which provides a detailed introduction to these space objects.

== Selected publications ==
- The Potential Science and Engineering Value of Samples Delivered to Earth by Mars Sample Return
- Chronology of martian breccia NWA 7034 and the formation of the martian crustal dichotomy. Science Advances, 4 (5) : eaap8306 - eaap8306.
- Taking the pulse of Mars via dating of a plume-fed volcano. Nature Communications, 8 (1) :
