= Mircea Steriade =

Canadian neuroscientist

Mircea Steriade (August 20, 1924 – April 14, 2006), MD, DSc, was a prominent researcher in systems neuroscience. He was born in Bucharest, Romania, and studied medicine at University of Bucharest. He emigrated to Canada in 1968, where he became a professor of physiology at Université Laval in Quebec, a position he held for the rest of his life.

He is the father of linguist, Donca Steriade. He died at the Montreal General Hospital.

== Research ==
While at Laval University, he discovered that the slow oscillations of NREM sleep arise when groups of neurons fire together for a little while (so-called "on periods"), then fall silent for about a fraction of a second ("off periods"), and then resume their synchronized firing. This was one of the fundamental discoveries in sleep research. After his discovery, scientists have also discovered that in birds and mammals, the slow waves are large if preceded by a long period of wakefulness and become smaller as sleep goes on.

The majority of his research was on corticothalamic oscillations. He was among the first to study the dynamics of the brain during sleep, and one of his key discoveries was determining the role of thalamic reticular neurons as pacemakers in producing the sleep spindle rhythm. He also discovered slow (<1 Hz) sleep rhythms associated with intracortical activity.

== Honors ==
In 1998, Steriade was the recipient of the Gloor Award of the American Clinical Neurophysiology Society.
