= Caroline Smith (linguist) =

American linguist

Caroline L. Smith
- Spouse: Ian Maddieson (died 2025)

Academic background
- Education: Yale University (PhD); Bryn Mawr College (BA)
- Thesis: The timing of vowel and consonant gestures (1992)
- Doctoral advisor: Louis M. Goldstein

Academic work
- Discipline: linguistics
- Sub-discipline: phonology
- Institutions: University of New Mexico

Caroline L. Smith is an American linguist and Professor at the Department of Linguistics at the University of New Mexico. She is known for her works on phonology and is a founding member of the Association for Laboratory Phonology.
