= Endangered Language Fund =

- Type: Non Profit
- Headquarters: New Haven, Connecticut
- Region served: International
- President: Kristine Hildebrandt
- Website: www.endangeredlanguagefund.org

The Endangered Language Fund (ELF) is a small non-profit organization based in New Haven, Connecticut. ELF supports endangered language maintenance and documentation projects that aim to preserve the world's languages while contributing rare linguistic data to the scientific community.

== Introduction ==
The Fund has sponsored over 100 language projects in 30 countries since 1997, and has recently begun developing a large digital archive of endangered language data. ELF's main mechanism of support work is funding for individuals, tribes and museums. Supported programs have been projects to develop indigenous radio programs in South Dakota, recording elders and last living speakers of endangered languages, and the production of materials to be used for language teaching programs all over the world.

There are two main grant programs that accept proposals annually, the Language Legacies Grant and Native Voices. The Language Legacies Grant supports language revitalization and documentation efforts from all over the world. It is open to community members and language research scholars across the country. Native Voices is a grant managed and distributed by ELF for Native American language revitalization from the Native Voices Endowment: A Lewis & Clark Expedition Bicentennial Legacy. Grants through this program are available to members of the Native American tribes that came in contact with the Lewis and Clark Expedition between 1803-1806. Applicants must be Federally Recognized tribal enrolled members, tribal language programs, and tribal schools and colleges.

In addition, ELF sponsors a workshop called The Breath of Life for Native American communities who have either no living speakers or few or no fluent speakers. At the workshop, linguistic mentors are paired with participants to explore language resources and archives. The workshop is supplemented with lectures and workshops on linguistics and related topics such as language learning and teaching. The name and design is based on the Breath of Life Language Workshop for California Indians, a biennial event designed and organized by the Advocates for Indigenous California Language Survival and hosted at the University of California at Berkeley.

ELF is also responsible for an initiative known as Healing Through Language, which aims both to support indigenous language revitalization programs and to measure their effect on the health of indigenous communities.

The founder of the Endangered Language fund is Douglas Whalen, who served as its president until 2015, at which time he became Chair of the Board of Directors. The current president is Kristine Hildebrandt and the vice president is Shannon Bischoff. The offices of the Fund are presently located in space lent by Haskins Laboratories. There is no formal affiliation between the two organizations.

The ELF is associated with the international network of the Linguapax Institute, as the lead of Linguapax North America.
