= Patricia Keating =

American linguist and noted phonetician (born 1952)

- Born: July 20, 1952 (age 73)
- Education: Brown University (PhD)
- Spouse: Bruce Hayes(m. 1989)
- Scientific career
- Fields: linguistics
- Institutions: University of California, Los Angeles
- Thesis: A Phonetic Study of a Voicing Contrast in Polish (1980)
- Doctoral advisor: Sheila Blumstein
- Doctoral students: Marc Garellek; Taehong Cho

Patricia Ann Keating (born July 20, 1952) is an American linguist and noted phonetician. She is distinguished research professor emeritus at UCLA.

== Life ==
She received her PhD in Linguistics at Brown University in 1980. In 1980 she joined the faculty of the Linguistics Department at University of California, Los Angeles, where she remained until her retirement. She became a Full Professor and director of the UCLA Phonetics Laboratory in 1991. She also held a position as Distinguished Professor and served as Chair of UCLA Linguistics Department.

Keating is best known for two areas of research in phonetics. She is, with Cécile Fougeron, the discoverer of the initial strengthening effect, wherein consonants receive more fortis articulations (greater degree of articulatory contact) to the extent that they occur at the beginnings of high-ranking phonological phrases. On the theoretical side, she is the inventor of the "window model" of coarticulation, a theory of phonetic realization that specifies a particular range of legal values for each segment along each phonetic parameter.

== Honors and distinctions ==
Keating is a founding member of the Association for Laboratory Phonology and was President of the International Phonetic Association from 2015 to 2019.

She was elected as a Fellow of the Acoustical Society of America in 2004, "for contributions to the integration of the phonetic and linguistic aspects of speech production".

== Personal life ==
Keating is married to linguist Bruce Hayes.

== Selected publications ==
- Fougeron, Cécile and Keating, Patricia A. (1997) Articulatory strengthening at edges of prosodic domains. Journal of the Acoustical Society of America 101: 3728–3740.
- Keating, Patricia A. (1990) The window model of coarticulation : articulatory evidence . In Papers in laboratory phonology I (John Kingston & Mary E. Beckman, eds.). Cambridge : Cambridge University Press, 451–470.
