= Donka Minkova =

American-Bulgarian linguist

- Born: 1944 (age 81–82)

Academic background
- Education: University of Sofia (PhD)

Academic work
- Discipline: Linguistics
- Sub-discipline: Phonetics, Phonology
- Institutions: University of California, Los Angeles

Donka Minkova (born 1944) is a Bulgarian-American linguist and Distinguished Research Professor at the University of California, Los Angeles.

== Books ==
- The History of Final Vowels in English (1991)
- English Words: History and Structure (with Robert Stockwell) (2001, Second Edition 2009)
- Alliteration and Sound Change in Early English (2003)
- A Historical Phonology of English (2014)

=== Edited ===
- Phonological Weakness in English: From Old to Present-Day English (2009)
- Studies in the History of the English Language: A Millennial Perspective (2002)
- Chaucer and the Challenges of Medievalism (2003)
- Empirical and Analytical Advances in the Study of English Language Change (2009)
