= Bruce Hayes (linguist) =

American linguist

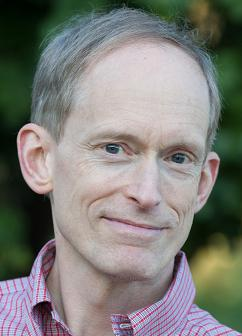
- Photograph by Miriam Geer
- Born: June 9, 1955 (age 71); Seattle, WA
- Education: MIT (PhD), Harvard
- Spouse: Patricia Keating (m. 1989)
- Scientific career
- Fields: Phonology, Generative grammar
- Workplaces: UCLA
- Thesis: A metrical theory of stress rules (1980)
- Doctoral advisor: Morris Halle
- Doctoral students: Michael Hammond

Bruce Hayes (born June 9, 1955) is an American linguist. He is Distinguished Professor Emeritus of Linguistics at the University of California, Los Angeles.

== Life ==
He received his Ph.D. in 1980 from MIT, where his dissertation supervisor was Morris Halle. Hayes works in phonology, and is well known for his book Metrical Stress Theory: Principles and Case Studies, a typologically based theory of stress systems. His research interests also include phonetically based phonology and learnability. In 2009 Hayes was inducted as a Fellow of the Linguistic Society of America. He is married to phonetician Patricia Keating.

== Books ==
- (1985) A Metrical Theory of Stress Rules, Garland Press, New York.
- (1995) Metrical Stress Theory: Principles and Case Studies, University of Chicago Press, Chicago, 15 + 455 pp. ISBN 0-226-32104-5.
- (2004) Hayes, Bruce, Robert Kirchner, and Donca Steriade, eds., Phonetically Based Phonology. Cambridge: Cambridge University Press. ISBN 0-521-82578-4.
- (2008) Introductory Phonology. Malden, MA: Blackwell. ISBN 1-4051-8411-6.
