= Knut Bøhn =

Knut Bøhn (1926 – 1985) was a Norwegian businessperson and judge.

He graduated with the cand.jur. degree in 1951, and after a period as deputy judge in Holmestrand from 1953 to 1955 he was hired in Nora Fabrikker. He worked here from 1955 to 1958 and 1962 to 1975, last as CEO. He was appointed as a judge in Fredrikstad City Court in 1979 and presiding judge in Eidsivating Court of Appeal in 1982. He died in 1985. He resided at Kolbotn.
