= Robert Ladd (linguist) =

Robert Ladd FBA
- Born: Dwight Robert Ladd Jr; 5 March 1947 (age 79)
- Citizenship: American and British

Academic background
- Education: Brown University (BA); Cornell University (MA, PhD)

Academic work
- Discipline: Linguist
- Sub-discipline: Phonetics, phonology
- Institutions: University of Edinburgh

Dwight Robert Ladd Jr, FBA (born 5 March 1947), is a linguist and retired academic specialising in phonetics and phonology. From 1997 to 2011, he was Professor of Linguistics at the University of Edinburgh.

== Career ==
Dwight Robert Ladd Jr, known professionally as D. Robert Ladd, was born on 5 March 1947 and studied at Brown University, graduating in 1968 with a Bachelor of Arts degree in linguistics. After spending two years in the US Army, he studied at Cornell University (1970–72) to complete a Master of Arts degree in linguistics. After a year lecturing at the Heidelberg University, he returned to Cornell in 1975 to carry out doctoral studies, and was awarded his PhD in 1978 for his thesis "The structure of intonational meaning". Having spent a year lecturing at Cornell, he lectured at the University of Cluj as a Fulbright Scholar (1978–79), before holding a number of short-term positions at Cornell (1979–80, 1984), the University of Pennsylvania (1980–81), Bucknell University (1980–81), the University of Giessen (1981–83) and the University of Sussex (1983–84). He was then appointed a lecturer in the Department of Linguistics at the University of Edinburgh in 1985. He was promoted to a readership there in 1989, and then to a professorship in linguistics in 1997. Ladd retired in 2011 and became an emeritus professor and honorary professorial fellow at Edinburgh.

According to his British Academy profile, Ladd's research focuses on "phonology and phonetics, and the relation between them ('laboratory phonology')", as well as "intonation and prosody, including focus, emotion, pitch perception, tone languages, and links between language and music". He was a founding member of the Association for Laboratory Phonology, and served as President from 2010 to 2014.

== Honours and awards ==
In 2015, Ladd was elected a Fellow of the British Academy, the United Kingdom's national academy for the humanities and social sciences. The following year, he was elected a Member of the Academia Europaea.

== Selected publications ==
- The Structure of Intonational Meaning: Evidence from English (Indiana University Press, 1980).
- (Translated) Stefan Pascu, A History of Transylvania (Wayne State University Press, 1982).
- (Co-edited with A. Cutler) Prosody: Models and Measurements (Springer-Verlag, 1983).
- (Co-edited with G. J. Docherty) Papers in Laboratory Phonology II: Gesture, Segment, Prosody (Cambridge University Press, 1992).
- Intonational Phonology, 1st edition (Cambridge University Press, 1996); 2nd edition (Cambridge University Press, 2008).
- Simultaneous Structure in Phonology (Oxford University Press, 2014).
