= Hiram E. Fitzgerald =

American psychologist

Hiram E. Fitzgerald Ph.D.
- Born: November 12, 1940 (age 85); Columbia, Pennsylvania
- Occupation: developmental psychologist

Academic work
- Discipline: Psychology
- Sub-discipline: Developmental Psychology, Infant Mental Health, Experimental Child Psychology
- Institutions: Michigan State University

Hiram E. Fitzgerald is an American developmental psychologist and currently is a University Distinguished Professor Emeritus in the Department of Psychology as well as an Associate Provost Emeritus at Michigan State University.

== Biography ==
Hiram Fitzgerald was born November 12, 1940, in Columbia, Pennsylvania. He earned his Bachelor of Arts degree from Lebanon Valley College and later received his Doctor of Philosophy degree from the University of Denver in 1967, specializing in Experimental Child Psychology. A distinguished multi-sport athlete, Fitzgerald earned All State recognition for basketball and all conference recognition in football playing for Columbia High School and later was inducted into its Hall of Fame. He also was inducted into the Susquehanna Valley Chapter of the Pennsylvania Sports Hall of Fame. At Lebanon Valley College he was the first athlete to be recognized two consecutive years as the college's outstanding athlete, having also been named to the all-conference basketball team and football teams his senior year. He was inducted into the Lebanon Valley College Athletics Hall of Fame in 1981 and in 1996 received its Distinguished Alumnus Award.

Upon completing his doctoral degree at the University of Denver, Fitzgerald took a role as assistant professor of psychology with Michigan State University, where he would spend all of his 53-year academic and administrative career. From 1973 to 1974 he held a Fulbright-Hays Senior Lecturer position at the Institute of Physical Medicine and Rehabilitation in Beograd, Yugoslavia. He also held appointments as an adjunct professor at the University of Michigan, and at two Australian Universities (Curtin University and Edith Cowan University). From 1982 to 1992 he served as executive director of the International Association for Infant Mental Health, and from 1992 to 2008 as executive director of the World Association for Infant Mental Health. Fitzgerald is a Fellow of 5 divisions of the American Psychological Association, and a Charter Fellow of the Association of Psychological Science.

== Research Focus ==
Fitzgerald's research focused on early childhood development, infant learning and attention, infant mental health, and the study of adverse experiences on children and families. His work had a particular focus on the impact of fathers on early childhood development, the etiology of alcoholism, American Indian/Alaska Native early childhood, and family development in community contexts. He also contributed research into implementing community models of organizational process and change as well as research of issues related to the scholarship of community engagement.

== Selected Awards and Honors ==
Fitzgerald has received awards, including:

- The Selmas Fraiberg Award, from the Michigan Association for Infant Mental Health (1986)
- Honorary President, World Association for Infant Mental Health (2008)
- The Dolley Madison Award for Outstanding Lifetime Contributions to the Development and Well Being of Very Young Children, from ZERO TO THREE: National Center for Infants, Toddlers and Families (2006).
- Lifetime Achievement Award, Michigan Campus Compact (2017)
- Elected to the Academy of Community Engagement Scholarship (2014)
- Elected to the International Association for Adult and Continuing Education Hall of Fame (2015)

In addition, two professional associations present named awards at their conferences:

- The Hiram E. Fitzgerald Emerging Scholar Award (Michigan Association for Infant Mental Health)
- The Hiram E. Fitzgerald Engaged Scholar Award (Engagement Scholarship Consortium)
