= Jody Kreiman =

American linguist

Academic background
- Education: University of Chicago (PhD), David Geffen School of Medicine (PostDoc)
- Thesis: (1987)

Academic work
- Discipline: linguistics
- Sub-discipline: phonetics, phonology
- Institutions: University of California, Los Angeles

Jody Kreiman is an American linguist and professor in residence of head and neck surgery at the University of California, Los Angeles. She is known for her works on phonetics and laboratory phonology. She is an elected fellow of the Acoustical Society of America.
