= Peter Ladefoged =

British phonetician (1925–2006)

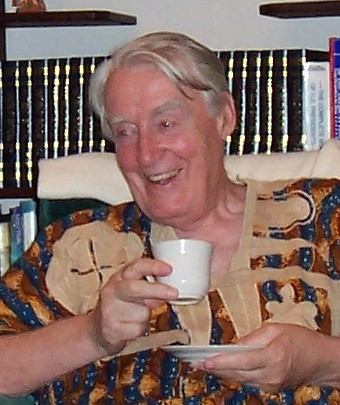
- Ladefoged in 2004
- Born: 17 September 1925; Sutton, London, England
- Died: 24 January 2006 (aged 80); London, England
- Education: Gonville and Caius College, Cambridge; University of Edinburgh
- Scientific career
- Doctoral students: John Ohala

Peter Nielsen Ladefoged (/ˈlædɪfoʊɡɪd/ LAD-if-oh-ghid, Danish: [ˈpʰe̝ˀtɐ ˈne̝lsn̩ ˈlɛːðəˌfoːð̩]; 17 September 1925 – 24 January 2006) was a British linguist and phonetician. He was Professor of Phonetics at University of California, Los Angeles (UCLA), where he taught from 1962 to 1991. His book A Course in Phonetics is a common introductory text in phonetics, and The Sounds of the World's Languages (co-authored with Ian Maddieson) is widely regarded as a standard phonetics reference. Ladefoged also wrote several books on the phonetics of African languages. Prior to UCLA, he was a lecturer at the universities of University of Edinburgh in Scotland (1953–59, 1960–61) and the University of Ibadan in Nigeria (1959–60).

== Early life ==
Peter Ladefoged was born on 17 September 1925, in Sutton (then in Surrey, now in Greater London), England. He attended Haileybury College from 1938 to 1943, and Gonville and Caius College, Cambridge, Cambridge University from 1943 to 1944. He received an MA (1951) and a PhD (1959) in Phonetics from the University of Edinburgh in 1959.

== Career ==
Ladefoged was involved with the phonetics laboratory at UCLA, which he established in 1962. He also was interested in listening to and describing every sound used in spoken human language, which he estimated at 900 consonants and 200 vowels. This research formed the basis of much of The Sounds of the World's Languages. In 1966 Ladefoged moved from the UCLA English Department to join the newly established Linguistics Department.

While at UCLA, Ladefoged was hired as a consultant on the movie My Fair Lady. He wrote the transcriptions that can be seen in Professor Higgins's notebook (based on the Visible Speech system), and his voice was used in the scenes where Higgins describes vowel pronunciation.

Ladefoged was also a member of the International Phonetic Association for a long time, and was President of the Association from 1986 to 1991. He was deeply involved in maintaining its International Phonetic Alphabet, and was the principal mover of the 1989 International Phonetic Association Kiel Convention. He was also editor of the Journal of the International Phonetic Association. Ladefoged served on the board of directors of the Endangered Language Fund since its inception.

In 1992, Ladefoged appeared on the Bill Bixby-hosted TV special The Elvis Conspiracy to give his professional opinion that 1980s recordings purported to be the voice of Elvis Presley were not authentic.

Ladefoged was a founding member of the Association for Laboratory Phonology.

== Personal life ==
Ladefoged married Jenny MacDonald in 1953, a marriage which lasted over 50 years. They had three children: Lise Friedman, a bookseller; Thegn Ladefoged, archaeologist and professor of anthropology at University of Auckland; and Katie Ladefoged, attorney and public defender, residing in Nashville, Tennessee. He also had five grandchildren Zelda Ladefoged, Ethan Friedman, Amy Friedman, Joseph Weiss, and Catherine Weiss.

On May 5, 1970, Ladefoged was arrested and sustained injuries from police while participating in an anti–Vietnam War protest at UCLA. He was initially charged with failure to disperse, but the charge was later changed to assault on a police officer. He was acquitted in the first trial.

== Death ==
Ladefoged died on 24 January 2006 at the age of 80 in hospital in London, England after a research trip to India. He was on his way home to Los Angeles, California from his research trip.

== Academic timeline ==
- 1953–55: Assistant Lecturer in Phonetics, University of Edinburgh
- 1955–59: Lecturer in Phonetics, University of Edinburgh
- 1959–60: Lecturer in Phonetics, University of Ibadan, Nigeria
- 1960–61: Lecturer in Phonetics, University of Edinburgh
- 1961–62: Field fellow, Linguistic Survey of West Africa, Nigeria
- Summer 1960: University of Michigan
- Summer 1961: Royal Institute of Technology, [Kungliga Tekniska högskolan or KTH], (Stockholm, Sweden)
- 1962–63: Assistant Professor of Phonetics, Department of English, UCLA
- 1962: Established, and directed until 1991, the UCLA Phonetics Laboratory
- 1963–65: Associate Professor of Phonetics, Department of Linguistics], UCLA
- 1965–91: Professor of Phonetics, Department of Linguistics, UCLA
- 1977–80: Chair, Department of Linguistics, UCLA
- 1991: "retired" to become UCLA Research Linguist, Distinguished Professor of Phonetics Emeritus
- 2005: Leverhulme Professor, University of Edinburgh
- 2005–06: Adjunct professor at the University of Southern California (USC)

== Academic honours ==
- Fellow of the Acoustical Society of America
- Fellow of the American Speech and Hearing Association
- Distinguished Teaching Award, UCLA 1972
- President, Linguistic Society of America, 1978
- President of the Permanent Council for the Organization of International Congresses of Phonetic Sciences, 1983–1991
- President, International Phonetic Association, 1987–1991
- UCLA Research Lecturer 1989
- Fellow of the American Academy of Arts and Sciences 1990
- UCLA College of Letters and Science Faculty Research Lecturer 1991
- Gold medal, XIIth International Congress of Phonetic Sciences 1991
- Corresponding Fellow of the British Academy 1992
- Honorary D.Litt., University of Edinburgh, 1993
- Foreign Member, Royal Danish Academy of Sciences and Letters, 1993
- Silver medal, Acoustical Society of America 1994
- Corresponding Fellow, Royal Society of Edinburgh, 2001
- Honorary D.Sc. Queen Margaret University, Edinburgh, 2002

== Selected publications ==
- Ladefoged (1962). The nature of vowel quality.
  Monograph supplement to Revista do Laboratório de Fonética Experimental da Faculdade de Letras da Universidade de Coimbra
  (Journal of Experimental Phonetics Laboratory of the Faculty of Arts, University of Coimbra).
- Ladefoged (1962). Elements of acoustic phonetics. University of Chicago Press.
  - Paperback edition 1971.
  - Translation into Japanese, Taishukan Publishing Company, 1976.
  - Second edition, with added chapters on computational phonetics, 1996. ISBN 0-226-46764-3.
- Ladefoged (1968) [1964]. A phonetic study of west African languages. Cambridge: Cambridge University. ISBN 0-521-06963-7.
- Ladefoged (1967). Three areas of experimental phonetics. London: Oxford University Press. ISBN 0-19-437110-7.
- Ladefoged, Peter; Ruth Glick; Clive Criper (1969). Language in Uganda. Nairobi: Oxford University Press. ISBN 0-19-436101-2.
- Ladefoged (1971). Preliminaries to linguistic phonetics. Chicago: University of Chicago Press.
- Ladefoged (1975). A course in phonetics. Orlando: Harcourt Brace. ISBN 0-15-507319-2. 2nd ed 1982, 3rd ed. 1993, 4th ed. 2001, 5th ed. Boston: Thomson/Wadsworth 2006, 6th ed. 2011 (co-author Keith Johnson) Boston: Wadsworth/Cengage Learning. Japanese translation 2000.
- Ladefoged, Peter; Maddieson, Ian (1996). The Sounds of the World's Languages. Oxford: Blackwell. ISBN 0-631-19815-6.
- Ladefoged (2001). Vowels and consonants: An introduction to the sounds of languages. Oxford: Blackwell. ISBN 0-631-21412-7.
  - Second edition 2004. ISBN 978-1405124584.
  - Third edition 2012 (post-mortem). ISBN 978-1444334296.
- Ladefoged (2003). Phonetic data analysis: An introduction to instrumental phonetic fieldwork. Oxford: Blackwell. ISBN 0-631-23270-2.
- Ladefoged (2006). Interactive CD-ROM for "A Course in Phonetics". ISBN 1-4130-1420-8.
- Ladefoged (2006). Representing linguistic phonetic structure (PDF). UCLA. Draft, work-in-progress leading up to death.

== Works involved in or about ==
- George Cukor (director), Alan Jay Lerner (lyricist): My Fair Lady. Motion picture film. (1964).
- Fromkin, Victoria A., ed. (1985). Phonetic linguistics: Essays in honor of Peter Ladefoged. Orlando: Academic Press. ISBN 0-12-268990-9.
