= Donca Steriade =

Professor of Linguistics

Donca Steriade (born 1951 in Bucharest) is a Romanian-American professor of Linguistics at MIT, specializing in phonological theory.

== Education ==
She began her academic career studying classics in Bucharest, after earning her B.A. (licență) in Philology from the University of Bucharest in 1974. She left Romania after her father emigrated to Canada. (She is the daughter of neuroscientist Mircea Steriade.) She earned her M.A. from Université Laval in 1976, She studied for her PhD at the MIT Department of Linguistics and Philosophy under Morris Halle. Her 1982 dissertation is titled, "Greek prosodies and the nature of syllabification".

After earning her PhD, she took up a position at UCLA before returning to MIT to become Professor of Linguistics.

== Honors ==
Steriade was named Professor Honoris Causa by the Faculty of Letters at the University of Bucharest in 2017.

She was inducted as a LSA (Linguistics Society of America) Fellow in 2015. She was invited to give the Edward Sapir lecture at the 2009 LSA Linguistic Institute and she was an instructor at the 2007 LSA Linguistic Institute.

== Research ==
Steriade's research focuses on phonology and morphophonology, and she is considered a leading contributor to theories of underspecification (Steriade 1995) and neutralization (Steriade 2007). She has also researched the basic units of rhythm in language. She has worked on a range of Indo-European languages and has published and co-published broadly, including journal articles and book chapters. She is a co-editor of the widely cited volume, Phonetically Based Phonology (Hayes et al. 2004), and co-author of the popular textbook, Linguistics: An Introduction to Linguistic Theory (Hayes et al. 1999).

== Key publications ==
- Hayes, Bruce, Robert Kirchner and Donca Steriade. 2004. Phonetically Based Phonology. Cambridge University Press. doi:10.1017/CBO9780511486401
- Hayes, Bruce et al. 1999. Linguistics: an Introduction to Linguistics Theory. Wiley-Blackwell. ISBN 978-0-631-19711-9
- Steriade, Donca (2007) Contrast. In The Cambridge Handbook of Phonology, ed. P. de Lacy. Cambridge University Press, pp. 139–158.
- Steriade, Donca (2002) The Syllable. In The International Encyclopedia of Linguistics, ed. W. Frawley. Oxford University Press.
- Steriade, Donca (2001) Directional asymmetries in place assimilation: A perceptual account. In The Role of Speech Perception in Phonology, eds. E. Hume and K. Johnson, pp 219–250. New York: Academic Press.
- Steriade, Donca (2000) Paradigm uniformity and the phonetics-phonology boundary. In Papers in Laboratory Phonology V: Acquisition and the Lexicon, eds. M. B. Broe and J. B. Pierrehumbert, 313–334. Cambridge: Cambridge University Press.
- Steriade, Donca (1995) Underspecification and markedness. In J. Goldsmith (ed.) The Handbook of Phonological Theory. Oxford: Blackwell, pp 114–174.
- Steriade, Donca (1988) Reduplication and syllable transfer in Sanskrit and elsewhere. Phonology 5, 73-155.
- Steriade, Donca (1987) Locality conditions and feature geometry. Proceedings of NELS 17, 595–618.
