= Journal of Phonetics =

- Discipline: Phonetics, phonology
- Language: English
- Edited by: Jeff Mielke

Publication details
- History: 1973–present
- Publisher: Elsevier
- Frequency: bimonthly
- Impact factor: 2.67 (2020)

Standard abbreviations
- ISO 4: J. Phon.

Indexing
- ISSN: 0095-4470 (print); 1095-8576 (web)
- LCCN: 73644848
- OCLC no.: 36945983

Links
- Journal homepage; Online access

The Journal of Phonetics is a peer-reviewed academic journal that covers topics in phonetics and phonology. It was established in 1973 and appears six times a year. It is published by Elsevier and the current editor-in-chief is Jeff Mielke (North Carolina State University).

According to the Journal Citation Reports, the journal has a 2020 impact factor of 2.67, ranked among top 10% in the field of linguistics. The journal also has a 2025 CiteScore of 4.4 (based on the citations recorded in the Scopus), ranked among top 5% in the field of Language and Linguistics.

== Aims and scope ==
The Journal of Phonetics publishes papers of an experimental or theoretical nature that deal with phonetic aspects of language and linguistic communication processes. Papers dealing with technological and/or pathological topics, or papers of an interdisciplinary nature are also suitable, provided that linguistic-phonetic principles underlie the work reported.

Regular articles, review articles, and letters to the editor are published. Themed issues are also published, devoted entirely to a specific subject of interest within the field of phonetics.

== Editors-in-Chief ==
- 1973-1985 M. A. A. Tatham (University of Essex, UK)
- 1985-1989 M. P. R. van den Broecke (University of Utrecht, the Netherlands)
- 1989-1995 Mary Beckman (Ohio State University, USA)
- 1995-1997 Patrice Speeter Beddor (University of Michigan, USA)
- 1998-1999 Terrance M. Nearey and Bruce L. Derwing (University of Alberta, Canada)
- 1999-2007 Gerry Docherty (University of Newcastle upon Tyne, UK)
- 2008-2011 Stefan A. Frisch (University of South Florida, USA)
- 2011-2016 Kenneth de Jong (Indiana University, USA)
- 2016- Taehong Cho (Hanyang University, Seoul, Korea)

== Abstracting and indexing ==
The journal is abstracted and indexed in:

- Abstracts in Anthropology
- Arts and Humanities Citation Index
- Communication and Mass Media Complete
- Current Contents
- Dietrich's Index Philosophicus
- EMCARE
- ERIC
- International Bibliography of the Social Sciences
- Internationale Bibliographie der Rezensionen Geistes- und Sozialwissenschaftlicher Literatur
- Linguistics and Language Behavior Abstracts
- Language Teaching
- Linguistics Abstracts Online
- MLA International Bibliography
- PASCAL
- Periodicals Index Online
- PsycINFO
- Scopus
- Social Sciences Citation Index
