= Abdelkader Fassi Fehri =

Moroccan linguist

- Born: April 20, 1947 (age 79); Fez, Morocco

Academic background
- Thesis: Complémentation et anaphore en arabe moderne. Une approche lexicale fonctionnelle (1981)

Academic work
- Discipline: Linguistics
- Institutions: Mohammed V University
- Website: https://sites.google.com/site/abdelkaderfassi/

Abdelkader Fassi Fehri (Arabic: عبد القادر الفاسي الفهري)(born 20 April 1947) is a Moroccan leading figure specializing in Arabic and comparative linguistics, including syntax, morphology, lexicon, and semantics. He has been associated with Mohammed V University in Rabat, and the Linguistic Society of Morocco. His work has modernized the Arabic field and is tools, having implemented generative and lexical-functional approaches to the investigation of the Arabic language. He has also produced significant work on Arabic language management and planning, linguistic justice, and terminology.

Fassi Fehri has received the King Faisal Prize for Arabic Language and Literature in 2006 for his outstanding work on the Arabic language from the perspective of modern linguistics. He has also received Moroccan state honors and international grants, and has held academic and institutional positions connected with Arabic-language research and language planning.

== Early life and education ==
Fassi Fehri was born in Fez, Morocco, on 20 April 1947. He received his early education in Morocco in philology, literature, and philosophy, before pursuing advanced studies in France, and postdoctoral and senior research during his frequent visits and scholarships at MIT and Stanford University. His doctoral research was undertaken at the University of Paris III, where he completed a doctorate in Arabic linguistics. His 1981 Doctorat d’Etat dissertation, Complémentation et anaphore en arabe moderne: une approche lexicale fonctionnelle, he inverstigated various complementation and anaphora phenomena in modern Arabic from a lexical-functional perspective. The dissertation is cited in the scholarly literature on lexical-functional grammar and generative Arabic syntax. It was published in 1982 by the University of Rabat under the titele: Linguistique arabe: forme et interpretation.

His early research placed Arabic within the emerging international literature on formal and functional approaches to syntax. Rather than treating Arabic grammar solely through traditional grammatical categories, he investigated how syntactic structure, lexical properties and interpretation interact, or as Chomsky put it, when blurbing his Key Features and Parameters in Arabic Grammar:

Fassi Fehri acknowledges the impact of numerous eminent professors and colleagues throughout times and places on his research, including Noam Chomsky, Kenneth L. Hale, Joseph Emonds, Richard S. Kayne, Joan W. Bresnan, Charles A. Ferguson, Bernard Pottier, Gérard Troupeau, Anders Holmberg, Pino Longobardi, Jacqueline Guéron, Teun Hoekstra, Guglielmo Cinque, Peter Hallman, Jonathan Owens, Stan Peters, Jim Higginbotham, Jean-Roger-Vergnaud, Richard Larson, Morris Halle, Mohamed Najib Al-Bahbiitii, Amjad at-Tabulsii and Driss Serghrouchni.

== Academic career ==
Fassi Fehri began teaching and researching linguistics at Mohammed V University, staring from 1972, initially in Fez and later in Rabat. According to a 2013 announcement concerning an International Conference on Arabic linguistics to his Honor, he was the first to have introduced the study and investigation of generative grammar in Morocco, at Mohammed V University in 1972. He subsequently became chair of Arabic and comparative linguistics and doctoral studies, supervising numerous master's and doctoral research, and contributing to the training of linguists in Morocco and elsewhere in the Arab world.

He has been also associated with the Institute for the Study and Research on Arabization (IERA) at Mohammed V University, where he served as director from 1994 to 2005. His work at the institute extended beyond theoretical linguistics to terminology, language planning and the development of resources for Arabic. There, he launched the first comparative linguistic journal in Morocco, entitled Linguistic Research in 1995, published by IERA since then.

Fassi Fehri is a founding figure of the Linguistic Society of Morocco ( LSM), having served as its founding and acting president from 1986. The LSM has become a venue for research and scholarly exchange concerning Arabic and general linguistics around the world, organizing various internal conferences since 1987. In 1997, the LSM organized the 20th annual GLOW conference in Rabat, bringing in Morocco a famous international generative linguistics event organized for the first time outside Europe.

Fassi Fehri has also served as a member of the Morocco's Royal Commission for the Reform of Education, and participated in initiatives concerned with Arabic language development, policy, translation, and terminology. He has been a member of the Executive Bureau of the Arabic Organization of Translation, the Arabic Thought Foundation's language initiative, the Historical Dictionary of the Arabic Language in Doha, the Award Prize for the Arabic language in Dubai, and other Arabic language academies and planning institutions.

== Linguistic research ==
Fassi Fehri's research has concentrated on the formal structure of Arabic and on questions concerning the interaction of lexical, morphological, syntactic and semantic information. His early work was influenced by lexical-functional approaches to grammar, while his later research engaged with generative minimalism, comparative parametric theory and Distributed Morphology.

=== Arabic syntax and morphology ===
His major early monograph, Issues in the Structure of Arabic Clauses and Words, was published by Kluwer Academic in 1993 as volume 29 of the series Studies in Natural Language and Linguistic Theory. The book comprises studies of Arabic clause structure, word order, agreement, case, pronouns, incorporation, feature specification, temporal and modal categories, and inflectional projections in noun phrases. The Bibliothèque nationale de France catalogs the work under Arabic generative grammar and Government and Binding theory.

The book developed a syntactic approach to several properties of Arabic words and clauses. It treated questions of word order, agreement and case together with the internal structure of nominal and verbal expressions, helping place Arabic data within wider debates in generative syntax. Its publication subsequently made it one of Fassi Fehri's most frequently cited works in the international literature on Arabic syntax.

His research later moved toward questions concerning grammatical features, temporal and aspectual interpretation, nominal structure, plurality, genericity and the interaction of morphosyntax and semantics. Key Features and Parameters in Arabic Grammar, published by John Benjamins in 2012, examines these questions from the perspective of generative minimalism and comparative parametric theory. Its subjects include tense, aspect and actionality, verbal number, bare nouns, count and mass distinctions, adjective ordering, possession, proper names, vocatives, temporal anchoring and silent pronouns.

=== Lexicon and word formation ===
A continuing theme in Fassi Fehri's work has been the structure of the Arabic lexicon and the role of consonantal roots and morphological templates. His research argues for analyses in which roots and their structural properties play a central role in Arabic word formation rather than treating Arabic lexical structure simply as a sequence of stem and affix operations. His later work connects these questions with Distributed Morphology and theories of minimal computation.

His book on Al-Maʿjama wa-at-Tawsīṭ: Naẓarāt Jadīda fī Qaḍāyā al-Lugha al-ʿArabiyya (1997), commonly rendered as Lexicalization and Parametrization: New Perspectives on Questions of Arabic, developed further questions concerning Arabic lexical and grammatical structure. The book was published by the Arab Cultural Centre in Casablanca.

In 2021, he published al-mucjam l-carabii t-tanawwucii. Fassi Fehri's more recent research has developed what he calls a root-based approach to the Arabic lexical structure. His 2026 book The New Arabic Lexicon and Its Words: Root-Based and Templatic Morphosyntax, published by John Benjamins, presents a broad analysis of Arabic word formation and argument structure. The book argues that roots and templates should be treated as primitive lexical units, and he applies the approach to account for various phenomena including causatives, anticausatives, reflexives, nominalizations, psychological predicates, perception and cognition.

=== Number, plurality, quantification, and Gender ===
Another major strand of his research concerns grammatical Number, Plurality, Quantification, Gender, and agreement in Arabic. His studies have examined how number can interact with different grammatical categories and how Arabic expresses plurality and universal distributive interpretation. In ‘Number and Gender Convergence: The Arabic Plurative’ (2020), published in the Catalan Journal of Linguistics, he examined the interaction between number and gender in Arabic singulative and plurative constructions. He established a third grammatical subclass of plurals, the plurative, which denotes a plural unity, in addition to the known distributive sound and broken plurals. His theory of number, atomicity, countability, and why verbs are not ‘numbered’ is further detailed in his ‘Number in Arabic’, published in the collective handbook on Number in the World’s Languages, 2022, edited by Paolo Acquaviva & Michael Daniel, de Gruyter Mouton.

His article ‘Hidden Trilogies of Universal Quantifiers: A Syntactically Based Analysis of Arabic Kull and Its Kins’, published in Studia Linguistica in 2020 establishes a three-way ambiguity of the Arabic universal quantifier kull, paralleling the three universal English quantifiers all, every, and each, via feature syntax, and semantic number and maximality interpretation (or ‘definiteness’).

Few years before, his 2018 book, Constructing Feminine to Mean established firm comparative and theoretical of how to analyze the various distributions of Gender across categories and uses in Arabic and other languages, including its numeral classifier use in numerals, its partitioning-singulative use in nominals, its evaluative use in clauses, in addition to formal and semantic uses in other nominals.

His seminal article on ‘Agreement, Binding, and Coherence’, published in 1988 in a collective volume on Agreement in Natural Language, edited by Michael Barlow & Charles Ferguson, Stanford: CSLI remains a leading reference to understand the mechanisms behind variation in agreement configurations and features, and changes in word order and their motivation.

=== Complementizer, Determiner, and Tense (CP, DP, and TP) ===
Fassi Fehri (1987, 1993, 2002) was among the first to have contributed to generalize head movement from V to T to N to D by showing that the same syntactic mechanism that raises V to T in the clause also raises N to D in the noun phrase. He explicitly argued that DPs have a functional spine which is parallel to CP/TP, and that construct-state phenomena are parallel to verbal higher inflection distributions and movement, Arabic being a ‘synthetic’ language where lexical heads raise to higher functional heads in a motivated cartography.

Fassi Fehri’s contribution to the CP hypothesis is foundational in the development of a richly articulated, cartographic left periphery for Arabic, as acknowledged in early work by Kayne (1983), Connecteness and Binary Branching. Foris, and Chomsky (1995), The Minimalist Program, The MIT Press, based on his article ‘Some Complement Phenomena in Arabic, Lexical Grammar, the Complementizer Phrase Hypothesis, and the Non-accessibility condition’, and his book 1982, Linguistique arabe: forme et interpretation, Ch.III. He also showed that Modality in Arabic is higher than TP or VP, and partly encoded in the CP layer.

=== Language policy, linguistic justice, and terminology ===
Alongside theoretical linguistics, Fassi Fehri has written about the status and development of Arabic as a modern language. His work in this area addresses language planning, terminology, Arabization and the relationship between Arabic and other languages in education and public life. His book Al-Siyāsa al-Lughawiyya fī al-Bilād al-ʿArabiyya (Language Policy in the Arab Countries) was published in Arabic in 2013. It addresses language policy in Arab countries and considers questions concerning the development and institutional use of Arabic. The work is cited in the Cambridge Handbook of Arabic Linguistics in discussions of Arabic language planning.

Fassi Fehri’s model of linguistic justice is presented in his book 2019, which aims at providing objective criteria for distributing fairly linguistic rights and duties in multilingual societies, and specifically the Arabic linguistic society. It builds on (a) a normative component, with ethical and political principles guiding language policy (territoriality, personhood, universality, equity, and efficiency), (b) an institutional l component, that is, structures, laws, and governance mechanisms that translate those principles into practice (regulation, planning, legislation, governance), and (c) an operational component, or the concrete implementation of language policies in education, administration, media, and public life (functional allocation, organized multilingualism, fair standardization), etc. He applied this model concretely to the Moroccan lcomplex inguistic situation.

His work on linguistic terminology came in 2009, when he published A Lexicon of Linguistic Terms: English, French, Arabic, a trilingual reference work (with the collaboration of Nadia Aamiri), Beyrut: Dar al-Kitab al-Jadid. The work contains more than 400 pages and brings together terminology in English, French and Arabic. Library records describe it as a work resulting from years of teaching, research, and practical work in linguistics in Moroccan universities.

== Recent research ==
Fassi Fehri continued publishing on Arabic morphology, syntax and semantics, and his research has focused on root-based lexical representations, templatization, categorization, and variation, addressing event structure, argument structure, number and the interfaces between the lexicon and grammar, along the study of the faculty of language and cognition.In 2024, he co-authored with Maather al-Rawii in Frontiers in Language Sciences a study on the syntax of Arabic prepositional phrases. The article proposed a fine-grained structural analysis of spatial prepositions and argued for a distinction between lexical/root material and functional or categorial structure in the structure of PPs.

In 2025, he co-authored, with Sameerah Saeed and Bashayer Alotaibi, ‘Rooted Motion Events in a Distributed Model of the Arabic Lexicon’, published in Studia Linguistica. The article analyzed Arabic motion events through root classes and event composition rather than relying primarily on conventional verbal-class distinctions. He also contributed a chapter on ‘Arabic comparatives, gradation and variation’ to The Ziggurat of Grammar: In Honor of Ur Shlonsky, published in 2025.

His continuing work on Arabic and Semitic lexical structure has also been reflected in organizing international scholarly workshops. He was a convenor, with Peter Hallman, of workshops on the Arabic/Semitic lexicon at meetings of the Societas Linguistica Europaea, including the first workshop on ‘The New Arabic/Semitic Lexicon’ at Helsinki, August 2024 and the second workshop on the same theme in Osnabrück, August 2026.

== Awards and honors ==
Fassi Fehri received the Highest Merit Award of Science and Culture of Morocco and the Chevalier Medal in 1992, according to the King Faisal Prize's biographical record.

In 2006, he received the King Faisal Prize for Arabic Language and Literature for his contributions to the study of the Arabic language within modern linguistic theory.

== Selected publications ==
- Complémentation et anaphore en arabe moderne: une approche lexicale fonctionnelle — doctoral dissertation, University of Paris III, 1981.
- Linguistique arabe: forme et interprétation — 1982.
- Allisaniyaat —1985
- Al-mucjam l-arabii—1986.
- Issues in the Structure of Arabic Clauses and Words — Kluwer Academic, 1993.
- Al-Muʿjam wa-al-Tawsīṭ: Naẓarāt Jadīda fī Qaḍāyā al-Lugha al-ʿArabiyya — 1997.
- A Lexicon of Linguistic Terms: English, French, Arabic — 2009.
- Key Features and Parameters in Arabic Grammar — John Benjamins, 2012.
- Al-Siyāsa al-Lughawiyya fī al-Bilād al-ʿArabiyya (Language Policy in the Arab Countries) — 2013.
- Number and Gender Convergence: The Arabic Plurative — 2020.
- Hidden Trilogies of Universal Quantifiers: A Syntactically Based Analysis of Arabic Kull and Its Kins — 2020.
- al-mucjam l-carabii t-tanawwucii, 2021
- The New Arabic Lexicon and Its Words: Root-Based and Templatic Morphosyntax — John Benjamins, 2026.
