= Heidi Harley =

American linguist (born 1969)

Heidi B. Harley
- Born: September 26, 1969 (age 57); Oregon

Academic background
- Education: Memorial University of Newfoundland B.A.; MIT Ph.D.
- Thesis: Subjects, events, and licensing (1995)
- Doctoral advisor: Alec Marantz

Academic work
- Discipline: Linguistics
- Sub-discipline: morphology; Syntax; Distributed Morphology
- Institutions: University of Arizona
- Website: heidiharley.com

Heidi Britton Harley (born September 26, 1969) is an American linguist and professor of linguistics at the University of Arizona. Her areas of specialization are formal syntactic theory, morphology, and lexical semantics.

== Career ==
Harley was born in Oregon, but was raised in St. John's, Newfoundland. She earned her B.A. in Linguistics and English at Memorial University of Newfoundland in 1991. She received her Ph.D. in Linguistics and Philosophy in 1995 from Massachusetts Institute of Technology, under the supervision of Alec Marantz.

Harley is one of the main researchers working in the theory of Distributed morphology. She has published over thirty articles on morphological theory, syntax, and semantics, including articles in the journals Language, Linguistic Inquiry, Lingua, Morphology Yearbook, and Studia Linguistica. She is the editor of three volumes of collected papers, the editor of two special issues of journals, and the author of a textbook on morphological theory (Harley 2005).

== Honors ==
The Linguistic Society of America (LSA) has named Harley as one of the 2019 LSA Fellows, a group whose membership is determined by their "distinguished contributions to the discipline". She was elected Vice-President/President-Elect of the LSA for 2024 and is serving as President of the society for 2025.

She taught at the 2015 Linguistic Summer Institute organized by the LSA. She has been an invited teacher at other major summer schools in linguistics throughout the world, including Ireland and Brazil.

== Specializations ==
- Syntax
- Distributed morphology
- Argument structure
- Lexical semantics

== Selected publications ==
- Heidi Harley. 1995. Subjects, Events and Licensing. PhD Dissertation, MIT.
- Heidi Harley and Rolf Noyer. 1999. Distributed morphology. Glot International, Volume 4, Issue 4, April 1999.
- Andrew Carnie, Heidi Harley, and MaryAnn Willie, eds. 2003. Formal Approaches to Function: In Honor of Eloise Jelinek, John Benjamins Publishers. ISBN 9781588113481
- Andrew Carnie, Sheila Dooley, and Heidi Harley. 2005. Verb First: On the Syntax of Verb-Initial Languages, John Benjamins. ISBN 9781588116109
- Heidi Harley. 2005. English Words. Blackwell Publishers. ISBN 978-0631230328
- Daniel Siddiqi and Heidi Harley, eds. 2016. Morphological Metatheory. Amsterdam: Benjamins. doi:10.1075/la.229 ISBN 9789027267122
