= Arabic compound =

Aspect of Arabic grammar

Arabic compound formation refers to the process of combining two or more words into a single unit of meaning in Arabic. In linguistic terms, a compound is formed when independent lexemes are joined to create a new word or fixed expression that conveys a specific concept. Compounding is one of the methods of word formation in Arabic morphology, alongside the root-and-pattern derivation system. Historically, compounding was relatively limited in Classical Arabic, but it has become more common in Modern Standard Arabic (MSA) for coining new terms and loan translations, especially in technical and contemporary contexts. In the Arabic grammatical tradition, scholars use the term (tarkīb) broadly for combining words, and distinguish it from (naḥt), which specifically refers to "blending" parts of words into a single word.

In Arabic grammar, compounds (murakkab) formation follows identifiable structural and semantic patterns, such as construct relations (iḍāfa) and fixed pairings. They reflect properties of Arabic morphology and word order. Research on Arabic compounding examines the interaction of morphology, semantics, and syntax in these structures.

== Structure ==
Arabic compounds typically consist of a head, the main element carrying the core meaning, and one or more modifiers that restrict or specify that meaning. Unlike English compounds (which are usually right-headed), Arabic compounds are often left-headed, which means the first element functions as the head in most cases. For example, in the compound raʾs–māl (Arabic: رأس مال, "capital" meaning wealth), the first element raʾs ("head") is the syntactic head and the second māl ("money") specifies the kind of "head" (in this case, "principal money"). Compounded terms in Arabic behave as single lexical units: they can take inflections (such as plural or definiteness) as a whole and are interpreted as one single concept. Order varies by subtype, though many patterns place the head before its modifiers. In MSA, some descriptions group compounds into four types. With respect to headedness, proposals note that N+N compounds (except specific–general constructions), Adj+Adj compounds, and reduplicative formations may be semantically dual-headed or show no clear head.

=== Syntactic classification ===
Modern linguistic analyses have identified several structural patterns of compounding in Arabic, especially in MSA and some dialects. The major types include:

1. Noun-Noun Compounds: This type of compound involves two nouns, where one noun serves as the head and the other as the modifier. For example, "معلمو+الفيزياء" (muʕallim-uu + l-fiizyaaʔ) meaning "the physics teachers."
2. Verb-Noun Compounds: These compounds combine a verb with a noun, where the verb typically functions as the modifier specifying the action or quality associated with the noun. For instance, "تدريب+القيادة" (tadriːb + al.qiˈjæːda) meaning "driving training."
3. Adjective-Noun Compounds: Adjective-noun compounds involve the combination where an adjective modifies a noun. This construction can be found in Modern Standard Arabic (MSA), as well as in other Arabic dialects. In MSA, examples of such combinations like "خفيف+الظل" (xafiif + ðˤ-ðˤill) meaning "a funny person."
4. Verb-Verb Compounds: In addition to noun-based compounds, Arabic, particularly Jordanian Arabic (JA), includes compounds created by joining two verbs. The verbs can either denote simultaneous actions, sequential actions, or actions that complement each other to convey a particular concept. An example of this type of compound in JA is "قام+وقف" (ga:m + waggaf), meaning "rose and stood up." (Note: In this compound, both verbs are closely related in meaning and jointly describe an action. For instance: "علي قام وقف لما أبوه إجا" (In English: Ali rose and stood up when his father came). This compound illustrates how two actions, rising and standing up, are performed simultaneously, conveying a unified action. Despite the absence of an explicit coordinator between the verbs, the compound effectively communicates the intended meaning, suggesting a seamless transition from one action to another. Similarly, English also employs such compounds, as seen in phrases like "crash and land," where two actions are combined to depict a coherent event.)

Linguistic studies of Arabic have shown that MSA has four main compounding patterns, while some dialects have a subset of these (e.g., one less pattern in Jordanian Arabic). In particular, a type of preposition–preposition compound found in MSA (two prepositions used together as an idiomatic phrase) is said to be absent in Jordanian Arabic. In terms of internal structure, compounds in Arabic can sometimes semantically be double-headed or headless. That is, in some formations (such as some N+N compounds outside the simple genitive construct, Adj+Adj compounds, or reduplicated forms), neither component clearly dominates meaning, or both contribute equally. Arabic compounding exhibits a range of patterns beyond the typical noun+noun iḍāfa construction.

== Semantic functions ==
Compounding in Arabic serves several semantic and functional purposes within the language:

- Specification: Many Arabic compounds provide a more precise description of an entity by combining terms that narrow each other's meaning. The first element often restricts or classifies the category of the second element. For example, the word bayt ("house") on its own is general, but in a compound like bayt al-ḍayf (بيت الضيف, "guest house"), the addition of al-ḍayf ("the guest") specifies a particular kind of house.
- Attribution and Nuance: Compounds can modify the meaning of a main noun by adding descriptive or idiomatic connotations. This combination often produces a meaning that goes beyond the literal sum of the parts. For instance, istiqbāl ḥār (استقبال حار) literally means "hot/warm reception", and as a compound it conveys the figurative sense of a "warm welcome" (a very enthusiastic or friendly reception). Here ḥār ("hot") modifies istiqbāl ("reception") to add an emotional connotation rather than a physical temperature.
- Denotation of complex concepts: Arabic compounds often refer to complex concepts that may require a longer explanation. By combining several morphemes or words, a single compound can effectively convey a concept that is difficult to express in a simple word. This is seen in technical or loan-translated terms; for example, lā-markaziyya (لا مركزية, "decentralization") is formed from lā "no/not" + markaziyya "centralization," literally "non-centralization," to denote a political concept. Similarly, kīs al-hawāʾ (كيس الهواء, "air bag") combines kīs "bag" and hawāʾ "air" to name an object (an airbag) that didn't exist in Classical times.

== Linguistic significance ==
Grammar contributes to the enrichment of the lexicon. It enables the Arabic language to generate new vocabulary by incorporating existing words or roots into new terms. This process works in conjunction with derivational morphology to keep the language abreast of new concepts and technologies. From a semantic and cognitive perspective, analyzing Arabic grammar helps researchers understand how native speakers encode relationships between concepts. For example, identifying the head element and how modifiers constrain meaning allows for a deeper understanding of the semantic structures and mental processing of complex words. Comparative studies have also highlighted cross-linguistic insights: Arabic compounds share many of the same conceptual relationship types observed in compounding in other languages (such as English), but they differ in headedness direction. Understanding this difference in head direction has implications for syntactic theory and how compounding is treated in Semitic languages versus Indo-European languages.

Contemporary linguists, such as Abdel Rahman Altakhaineh, have applied frameworks like Relational Morphology (a theory from Jackendoff's Parallel Architecture) to Arabic compounding. This approach treats compounds as constructions generated by schema rather than strict syntactic derivations. The findings suggest that both lexicalized compounds (fixed expressions stored in the lexicon) and novel compounds produced on the fly can be interpreted under the same relational schema in Arabic. In other words, speakers use a general compound-building pattern to form new compounds, similar to how they understand established ones.

== Bibliography ==
- Reda, Ali. المرجع في اللغة العربية نحوها وصرفها (in Arabic). ISBN 9789953610016.
- Aoun, Joseph E.; Benmamoun, Elabbas; Choueiri, Lina (2009). The Syntax of Arabic. Cambridge Syntax Guides. Cambridge: Cambridge University Press. ISBN 978-0-521-65017-5.
- Bassiouney, Reem. "Arabic Language and Linguistics". press.georgetown.edu – via Georgetown University Press.
- Comrie, Bernard. Perspectives on Arabic Linguistics. John Benjamins Publishing Company. ISBN 978-90-272-3577-0.
- Habash, Nizar Y. (2010). "Introduction to Arabic Natural Language Processing". Synthesis Lectures on Human Language Technologies. doi:10.1007/978-3-031-02139-8. ISBN 978-3-031-01011-8. ISSN 1947-4040.
- "A Frequency Dictionary of Arabic: Core Vocabulary for Learners". Routledge & CRC Press.
- Al-Bataineh, Hussein; Branigan, Phil. "The syntax of (complex) numerals in Arabic". Memorial University of Newfoundland.
- Watson, Janet (11 April 2002). "The Phonology And Morphology Of Arabic". academic.oup.com. Oxford University Press. doi:10.1093/oso/9780199257591.001.0001. ISBN 9781383039887.
- Sanni, Amidu O. (26 October 2015). "Kees Versteegh, The Arabic Language, Edinburgh, Edinburgh University Press, 2014, in Muslim World Book Review, Vol 35, no 4, 2015, pp. 29-31". Brill Publishers.
