= Subordination (linguistics) =

Principle of the hierarchical organization of linguistic units

In linguistics, subordination is a principle of the hierarchical organization of linguistic units. While the principle is applicable in semantics, morphology, and phonology, most work in linguistics employs the term "subordination" in the context of syntax, and that is the context in which it is considered here. The syntactic units of sentences are often either subordinate or coordinate to each other. Hence an understanding of subordination is promoted by an understanding of coordination, and vice versa.

== Subordinate clauses ==
Subordination as a concept of syntactic organization is associated closely with the distinction between coordinate and subordinate clauses. One clause is subordinate to another if it depends on it. The dependent clause is called a subordinate clause and the independent clause is called the main clause (= matrix clause). Subordinate clauses are usually introduced by subordinators (= subordinate conjunctions) such as after, because, before, if, so that, that, when, while, etc. For example:

Before we play again, we should do our homework.
We are doing our homework now because we want to play again.

The strings in bold are subordinate clauses, and the strings in non-bold are the main clauses. Sentences must consist of at least one main clause, whereas the number of subordinate clauses is hypothetically without limitation. Long sentences that contain many subordinate clauses are characterized in terms of hypotaxis, the Greek term meaning the grammatical arrangement of "unequal" constructs (hypo="beneath", taxis="arrangement"). Sentences that contain few or no subordinate clauses but that may contain coordinated clauses are characterized in terms of parataxis.

== Heads and dependents ==
In a broader sense, subordination is a relation existing between two syntactic units, whereby the one unit is subordinate to the other and the latter is superordinate to the former. An adjective that modifies a noun is subordinate to the noun and the noun is superordinate to the adjective; a noun phrase (NP) that is the complement of a preposition is subordinate to the preposition and the preposition is superordinate to the NP; a prepositional phrase (PP) that modifies a verb phrase (VP) is subordinate to the VP and the VP is superordinate to the PP; etc. The subordinate unit is called the dependent, and the superordinate unit the head. Thus anytime two syntactic units are in a head-dependent relationship, subordination obtains. For example:

black dog
with patience
clean the bathroom

The word in bold in each case is dependent on the other word, which is its head. Subordination in this sense should be compared with coordination. Two units or more are coordinate to each other if there is no hierarchical relation between them and they have equal functional status, e.g.

[black] and [brown] dog
with [love] and [patience]
clean [the bathroom] and [the kitchen]

The words in brackets are coordinate to each other, and both coordinates are subordinate to the word that is not enclosed in brackets. Note that the coordinated units are not organized hierarchically but are organized linearly, the one preceding the other.

== Representing subordination and coordination ==
Most theories of syntax represent subordination (and coordination) in terms of tree structures. A head is positioned above its dependents in the tree, so that it immediately dominates them. One of two competing principles is employed to construct the trees: either the constituency relation of phrase structure grammars or the dependency relation of dependency grammars. Both principles are illustrated here with the following trees. The a-trees on the left illustrate constituency, and the b-trees on the right dependency:

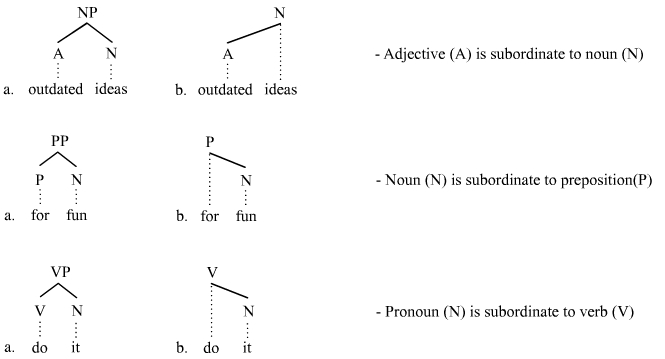

Constituency shows subordination by way of projections. One of the two words projects its category status up to the root node of the entire structure and is therefore the head of the structure. Dependency also shows subordination, but it does so with fewer nodes in the tree. The head directly dominates its dependent. The trees illustrating subordination can be compared with trees illustrating coordination. There are various proposals concerning the tree representations of coordinate structures. The following trees are just suggestive in that regard. The constituency relation is again shown in the a-trees on the left, and the dependency relation in the b-trees on the right:

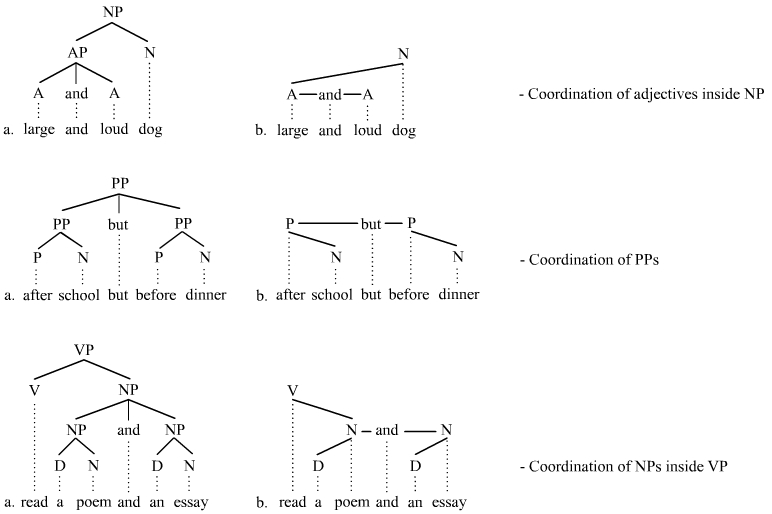

The constituency trees show that both parts of the coordinate structure project up to the root node of the entire tree, and the dependency trees illustrate that each word again projects just a single node. Both representation formats illustrate the equal status of the coordinated units insofar as they are placed on the same level; they are equi-level. From an organizational point of view, subordination is grouping words together in such a manner that includes hierarchical and linear order, and coordination is grouping words together only in terms of linear order.

== Sources ==
- Ágel, V., Ludwig Eichinger, Hans-Werner Eroms, Peter Hellwig, Hans Heringer, and Hennig Lobin (eds.) 2003/6. Dependency and Valency: An International Handbook of Contemporary Research. Berlin: Walter de Gruyter.
- Chisholm, W. 1981. Elements of English linguistics. New York: Longman.
- Hudson, R. 1988. Coordination and grammatical relations. Journal of Linguistics 24,303–342.
- Hudson, R. 1989. Gapping and grammatical relations. Linguistics 25, 57–94.
- Osborne, T. 2006. Parallel conjuncts. Studia Linguistica 60, 1, 64-96.
- Sag, I., G. Gazdar, T. Wasow, and S. Weisler 1985. Coordination and how to distinguish categories. Natural Language and Linguistic Theory 3, 117–171.
