= Lina Choueiri =

American linguist

- لينا شويري
- Born: Mansourieh, Lebanon
- Education: University of Southern California (PhD, 2002) Georgetown University (MSc, 1993) Université Saint-Joseph de Beyrouth (BA, 1991) American University of Beirut (BSc, 1989)

Lina Choueiri (Transcription:/li:na shuejri/ - Arabic: لينا شويري) is a Lebanese associate professor in linguistics at the American University of Beirut (AUB). She was the chairperson of the department of English from 2006 to 2009. Choueiri has been serving as AUB's first deputy provost since July 2021.

Her research in Syntax mainly focuses on Lebanese Arabic and related Semitic languages. She works within the generative framework.

== Early life and education ==
Lina Choueiri was born in Mansourieh, Lebanon. After obtaining her French baccalaureate, she pursued two undergraduate studies concurrently: Mathematics at the American University of Beirut (BSc, 1989) and French literature at Université Saint-Joseph de Beyrouth (BA, 1991). She continued her education in the United States. Choueiri earned her master's degree in linguistics from Georgetown University in 1993 followed by a PhD in linguistics from the University of Southern California in 2002.

== Research ==
Within the study of grammar in the Generative linguistics approach, Choueiri's research interests follow three lines of inquiry:

1. the application of formal grammars to the study of human language,
2. the comparative syntax of Semitic languages, and
3. the status of the syntactic component of the grammar with respect to the other components (i.e. phonological and semantic).

The empirical domain of her research revolves around the notion of 'displacement' and the relationship between pronouns and their antecedents in constructions like questions and relative clauses. Some of her recent publications are articles in Natural Language and Linguistic Theory, Linguistic Inquiry, and the Encyclopedia of Arabic Language and Linguistics. The Syntax of Arabic, which she co-authored with Joseph Aoun and Elabbas Benmamoun, was published by Cambridge University Press. She had been a faculty member in the English Department, at AUB, and a member of CELRT since fall 2000.

== Selected publications ==
Books

- El Cheikh, N. M., Choueiri, L., & Orfali, B. (Eds.). (2016). One hundred and fifty. AUB Press. ISBN 9789953586274
- Aoun, J. E., Benmaamoun, E., & Choueiri, L. (2010). The syntax of Arabic. Cambridge University Press. ISBN 0-521-65986-8

Papers and chapters

- Aoun, Joseph and Lina Choueiri - 1999 - "Modes of Interrogation". In Perspectives on Arabic Linguistics, Benmamoun, Elabbas (ed.), 7 ff.
- J Aoun, L Choueiri, N Hornstein - 2001 - Resumption, Movement, and Derivational Economy - Linguistic Inquiry - MIT Press
- J Aoun, L Choueiri - 2000 - Epithets - Natural Language & Linguistic Theory - Springer
