= Etymological calque =

Lexical item replicating the etymology of a foreign lexical item

In linguistics, an etymological calque is a lexical item calqued from another language by replicating the etymology of the borrowed lexical item although this etymology is irrelevant for the meaning being borrowed.

Most calques are not etymological. For example, the English compound basketball was calqued, conventionally, into Standard Chinese as 篮球 lánqiú, which means "basketball". The lexical item 篮球 lánqiú consists of 篮 lán "basket" and 球 qiú "ball". Therefore, lánqiú is a calque. On the other hand, the English compound hotdog was etymologically calqued into Standard Chinese as 热狗 règǒu "hotdog". The Chinese lexical item 热狗 règǒu "hotdog" consists of 热 rè "hot" and 狗 gǒu "dog", and is thus an etymological calque of the English lexical item hotdog. Those making the calque (as well as Chinese speakers) are completely aware that when they eat a 热狗 règǒu "hotdog" they do not eat dog meat. Nonetheless, they chose to retain the English etymology within the Chinese neologism. Therefore, règǒu is an etymological calque.

== Examples ==
=== Standard Chinese ===
The etymology of the English lexical item cocktail is maintained and visible within the Chinese etymological calque 鸡尾酒 jīwěijiǔ "cocktail". The Chinese lexical item 鸡尾酒 jīwěijiǔ "cocktail" means literally "chicken tail alcohol", and is thus an etymological calque of the English lexical item cocktail.

=== Israeli Hebrew ===
Hemda Ben-Yehuda’s 1904 neologism אופנה ofná "fashion" is an etymological calque - deriving from אופן ófen "mode" – of the internationalism móda "fashion" (e.g. moda in Italian), which can be traced back to the Latin lexical item modus "mode".

== See also ==
- Phono-semantic matching
