= Andrew Carnie =

Canadian professor of linguistics

- Born: April 19, 1969 (age 57); Calgary, Alberta, Canada

Academic background
- Education: University of Toronto B.A. (Hons), Massachusetts Institute of Technology (Ph.D.)
- Doctoral advisor: Kenneth Hale

Academic work
- Discipline: Linguistics

Andrew Carnie (born April 19, 1969) is a Canadian linguist and professor of linguistics at the University of Arizona. He is the author or coauthor of nine books and has papers published on formal syntactic theory and on linguistic aspects of Scottish Gaelic and Irish Gaelic. From 2010-2012, he worked as the faculty director of the University of Arizona's Graduate Interdisciplinary Programs. In August 2012, he was appointed interim Dean of the graduate college. From 2013-2022, he worked as the Vice Provost for Graduate Education and Dean of the Graduate College. In that role he founded the University's Graduate Center, established the university's Graduate faculty, significantly increased student diversity, and worked to establish better working conditions and wages for students.

Carnie was born in Calgary, Alberta and is a teacher of Balkan and international folk dance. In 2009, he was named Linguist of the Day by The Linguist List.

== Work ==
The bulk of Carnie's research has been in the fields of syntax, morphology, and phonology. He works primarily on the Celtic Languages, particularly Irish and Scottish Gaelic.

== Books ==
- Proceedings of the 18th West Coast Conference on Formal Linguistics, Cascadilla Press, 1999 (with Sonya Bird, Jason Haugen, and Peter Norquest)
- The Syntax of Verb Initial Languages, Oxford University Press, 2000 (with Eithne Guilfoyle)
- Papers in Honor of Ken Hale (MITELF1), MITWPL, 2000 (with Eloise Jelinek and MaryAnn Willie)
- Syntax: A Generative Introduction, Blackwell Publishers, 2002
- Formal Approaches to Function: In honor of Eloise Jelinek, John Benjamins Publishers, 2003, (with Heidi Harley and MaryAnn Willie)
- Verb First: On the Syntax of Verb Initial Languages, John Benjamins Publishers, 2005, (with Heidi Harley and Sheila Dooley)
- Syntax: A Generative Introduction: Second Edition. Wiley-Blackwell, 2006
- Constituent Structure, Oxford University Press, 2008
- Irish Nouns, Oxford University Press, 2008
- Constituent Structure, 2nd Edition, Oxford University Press, 2010
- Modern Syntax: A Course Book, Cambridge University Press, 2011.
- Formal Approaches to Celtic Linguistics. Cambridge Scholars Press, 2011
- Syntax: A Generative Introduction: Third Edition. Wiley-Blackwell, 2013
- The Routledge Handbook of Syntax (editor), Routledge, 2014
- Syntax: A Generative Introduction: Fourth Edition. Wiley-Blackwell, 2021
