= Bracketing paradox =

Paradox in linguistic morphology

In linguistic morphology, the bracketing paradox concerns morphologically complex words which have more than one analysis, or bracketing, e.g., one for phonology and one for semantics, and the two are not compatible, or brackets do not align.

== English examples ==
=== Comparatives such as unhappier ===
One type of a bracketing paradox found in English is exemplified by words like unhappier or uneasier. The synthetic comparative suffix -er generally occurs with monosyllabic adjectives and a small class of disyllabic adjectives with the primary (and only) stress on the first syllable. Other adjectives take the analytic comparative more. Thus, we have older and grumpier, but more correct and more restrictive. From a phonological perspective, this suggests that a word like uneasier must be formed by combining the suffix er with the adjective easy, since uneasy is a three syllable word:

$$\Big[\mbox{un-}\Big] \Big[ \big[\mbox{easi}\big] \big[\mbox{-er}\big] \Big]$$

However, uneasier means "more uneasy", not "not more easy". Thus, from a semantic perspective, uneasier must be a combination of er with the adjective uneasy:

$$\Big [ \big[\mbox{un-}\big] \big[\mbox{easi}\big] \Big ] \Big[\mbox{-er}\Big]$$

This, however, violates the morphophonological rules for the suffix -er. Phenomena such as this have been argued to represent a mismatch between different levels of grammatical structure.

=== Professions such as nuclear physicist ===
Another type of English bracketing paradox is found in compound words that are a name for a professional of a particular discipline, preceded by a modifier that narrows that discipline: nuclear physicist, historical linguist, political scientist, etc. Taking nuclear physicist as an example, we see that there are at least two reasonable ways that the compound word can be bracketed (ignoring the fact that nuclear itself is morphologically complex):

1. $\Big [ \mbox{nuclear} \Big ] \Big [ \big [ \mbox{physic(s)} \big ] \big [\mbox{-ist} \big ] \Big ]$ – one who studies physics, and who happens also to be nuclear (phonological bracketing)
2. $\Big[ \big [\mbox{nuclear} \big] \big [\mbox{physic(s)} \big] \Big] \Big [\mbox{-ist} \Big]$ – one who studies nuclear physics, a subfield of physics that deals with nuclear phenomena (semantic bracketing)

What is interesting to many morphologists about this type of bracketing paradox in English is that the correct bracketing 2 (correct in the sense that this is the way that a native speaker would understand it) does not follow the usual bracketing pattern 1 typical for most compound words in English.

== Proposed solutions ==
=== Raising ===
Pesetsky (1985) accounts for the bracketing paradox by proposing that phonological bracketing occurs in syntax and semantic bracketing occurs after the output is sent to LF. This solution is parallel to quantifier raising. For example, the sentence: Every farmer owns a donkey has two interpretations:

1. Every farmer owns their own donkey: ∀x[farmer(x) → ∃y[donkey(y) ∧ own(x,y)] ]
2. There exists one donkey such that every farmer owns it: ∃y[donkey(y) ∧ ∀x[farmer(x) → own(x,y)] ]
- The structure for 1 is: [_{IP} [_{DP1} every farmer ] [ [_{DP2} a donkey ] [t_{1} [_{VP} owns t_{2} ] ] ] ]
- The structure for 2 is: [_{IP} [_{DP2} a donkey ] [ [_{DP1} every farmer ] [t_{1} [_{VP} owns t_{2} ] ] ] ]

Depending on which quantifier expression is higher, the meaning is shifted, but because this movement does not occur until LF, the structures are pronounced identically. Similarly to this account for scopal ambiguity in quantifier raising, Pesetsky proposes that in the structure of unhappier, happy and the comparative suffix -er are the first to combine, since -er may not attach to adjectives that are longer than two syllables. It is then fed to PF before the next phase, at which the negative prefix un- is then attached. At LF in the following phase, -er undergoes raising, forcing the interpretation of the word to be "more unhappy" and not "not happier".

Syntax: [ un [ happy er ] ] → LF: [ [ un [ happy t_{1} ] ] er_{1} ]

=== Late adjunction ===
An alternative account is proposed by Newell (2005). She argues that un- adjoins at a late stage of the derivation in LF, possibly after the spell-out of [happy -er]. Under this interpretation the stages are:

Syntax: [ happy er ] → Late Insertion: [ [ un happy ] er ]

Contrasting with un-, the prefix in-, which also has negative meaning, is not allowed at late insertion. There are various pieces of evidence that in- is closer to the root.

1. Selectional Restrictions: in- may only combine with Latinate roots, while un- is nonrestrictive
2. Bound Morphemes: in- attaches to some bound morphemes, while un- only attaches to free morphemes (inept → *ept, inane → *ane)
3. Nasal Assimilation: in- assimilates phonologically with the first phoneme of the morpheme to which it attaches, whereas the /n/ in un- is preserved
  1. Impossible: /in-/ + /ˈpasɪbl̩/ → [imˈpʰasɪbl̩] (*[inˈpʰasɪbl̩])
  2. Unpopular: /un-/ + /ˈpɒpjulr̩/ → [unˈpʰˈɒpjulr̩] (*[umˈpʰˈɒpjulr̩])

In order to participate in these processes, in- must attach at an earlier level directly to the root in order to adjectivize it. Thus, because it attaches early, if it creates a three-syllable word, -er may not attach, as -er attaches at a later stage above the root derivation.

- [ [ in √polite ] -er ] → crashes at PF

=== Glomming ===
A famous bracketing paradox of Russian verb complex such as razorvala 'she ripped apart' shows different phonological and semantic analyses:

razo rv a la
PFX Root THEME 3SG.PST.F

- morphophonology – [prefix [root suffixes] ]
- morphosemantics – [ [prefix root] suffixes]

One of the proposed solutions is parallel to the proposal for Navajo verbs with multiple prefixes. It includes head movement and Merger Under Adjacency, also called Glomming. For Russian, the derivation starts with [_{TP} T [_{AspP} Asp [_{vP} v [_{VP} √V [_{SC} LP DP_{obj}]]]]] It allows for the semantic bracketing as √V and LP are next to each other. Next, √V rv merges with v –a via head movement and further v complex merges with Asp also via head movement. Lexical Prefix razo- is phrasal and does not participate in the head movement. Thus, the complex structure emerging as a result of head movement to the exclusion of LP allows for the phonological bracketing. Finally, Glomming or Merger Under Adjacency takes place resulting in one verbal complex.

== See also ==
- List of paradoxes
