= Bracketing (linguistics) =

In linguistics, particularly linguistic morphology, a bracketing is a representation of an utterance as a hierarchical tree of constituent parts. Analysis techniques based on bracketing are used at different levels of grammar, but are particularly associated with morphologically complex words.

To give an example of bracketing in English, consider the word uneventful. This word is made of three parts, the prefix un-, the root event, and the suffix -ful. An English speaker should have no trouble parsing this word as "lacking in significant events". However, imagine a foreign linguist with access to a dictionary of English roots and affixes, but only a superficial understanding of English grammar. Conceivably, he or she could understand uneventful as one of:

- "not eventful", where eventful in turn means "full of events"
- "full of unevents", where unevent in turn means "something different from or opposite to an event"

We can represent these two understandings of uneventful with the bracketings $\left[ [ \mbox{un-} ] \left[ [ \mbox{event} ] [ \mbox{-ful} ] \right] \right]$ and $\left[ \left[ [ \mbox{un-} ] [ \mbox{event} ] \right] [ \mbox{-ful} ] \right]$, respectively. Here, bracketing gives the linguist a convenient technique for representing the different ways to parse the word, and for forming hypotheses about why the word is parsed the way it is by speakers of the language.

Since bracketing represents a hierarchical tree, it is associated to some extent with generative grammar. Some theories in cognitive linguistics rely on the idea that bracketing represents to some degree of accuracy how listeners parse complex utterances (e.g. level ordering). In computational linguistics, rules for how a program should parse a word can be represented in terms of possible bracketings.

It is not completely clear that bracketing accurately represents the structure of utterances. In particular, there are bracketing paradoxes that challenge this idea. However, there is some evidence for bracketing, such as the creation of new words via rebracketing.

== Rebracketing ==
Rebracketing is a type of folk etymology that can result in the creation of new words. An often cited example in English is certain common nicknames that begin with N, where the given name does not begin with N (e.g. Ned for Edward, Nelly for Ellen). In Old English, the first person possessive pronoun was mīn. Old English speakers commonly addressed family and close friends with "min <Name>", for example, "min Ed". Over time, the pronoun shifted from min to mi and children learning the language rebracketed the utterance /mined/ from the original "min Ed" ($\left[ [ \mbox{min} ] [ \mbox{ed} ] \right]$) to "mi Ned" ($\left[ [ \mbox{mi} ] [ \mbox{ned} ] \right]$). A similar process is responsible for the word "nickname".

== See also ==
- Bracketing paradox
