= Alec Marantz =

American linguist (born 1959)

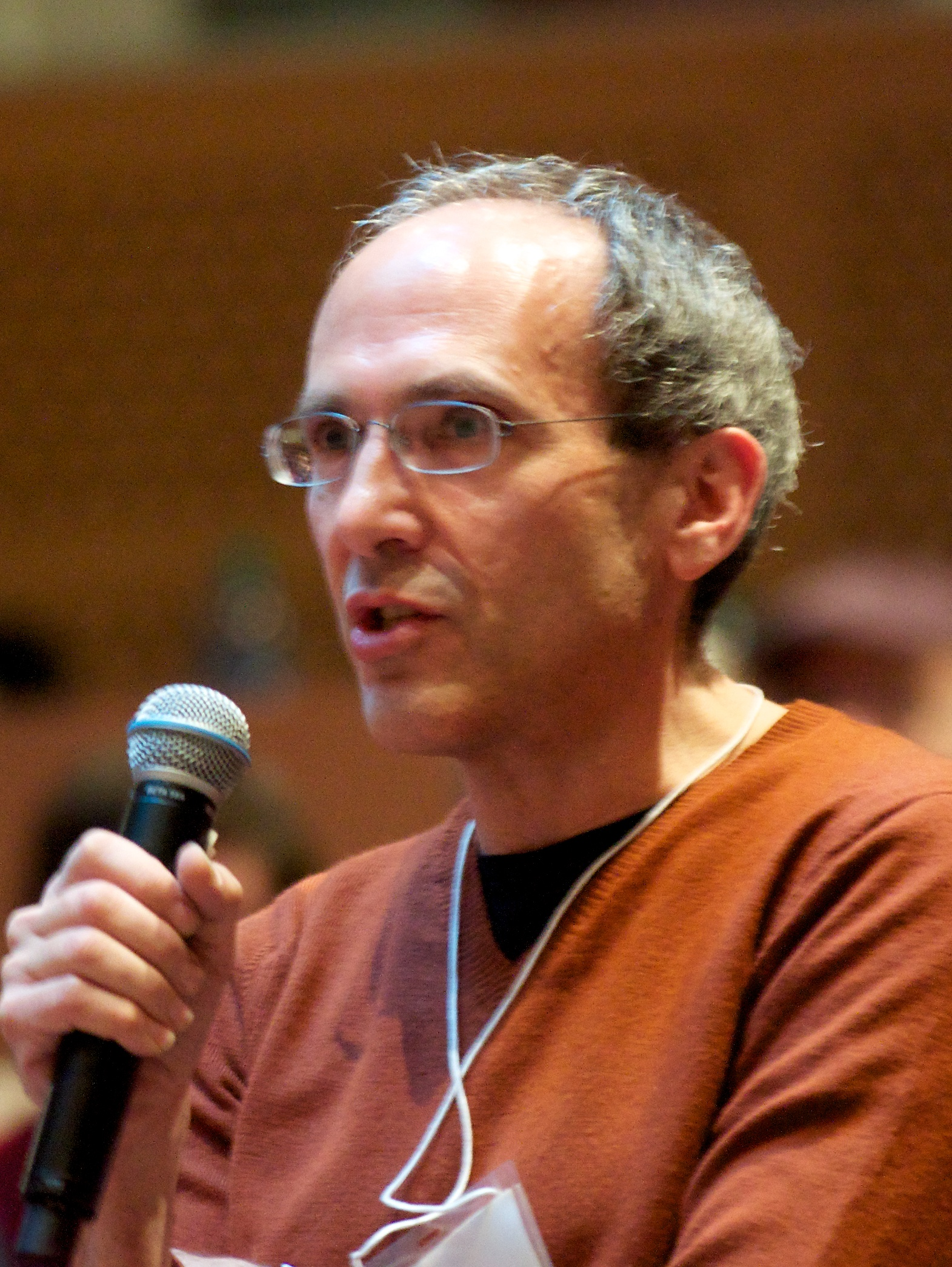
- Born: January 31, 1959 (age 67); Glen Cove, New York, U.S.
- Known for: Distributed morphology

Academic background
- Education: MIT, Oberlin College
- Doctoral advisor: Noam Chomsky

Academic work
- Discipline: Linguistics
- Institutions: New York University, MIT, UNC-Chapel Hill
- Doctoral students: Heidi Harley
- Main interests: Generative grammar, morphology, syntax, neurolinguistics

Alec Marantz (born January 31, 1959) is an American linguist and researcher in the fields of syntax, morphology, and neurolinguistics.

Until 2007, he was Kenan Sahin Distinguished Professor of Linguistics at Massachusetts Institute of Technology, and Research Director of KIT/MIT MEG Joint Research Lab. He has been working at New York University since 2007, and became Silver Professor of Linguistics and Psychology in 2019.

Since the 1980s Marantz has made significant contributions to syntactic theory, especially regarding the structural representation of syntactic arguments, and the semantic and morphological implications of this representation. In the early 1990s Marantz proposed (together with Morris Halle) a theory of architecture of grammar known as Distributed Morphology. More recently, he has been using magnetoencephalography (MEG) to study human language processing, particularly morphology and the mental lexicon.
