= Compound (linguistics) =

Lexeme (word or sign) that consists of more than one stem

In linguistics, a compound is a lexeme (less precisely, a word or sign) that consists of more than one stem. Compounding, composition or nominal composition is the process of word formation that creates compound lexemes. Compounding occurs when two or more words or signs are joined to make a longer word or sign. Consequently, a compound is a unit composed of more than one stem, forming words or signs. If the joining of the words or signs is orthographically represented with a hyphen, the result is a hyphenated compound (e.g., must-have, hunter-gatherer). If they are joined without an intervening space, it is a closed compound or solid compound (e.g., footpath, blackbird). If they are joined with a space (e.g. school bus, cell phone, high school, lowest common denominator), then the result – at least in English – is an open compound.

The meaning of the compound may be similar to or different from the meaning of its components in isolation. The component stems of a compound may be of the same part of speech—as in the case of the English word footpath, composed of the two nouns foot and path—or they may belong to different parts of speech, as in the case of the English word blackbird, composed of the adjective black and the noun bird. With very few exceptions, English compound words are stressed on their first component stem.

Some languages easily form compounds from what in other languages would be a multi-word expression. This can result in unusually long words, a phenomenon known in German (which is one such language) as Bandwurmwörter ("tapeworm words").

Compounding extends to Sign languages as well, where compounds are also created by combining two or more sign stems.

So-called "classical compounds" are compounds derived from classical Latin or ancient Greek roots.

In many languages, including English, Spanish, Latin and German, all numbers greater than twenty that have more than one non-zero digit are written and spoken as compounds.

== Formation of compounds ==
Compound formation rules vary widely across language types.

In a synthetic language, the relationship between the elements of a compound may be marked with a case or other morpheme. For example, the German compound Kapitänspatent consists of the lexemes Kapitän (sea captain) and Patent (license) joined by an -s- (originally a genitive case suffix); and similarly, the Latin lexeme paterfamilias contains the archaic genitive form familias of the lexeme familia (family); in the English word daisy, the saxon genitive (equivalent to -'s) was etymologically fossilized from the Old English compound dæġes ēage (literally, "day's eye"). Conversely, in the Hebrew language compound, the word בֵּית סֵפֶר bet sefer (school), it is the head that is modified: the compound literally means "house-of book", with בַּיִת bayit (house) having entered the construct state to become בֵּית bet (house-of). This latter pattern is common throughout the Semitic languages, though in some it is combined with an explicit genitive case, so that both parts of the compound are marked, e.g.

ʕabd-u l-lāh-i
servant-NOM DEF-god-GEN
"servant of-the-god: the servant of God"

Agglutinative languages tend to create very long words with derivational morphemes. Compounds may or may not require the use of derivational morphemes also.

In German, extremely extendable compound words can be found in many different domains. In the language of chemistry, for example, compounds can be practically unlimited in length, mostly because the German rule suggests combining all noun adjuncts with the noun as the last stem. German examples include Farbfernsehgerät (color television set), Funkfernbedienung (radio remote control), and the often quoted jocular word Donaudampfschifffahrtsgesellschaftskapitänsmütze (originally only two Fs, Danube-Steamboat-Shipping Company captain['s] hat), which can of course be made even longer and even more absurd, e.g. Donaudampfschifffahrtsgesellschaftskapitänsmützenreinigungsausschreibungsverordnungsdiskussionsanfang ("beginning of the discussion of a regulation on tendering of Danube steamboat shipping company captain hats") etc. According to several editions of the Guinness Book of World Records, the longest published German word has 79 letters and is Donaudampfschiffahrtselektrizitätenhauptbetriebswerkbauunterbeamtengesellschaft ("Association for Subordinate Officials of the Main Electric[ity] Maintenance Building of the Danube Steam Shipping"), but there is no evidence that this association ever actually existed.

In Finnish, although there is theoretically no limit to the length of compound words, words consisting of more than three components are rare. Internet folklore sometimes suggests that lentokonesuihkuturbiinimoottoriapumekaanikkoaliupseerioppilas (airplane jet turbine engine auxiliary mechanic non-commissioned officer student) is the longest word in Finnish, but evidence of its actual use is scant and anecdotal at best.

Compounds can be rather long when translating technical documents from English to some other language, since the lengths of the words are theoretically unlimited, especially in chemical terminology. For example, when translating an English technical document to Swedish, the term "Motion estimation search range settings" can be directly translated to rörelseuppskattningssökintervallsinställningar, though in reality, the word would most likely be divided in two: sökintervallsinställningar för rörelseuppskattning – "search range settings for motion estimation".

== Subclasses ==
=== Semantic classification ===
A common semantic classification of compounds yields four types:

- endocentric
- exocentric
- copulative
- appositional

An endocentric compound (tatpuruṣa in the Sanskrit tradition) consists of a head, i.e. the categorical part that contains the basic meaning of the whole compound, and modifiers, which restrict this meaning. The compound word is a hyponym of the head. For example, the English compound doghouse, where house is the head and dog is the modifier, is understood as a house intended for a dog. Endocentric compounds tend to be of the same part of speech (word class) as their head, as in the case of doghouse.

An exocentric compound (bahuvrihi in the Sanskrit tradition) is a compound where the semantic category (e.g. person, plant, or animal) is not stated. Neither of its components is a head, and its meaning often cannot be transparently guessed from its constituent parts. For example, the English compound white-collar is neither a kind of collar nor a white thing. In an exocentric compound, the word class is determined lexically, disregarding the class of the constituents. For example, a must-have is not a verb but a noun. The meaning of this type of compound can be glossed as "(one) whose B is A", where B is the second element of the compound and A the first. Other English examples include barefoot.

Copulative compounds (dvandva in the Sanskrit tradition) are compounds with two semantic heads. These are commonly used to describe points on a gradual scale, such as yellow-green.

Appositional compounds are lexemes that have two (contrary or simultaneous) attributes that classify the compound.

Type	Description	Examples
endocentric	A+B denotes a special kind of B	darkroom, smalltalk
exocentric	A+B denotes a special kind of an unexpressed different semantic meaning C	redhead, scarecrow
copulative	A+B denotes 'the sum' of what A and B denote	bittersweet, sleepwalk
appositional	A and B provide different descriptions for the same referent	hunter-gatherer, maidservant

=== Syntactic classification ===
==== Noun–noun compounds ====
All natural languages have compound nouns. The positioning of the words (i.e. the most common order of constituents in phrases where nouns are modified by adjectives, by possessors, by other nouns, etc.) varies according to the language. While Germanic languages, for example, are left-branching when it comes to noun phrases (the modifiers come before the head), the Romance languages are usually right-branching.

English compound nouns can be spaced, hyphenated, or solid, and they sometimes change orthographically in that direction over time, reflecting a semantic identity that evolves from a mere collocation to something stronger in its solidification. This theme has been summarized in usage guides under the aphorism that "compound nouns tend to solidify as they age"; thus a compound noun such as place name begins as spaced in most attestations and then becomes hyphenated as place-name and eventually solid as placename, or the spaced compound noun file name directly becomes solid as filename without being hyphenated.

Types of English compound nouns
Type	Description	Examples
Spaced (or open)	The words are not visibly connected in writing.	place name, ice cream
Hyphenated	A hyphen is used to join the words.	place-name, hunter-gatherer
Solid (or closed)	When written, there is no space or intervening punctuation.	placename, scarecrow

German, a fellow West Germanic language, has a somewhat different orthography, whereby compound nouns are virtually always required to be solid or at least hyphenated; even the hyphenated styling is used less now than it was in centuries past.

In French, compound nouns are often formed by left-hand heads with prepositional components inserted before the modifier, as in chemin-de-fer 'railway', lit. 'road of iron', and moulin à vent 'windmill', lit. 'mill (that works)-by-means-of wind'.

In Turkish, one way of forming compound nouns is as follows: yeldeğirmeni 'windmill' (yel: wind, değirmen-i: mill-possessive); demiryolu 'railway' (demir: iron, yol-u: road-possessive).

Occasionally, two synonymous nouns can form a compound noun, resulting in a pleonasm. One example is the English word pathway.

In Arabic, there are two distinct criteria unique to Arabic, or potentially Semitic languages in general. The initial criterion involves whether the possessive marker li-/la 'for/of' appears or is absent when the first element is definite. The second criterion deals with the appearance/absence of the possessive marker li-/la 'for/of' when the first element is preceded by a cardinal number.

==== Verb–noun compounds ====
A type of compound that is fairly common in Indo-European languages is formed by a verb and its object. It in effect transforms a simple verbal clause into a noun. In Spanish, for example, such compounds consist of a verb conjugated for the second person singular imperative followed by a noun (singular or plural): e.g., rascacielos (modelled on "skyscraper", lit. 'scratch skies'), sacacorchos 'corkscrew' (lit. 'pull corks'), guardarropa 'wardrobe' (lit. 'store clothes'). These compounds are formally invariable in the plural (but in many cases they have been reanalyzed as plural forms, and a singular form has appeared). French and Italian have these same compounds with the noun in the singular form: Italian grattacielo 'skyscraper', French grille-pain 'toaster' (lit. 'toast bread').

This construction exists in English, generally with the verb and noun both in uninflected form: examples are spoilsport, killjoy, breakfast, cutthroat, pickpocket, dreadnought, and know-nothing.

A special kind of compounding is incorporation, of which noun incorporation into a verbal root (as in English backstabbing, breastfeed, etc.) is most prevalent. An argument of the verb is incorporated into the verb, which is then usually turned into a gerund, such as breastfeeding, finger-pointing, etc. The noun is often an instrumental complement. From these gerunds new verbs can be made: (a mother) breastfeeds (a child) and from them new compounds mother-child breastfeeding, etc.

In the Australian Aboriginal language Jingulu, a Pama–Nyungan language, it is claimed that all verbs are V+N compounds, such as "do a sleep", or "run a dive", and the language has only three basic verbs: do, make, and run.

==== Verb–verb compounds ====
Verb–verb compounds are sequences of more than one verb acting together to determine clause structure. They have two types:

- In a serial verb, two actions, often sequential, are expressed in a single clause. For example:

trɔ dzo
turn leave
"turn and leave"

जाकर देखो
jā-kar dekh-o
go-CONJ.PTCP see-IMP
"go and see"

van̪t̪u paːr
1 2
"come see"

এসে দেখুন
1 2
"come see"

In each case, the two verbs together determine the semantics and argument structure.

Serial verb expressions in English may include What did you go and do that for?, or He just upped and left; this is however not quite a true compound since they are connected by a conjunction and the second missing arguments may be taken as a case of ellipsis.

- In a compound verb (or complex predicate), one of the verbs is the primary, and determines the primary semantics and also the argument structure. The secondary verb, often called a vector verb or explicator, provides fine distinctions, usually in temporality or aspect, and also carries the inflection (tense and/or agreement markers). The main verb usually appears in conjunctive participial (sometimes zero) form. For examples, Hindi निकल गया nikal gayā, lit. "exit went", means 'went out', while निकल पड़ा nikal paRā, lit. "exit fell", means 'departed' or 'was blurted out'. In these examples निकल nikal is the primary verb, and गया gayā and पड़ा paRā are the vector verbs. Similarly, in both English start reading and Japanese 読み始める yomihajimeru "read-CONJUNCTIVE-start" "start reading", the vector verbs start and 始める hajimeru "start" change according to tense, negation, and the like, while the main verbs reading and 読み yomi "reading" usually remain the same. An exception to this is the passive voice, in which both English and Japanese modify the main verb, i.e. start to be read and 読まれ始める yomarehajimeru lit. "read-PASSIVE-(CONJUNCTIVE)-start" start to be read. With a few exceptions, all compound verbs alternate with their simple counterparts. That is, removing the vector does not affect grammaticality at all nor the meaning very much: निकला nikalā '(He) went out.' In a few languages both components of the compound verb can be finite forms: Kurukh kecc-ar ker-ar lit. "died-3pl went-3pl" '(They) died.'
- Compound verbs are very common in some languages, such as the northern Indo-Aryan languages Hindustani and Punjabi, and Dravidian languages like Tamil, where as many as 20% of verb forms in running text are compound. They exist but are less common in other Indo-Aryan languages like Marathi and Nepali, in Tibeto-Burman languages like Limbu and Newari, in Turkic languages like Turkish and Kyrgyz, in Korean and Japanese, and in northeast Caucasian languages like Tsez and Avar.

==== Parasynthetic compounds ====
Parasynthetic compounds are formed by a combination of compounding and derivation, with multiple lexical stems and a derivational affix. For example, English black-eyed is composed of black, eye, and -ed 'having', with the meaning 'having a black eye'; Italian imbustare is composed of in- 'in', busta 'envelope', -are (verbal suffix), with the meaning 'to put into an envelope'.

==== Compound adpositions ====
Compound prepositions formed by prepositions and nouns are common in English and the Romance languages (consider English on top of, Spanish encima de, etc.). Hindi has a small number of simple (i.e., one-word) postpositions and a large number of compound postpositions, mostly consisting of simple postposition ke followed by a specific postposition (e.g., ke pas, "near"; ke nīche, "underneath").

== Examples from different languages ==
Arabic:

- معلمو الفيزياء muʕallim-uu l-fiizyaaʔ 'the physics teachers': معلمو muʕallim-uu 'teachers' + الفيزياء fiizyaaʔ 'physics'
- إبرة المخدر ʔibrat l-muxaddir 'the anaesthesia needle': إبرة ʔibrat 'needle' + مخدر muxaddir 'anaesthesia'

Bengali:

- রাজপুত্র rajputro 'prince': রাজা raja 'king' + পুত্র putro 'son'
- গৃহকর্তা grihokοrta 'householder': গৃহ griho 'house' + কর্তা korta 'master'
- বিদ্যালয় bidyaloy 'school': বিদ্যা bidya 'knowledge' + আলয় aloy 'abode'

Chinese (traditional/simplified Chinese; Standard Chinese Pinyin/Cantonese Jyutping):

- 學生/学生 'student': 學 xué/hok6 learn + 生 shēng/sang1 living being
- 太空/太空 'space': 太 tài/taai3 great + 空 kōng/hung1 emptiness
- 摩天樓/摩天楼 'skyscraper': 摩 mó/mo1 touch + 天 tiān/tin1 sky + 樓 lóu/lau2 building (with more than 1 storey)
- 打印機/打印机 'printer': 打 dǎ/daa2 strike + 印 yìn/yan3 stamp/print + 機 jī/gei1 machine
- 百科全書/百科全书 'encyclopaedia': 百 bǎi/baak3 hundred + 科 kē/fo1 (branch of) study + 全 quán/cyun4 entire/complete + 書 shū/syu1 book
- 謝謝/谢谢 'thanks': Repeating of 謝 xiè thank

Dutch:

- arbeidsongeschiktheidsverzekering 'disability insurance': arbeid 'labour' + ongeschiktheid 'inaptitude' + verzekering 'insurance'.
- rioolwaterzuiveringsinstallatie 'sewage treatment plant': riool 'sewer' + water 'water' + zuivering 'cleaning' + installatie 'installation'.
- verjaardagskalender 'birthday calendar': verjaardag 'birthday' + kalender 'calendar'.
- klantenservicemedewerker 'customer service representative': klanten 'customers' + service 'service' + medewerker 'worker'.
- universiteitsbibliotheek 'university library': universiteit 'university' + bibliotheek 'library'.
- doorgroeimogelijkheden 'possibilities for advancement': door 'through' + groei 'grow' + mogelijkheden 'possibilities'.

Finnish:

- sanakirja 'dictionary': sana 'word' + kirja 'book'
- tietokone 'computer': tieto 'knowledge data' + kone 'machine'
- keskiviikko 'Wednesday': keski 'middle' + viikko 'week'
- maailma 'world': maa 'land' + ilma 'air'
- rautatieasema 'railway station': rauta 'iron' + tie 'road' + asema 'station'
- kolmivaihekilowattituntimittari 'electricity meter': 'three-phase kilowatt hour meter'

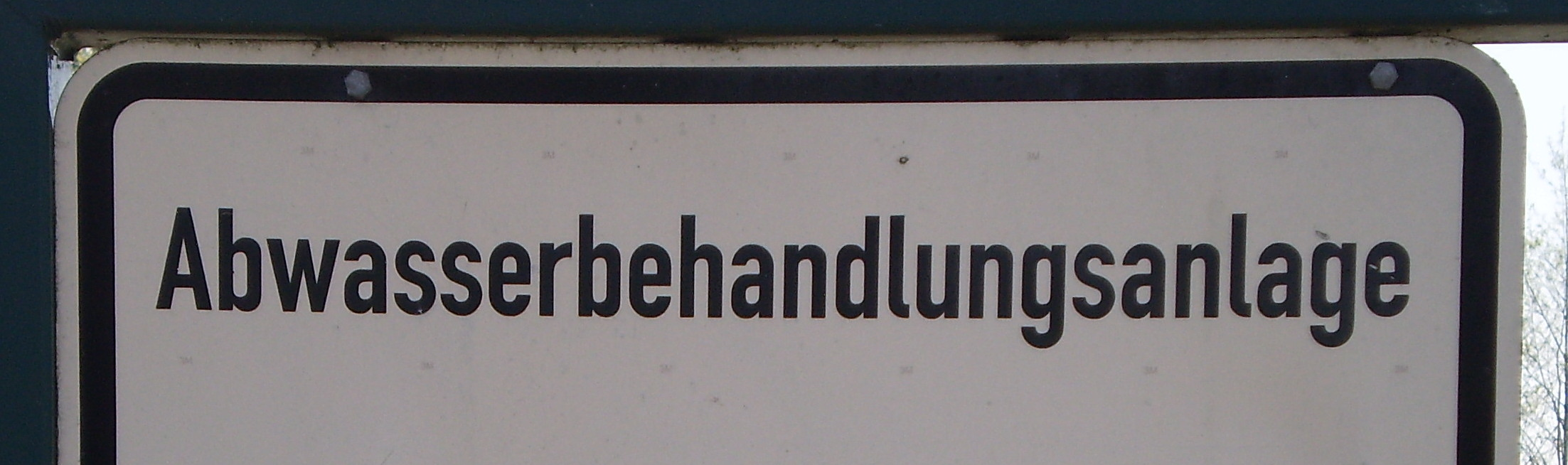
Sewage-treatment-facility – The German language has many compounds.

German:

- Wolkenkratzer 'skyscraper': Wolken 'clouds' + Kratzer 'scraper'
- Eisenbahn 'railway': Eisen 'iron' + Bahn 'track'
- Kraftfahrzeug 'automobile': Kraft 'power' + fahren/fahr 'drive' + Zeug 'machinery'
- Stacheldraht 'barbed wire': Stachel 'barb/barbed' + Draht 'wire'
- Rinderkennzeichnungs- und Rindfleischetikettierungsüberwachungsaufgabenübertragungsgesetz: literally cattle-marking- and beef-labeling-supervision-duties-delegation law

Ancient Greek:

- φιλόσοφος philósophos 'philosopher': φίλος phílos 'beloved' + σοφία sophíā 'wisdom'
- δημοκρατία dēmokratíā 'democracy': δῆμος dêmos 'people' + κράτος 'rule'
- ῥοδοδάκτυλος rhododáktylos 'rose-fingered': ῥόδον rhódon 'rose' + δάκτυλος dáktylos 'finger' (a Homeric epithet applied to the Dawn)

Hindi:

- राजपुत्र raajputra 'prince': राजा raaja 'king' + पुत्र putra 'son'
- विद्यालय vidyaalay 'school': विद्या vidyaa 'knowledge' + आलय aalay 'abode'
- देशभक्त deshbhakt 'patriot': देश desh 'country' + भक्त bhakt 'devotee'

Icelandic:

- járnbraut 'railway': járn 'iron' + braut 'path' or 'way'
- farartæki 'vehicle': farar 'journey' + tæki 'apparatus'
- alfræðiorðabók 'encyclopedia': al 'everything' + fræði 'study' or 'knowledge' + orðabók 'dictionary' (orða 'words' + bók 'book')
- símtal 'telephone conversation': sím 'telephone' + tal 'dialogue'

Italian:

- millepiedi 'millipede': mille 'thousand' + piedi 'feet'
- ferrovia 'railway': ferro 'iron' + via 'way'
- tergicristallo 'windscreen wiper': tergere 'to wash' + cristallo 'crystal (pane of) glass'
- pomodoro: pomo d'oro = apple of Gold = tomatoes
- portacenere = porta cenere = ashtray

Japanese:

- 目覚まし（時計） mezamashi(dokei) 'alarm clock': 目 me 'eye' + 覚まし samashi (-zamashi) 'awakening (someone)' (+ 時計 tokei (-dokei) clock)
- お好み焼き okonomiyaki: お好み okonomi 'preference' + 焼き yaki 'cooking'
- 日帰り higaeri 'day trip': 日 hi 'day' + 帰り kaeri (-gaeri) 'returning (home)'
- 国会議事堂 kokkaigijidō 'national diet building': 国会 kokkai 'national diet' + 議事 giji 'proceedings' + 堂 dō 'hall'

Korean:

- 안팎 anpak 'inside and outside': 안 an 'inside' + 밖 bak 'outside' (As two nouns compound the consonant sound 'b' fortifies into 'p' becoming 안팎 anpak rather than 안밖 anbak)

Ojibwe/Anishinaabemowin:

- mashkikiwaaboo 'tonic': mashkiki 'medicine' + waaboo 'liquid'
- miskomin 'raspberry': misko 'red' + miin 'berry'
- dibik-giizis 'moon': dibik 'night' + giizis 'sun'
- gichi-mookomaan 'white person/American': gichi 'big' + mookomaan 'knife'

Spanish:

- ciencia-ficción 'science fiction': ciencia, 'science', + ficción, 'fiction' (This word is a calque from the English expression science fiction. In English, the head of a compound word is the last morpheme: science fiction. Conversely, the Spanish head is located at the front, so ciencia ficción sounds like a kind of fictional science rather than scientific fiction.)
- ciempiés 'centipede': cien 'hundred' + pies 'feet'
- ferrocarril 'railway': ferro 'iron' + carril 'lane'
- paraguas 'umbrella': para 'stops' + aguas '(the) water'
- cabizbajo 'keeping the head low in a bad mood': cabeza 'head' + bajo 'down'
- subibaja 'seesaw' (contraction of sube y baja 'goes up and down')
- limpiaparabrisas 'windshield wiper' is a nested compound: limpia 'clean' + parabrisas windshield, which is itself a compound of para 'stop' + brisas 'breezes'.

Tamil:

- In Cemmozhi (Classical Tamil), rules for compounding are laid down in grammars such as Tolkappiyam and Nannūl, in various forms, under the name punarcci. Examples of compounds include kopuram from 'kō' (king) + 'puram' (exterior). Sometimes phonemes may be inserted during the blending process such as in kovil from 'kō' (king) + 'il' (home). Other types are like vennai (butter) from 'veḷḷai' (white) + 'nei' (ghee); note how 'veḷḷai' becomes 'ven'.
- In koṭuntamizh (Non-standard Tamil), parts of words from other languages may be morphed into Tamil. Common examples include 'ratta-azhuttam' (blood pressure) from the Sanskrit rakta (blood) and Cemmozhi 'azhuttam' (pressure); note how rakta becomes ratta in Tamil order to remove the consonant-cluster. This also happens with English, for examples kāpi-kaṭai (coffee shop) is from English coffee, which becomes kāpi in Tamil, and the Tamil kaṭai meaning shop.

Tłįchǫ Yatiì/Dogrib:

- dlòotsǫ̀ǫ̀ 'peanut butter': dlòo 'squirrel' + tsǫ̀ǫ̀ 'dung'
- eyakǫ̀ 'hospital': eya 'sick' + kǫ̀ 'house'
- dè gotłeè 'kerosene': dè 'land' + gotłeè 'its fat'
- dǫ łèt'è 'bannock': dǫ '[Aboriginal] people' + łèt'è 'bread'

=== Russian language ===
In the Russian language compounding is a common type of word formation, and several types of compounds exist, both in terms of compounded parts of speech and of the way of the formation of a compound.

Compound nouns may be agglutinative compounds, hyphenated compounds (стол-книга 'folding table', lit. 'table-book', "book-like table"), or abbreviated compounds (acronyms: колхоз 'kolkhoz'). Some compounds look like acronym, while in fact they are an agglutinations of type stem + word: Академгородок 'Akademgorodok' (from akademichesky gorodok 'academic village'). In agglutinative compound nouns, an agglutinating infix is typically used: пароход 'steamship': пар + о + ход. Compound nouns may be created as noun+noun, adjective + noun, noun + adjective (rare), noun + verb (or, rather, noun + verbal noun).

Compound adjectives may be formed either per se (бело-розовый 'white-pink') or as a result of compounding during the derivation of an adjective from a multi-word term: Каменноостровский проспект ([kəmʲɪnnʌʌˈstrovskʲɪj prʌˈspʲɛkt]) 'Stone Island Avenue', a street in St.Petersburg.

Reduplication in Russian is also a source of compounds.

=== Sanskrit language ===
Sanskrit is very rich in compound formation with seven major compound types and as many as 55 sub-types. The compound formation process is productive, so it is not possible to list all Sanskrit compounds in a dictionary. Compounds of two or three words are more frequent, but longer compounds with some running through pages are not rare in Sanskrit literature. Some examples are below (hyphens below show individual word boundaries for ease of reading but are not required in original Sanskrit).

- हिमालय (IAST Himālaya, decomposed as hima-ālaya): Name of the Himalaya mountain range. Literally the abode of snow. A compound of two words and four syllables.
- प्रवर-मुकुट-मणि-मरीचि-मञ्जरी-चय-चर्चित-चरण-युगल (IAST pravara-mukuṭa-maṇi-marīci-mañjarī-caya-carcita-caraṇa-yugala): Literally, O the one whose dual feet are covered by the cluster of brilliant rays from the gems of the best crowns, from the Sanskrit work Panchatantra. A compound of nine words and 25 syllables.
- कमला-कुच-कुङ्कुम-पिञ्जरीकृत-वक्षः-स्थल-विराजित-महा-कौस्तुभ-मणि-मरीचि-माला-निराकृत-त्रि-भुवन-तिमिर (IAST kamalā-kuca-kuṅkuma-piñjarīkṛta-vakṣaḥ-sthala-virājita-mahā-kaustubha-maṇi-marīci-mālā-nirākṛta-tri-bhuvana-timira): Literally O the one who dispels the darkness of three worlds by the shine of Kaustubha jewel hanging on the chest, which has been made reddish-yellow by the saffron from the bosom of Kamalā (Lakshmi), an adjective of Rama in the Kakabhushundi Rāmāyaṇa. A compound of 16 words and 44 syllables.
- साङ्ख्य-योग-न्याय-वैशेषिक-पूर्व-मीमांसा-वेदान्त-नारद-शाण्डिल्य-भक्ति-सूत्र-गीता-वाल्मीकीय-रामायण-भागवतादि-सिद्धान्त-बोध-पुरः-सर-समधिकृताशेष-तुलसी-दास-साहित्य-सौहित्य-स्वाध्याय-प्रवचन-व्याख्यान-परम-प्रवीणाः (IAST sāṅkhya-yoga-nyāya-vaiśeṣika-pūrva-mīmāṃsā-vedānta-nārada-śāṇḍilya-bhakti-sūtra-gītā-vālmīkīya-rāmāyaṇa-bhāgavatādi-siddhānta-bodha-puraḥ-sara-samadhikṛtāśeṣa-tulasī-dāsa-sāhitya-sauhitya-svādhyāya-pravacana-vyākhyāna-parama-pravīṇāḥ): Literally the acclaimed forerunner in understanding of the canons of Sāṅkhya, Yoga, Nyāya, Vaiśeṣika, Pūrva Mīmāṃsā, Vedānta, Nārada Bhakti Sūtra, Śāṇḍilya Bhakti Sūtra, Bhagavad Gītā, the Ramayana of Vālmīki, Śrīmadbhāgavata; and the most skilled in comprehensive self-study, discoursing and expounding of the complete works of Gosvāmī Tulasīdāsa. An adjective used in a panegyric of Jagadguru Rambhadracharya. The hyphens show only those word boundaries where there is no sandhi. On including word boundaries with sandhi (vedānta=veda-anta, rāmāyaṇa=rāma-ayana, bhāgavatādi=bhāgavata-ādi, siddhānta=siddha-anta, samadhikṛtāśeṣa=samadhikṛta-aśeṣa, svādhyāya=sva-adhyāya), this is a compound of 35 words and 86 syllables.

=== Sign languages ===
Also in sign languages, compounding is a productive word formation process. Both endocentric and exocentric compounds have been described for a variety of sign languages. Copulative compounds or dvandva, which are composed of two or more nouns from the same semantic category to denote that semantic category, also occur regularly in many sign languages. The sign for parents in Italian Sign Language, for instance, is a combination of the nouns 'father' and 'mother'. The sign for breakfast in American Sign Language follows the same concept. The words eat and morning are signed together to create a new word meaning breakfast. This is an example of a sequential compound; in sign languages, it is also possible to form simultaneous compounds, where one hand represents one lexeme while the other simultaneously represents another lexeme. An example is the sign for weekend in Sign Language of the Netherlands, which is produced by simultaneously signing a one-handed version of the sign for Saturday and a one-handed version of the sign for Sunday. In American Sign Language there is another process easily compared to compounding. Blending is the blending of two morphemes to create a new word called a portmanteau. This is different from compounding in that it breaks the strict linear order of compounding.

== Compounding by language ==
- Classical compounds
- English compounds
- German compounds
- Sanskrit compounds
- Arabic compound

== See also ==
- Compound modifier
- Bracketing paradox
- Etymological calque
- Genitive connector
- Incorporation (linguistics)
- Kenning
- Multiword expression
- Neologism
- Noun adjunct
- Phono-semantic matching
- Portmanteau compounds
- Status constructus
- Syllabic abbreviation
- Tweebuffelsmeteenskootmorsdoodgeskietfontein, South African placename
- Word formation
- Univerbation: a phrase becomes a word
