= Generative metrics =

Collective term for three distinct theories of verse structure

Generative metrics (Note: The term was coined by Joseph C. Beaver in a 1969 reaction to the first Halle–Keyser theory. (Brogan 1981, E739)) is the collective term for three distinct theories of verse structure (focusing on the English iambic pentameter) advanced between 1966 and 1977. Inspired largely by the example of Noam Chomsky's Syntactic Structures (1957) and Chomsky and Morris Halle's The Sound Pattern of English (1968), these theories aim principally at the formulation of explicit linguistic rules that will generate (Note: "The epithet derives ultimately from mathematics: to "generate" the members of a mathematical set is to list the conditions governing membership of that set." (Groves 1998, p 86)) all possible well-formed instances of a given meter (e.g. iambic pentameter) and exclude any that are not well-formed. T.V.F. Brogan notes that of the three theories, "[a]ll three have undergone major revision, so that each exists in two versions, the revised version being preferable to the original in every case."

== Halle–Keyser ==
The earliest (and most-discussed) theory of generative metrics is that put forth by Morris Halle and Samuel Jay Keyser — first in 1966 with respect to Chaucer's iambic pentameter, and in its full and revised form in 1971's English Stress: Its Forms, Its Growth, and Its Role in Verse. Halle and Keyser conceive of the iambic pentameter line as a series of (nominally) 10 Weak and Strong positions:

W S W S W S W S W S

but to accommodate acephalous lines, and feminine and triple endings, use this full formulation:

(W) S W S W S W S W S (x) (x)

where the first Weak position is optional, and the final 2 positions (which must be unstressed) are also optional. They then define their signal concept, the Stress Maximum, as a stressed syllable (Note: Note that only the single main stress of a word qualifies as "stressed" here; all secondary or tertiary stresses are considered unstressed for the purposes of the theory. (Halle & Keyser 1972, p 343)) "located between two unstressed syllables in the same syntactic constituent within a line of verse". Finally, the fit between syllables and the positions they occupy are evaluated by these 2 hierarchical sets of correspondence rules:

(i) A position (S or W) corresponds to either

1) a single syllable,
or
2) a sonorant sequence incorporating at most two vowels (immediately adjoining to one another, or separated by a sonorant consonant).

AND

(ii)

1) Stressed syllables occur in S positions and in all S positions;
or
2) Stressed syllables occur only in S positions, but not necessarily in all S positions;
or
3) Stress Maxima occur only in S positions, but not necessarily in all S positions.

Rules are evaluated in order. If rules (i)-1 or (ii)-1 or (ii)-2 are broken, this indicates increasing complexity of the line. But if (i)-2 or (ii)-3 are broken, the line is unmetrical. (Note that some sources erroneously state that the presence of a Stress Maximum makes a line unmetrical; this is false. In Halle & Keyser's theory a Stress Maximum in a W position makes a line unmetrical.)

An example of Halle and Keyser's scansion is:

 /        /     /        M         /
How many bards gild the lapses of time! [7]
 W   S W  S     W     S  W  S  W   S

Stresses are indicated by a slash "/" and Stress Maxima by "M". A single underline indicates a violation of (ii)-1; a double underline indicates a violation of (ii)-1 & 2. In addition, the Stress Maximum "lap", since it occurs on a W position, violating (ii)-3, should get a third underline, rendering the line unmetrical. (Because of display limitations, this is here indicated by striking out the "M".)

Joseph C. Beaver, Dudley L. Hascall, and others have attempted to modify or extend the theory.

=== Criticism ===
The Halle–Keyser system has been criticized because it can identify passages of prose as iambic pentameter.

Later generative metrists pointed out that poets have often treated non-compound words of more than one syllable differently from monosyllables and compounds of monosyllables. Any normally weak syllable may be stressed as a variation if it is a monosyllable, but not if it is part of a polysyllable except at the beginning of a line or a phrase. Thus Shakespeare wrote:

 ×    ×  /    /      ×  /    ×  /   ×  /
For the four winds blow in from every coast [9]

but wrote no lines of the form of:

×   × /      /   ×  / ×   /  ×     /
As gazelles leap a never-resting brook

The stress patterns are the same, and in particular, the normally weak third syllable is stressed in both lines; the difference is that in Shakespeare's line the stressed third syllable is a one-syllable word, "four", whereas in the un-Shakespearean line it is part of a two-syllable word, "gazelles". (The definitions and exceptions are more technical than stated here.) Pope followed such a rule strictly, Shakespeare fairly strictly, Milton much less, and Donne not at all—which may be why Ben Jonson said Donne deserved hanging for "not keeping of accent".

Derek Attridge has pointed out the limits of the generative approach; it has “not brought us any closer to understanding why particular metrical forms are common in English, why certain variations interrupt the metre and others do not, or why metre functions so powerfully as a literary device.” Generative metrists also fail to recognize that a normally weak syllable in a strong position will be pronounced differently, i.e. “promoted” and so no longer "weak."

== Magnuson–Ryder ==
A Distinctive Feature Analysis of verse was advanced by Karl Magnuson and Frank Ryder in 1970 and revised in 1971, based on their earlier work on German verse, and ultimately deriving from phonological distinctive feature principles of the Prague School. They similarly propose that iambic pentameter consists of a 10-position line of Odd and Even slots:

O E O E O E O E O E

However, in other meters these slots retain their identities of odd = "not metrically prominent" and even = "metrically prominent", so that (for example) trochaic tetrameter has the structure:

E O E O E O E O [12]

They then label each syllable in the verse line, according to the presence (+) or absence (-) of 4 linguistic features: Word Onset, Weak, Strong, Pre-Strong. Each type of position has an "expected" set of values for these features:

Feature	Odd	Even
Word Onset (WO)	-	+
Weak (WK)	+	-
Strong (ST)	-	+
Pre-Strong (PS)	+	-

Thus:

    O  E   O  E        O   E  O     E    O   E
WO  +  -   +  +        +   -  -     +    +   +
WK  -  +   +  -        -   -  +     -    +   +
ST  +  -   -  +        +   +  -     +    -   -
PS  -  -   -  -        +   -  -     -    -   -
   Batter my heart, three-personed God, for you [13]

The expected values are then compared to the actual values of the verse line. "Since the expectation matrix can never be fulfilled completely, it follows that one must assume all poetry to be unmetrical in some degree, and the task of prosody is to find the constraints upon the conditions under which a feature may occur in a nonaffirming relation to the matrix. These constraints are the Base Rules."

Their revised theory claims to generate the vast majority of canonical English iambic pentameter using only 2 features — Strong (ST) and Pre-strong (PS) — and only 2 Base Rules constraining neighboring syllables in E O slots:

1. If the E slot contains [+PS], then the following O slot must contain [+PS].
2. If the E slot contains [-ST] and the following O slot contains [-PS], then that O slot must also contain [-ST].

with the limitation that these Base Rules do not apply across line-juncture or major syntactic boundary.

=== Criticism ===
T.V.F. Brogan says of the theory, "It is fair to say that so far their approach has been considered unfruitful by most metrists." However, Derek Attridge considers that David Chisholm's modification of Magnuson–Ryder — along with Kiparsky's theory — "capture the details of English metrical practice more accurately than any of their [generative] predecessors".

== Kiparsky ==
Paul Kiparsky's theory, introduced in 1975 and radically revised in 1977, contrasts decisively with previous generative theories on certain key points. Though retaining the now-familiar 10-position line, he reintroduces metrical feet (a concept explicitly denied by other generative metrists) by "bracketing" Weak and Strong positions:

(W S) (W S) (W S) (W S) (W S)[d]

Furthermore, Kiparsky's account "is based on a specific theory of English stress elaborated by Liberman and Prince (1977) as a counter-proposal to Chomsky and Halle's Sound Pattern of English." Conversely, he considers the syllables in a verse line to have a complex hierarchical structure — analogous to a core proposition in Chomsky's transformational grammar — as opposed to the previous theories which gave syllables a strictly linear treatment.

Once the verse text has been parsed and its syllables assigned "W" and "S" labels and hierarchical relationships, it can be compared with the metrical structure of the line (also labeled "W" and "S" and with its own less complex bracketed relationships — as above). "Labeling mismatches" may render the line more complex or unmetrical: different rules reflect different poets' practice. " 'Bracketing' mismatches occur when the two patterns of W and S agree but the brackets to each pattern are out of sync — as with trochaic words in an iambic line." (These only render the line more complex.) The most essential test of metricality is "that the more closely an S-syllable in W-position is bound (in the Liberman-Prince tree-notation) to the syllable that precedes it, the more metrically disruptive it is."

=== Criticism ===
Peter L. Groves has objected that "[a]ccording to Kiparsky, a line will be unmetrical for the vast majority of English poets (including Shakespeare) if [as below] it contains an S-syllable in W-position immediately preceded by a W-syllable which it commands; thus an innocuous line like [that below, from Othello] is ruled categorically unmetrical:"

      W S
Give renew'd fire to our extincted Spirits [24]
 (W   S)(W    S)  (W S) (W  S) (W    S)X

== Sources ==
- Attridge, Derek (1982). The Rhythms of English Poetry. New York: Longman. ISBN 0-582-55105-6.
- Beaver, Joseph C. (1974). "Generative Metrics". In Preminger, Alex; et al. (eds.). Princeton Encyclopedia of Poetry and Poetics (Enlarged ed.). Princeton, NJ: Princeton University Press. pp. 931–933. ISBN 0-691-01317-9.
- Brogan, T.V.F. (1999) [1981]. English Versification, 1570–1980: A Reference Guide With a Global Appendix (Hypertext ed.). Baltimore: Johns Hopkins University Press. ISBN 0-8018-2541-5. (publisher and ISBN is for the original printed edition)
- Brogan, T.V.F. (1993). "Generative Metrics". In Preminger, Alex; Brogan, T.V.F.; et al. (eds.). The New Princeton Encyclopedia of Poetry and Poetics. New York: MJF Books. pp. 451–453. ISBN 1-56731-152-0.
- Groves, Peter L. (1998). Strange Music: The Metre of the English Heroic Line. ELS Monograph Series No.74. Victoria, BC: University of Victoria. ISBN 0-920604-55-2.
- Halle, Morris; Keyser, Samuel Jay (1972). "English III: The Iambic Pentameter". In Wimsatt, W.K. (ed.). Versification: Major Language Types. New York: New York University Press. pp. 217–237. ISBN 978-0814791554.
- Magnuson, Karl; Ryder, Frank G. (1970). "The Study of English Prosody: An Alternative Proposal". College English. 31 (8): 789–820. doi:10.2307/374226. JSTOR 374226.
- Magnuson, Karl; Ryder, Frank G. (1971). "Second Thoughts on English Prosody". College English. 33 (2): 198–216. doi:10.2307/374746. JSTOR 374746.
