= Morris Halle =

Latvian-American linguist (1923–2018)

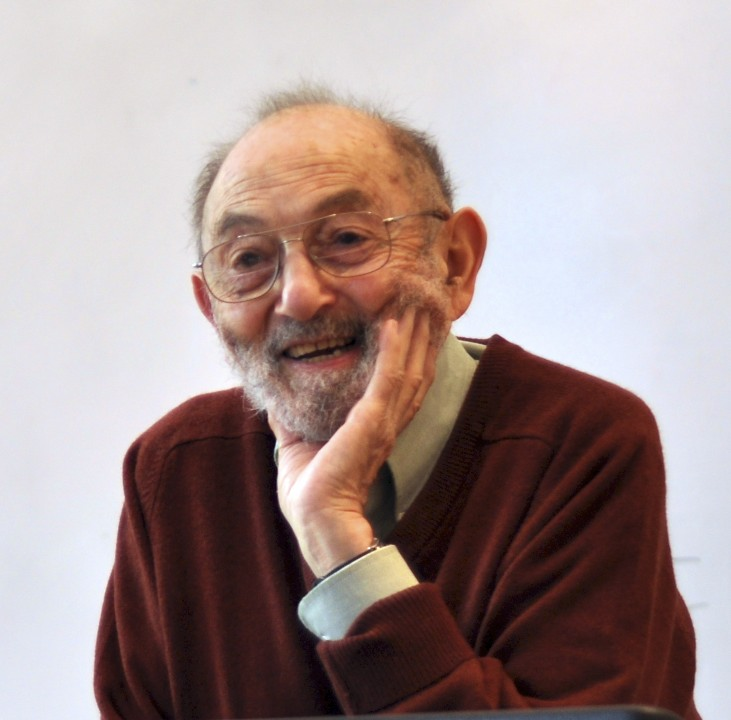
- Halle in 2011
- Born: Morris Pinkowitz; July 23, 1923; Liepāja, Latvia
- Died: April 2, 2018 (aged 94); Cambridge, Massachusetts, U.S.

Academic background
- Education: Harvard University, Columbia University, University of Chicago, City College of New York
- Doctoral advisor: Roman Jakobson

Academic work
- Institutions: Massachusetts Institute of Technology
- Notable students: Mark Aronoff; John Goldsmith; Bruce Hayes; Mark Liberman; Elisabeth Selkirk; Donca Steriade; Bert Vaux; Moira Yip; Arnold Zwicky

Morris Halle (/ˈhæli/ HAL-ee; né Pinkowitz; July 23, 1923 – April 2, 2018) was a Latvian-born American linguist who was an Institute Professor, and later professor emeritus, of linguistics at the Massachusetts Institute of Technology. The father of "modern phonology", he was best known for his pioneering work in generative phonology, having written "On Accent and Juncture in English" in 1956 with Noam Chomsky and Fred Lukoff and The Sound Pattern of English in 1968 with Chomsky. He also co-authored (with Samuel Jay Keyser) the earliest theory of generative metrics, and developed the Distributed Morphology framework with Alec Marantz.

== Life and career ==
Halle was born on July 23, 1923, in Liepāja, Latvia, as Morris Pinkowitz (Latvian: Moriss Pinkovics). In 1929, he moved with his Jewish family to Riga. He arrived in the United States in 1940 and graduated from George Washington High School. From 1941 to 1943, he studied engineering at the City College of New York. He entered the United States Army in 1943 and was discharged in 1946, at which point he went to the University of Chicago, where he got his master's degree in linguistics in 1948. He then studied at Columbia University under Roman Jakobson, became a professor at the Massachusetts Institute of Technology in 1951, and earned his PhD from Harvard University in 1955. He is considered to be, with Noam Chomsky, the founder of the modern linguistics department at MIT. He retired from MIT in 1996, but he remained active in research and publication. He was fluent in German, Yiddish, Latvian, Russian, Hebrew and English.

Halle was a Guggenheim Fellow in 1960. He was President of the Linguistic Society of America in 1974. He was also a fellow of the American Academy of Arts and Sciences, and a member of the National Academy of Sciences.

Halle was married for fifty-six years to painter, artist and activist Rosamond Thaxter Halle (née Strong), until her death in April 2011. They had three sons: David, John and Timothy.

Halle resided in Cambridge, Massachusetts. He died on April 2, 2018, at the age of 94.
