= Ken Hale =

Ken Hale may refer to:

- Kenneth L. Hale (1934–2001), American linguist
- Ken Hale (footballer) (1939–2015), English football manager
- Gorilla-Man, alias Kenneth Hale, Marvel Comics character
