= Distributed morphology =

Theoretical framework in linguistics

In generative linguistics, Distributed Morphology is a theoretical framework introduced in 1993 by Morris Halle and Alec Marantz. The central claim of Distributed Morphology is that there is no divide between the construction of words and sentences. The syntax is the single generative engine that forms sound-meaning correspondences, both complex phrases and complex words. This approach challenges the traditional notion of the lexicon as the unit where derived words are formed and idiosyncratic word-meaning correspondences are stored. In Distributed Morphology there is no unified lexicon, as in earlier generative treatments of word-formation; rather, the functions that other theories ascribe to the lexicon are distributed among other components of the grammar.

== Overview of Distributed Morphology ==
The basic principle of Distributed Morphology is that there is a single generative engine for the formation of both complex words and complex phrases: there is no division between syntax and morphology, and there is no lexicon—at least, not in the same sense as in traditional generative grammar. Any operation that would—according to lexicalist approaches—occur in the 'lexicon' is considered too vague in Distributed Morphology, which instead distributes these operations over various steps and lists.

The term 'Distributed Morphology' is used because the morphology of an utterance is the product of operations distributed over more than one step, with content from more than one list. In contrast to lexicalist models of morphosyntax, Distributed Morphology posits three components in building an utterance:

1. The Formative List provides the input for syntax.
2. The Exponent List (the list of vocabulary items) is consulted to provide the utterance with post-syntactic phonological content.
3. Syntactic operations (such as Merge, Move or Agree, in the Minimalist framework) apply to formatives.

An additional list, the 'Encyclopedia', provides for the realization of non-compositional—idiomatic—meanings. Items from these lists enter the derivation at different stages.

=== Formative list: category-neutral roots ===
The formative list, sometimes called the lexicon (though the former term will be preferred hereafter), includes all the bundles of semantic and sometimes syntactic features that can enter the syntactic computation. These are interpretable or uninterpretable features (such as [+/- animate], [+/- count], etc.) which are manipulated in syntax through syntactic operations. These bundles of features do not have any phonological content; phonological content is assigned to them only at spell-out—i.e., after all syntactic operations are completed. The (Distributed Morphology) formative list thus differs from the (traditional generative grammar) lexicon, which includes the lexical items—such as words and morphemes—in a language.

As its name suggests, the formative list contains what are known as formatives, or roots. In Distributed Morphology, roots are proposed to be category-neutral and undergo categorization by functional elements. Roots have no grammatical categories in and of themselves, and merely represent the bundle of semantic features to be exponed (see "Exponent list", below). The notation for roots in Distributed Morphology generally uses a square root symbol, with an arbitrary number or with the orthographic representation of the root. For example, love, without a grammatical category, could be expressed as √362 or as √LOVE.

Researchers adopting the Distributed Morphology approach agree that roots must be categorized by functional elements. There are multiple ways that this can be done. The following lists four possible routes.

1. Roots are merged as complements to the functional elements that categorize them.
2. Roots are merged as modifiers to the functional elements that categorize them.
3. Some roots are merged as modifiers and others as complements to the function elements that categorize them.
4. Roots are inserted post-syntactically and do not merge with complements or modifiers.

As of 2020, there is no consensus on which approach most accurately describes the structural configuration of root categorization.

=== Exponent list: vocabulary items ===
Vocabulary items associate phonological content with arrays of underspecified syntactic and/or semantic features—the features listed in the lexicon—and they are the closest notion to the traditional morpheme concept as known from generative grammar. Postsyntactic Morphology posits that this operation takes place after the syntax itself has been expressed.

Vocabulary items are also known as the exponent list. In Distributed Morphology, after the syntax of a given utterance is complete, the exponent list must be consulted to provide phonological content. This is known as 'exponing' an item. In other words, a vocabulary item is a relation between a phonological string (which could also be zero or null) and the context in which this string may be inserted. Vocabulary items compete for insertion to syntactic nodes at spell-out, i.e. after syntactic operations are complete.

As an example of a vocabulary item, an affix in Barceloni Catalan can be exponed as follows:

/n/ ←→ [___, +participant +speaker, plural]

The phonological string on the left side is available for insertion to a node with the features described on the right side.

Roots, i.e. formatives from the formative list, are exponed based on their features. For example, the first-person singular pronominal paradigm in English is exponed as follows:

[+1 +sing +nom +prn] ←→ /aj/ [+1 +sing +prn] ←→ /mi/

The use of /mi/ does not seem infelicitous in a nominative context at first glance. If /mi/ acquired nominative case in the syntax, it would seem appropriate to use it. However, /aj/ is specified for the feature [+nom], and therefore must block the use of /mi/ in a nominative context. This is known as the Maximal Subset Condition or the Elsewhere Principle: if two items have a similar set of features, the one that is more specific will win. Illustrated in logical notation:

- f(E1) ⊂ f(T), f(E2) ⊂ f(T), and f(E1) ⊂ f(E2) → f(E2) wins.

In this case, both /mi/ and /aj/ have a subset of features f(T), but /aj/ has the maximal subset.

=== Encyclopedia ===
The Encyclopedia associates syntactic units with special, non-compositional aspects of meaning. This list specifies interpretive operations that realize, in a semantic sense, the terminal nodes of a complete syntactic derivation. For example, the adjectives compárable and cómparable are thought to represent two different structures: the former has a compositional meaning of ‘being able to compare’ (the root combines with a categorizer V- and both then combine with the suffix –able); the latter has an idiomatic meaning of ‘equal’ taken directly from the Encyclopedia (the root combines directly with the –able suffix).

=== Derivation ===
The Y-model of Minimalism, as well as the syntactic operations postulated in Minimalism, are preserved in Distributed Morphology. The derivation of a phrase/word proceeds as follows:

1. A subset of the formative list—i.e., some combination of interpretable and uninterpretable features—and category-neutral lexical roots (e.g. √CAT) enter the computation. These features specify structural relations, which are satisfied via the operation of syntactic operations such as Merge, Move or Agree. For example, if node A has a [+plural] feature, while node B has no value assigned to the feature [plural], then node B could become [+plural] if it is in the right configuration with node A for Agree to apply. The category-neutral roots combine with a categorizer, e.g. N-, A-, or V-, and turn into—respectively—a category noun, adjective or verb. Once all relations specified by the features present in the numeration are satisfied, the syntactic derivation is complete; there is a configuration of terminal nodes (with different combinations of features and their values) and roots, but without phonological content assigned to these nodes. At spell-out, the traditional division into logical form (LF) and phonetic form (PF) of the Y-model takes place.
2. At LF, the encyclopedia is responsible for the semantic interpretation of the terminal nodes. Any non-compositional and idiosyncratic meaning associated with the bundles of features and lexical roots present at the end of the syntactic computation is assigned at this stage.
3. After syntactic operations are complete, certain morphological operations (see below) apply before any assignment of phonological content to the terminal nodes.
4. Once these morphological operations are complete, phonological content is finally assigned to the terminal nodes, through competition of vocabulary items for insertion: each terminal node contains a bundle of features, and all vocabulary items compete for insertion into the terminal nodes; the vocabulary item that wins the competition, and so is inserted in a certain terminal node, is the item that is most highly specified for that node. For example, if—at the end of the derivation—there is a terminal node with the features [+past, + plural, +3rd person] and the lexical root √PLAY, then the phonological content that will be assigned to the node will be the one corresponding to "played": the most highly specified vocabulary item for this node is the item /d/ ←→ [___, +past, plural, 3rd person]. This vocabulary item does not exactly match the features of the terminal node; however, it wins the competition because in English it is the most highly specified vocabulary item for the specific values of features present in the node. Competition for insertion is governed by the Subset Principle, the following version of which is from Halle (1997):

The phonological exponent of a vocabulary item is inserted into a morpheme in the terminal string if the item matches all or a subset of the grammatical features specified in the terminal morpheme. Insertion does not take place if the vocabulary item contains features not present in the morpheme. Where several vocabulary items meet the conditions for insertion, the item matching the greatest number of features specified in the terminal morpheme must be chosen.

== Morphological operations ==
Distributed Morphology recognizes a number of morphology-specific operations that occur post-syntactically. There is no consensus about the order of application of these morphological operations with respect to vocabulary insertion, and it is generally believed that certain operations apply before vocabulary insertion, while others apply to the vocabulary items themselves. For example, Embick and Noyer (2001) argue that Lowering applies before Vocabulary insertion, while Local Dislocation applies afterwards.

Apart from the operations described above, some researchers (Embick 1997 among others) have suggested that there are morphemes that represent purely formal features and are inserted post-syntactically but before spell-out: these morphemes are called "dissociated morphemes".

=== Morphological merger ===
Morphological Merger is generalized as follows in Marantz 1988: 261:

At any level of syntactic analysis (d-structure, s-structure, phonological structure), a relation between X and Y may be replaced by (expressed by) the affixation of the lexical head of X to the lexical head of Y.

Two syntactic nodes can undergo Morphological Merger subject to morphophonological well-formedness conditions.

==== Many-to-one mapping between syntax and morphology: feature fusion ====
Two nodes that have undergone Morphological Merger or that have been adjoined through syntactic head movement can undergo Fusion, yielding one single node for Vocabulary insertion. Many-to-one relation where two syntactic terminals are realized as a single exponent (portmanteau).

An example can be found in Swahili, which has separate exponents for subject agreement (e.g., 1st plural tu-) and negation (ha-):

tu- ta- pend-a kiswahili
we- will- love Swahili

ha- tu- ta- pend-a kiswahili
NEG- we- will- love Swahili

However, 1st person singular exponent ni- and negation ha- undergo fusion and realized as si-:

*ha- ni- ta pend-a kiswahili
NEG- I- will- love Swahili

si- ta- pend-a Kiswahili
NEG.I- will- love Swaihili

An alternative analysis of si- exponent says that there is no fusion but rather context sensitive allomorphy:

si- Ø ta- pend-a Kiswahili
NEG- I- will- love Swaihili

=== Fission ===
Fission refers to the splitting of one terminal node into two distinct terminal nodes prior to Vocabulary Insertion. Some of the most well-known cases of fission involve the imperfect conjugations of Semitic, in which agreement morphology is split into a prefixal and suffixal part, as investigated in the work of Noyer (1992). Fission may also occur where insertion of a Vocabulary item discharges the intrinsic features of the Vocabulary item from the terminal node, leaving others features available for possible insertion; if fission applies, then other Vocabulary items can be inserted to discharge the remaining features. When Fission occurs, the order of morphemes is influenced by the featural complexity of Vocabulary items.

=== Feature impoverishment ===
Impoverishment (a term introduced into the theory in Bonet 1991) refers to a change in the feature content on a terminal node prior to Vocabulary Insertion, resulting in a less marked feature content.

- Feature deletion: This is accomplished by deleting a feature or by changing it from a marked to an unmarked value (e.g. [+plural] to [-plural]). Impoverishment accounts for cases in which spell-out of a terminal node by a featurally specific Vocabulary Item is blocked by a less specific Vocabulary Item.
- Feature obliteration: Impoverishment can target an entire terminal node (rather than just one of its features), in which case it is referred to as 'obliteration'. This results in the complete absence of the morpheme from the structure of the word.

=== Lowering ===
Lowering is sensitive to syntactic headedness and operates on abstract feature bundles, after syntactic movement but prior to vocabulary insertion. Lowering takes place when a head X lowers to the head of its complement, Y. For example, T in English (e.g. +past) lowers to be realized on the head of its complement V, as in "John [_{TP} t_{T} [_{vP} play-ed piano]]." An adjoined adverb will not block this syntactic movement, since it is sensitive to syntactic headedness rather than linear adjacency: "John skillfully play-ed piano." On the other hand, a Merged Negation head will block this movement and trigger 'do insertion':" John did not play piano" (Embick & Noyer 2001:564).

=== Local dislocation ===
String-adjacent Vocabulary items may undergo Local Dislocation, in which the two items form a unit, with reversed linear order. Embick and Noyer (2001) suggest that linearization takes place at Vocabulary Insertion. At this point it is possible to reorder linearly adjacent vocabulary items. This reordering must respect the relationship between the constituents, however. In a linearization [X [Z*Y]], X can undergo Local Dislocation to give the linearization: [[_{Z°}Z+X]*Y]], since Z is still left-adjacent to Y though Z is now an internally complex head (Embick & Noyer 2001:563). The relationship between X and Z has been properly converted through Local Dislocation. Since the relationships between the constituents have been respected or properly converted, the derivation is well-formed. Local Dislocation applies after Vocabulary insertion to reorder two linearly adjacent elements, such as the comparative feature and an adjective in John is smarter than Mary., which contrasts with John is more intelligent than Mary.; in this case the movement makes reference to the phonological features of the moved items, moving -er after an adjective of one syllable, while leaving more in a position dominating the adjective (Embick & Noyer 2001:564).

== Distributed morphology approach to core theoretical issues ==
=== Morpheme order ===
In Distributed Morphology, the linear order of morphemes is determined by their hierarchical position in the syntactic structure, as well as by certain post-syntactic operations. Head movement is the main syntactic operation determining morpheme order, while Morphological Merger (or Merger under Adjacency) is the main post-syntactic operation targeting affix order. Other post-syntactic operations that might affect morpheme order are Lowering and Local Dislocation (see previous section for details on these operations).

==== Head movement ====
Head movement is subject to the Head Movement Constraint, according to which when a head moves, it cannot skip an intervening head. Left adjunction and the Head Movement Constraint ensure that the Mirror Principle holds. The syntactic mechanism responsible for the effects of the Mirror Principle is head movement: heads raise and left-adjoin to higher heads. The general principle behind morpheme order is the Mirror Principle (first formulated by Baker 1985), according to which the linear order of morphemes is the mirror image of the hierarchy of syntactic projections. For example, in a plural noun like cat-s, the plural morpheme is higher in the hierarchy than the noun: [_{NumP} -s[_{NP} cat]]. The Mirror Principle dictates that the linear order of the plural morpheme with respect to the noun should be the mirror image of their hierarchy, namely the attested cat-s. Research subsequent to Baker (1985) has shown that there are some apparent violations to the Mirror Principle and that there are more operations involved in the determination of the final linear order of morphemes. Firstly, the left adjunction requirement of head movement has been relaxed, as right adjunction has been shown to be possible (Harley 2010 among others). Therefore, different heads can have a specification for right vs. left adjunction. We could imagine, for example, that there is a language in which head movement of the noun to the Number head is specified for right adjunction, rather than left adjunction which is the case in English. In that language, the predicted order of the noun and plural morpheme would then be s-cat. Notice, however, that right vs. left adjunction determines whether an affix will be realized as a prefix or a suffix: its closeness to the root will still reflect hierarchical order. Let's look at a hypothetical example to make this clear. Assuming that Tense is merged higher than Aspect, there are four possible orders for the tense and aspect morphemes with respect to the verb stem, once we allow for variation between left and right adjunction in head movement.

1. Verb – Aspect – Tense
2. Tense – Verb – Aspect
3. Aspect-Verb-Tense
4. Tense-Aspect-Verb

Crucially, though, the following two orders are predicted to be impossible.

1. Aspect-Tense- Verb
2. Verb – Tense – Aspect

These orders are the orders in which the tense morpheme is closer to the root than the aspect morpheme. Since Aspect is merged before Tense and morpheme order still reflects hierarchical order, such a configuration is predicted to be impossible.

Finally, certain post-syntactic operations can affect morpheme order. The best studied one is Morphological Merger or Merger Under Adjacency. This operation merges two adjacent terminal nodes into one morphological word. In other words, it allows for two heads which are adjacent to merge into one word without syntactic head movement – the operation is post-syntactic. This operation is doing the work of, say, affix lowering of the past tense morpheme in English in early generative syntax. For the operation to apply, what is crucial is that the morphemes to be merged are linearly adjacent.

=== Allomorphy ===
A core idea in deriving allomorphy in Distributed Morphology is underspecification. Verbal agreement in the present tense in English takes the form /-s/ in the 3rd person singular (‘ex. John eats bologna’), and /Ø/ in all other cases (‘I eat bologna;’ ‘They eat bologna’). The phonological exponents of the feature bundle terminal nodes in the syntactic tree are listed in the Exponent List. We can capture the fact that /-s/ has a much smaller distribution than /Ø/ using the following entries in the Exponent List:

1. [3sg, present] ↔ /-s/
2. [present] ↔ /Ø/

/-s/ will be inserted whenever its full featural specification is met. In all other cases in the present tense however, such as [2sg, present] or [1sg, present], /Ø/ will be inserted. This is a use of underspecification, the idea that there is a ‘default’ morpheme that is inserted in the general case, and more specific morphemes that are inserted in more specific cases, when their featural specifications are met. In the above example, /Ø/ is underspecified in the sense that it is not specified for person. Underspecification relies on the ‘Maximal Subset Condition.’

The Maximal Subset Condition states firstly that, for a given exponent E to be inserted into some feature bundle T, the featural specification on E must be a subset of the features on T. In this way, /-s/ is not a possible exponent for a feature bundle [2sg, present]. However, /Ø/ is a possible exponent for the feature bundle [3sg, present]. To ensure that /-s/ is chosen over /Ø/ for the bundle [3sg, present], the Maximal Subset Condition states secondly that, between two exponents E and F which both contain a subset of the features in a feature bundle T, the exponent that contains the maximal subset of the features in T will be selected.

Featural specification derives allomorphy in featural paradigms. Allomorphy in which different phonological exponents of the same feature bundle are idiosyncratically realized depending on the morphological or phonological environment is captured through contextual specification. An example of such allomorphy is the English plural marker. The typical English plural marker is /-z/, as in bulls. However, the plural of child is children, and the plural of cactus is cacti. Since the choice of the plural morpheme exponent is not related to features, but rather simply to the root it attaches to, the roots must be listed in the contextual specification:

1. [-sg] ↔ /-z/
2. [-sg] ↔ /-ren/ / _ {child}
3. [-sg] ↔ /-i/ / _ {cact}

If the contextual specification of some item is met, it is inserted. Otherwise, insert the item that has no contextual specification. This is an example of the ‘elsewhere condition’. Note that the Maximal Subset Condition stated above is a formal instantiation of the elsewhere condition.

Contextual specification is also used to account for phonologically conditioned suppletive allomorphy, using phonological contexts. Thus, the singular indefinite marker in English can be stated as follows (we could also underspecify one of the allomorphs to express a default morpheme):

1. [-def, +sg] ↔ an / _V
2. [-def, +sg] ↔ a / _C

A prediction about suppletive allomorphy in Distributed Allomorphy is that, assuming exponents are inserted in a bottom-up fashion of the syntactic tree, it should always be ‘inward-looking.’ This means that contextual allomorphy can only involve the selection of an allomorph based on something lower in the tree. That is, the contextual environments must always involve items lower in the tree.

Morphologically conditioned allomorphy may involve suppletion (as in go-Ø/wen-t) or readjustment rules that apply in the context of certain Vocabulary items (as in buy-Ø/bough-t). Suppletion and readjustment rules apply to a terminal node and its associated Vocabulary item – unlike affixation, which combines this terminal node with a separate terminal node that has its own distinct (though potentially null) Vocabulary item. Suppletion arises from the competition of Vocabulary items for insertion into a terminal node. Competition involving root Vocabulary items is a topic of ongoing research, however. Early work in Distributed Morphology suggests that a single, abstract lexical root appears in the syntax; in this view, roots do not compete for insertion into root nodes, but exist in free variation, constrained only by semantic and pragmatic well-formedness. Subsequent research has suggested that the distribution of root Vocabulary items can be grammatically restricted (Embick 2000, Pfau 2000, Marantz 2013); this means that roots may be featurally restricted and thus subject to competition. The issue of whether root alternations such as buy-Ø/bough-t are better handled by suppletion or readjustment rules remains a topic of debate (Embick & Marantz 2008, Siddiqi 2009, Bonet & Harbour 2012).

The term suppletion refers to allomorphy of an open-class lexical item. For a large-scale study of suppletion in the context of comparative and superlative adjectival morphology within the general framework of Distributed Morphology, see Bobaljik (2012).

=== Containment hypothesis ===
The containment hypothesis is a theory under the framework of Distributed Morphology advanced by Bobaljik (2012) to account for the restrictions on the patterns of suppletion seen in language. It states:

"The representation of the superlative properly contains that of the comparative (in all languages that have a morphological superlative)."

Bobaljik argues that if a language has a superlative form, it must build off the comparative form. In other words, the superlative form and the bare adjective cannot be built off the same root to the exclusion of the comparative (a so-called *ABA pattern), because the comparative is necessarily contained within the superlative form. Thus, languages allow:

1. AAA: All three forms to be built off the same adjectival root
2. ABB: The comparative and superlative are suppletive and thus built off a different root from that of the bare adjective
3. ABC: The bare adjective, comparative, and superlative are all built off different roots

Pattern	Language	Adjective	Comparative	Superlative
AAA	Persian	X	X-tær	X-tær-in
AAA	Hungarian	X	X-bb	leg-X-bb
AAA	Chukchi	X	X-əŋ	ənan-X-əŋ
ABB	English	good	better	best
ABB	Czech	špatn-ý 'bad'	hor-ší 'worse'	nej-hor-ší 'worst'
ABC	Latin	bonus 'good'	melior 'better'	optimus 'best'

The exclusion of the *ABA pattern means that there should theoretically exist no language with a pattern analogous to *good – better – goodest. AAB patterns (in which the superlative is suppletive but the comparative builds off the bare adjective) are theoretically possible as well but happen to be rare in the world's languages. Under the model of Distributed Morphology, the structure of a superlative would be [_{SPRL} [_{CMPR} [_{ADJ} Adjective ] Comparative ] Superlative ]. Thus, the exponent of the comparative morpheme attaches to the bare adjective and the exponent of the superlative morpheme attaches to the comparative form (or replaces it in the suppletive cases). The following rules may be posited for Czech as an example:

1. √BAD → špatn-
2. √BAD → hor- / ___ CMPR
3. CMPR → -ší
4. SPRL → nej-

Rule 2 above states that the root BAD is suppleted in the environment of a comparative. By extension, the superlative form attaches the prefix nej- to horši and not to špatn- as the comparative is the only structure it can see. For Latin, in which both the comparative and the superlative are suppleted, the following rules may be posited:

1. √GOOD → bon-
2. √GOOD → mel- / ___ CMPR
3. √GOOD → opt- / ___ SPRL
4. CMPR → -ior
5. SPRL → -imus

As an *ABA pattern would require the adjective to directly combine with the superlative node, it is theoretically impossible because of the intervening comparative node and is also unattested in the world's languages. Nevins (2015) supports the structure by arguing that the semantics of the superlative is dependent on that of the comparative.

1. Comparative: Y is more ADJ than X
2. Superlative: For all X, Y is more ADJ than X

The comparative definition is contained within the superlative one and thus, the superlative must obligatorily subsume it in its structure.

=== Morphological paradigms ===
In Distributed Morphology morphological paradigms are seen as epiphenomena. Irregular forms or gaps associated with paradigms are explained via competition for vocabulary insertion.

=== Meaning in Distributed Morphology ===
In Distributed Morphology there are two different types of meaning: the meaning associated with the bundles of features of the Lexicon and the idiosyncratic meaning listed in the Encyclopedia. It is believed that encyclopedic meaning is associated with lexical roots, rather than with complete phrases.

=== Allosemy ===
Allosemy – the phenomenon in which a single morpheme can have multiple semantic realizations – is handled the same way allomorphy is handled in DM: through contextual specification and the Elsewhere Condition. The Encyclopedic List contains the semantic meaning and context for each entry in the list. When a single morpheme is realized with multiple possible meanings, it has multiple entries in the Encyclopedic List. Thus, we can derive multiple possible meanings of ‘look’ with the following entries: (note: √ indicates root, CAPS LOCK indicates semantic concept)

1. √ look ←→ PHYSICAL APPEARANCE / [__]V Adj
2. √ look ←→ NOTABLE GLANCE / [__]N
3. √ look ←→ CONSULT A SOURCE / [ __ up]V
4. √ look ←→ λ x, λ y, y looks at x / elsewhere

The contextual specifications for √ look will ensure that it has the appropriate interpretation given the context. The contextual specifications can only include various pieces of information, such as the word class of the item, the word class of a sister node, or even the specific morpheme of the sister node. However, it cannot contain any information about a non-sister node (although there will be some complications when a word intervenes between a word and the relevant sister node ex. “look the book up.”). And, just as in the Exponent List, an item in the Encyclopedic List can be specified as being inserted ‘elsewhere:’ in all contexts where the contextual specification of all other entries for that morpheme are not met. Besides expressing the notion of a ‘default’ semantic meaning of a given morpheme, having the elsewhere condition as an explicit contextual specification also allows for the expression of morphemes that do not have a default semantic meaning. For many English speakers, ‘cahoot’ only has an interpretation when preceded by ‘in’ (ex. John was in cahoots with the Russians.) The entry for ‘cahoot’ might have the following entry for such a context:

1. √ cahoot ←→ CONSPIRACY / [ in [ ___ -sg ] ]

To express the fact that this is the only context where cahoot has a meaning, we simply posit that there is no entry for cahoot with the elsewhere condition for its contextual specification. Thus, by allowing for the omission of the elsewhere specification, we can express the fact that certain morphemes require a specific context for interpretation. We can use contextual specification to model other aspects of idiomatic meaning, namely, the fact that idiomatic meaning often does not hold across different syntactic configurations. The expression the shit hit the fan loses its idiomatic meaning if passivized: #the fan was hit by the shit. We can express this fact by specifying voice on the contextual specification for the verb:

1. √ hit ←→BECOME AN EXTREME SITUATION / [voiceactive [ ____ fan]]

Finally, just as in allomorphy, the Maximal Subset Principle will play a part if the contextual specification for one alloseme is a subset of another alloseme. While the following entries for eat, meant to express two possible meanings for the phrase eat up (ex. John ate up the story vs. John ate up all his food), are not necessarily the exact specifications, they illustrate a hypothetical use of the Maximal Subset Condition:

1. √ eat ←→ ENJOY / [ ____ up] [non-food object]
2. √ eat ←→ FINISH THE FOOD / [ ____ up]

The FINISH THE FOOD entry for √ eat will be inserted whenever eat up is followed by any food object. However, when eat up is followed by a non-food object, both entries’ contextual specifications will be met. However, the ENJOY entry is inserted, because more conditions in its contextual specification are met. Thus, the Maximal Subset Condition will choose the alloseme whose contextual specification is most completely satisfied, when there is competition among Encyclopedic List entries.

=== Crosslinguistic variation ===
Since the model of Distributed Morphology consists of three lists (Formative List, Exponent List, Encyclopedia), we expect crosslinguistic variation to be located in all three of them. The feature bundles and their structure might be different from language to language (Formative List), which could affect both syntactic and post-syntactic operations. Vocabulary Items (Exponent List) can also be different crosslinguistically. Finally, the interpretation of roots (Encyclopedia) is also expected to show variation.

== Bibliography ==
- Arregi, Karlos; Andrew Nevins (2007). "Obliteration vs. Impoverishment in the Basque g-/z- Constraint". Proceedings of the 26th Penn Linguistics Colloquium, Penn Working Papers in Linguistics. 13 (1): 1–14.
- Arregi, Karlos, & Andrew Nevins. (2012). Morphotactics: Basque auxiliaries and the structure of spellout. Vol. 86. Dordrecht: Springer.
- Baker, Mark. 1985. The mirror principle and morphosyntactic explanation. Linguistic Inquiry 16: 373–415.
- Bobaljik, Jonathan David (2012). Universals In Comparative Morphology: Suppletion, Superlatives, and the Structure of Words. Cambridge, MA: MIT Press.
- Bonet, Eulàlia (1991). Morphology after Syntax: Pronominal Clitics in Romance. PhD dissertation, MIT. Distributed by MIT Working Papers in Linguistics.
- Bonet, Eulàlia, & Daniel Harbour. (2012). Contextual allomorphy. In J. Trommer (ed.), The handbook of exponence :195–235. Oxford: Oxford University Press.
- Chomsky, Noam. (2000). Minimalist inquiries: the framework. In R. Martin, D. Michaels, & J. Uriagereka (eds.), Step by step: essays on minimalist syntax in honor of Howard Lasnik, 89–155. Cambridge: MIT Press.
- Chomsky, Noam. (2001). Beyond Explanatory Adequacy. In "MIT Occasional Papers in Linguistics 20, 1–28. Cambridge: MITWPL.
- Di Sciullo, Anna-Maria & Edwin Williams. (1987). On the definition of a word. "Linguistic Inquiry Monograph, 14."
- Noyer, Rolf. "Distributed Morphology". University of Pennsylvania Department of Linguistics. Archived from the original on July 16, 2015.
- Embick, David. (2000). Features, syntax, and categories in the Latin perfect. Linguistic Inquiry, 31(2), 185–230.
- Embick, David. (2010). Localism versus globalism in morphology and phonology. Vol. 60. Cambridge, MA: The MIT Press.
- Embick, David & Alec Marantz (2008). Architecture and blocking. Linguistic Inquiry (39)1, 1–53.
- Embick, David, & Rolf Noyer. (2001). Movement operations after syntax. Linguistic Inquiry, 32(4), 555–595.
- Embick, David; Noyer, Rolf (2007), "Distributed Morphology and the Syntax/Morphology Interface", The Oxford Handbook of Linguistic Interfaces, Oxford, UK: Oxford University Press: 289–324
- Halle, Morris. (1997). Distributed Morphology: Impoverishment and Fission. In MIT Working Papers in Linguistics 30: PF: Papers at the Interface, eds. Benjamin Bruening, Yoonjung Kang, and Martha McGinnis, 425–450. Also in J. Lecarme, J. Lowenstein, U. Shlonsky, eds. 2000. Research in Afroasiatic Grammar: Papers from the Third Conference on Afroasiatic Languages, Sophia Antipolis France, 1996. John Benjamins Publishing Co. Amsterdam/Philadelphia, 125–151.
- Halle, Morris; Marantz, Alec (1993), "Distributed Morphology and the Pieces of Inflection", The View from Building 20, Cambridge, MA: MIT Press: 111–176
- Halle, Morris; Marantz, Alec (1994), "Some Key Features of Distributed Morphology", Papers on Phonology and Morphology, MITWPL 21, Cambridge, MA: MIT Working Papers in Linguistics: 275–288
- Harley, Heidi. 2010. Affixation and the mirror principle. Interfaces in Linguistics, New Research Perspectives, Oxford Studies in Theoretical Linguistics 31
- Harley, Heidi. (2005). How do verbs get their names? Denominal verbs, manner incorporation, and the ontology of verb roots in English. In N. Erteschik-Shir & T. Rapoport (eds.), The syntax of aspect: Deriving thematic and aspectual interpretation: 42–64. New York: Oxford University Press.
- Harley, Heidi; Noyer, Rolf (1998), "Licensing in the non-lexicalist lexicon: nominalizations, vocabulary items and the Encyclopedia", MIT Working Papers in Linguistics, 32 (4): 119–137
- Harley, Heidi; Noyer, Rolf (1999), "State-of-the-Article: Distributed Morphology", GLOT International, 4 (4): 3–9
- Kramer, Ruth. (2010). The Amharic definite marker and the syntax–morphology interface. Syntax, 13(3), 196–240.
- Levinson, Lisa. (2010). Arguments for pseudo-resultative predicates. Natural Language and Linguistic Theory 28(1), 135–182.
- Lieber, Rochelle. (1980). "On the organization of the lexicon." Ph.D. Dissertation. Massachusetts Institute of Technology.
- Lomashvili, Leila, & Heidi Harley. (2011). Phases and templates in Georgian agreement. Studia Linguistica, 65(3), 233–267.
- Marantz, Alec (1997), "No Escape From Syntax: Don't Try Morphological Analysis in the Privacy of Your Own Lexicon", University of Pennsylvania Working Papers in Linguistics, Philadelphia, Pennsylvania: Upenn Department of Linguistics
- Marantz, Alec. (2013). Verbal argument structure: Events and participants. Lingua 130, 152–168.
- Marvin, Tatjana. (2002). "Topics in the stress and syntax of words". Ph.D. dissertation. Massachusetts Institute of Technology.
- McGinnis, Martha. (2013). Agree and Fission in Georgian Plurals. In Ora Matushansky & Alec Marantz (eds.), Distributed Morphology Today :39–58. Cambridge, MA: MIT Press.
- McGinnis-Archibald, Martha. (2016). Distributed Morphology. In Hippisley, Andrew & Gregory T. Stump (eds.) "The Cambridge Handbook of Morphology". Cambridge: Cambridge University Press.
- Newell, Heather. (2008). "Aspects of the morphology and phonology of phases". Ph.D. dissertation. McGill University.
- Noyer, Rolf. (1992). "Features, positions and affixes in autonomous morphological structure". Ph.D. dissertation. Massachusetts Institute of Technology.
- Pfau, Roland. (2000). "Features and categories in language production". Ph.D. dissertation. Johann Wolfgang Goethe-Universität.
- Samuels, Bridget D. (2009). "The structure of phonological theory". Ph.D. dissertation. Harvard University.
- Selkirk, Elisabeth. (1982). "The syntax of words." Cambridge, MA: MIT Press.
- Siddiqi, Daniel. (2009). Syntax within the word: economy, allomorphy, and argument selection in Distributed Morphology (Vol. 138). Amsterdam, the Netherlands: John Benjamins Publishing.
- Williams, Edwin. (1981). On the notions "Lexically related" and "Head of a word". Linguistic Inquiry, (12)2, 245–274.
