= Linguistic Inquiry =

- Discipline: Generative linguistics
- Language: English
- Edited by: Samuel Jay Keyser

Publication details
- History: 1970–present
- Publisher: MIT Press (United States)
- Frequency: Quarterly
- Open access: Hybrid
- Impact factor: 1.6 (2024)

Standard abbreviations
- ISO 4: Linguist. Inq.

Indexing
- ISSN: 0024-3892 (print); 1530-9150 (web)
- JSTOR: 00243892

Links
- Journal homepage; Online access

Linguistic Inquiry is a peer-reviewed academic journal in generative linguistics published by the MIT Press since 1970. Ever since its foundation, it has been edited by Samuel Jay Keyser. Many seminal linguistic articles first appeared on its pages. The volumes since 1998 are available online via the site of the publisher.
