= Samuel Jay Keyser =

American linguist (born 1935)

Samuel Jay Keyser (born 7 July 1935) is an American theoretical linguist who is an authority on the history and structure of the English language and on linguistic approaches to literary criticism.

== Biography ==
Keyser received a BA degree in English from George Washington University in 1956, a BA in 1958 (MA 1962) in English from Merton College, Oxford University, another MA, in linguistics, from Yale University in 1960, and a PhD in linguistics from Yale in 1962. He is Peter de Florez Emeritus Professor, an emeritus member of the Linguistics and Philosophy faculty, and former Associate Provost at MIT. He has authored numerous books and scientific publications, and is Editor-in-chief of the journal Linguistic Inquiry.

In addition to his contributions in many fields of linguistics, including phonology, generative metrics, and lexical structure, he is well known to jazz fans throughout the Boston area as an accomplished trombonist and bandleader.

Keyser married Margaret Horridge in 1959. Divorced in 1993, he married Nancy Dean Kelly in 2001.

== Selected bibliography ==
- (With George Clements) C.V. Phonology: A Generative Theory of the Syllable (Linguistic Inquiry Monographs) (MIT Press, 1983)
- (With Ken Hale) Prolegomenon to a Theory of Argument Structure (MIT Press, 2002)
- (With Wayne O'Neill) Rule Generalization and Optionality in Language Change (De Gruyter Mouton, 2015)
