= Studia Linguistica =

- Discipline: General linguistics
- Language: English
- Edited by: Christer Platzack, Arthur Holmer

Publication details
- History: 1947–present
- Publisher: Wiley-Blackwell
- Frequency: Triannual

Standard abbreviations
- ISO 4: Stud. Linguist.

Indexing
- ISSN: 0039-3193 (print); 1467-9582 (web)

Links
- Journal homepage; Online access

Studia Linguistica: A Journal of General Linguistics is a peer-reviewed academic journal of general linguistics established in 1947 and currently published by Wiley-Blackwell. Its current editors-in-chief are Christer Platzack (Lund University) and Arthur Holmer.
