= List of presidents of the Linguistic Society of America =

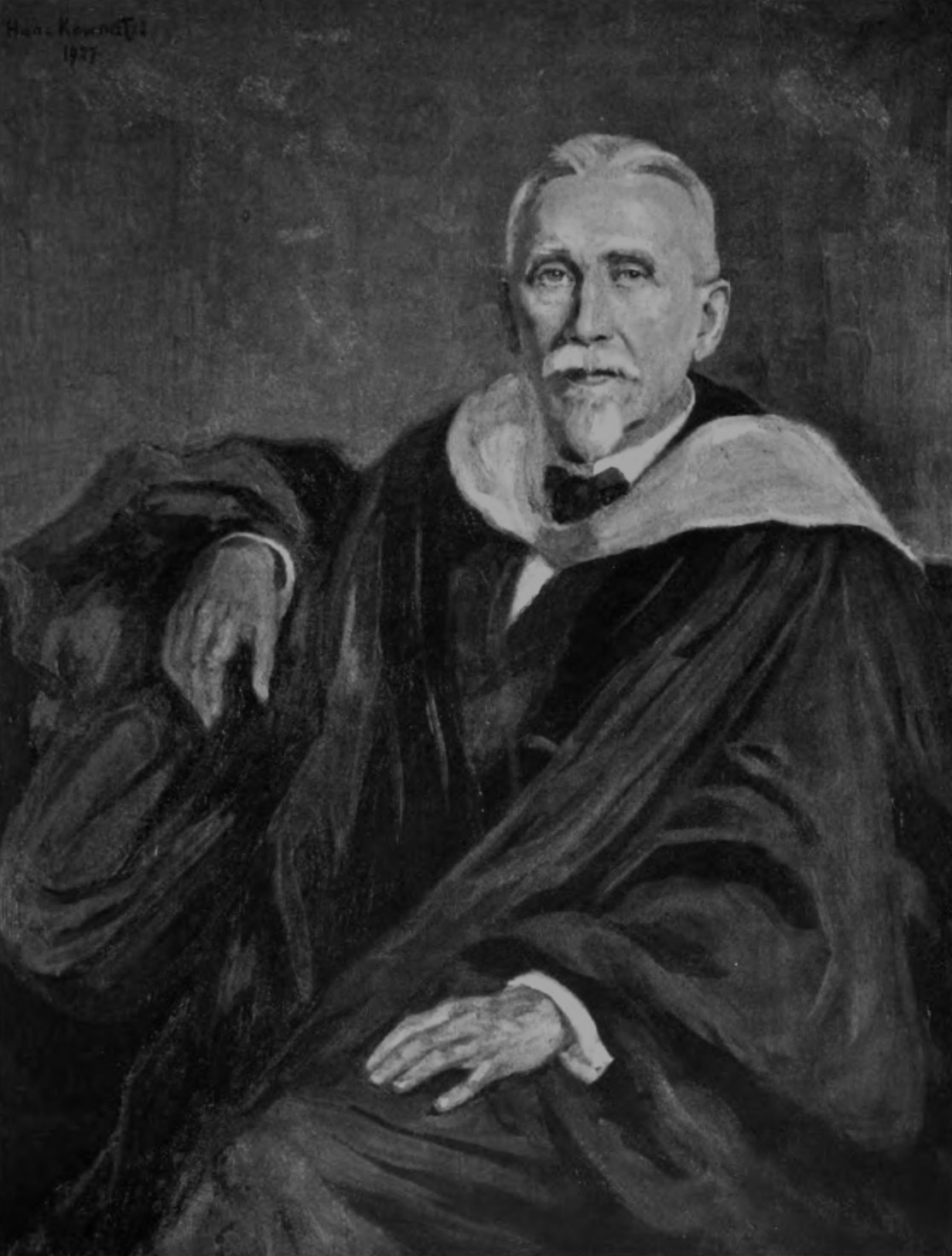
Hermann Collitz, the first president of the Linguistic Society of America

The Linguistic Society of America (LSA) is a learned society for linguistics founded in December 1924. At the first meeting, the LSA membership elected Hermann Collitz as their first president. Since then, there have been 102 presidencies, with 101 different presidents. (Note: Carl Darling Buck is the only person to serve twice as president, in 1927 and 1937) Under the constitution and bylaws of the organization, the president of the LSA serves for a one-year term. The president serves as chair of the executive committee and has the power to appoint a number of positions subject to executive committee approval.

The president serves for one year. A candidate is elected by the membership as vice-president of the LSA which also carries the distinction of president-elect. The candidate serves as vice-president for one year and then assumes the office of president at the end of the annual meeting. The candidate then serves as president for one year. Upon leaving the office, the former president serves a one-year term on the executive committee. Should the sitting president prematurely leave office, the previous president completes the term.

== List ==
- 1925: Hermann Collitz
- 1926: Maurice Bloomfield
- 1927: Carl Darling Buck
- 1928: Franz Boas
- 1929: Charles H. Grandgent
- 1930: Eduard Prokosch
- 1931: Edgar H. Sturtevant
- 1932: George Melville Bolling
- 1933: Edward Sapir
- 1934: Franklin Edgerton
- 1935: Leonard Bloomfield
- 1936: George T. Flom
- 1937: Carl Darling Buck
- 1938: Louis Herbert Gray
- 1939: Charles C. Fries
- 1940: Alfred Kroeber
- 1941: Roland Grubb Kent
- 1942: Hans Kurath
- 1943: Fred N. Robinson
- 1944: Kemp Malone
- 1945: Yuen Ren Chao
- 1946: E. Adelaide Hahn
- 1947: Albrecht Goetze
- 1948: Hayward Keniston
- 1949: Murray B. Emeneau
- 1950: Einar Haugen
- 1951: Joshua Whatmough
- 1952: George S. Lane
- 1953: Bernard Bloch
- 1954: Charles F. Voegelin
- 1955: Zellig Harris
- 1956: Roman Jakobson
- 1957: W. Freeman Twaddell
- 1958: Henry M. Hoenigswald
- 1959: Harry Hoijer
- 1960: George L. Trager
- 1961: Kenneth L. Pike
- 1962: Albert H. Marckwardt
- 1963: Mary R. Haas
- 1964: Charles Hockett
- 1965: Yakov Malkiel
- 1966: J. Milton Cowan
- 1967: William G. Moulton
- 1968: Eugene A. Nida
- 1969: Archibald A. Hill
- 1970: Charles A. Ferguson
- 1971: Eric P. Hamp
- 1972: Dwight L. Bolinger
- 1973: Winfred P. Lehmann
- 1974: Morris Halle
- 1975: Thomas A. Sebeok
- 1976: Rulon S. Wells
- 1977: Joseph H. Greenberg
- 1978: Peter Ladefoged
- 1979: William Labov
- 1980: Ilse Lehiste
- 1981: Fred W. Householder
- 1982: Dell H. Hymes
- 1983: Arthur S. Abramson
- 1984: Henry R. Kahane
- 1985: Victoria A. Fromkin
- 1986: Barbara H. Partee
- 1987: Elizabeth C. Traugott
- 1988: Calvert Watkins
- 1989: William Bright
- 1990: Robert Austerlitz
- 1991: Charles J. Fillmore
- 1992: Arnold M. Zwicky
- 1993: Lila R. Gleitman
- 1994: Kenneth L. Hale
- 1995: Emmon Bach
- 1996: James D. McCawley
- 1997: Janet Dean Fodor
- 1998: D. Terence Langendoen
- 1999: Joan Bresnan
- 2000: David Perlmutter
- 2001: Walt Wolfram
- 2002: Frederick J. Newmeyer
- 2003: Ray Jackendoff
- 2004: Joan Bybee
- 2005: Mark Aronoff
- 2006: Sally McConnell-Ginet
- 2007: Stephen R. Anderson
- 2008: Ellen Prince
- 2009: Sarah Thomason
- 2010: David Lightfoot
- 2011: Sandra Chung
- 2012: Keren Rice
- 2013: Ellen Kaisse
- 2014: Joan Maling
- 2015: John Rickford
- 2016: Alice Harris
- 2017: Larry Hyman
- 2018: Penelope Eckert
- 2019: Brian Joseph
- 2020: Marianne Mithun
- 2021: Laurence Horn
- 2022: John Baugh
- 2023: Anthony C. Woodbury
- 2024: Marlyse Baptista
- 2025: Heidi Harley
- 2026: Alicia Beckford Wassink

== See also ==
- List of presidents of the American Philological Association
