= Sarah T. Barrows =

American phonetician

Sarah Tracy Barrows (October 21, 1870, Hudson, Ohio – 1952, Contra Costa, California) was an American phonetician. She was best known for her pioneering work on the phonetics of American English pronunciation and her many applied phonetics publications aimed at public school teachers (1926), speech therapists (1927), actors (1935, 1938) and immigrants learning English (Barrows 1918, 1922).

== Education and career ==
Sarah T. Barrows received her B.L. from Iowa State College in 1891 and her M.A. from Cornell in 1893. She received a certificate of proficiency in phonetics from the University of Marburg in (1908). She continued her studies in phonetics at the University of Hamburg (1914) and the Ludwig-Maximilians-Universität München (1915).

Barrows held a number of academic positions during the course of her career. She was an assistant professor of German at the Ohio State University from 1907/1908 until 1919/1920. She was the Director of Teaching English to Foreigners at the San Francisco State Teachers' College from 1920 to 1923. As part of an immigrant education program there, she helped develop a handbook for teachers of immigrants for the California Department of Public Instruction, Division of Immigrant Education, called English Pronunciation for Foreigners (Barrows 1922). The booklet contains techniques for teaching English-language pronunciation to recent immigrants, specifically those with Italian, Spanish, Scandinavian, Slavic, Japanese, and Chinese language backgrounds. In 1924 she was hired to teach phonetics and supervise a speech clinic by the newly formed Speech Department at Iowa State University, one of the first ones founded in the United States. Her being hired to this position is considered a landmark in the development of the scientific study and treatment of speech disorders. In 1928 she moved to San Jose State College, where she taught until 1930. She appears to have regularly taught phonetics at summer sessions at the University of California-Berkeley from 1928 through, at least, 1943. By 1949 she was retired and living in Saratoga, California.

== Notable achievements ==
Sarah T. Barrows was one of the Foundation Members of the Linguistic Society of America. She was one of only 31 women out of a group of 264 Foundation Members, and she was one of only 3 of the women Foundation Members to hold a position at an AAU (Association of American Universities) member institution (University of Iowa). She remained a member of the Linguistic Society of America until 1927.

She was the first woman to have a publication in the Linguistic Society of America's organ, Language (Barrows 1926). Hers is the only book review by a woman in the journal's first 20 volumes.

== Selected works ==
- Barrows, S. T. (1916). Experimental phonetics as an aid to the study of language. Pedagogical Seminary, 23, 63–75.
- Barrows, S. T. (1918). English sounds for foreign tongues, a drill book. Columbus: the Ohio State University.
- Barrows, S. T. (1922). The foreign child and his speech handicap. Educational Review, 64, 367–376.
- Barrows, S. T. (1922). English pronunciation for foreigners. Sacramento: California State Printing Office. (A 35-page pamphlet, published by the Superintendent of Public Instruction of California, Division of Immigrant Education.)
- Barrows, S. T. (1926). Book review of Helen Pappard's The Correction of Speech Defects. Language, 2, issue 4, 252–253.
- Barrows, S. T., & Cordts, A. (1926). The teacher's book of phonetics. NY: Ginn & Company.
- Barrows, S. T. & Mills, Alice (1926). Voice and articulation. Iowa City, IA: State University of Iowa, Department of Speech.
- Barrows, S. T. & Hall, K. H. (1926/1936) Games and jingles for speech development. Boston: Expression Co.
- Barrows, S. T. (1927). Phonetics as a dispeller of illusions. Journal of Expression, 1, 113–118. (On the necessity of considering the use of the vocal mechanism in sound production before beginning speech therapy.)
- Barrows, S. T. (1927). A survey of phonetics in colleges and universities in the United States. Quarterly Journal of Speech Education, 13, 264–268.
- Case, Ida Mae Barrows, Sarah T. (1929, 1990). Speech drills for children in the form of play. Boston: Expression Co.
- Barrows, S. T. (1929). Watch, water, wash. American Speech, 4, 301–302. (On the pronunciation of these words in different dialects.)
- Barrows, S. T. (1929). Phonetic training for teachers of phonics for primary grades. Grade Teacher, 47, 26–27.
- Barrows, S. T. (1930, 1938). Introduction to the phonetic alphabet; analysis of the spoken word. NY: The Expression Co. (on hathitrust.org)
- Barrows, S. T. & Hall, Katharine, H. (1930). Jack in the box. Adapted from drawings by primary children in Oakland and Sebastopol, California. Boston, MA: The Expression Company
- Barrows, S. T. (1932). Why the teacher of speech needs phonetic training. Theatre and School, 10, 15–20.
- Barrows, S. T. & Pierce, Anne E. (1933). Voice: How to use it. With exercises for tone and articulation. Boston, MA: The Expression Co.
- Barrows, S. T. (1933). Why phonetics? Good Speech (London). 3, 1–5.
- Barrows, S. T. (trans from German) (1935) Psychology of acting; a consideration of its principles as an art, by Lorenz Kjerbuhl-Petersen. Boston, MA: The Expression Co.
- Barrows, S. T. & Hall, Alta Bell (1936) An American phonetic reader. Boston, MA: Expression Company.
- Barrows, S. T. (1938). Voice: How to use it. Boston, MA: Expression Co.
- Barrows, S. T. (nd). English speech for foreign tongues. Columbus, OH: U.S. council of National Defense. (an 11-page pamphlet).
