= Andries Coetzee (linguist) =

South African linguist

- Born: South Africa
- Occupations: Linguist; professor

Academic background
- Education: North-West University (B.A., M.A.); University of Massachusetts Amherst (Ph.D.)

Andries W. Coetzee (Afrikaans pronunciation: [ˈɑndris kutˈsiə]) is the Judith T. Irvine Collegiate Professor of Linguistics at the University of Michigan, where he also serves as the Provost's Senior Advisor on African Engagement, as the Director of International Partnerships in the College of Literature, Science and the Arts. He also formerly served as Director of the African Studies Center (2019–2022). Coetzee grew up in South Africa, and after completing an MA degree in Semitic Languages at the North-West University in South Africa, he earned PhD in Linguistics from the University of Massachusetts Amherst in 2004. He has been a major contributor in research in the fields of Phonetics and Phonology. His career has been spent teaching in South Africa and at the University of Michigan, and being heavily involved with the Linguistics Institute of the Linguistic Society of America. In 2011 he received the first ever Early Career Award from the Linguistic Society of America, and in 2015 was inducted as a fellow of this Society.

== Early career ==
Andries Coetzee began his education at the North-West University, South Africa. He received a BA in Classics and Semitics, and a BA honors in Semitic Languages as well as Theology. After earning a master's degree in Semitic Languages in 1996 from the North-West University, he moved to the University of Massachusetts Amherst where he earned a Ph.D. in Linguistics in 2004, with a dissertation titled What It Means to be a Loser: Non-Optimal Candidates in Optimality Theory. After finishing his education he began working at the University of Michigan.

== Current work ==
Coetzee served on the editorial board member of Phonology until 2018, and as Editor of Language (2017–2022), the flagship journal of the Linguistic Society of America. He teaches both undergraduate and graduate students Phonology, as well as many introductory courses in Linguistics. He has overseen many undergraduate and graduate students as they work on their projects, whether it be an honors thesis or a dissertation. His own current research is focused on the time course of speech perception and production in individual language users. He is also working on a project with colleague Patrice Beddor, which focuses on the hypothesis that a language user's perception and production repertoires or grammars are complexly related in ways that are mediated by wide-ranging factors. Coetzee served as the Director of the African Studies Center at the University from 2018 to 2022.
