= Henry R. Kahane =

German-born American linguist (1902–1992)

- Kahane in 1986
- Born: 2 November 1902; Berlin, German Empire
- Died: 11 September 1992 (aged 89); Urbana, Illinois, U.S.
- Spouse: Renée Toole (m. 1931)

Academic background
- Education: Humboldt University of Berlin
- Doctoral advisor: Ernst Gamillscheg

Academic work
- Discipline: Romance linguistics

Henry R. Kahane (2 November 1902 in Berlin – 11 September 1992 in Urbana, Illinois) was a German-born American Romance philologist and linguist. His father was the Berlin literary figure, Arthur Kahane, a close collaborator of Max Reinhardt. In 1931 he married Renée Toole, who he met when they were both PhD students in Berlin. She became his lifelong intellectual partner.

== Career ==
Kahane studied Romance philology in Germany under Ernst Gamillscheg (1880–1962) and Gerhard Rohlfs (1892–1986), receiving his PhD in 1930 under the supervision of Gamillscheg at the Humboldt University of Berlin.

After obtaining their PhDs, Henry and Renée Kahane moved to Florence and spent several years collecting a large corpus of Venetian loanwords used in Greek dialects. Henry Kahane also served as a teacher and later principal of a school for the children of German refugees in Florence. Following Henry's brief imprisonment in Florence by Mussolini as part of a general round up of immigrant Jews, the Kahanes moved to Cephalonia, Greece, Renée Kahane's birthplace. They managed to emigrate to the US in 1939. From 1939 to 1941 Henry Kahane worked as a research assistant in comparative literature at the University of Southern California, Los Angeles. In 1941 he took up a position at the University of Illinois in the department of Spanish, Italian, and Portuguese. In 1965 he founded the Department of Linguistics at the University of Illinois and became the department's first head, a position he held until his retirement in 1971. A Festschrift in honor of Henry R. and Renée Kahane was published by the University of Illinois Press in 1973.

Henry and Renée Kahane are estimated to have had a scholarly output of at least a dozen books and well over one hundred and fifty other publications dealing with various aspects of literary history and linguistics, such as etymology, Romance and Mediterranean lexicography, stylistics, morphology, and dialectology. Beginning in the 1960s their particular focus became the investigation and recovery of the Hellenic heritage to the West, including a sociolinguistic study of the relations between Byzantium and the West told through the reciprocal borrowings of words.

== Honors ==
Henry Kahane was awarded Guggenheim Fellowships in 1955 and in 1962 and served as President of the Linguistic Society of America in 1984.

Henry and Renee Kahane were awarded Bicentennial Gold Medals by the Georgetown University Linguistics Department in 1989 in recognition of their lifelong contributions to the field of Romance linguistics.

== See also ==
- List of presidents of the Linguistic Society of America

== Selected works ==
- Kahane, Henry R.; Kahane, Renée. "Religious Key Terms in Hellenism and Byzantium: Three Facets." Illinois Classical Studies, 12:2, Byzantium and its Legacy (Fall 1987), pp. 243–263.
- Kahane, Henry R. "A Typology of the Prestige Language." Language, 62:3 (September, 1986), pp. 495–508.
- Kahane, Henry R.; Kahane, Renée. "Humanistic Linguistics." Journal of Aesthetic Education, 17:4, Special Issue: Distinguished Humanities Lectures (Winter 1983), pp. 65–89.
- Kahane, Henry R.; Kahane, Renée. "Byzantium's Impact on the West: The Linguistic Evidence." Illinois Classical Studies, 6:2 (Fall 1981), pp. 389–415. <https://www.ideals.illinois.edu/items/17235>
- Kahane, Henry R.; Kahane, Renée; Ash, Roberta. "Linguistic Evidence in Historical Reconstruction." Linguistic Method. Essays in Honor of Herbert Penzl. Berlin: De Gruyter Mouton, 1979: 67-121. doi:10.1515/9783110815665-008
- Kahane, Henry R.; Kahane, Renée. "Virtues and Vices in the American Language: A History of Attitudes." TESOL Quarterly, 11:2 (June, 1977), pp. 185–202. doi:10.2307/3585454
- Kahane, Henry R.; Kahane, Renée. Abendland und Byzanz: Sprache, Amsterdam: Adolf M. Hakkert, 1976.
- Kahane, Henry R. "Max Reinhardt's Total Theatre: A Centenary Lecture." Comparative Literature Studies, 12:3 (September, 1975), pp. 323–337.
- Kahane, Henry R.; Kahane, Renée, Lucille Bremner. Glossario degli antichi portolani italiani, Florence: Olschki, 1967.
- Kahane, Henry and Renée (1965). Angelina Pietrangeli: The Krater and the Grail: Hermetic Sources of the Parzival. Urbana: University of Illinois. .
- Kahane, Henry R.; Kahane, Renée. "Germanic Derivations of Romance Words." Journal of English and Germanic Philology, 60:3 (July, 1961), pp. 460–476.
- Kahane, Henry R.; Kahane, Renée. Animalia Pyrricha. Göttingen: Vandenhoeck et Ruprecht, 1960.
- Kahane, Henry R.; Kahane, Renée. Magic and Gnosticism in the "Chanson de Roland". Oakland, CA: University of California Press, 1959.
- Kahane, Henry R.; Kahane, Renée. The System of the Verb in the Western Languages. Tübingen: Max Niemeyer, 1957.
- Sánchez Ruipérez, Martin.; Kahane, Henry R. (review). Estructura del sistema de aspectos y tiempos del verbo griego antiguo: análisis funcional sincrónico. Salamanca: Colegio Trilingüe de la Universidad, 1954.
- Kahane, Henry R. Principles of Comparative Syntax. Louvain: International Agency for Dialectology General, 1954.
- Kahane, Henry R.; Hutter, Hariett S. "The Verbal Categories of Colloquial Brazilian Portuguese". Word, 9:1 (1953), pp. 16–44. doi:10.1080/00437956.1953.11659454
- Kahane, Henry R.; Saporta, Sol. "The Verbal Categories of Judeo-Spanish, Parts 1–2". Hispanic Review. Vol. 21, No. 4 (Oct., 1953), pp. 322–336. doi:10.2307/470639
- Kahane, Henry R.; Kahane, Renée. Mediterranean Words. 1952.
- Kahane, Henry R.; Kahane, Renée. "The Mediterranean Term 'Surgere' to 'Anchor'". Romance Philology Vol. 4, No. 2/3 (Nov, 1950 - Feb, 1951), pp. 195–215.
- Kahane, Henry R.; Kahane, Renée. "The Position of the Actor Expression in Colloquial Mexican Spanish." Language, Vol. 26, No. 2 (Apr.- June, 1950), pp. 236–263. doi:10.2307/410060
- Kahane, Henry R.; Kahane, Renée. The Augmentative Feminine in the Romance Languages. Oakland, CA: University of California Press, 1949.
- Kahane, Henry R.; Beym, Richard. "Syntactical juncture in colloquial Mexican Spanish". Language, 24:4, (1948) pp. 388–396. doi:10.2307/410355
