= Renée Kahane =

Greek-born American linguist (1907–2002)

- Kahane in 1986
- Born: Renée Toole; December 9, 1907; Argostolion, Greece
- Died: December 10, 2002 (aged 95); Chicago, Illinois, U.S.

Academic background
- Education: Humboldt University of Berlin

Academic work
- Discipline: Romance linguistics

Renée Kahane (née Toole; 9 December 1907 in Argostolion, Greece – 10 December 2002 in Chicago) was a Greek-born American philologist and linguist of the Romance languages

== Career ==
Renée Toole Kahane studied Romance philology at the Universities of Leipzig and Berlin, receiving her PhD in 1931 under the supervision of Ernst Gamillscheg. In 1931, she married Henry R. Kahane, whom she had met in 1927 when they were fellow PhD students in Berlin. They became lifelong intellectual partners.

After obtaining their PhDs, Henry and Renée Kahane moved to Florence where they spent several years collecting a large corpus of Venetian loanwords used in Greek dialects. Following Henry's brief imprisonment in Florence by Mussolini as part of a general round up of immigrant Jews, the Kahanes moved to Cephalonia, Greece, Renée Kahane's birthplace. From there they managed to emigrate to the US in 1939. From 1939 to 1941 they lived in Los Angeles. In 1941 they moved to the University of Illinois when Henry took up a position, first, in the department of Spanish, Italian, and Portuguese and then in the department of Linguistics (which he founded). They stayed there for the remainder of their careers. A Festschift in honor of Henry and Renée Kahane was published by the University of Illinois Press in 1973.

Henry and Renée Kahane are estimated to have had a scholarly output of at least a dozen books and well over one hundred and fifty other publications dealing with various aspects of literary history and linguistics, such as etymology, Romance and Mediterranean lexicography, stylistics, morphology, and dialectology. Beginning in the 1960s their particular focus became the investigation and recovery of the Hellenic heritage to the West, including a sociolinguistic study of the relations between Byzantium and the West told through the reciprocal borrowings of words.

== Honors ==
Henry and Renée Kahane were awarded Bicentennial Gold Medals by the Georgetown University Linguistics Department in 1989 in recognition of their lifetime contributions to the field of Romance linguistics.

Henry and Renée Kahane were awarded honorary doctorates from the University of Illinois at Urbana-Champaign in 1977 and the Freie Universität-Berlin in 1988. Renée Kahane's doctorate from the University of Berlin was restored to her in 1984.

== Selected works ==
- Kahane, Renée. Wortgeschichtliche Studien, "toupin" und "bronze", Berliner Beiträge zur Romanischen Philologie, III, 4, Jena-Leipzig 1934.
- Kahane, Henry R.; Kahane, Renée, Italienische Ortsnamen in Griechenland, Texte und Forschungen zur byzantinisch-neugriechischen Philologie 36, Athen 1940.
- Kahane, Henry R.; Kahane, Renée, Ralph L. Ward, Spoken Greek, 2 vols., New York: Henry Holt & Co., 1945 - 46.
- Kahane, Henry R.; Kahane, Renée. The Augmentative Feminine in the Romance Languages. Oakland, CA: University of California Press, 1949.
- Kahane, Henry R.; Kahane, Renée. The Position of the Actor Expression in Colloquial Mexican Spanish. Language 26, 236–263, 1950.
- Kahane, Henry R.; Kahane, Renée. The Mediterranean Term Surgere "to Anchor". Oakland, CA: University of California Press, 1951.
- Kahane, Henry R.; Kahane, Renée. Mediterranean Words. Romance Philology V: 174–80. 1951–1952.
- Kahane, Henry R.; Kahane, Renée. The System of the Verb in the Western Languages. Tübingen: Max Niemeyer, 1957.
- Kahane, Henry R.; Kahane, Renée. Magic and Gnosticism in the "Chanson de Roland". Oakland, CA: University of California Press, 1959.
- Kahane, Henry R.; Kahane, Renée, Andreas Tietze, The Lingua Franca in the Levant: Turkish Nautical Terms of Italian and Greek Origin, Urbana: University of Illinois Press, 1958.
- Kahane, Henry R.; Kahane, Renée. Animalia Pyrricha. Göttingen: Vandenhoeck et Ruprecht, 1960.
- Kahane, Henry R.; Kahane, Renée. "Germanic Derivations of Romance Words." Journal of English and Germanic Philology, 60:3 (July, 1961), pp. 460–476.
- Kahane, Henry and Renée (1965). Angelina Pietrangeli: The Krater and the Grail: Hermetic Sources of the Parzival. Urbana: University of Illinois. .
- Kahane, Henry R.; Kahane, Renée; Bremner, Lucille. Glossario degli antichi portolani italiani, Florence: Olschki, 1967.
- Kahane, Henry R.; Kahane, Renée. Abendland und Byzanz: Sprache, Amsterdam: Adolf M. Hakkert, 1976.
- Kahane, Henry R.; Kahane, Renée. "Virtues and Vices in the American Language: A History of Attitudes." TESOL Quarterly, 11:2 (June, 1977), pp. 185–202. doi:10.2307/3585454
- Kahane, Henry R.; Kahane, Renée; Ash, Roberta. "Linguistic Evidence in Historical Reconstruction." Linguistic Method. Essays in Honor of Herbert Penzl. Eds. Irmengard Rauch and Gerald F. Carr. Berlin: De Gruyter Mouton, 1979: 67–121. doi:10.1515/9783110815665-008
- Kahane, Henry R.; Kahane, Renée. "Byzantium's Impact on the West: The Linguistic Evidence." Illinois Classical Studies, 6:2 (Fall 1981), pp. 389–415.
- Kahane, Henry R.; Kahane, Renée. "Humanistic Linguistics." Journal of Aesthetic Education, 17:4, Special Issue: Distinguished Humanities Lectures (Winter 1983), pp. 65–89.
- Kahane, Henry R. "A Typology of the Prestige Language." Language, 62:3 (September, 1986), pp. 495–508.
- Kahane, Henry R.; Kahane, Renée. "Religious Key Terms in Hellenism and Byzantium: Three Facets." Illinois Classical Studies, 12:2, Byzantium and its Legacy (Fall 1987), pp. 243–263.
