= Alice Harris (linguist) =

American linguist and caucasologist (b. 1947)

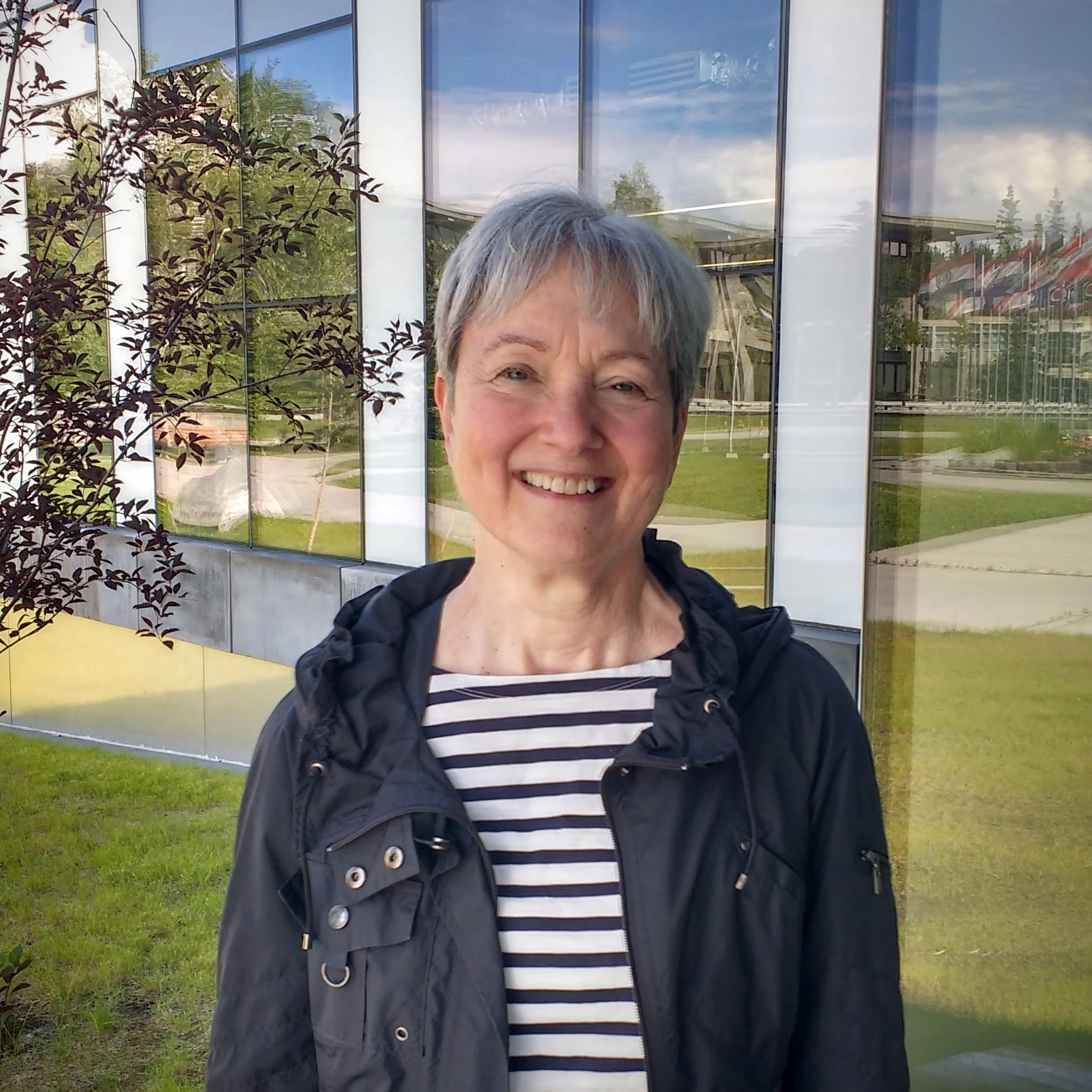
- Born: November 23, 1947 (age 78)
- Education: Harvard University (PhD)
- Scientific career
- Fields: Linguistics

Alice Carmichael Harris (born November 23, 1947) is an American linguist. She is Professor emerita of Linguistics at the University of Massachusetts Amherst.

== Research ==
Citing an early interest in the "systematic, almost mathematical aspects of languages," Harris began investigating ergativity in graduate school, and in doing so began to study the Georgian language. She was one of the first Americans allowed to do research in the Republic of Georgia when it was still part of the Soviet Union. She has continued to work in this region, looking at different characteristics of Georgian, Laz, Svan, Mingrelian, Udi, and Batsbi.

Harris also has a strong interest in promoting the larger topic of documenting endangered languages. She played a key role in establishing the Documenting Endangered Languages (DEL) Program, a granting sub-unit that is part of the National Science Foundation.

== Career ==
Harris received her Ph.D. in Linguistics from Harvard University in 1976 after studying at Randolph-Macon Woman's College, the University of Glasgow and the University of Essex.

She taught at Vanderbilt University from 1979 to 2002, serving as the department chair of Germanic and Slavic Languages there from 1993 to 2002. She was Professor of Linguistics at SUNY Stony Brook from 2002 to 2009, before taking up a position at the University of Massachusetts, Amherst in 2009 where she remained until her retirement in 2020.

== Awards ==
- Harris won the Leonard Bloomfield Book Award from the LSA in 1998 along with Lyle Campbell, for the book Historical Syntax in Cross-Linguistic Perspective (1995).
- Harris received a Guggenheim Fellowship in 2009.
- She was elected a Fellow of the Linguistic Society of America in 2012.
- She served as President of the Linguistic Society of America in 2016.
- Harris was elected Fellow of the British Academy in July 2020.

== Publications ==
- 1981. Georgian Syntax: A Study in Relational Grammar. Cambridge: Cambridge University Press. Reprint published 2009.
- 1982. "Georgian and the unaccusative hypothesis." Language.
- 1985. Diachronic Syntax: The Kartvelian Case (Syntax and Semantics, 18). New York: Academic Press.
- 1991. "Mingrelian." The indigenous languages of the Caucasus. Volume 1: The Kartvelian languages, 313–394. Delmar, New York: Caravan Books.
- 1995. Alice C. Harris and Lyle Campbell. Historical Syntax in Cross-Linguistic Perspective. Cambridge University Press. [Leonard Bloomfield Book Award 1998. Chinese translation published in 2007.]
- 2000. "Where in the word is the Udi clitic?" Language.
- 2002. Endoclitics and the Origins of Udi Morphosyntax. Oxford: Oxford University Press.
- 2003. "Cross-linguistic Perspectives on linguistic change." The Handbook of Historical Linguistics.
- 2008. "Reconstruction in syntax: reconstruction of patterns." Principles of syntactic reconstruction. G. Ferraresi, and M. Goldbach, eds. John Benjamins.
- 2017. Multiple Exponence. Oxford: Oxford University Press.
