= William Moulton =

William Moulton may refer to:

- William Fiddian Moulton, English Methodist minister, biblical scholar and educator
- William C. Moulton, member of the Massachusetts Senate
- William G. Moulton, American linguist
- William Moulton (bowls) (born 2000), English bowls player

== See also ==
- William Moulton Marston, American psychologist and comic book writer who created the character Wonder Woman
