= Marlyse Baptista =

Senegalese-born Cabo Verdean–French linguist

Marlyse Baptista is a linguist specialized in the morphology and syntax of pidgin and creole languages. She uses descriptive, theoretical, and experimental methods to study these contact languages. Until 2022, Baptista was the Uriel Weinreich Collegiate Professor of Linguistics at the University of Michigan, and now holds the position of President's Distinguished Professor of Linguistics in the Department of Linguistics at the University of Pennsylvania.

== Biography ==
Baptista's parents are from Cape Verde, she was born in Senegal and she grew up in France as part of the Cape Verdean diaspora. After studying for a licence and then an MA in Anglophone literatures and civilizations at the Université de Bordeaux III, she moved to the United States where she first studied at the University of Massachusetts in Boston. Her subsequent studies took place at Harvard University, where she completed a PhD in linguistics, awarded in 1997.

Post-PhD, she spent a year as a visiting scholar in the Department of Linguistics and Philosophy at MIT. From 1998 to 2007 she was first assistant professor then associate professor of linguistics at the University of Georgia. In 2007 she moved to the University of Michigan to take up a position as associate professor of linguistics and Afroamerican and African studies. She was promoted to full professor in 2011 and took up an endowed chair in 2019. She now has an endowed chair at the University of Pennsylvania.

== Honors ==
Since 2017 she has been a Fellow of the Linguistic Society of America (LSA). She served on the Executive Committee of the LSA from 2018–2020. She was elected President of the Linguistic Society of America for 2024. She is also a past President (2011–2015) of the Society for Pidgin and Creole Linguistics. In 2025, she became a Fellow of the American Association for the Advancement of Science.

== Research ==
Baptista's work has focused on the morphosyntax of pidgin and creole languages. She has conducted extensive fieldwork in the Cape Verdean archipelago, particularly on Cape Verdean Creole. In current research she is investigating the cognitive underpinnings of language contact situations, particularly the role of congruence in second language acquisition, bilingualism, and the origins and development of creoles. She has also collaborated with geneticists to gain a better understanding of the founding population of Cape Verde using field data and DNA.

== Selected publications ==
- Baptista, Marlyse. 2002. The syntax of Cape Verdean Creole: the Sotavento varieties. Amsterdam: John Benjamins. ISBN 9781588112903
- Baptista, Marlyse. 2005. New directions in pidgin and creole studies. Annual Review of Anthropology 34, 33–42.
- Baptista, Marlyse, and Jacqueline Guéron (eds.). 2007. Noun phrases in creole languages: a multi-faceted approach. Amsterdam: John Benjamins. ISBN 9789027252531
- Baptista, Marlyse. 2007. On the syntax and semantics of DP in Cape Verdean Creole. In Baptista and Guéron (eds.), 61–105.
- Obata, Miki, Samuel D. Epstein, and Marlyse Baptista. 2015. Can crosslinguistically variant grammars be formally identical? Third factor underspecification and the possible elimination of parameters of UG. Lingua 156, 1–16.
- Verdu, Paul, Ethan M. Jewett, Trevor J. Pemberton, Noah A. Rosenberg, and Marlyse Baptista. 2017. Parallel Trajectories of Genetic and Linguistic Admixture in a Genetically Admixed Creole Population. Current Biology 27 (16), 2529–2535.e3.
