= Edit Doron =

Israeli academic (1951–2019)

- עידית דורון
- Born: April 9, 1951; Jerusalem
- Died: 27 March 2019 (aged 67); Jerusalem
- Education: Hebrew University of Jerusalem, University of Texas at Austin(Ph.D., 1983)
- Occupations: Professor, Hebrew University of Jerusalem
- Known for: Israel Prize Award

Edit Doron (Hebrew: עידית דורון; April 9, 1951 – March 27, 2019) was an Israeli academic specializing in linguistics.

== Personal life and education ==
Doron was born in Jerusalem. Her father emigrated from Turkey to British Mandate Palestine in 1935, after his family was expelled from its home in Gallipoli. Her mother was born in British Mandate Palestine.

She studied in the Hebrew University Secondary School, and later completed BA and MA in math in the Hebrew University of Jerusalem. She earned a PhD in Linguistics from the University of Texas at Austin in 1983. From 1984 to 1985 she held a post-doctoral fellowship at Stanford University.

Doron died of cancer on March 27, 2019, aged 67.

== Career ==
Doron was a professor in the Department of Linguistics and Language, Logic and Cognition Center in the Faculty of Humanities at the Hebrew University of Jerusalem. Doron's research in general linguistics focuses in particular on Hebrew, Arabic, Aramaic, English and French. She published many articles on the interface of semantics, morphology and syntax.

Doron was President of the Israel Association for Theoretical Linguistics from 2008 to 2010. She served as co-director of the joint Hebrew University and Tel-Aviv University structured Linguistics PhD program.

== Israel Prize ==
Doron was awarded the Israel Prize in on May 11, 2016 for her work on general linguistics and Hebrew. In particular she was recognized for comparative analysis between modern and biblical Hebrew that are considered groundbreaking. The Israel Prize (Hebrew: פרס ישראל) is an award handed out by the State of Israel and is generally regarded as the state's highest honor. It is presented annually, on Israeli Independence Day, in a state ceremony in Jerusalem, in the presence of the President, the Prime Minister, the Speaker of the Knesset (Israel's legislature), and the Supreme Court President.
