= Kenneth Keniston =

American social psychologist (1930–2020)

Kenneth Keniston (January 6, 1930 – February 14, 2020) was an American social psychologist.

Keniston was born in Chicago, and attended secondary school abroad, at the Colegio Nacional de Buenos Aires. He enrolled in Harvard College, and later earned a Rhodes Scholarship to complete his D. Phil in social studies from Balliol College, Oxford. Keniston taught at Harvard University and Yale University before joining the Massachusetts Institute of Technology faculty in 1977, where he served as the Andrew W. Mellon Professor of Human Development. Keniston and his wife Suzanne Berger both received a Guggenheim Fellowship in 1979. Keniston's father Hayward Keniston received a Guggenheim Fellowship in 1953, and his sister Marjorie McIntosh was awarded one in 1995. Keniston died after a long illness on February 14, 2020.

== Books ==
The Uncommitted: Alienated Youth in American Society (1965)
