= Reena Ninan =

American news anchor (born 1979)

- Born: April 18, 1979 (age 47); Tampa, Florida, U.S.
- Education: George Washington University (B.A., Political Communication, 2001)
- Occupations: Journalist, news anchor
- Years active: 1999–present
- Spouse: Kevin Peraino
- Children: 2

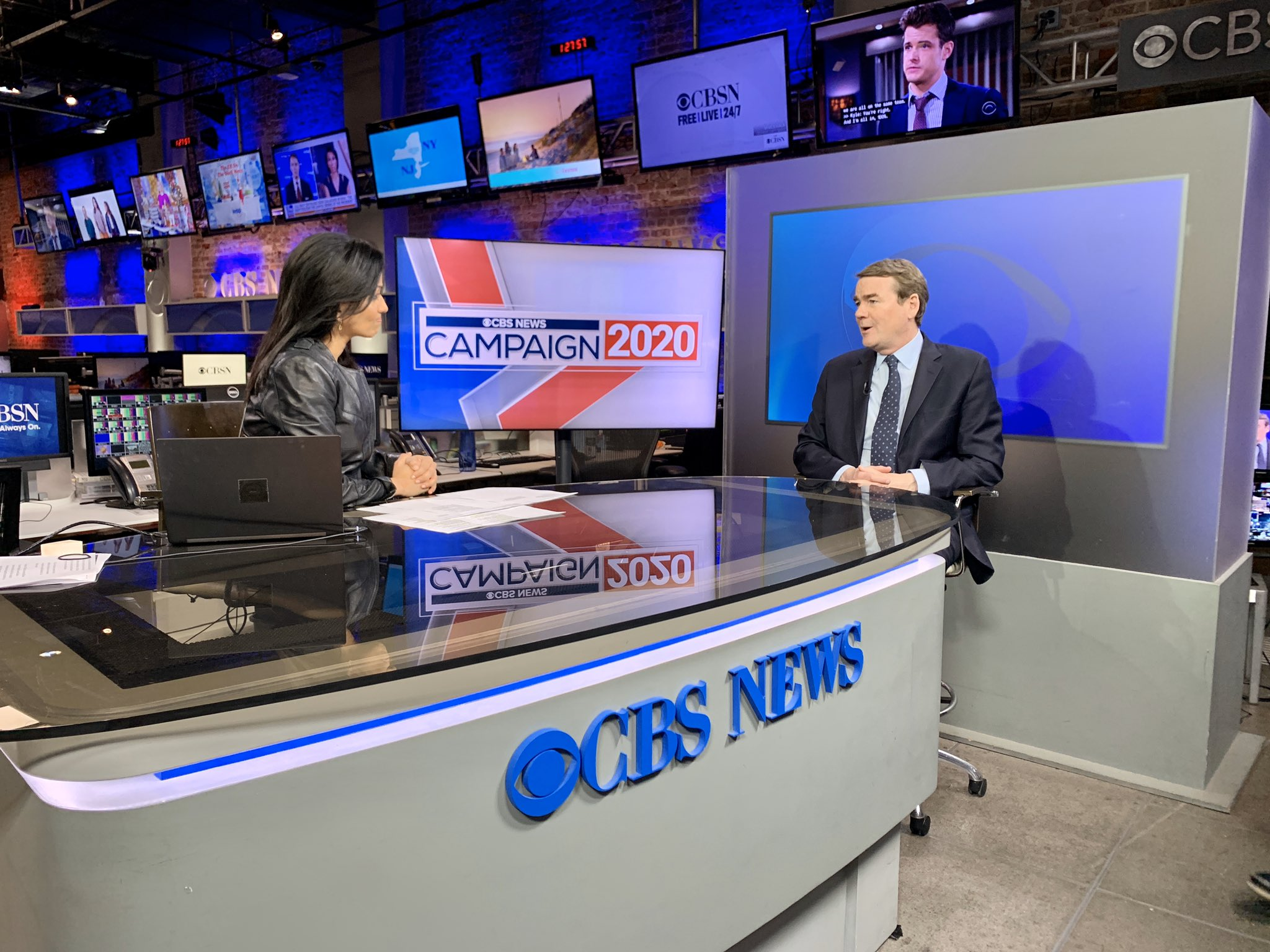
Ninan interviewing Michael Bennet in 2019

Reena Ninan (born April 18, 1979) is an Indian American television journalist and news anchor who has worked for Fox News, ABC News, and CBS News. She is also the founder of the news media company, Good Trouble Productions.

== Education ==
Ninan was valedictorian at C. Leon King High School in Tampa, Florida in 1997 in her class of 576 graduates.

She earned a bachelor's degree in political communication with a minor in women's studies from The George Washington University, School of Media and Public Affairs in 2001.

== Career ==
=== News presenter (1999–present) ===
From 1999 to 2005, Ninan was a producer at the Washington Post, a freelance journalist for ABC News, and a freelance journalist at BET.

From 2005 to 2012, she was the Middle East correspondent at Fox News.

Palestine Hotel attack incident

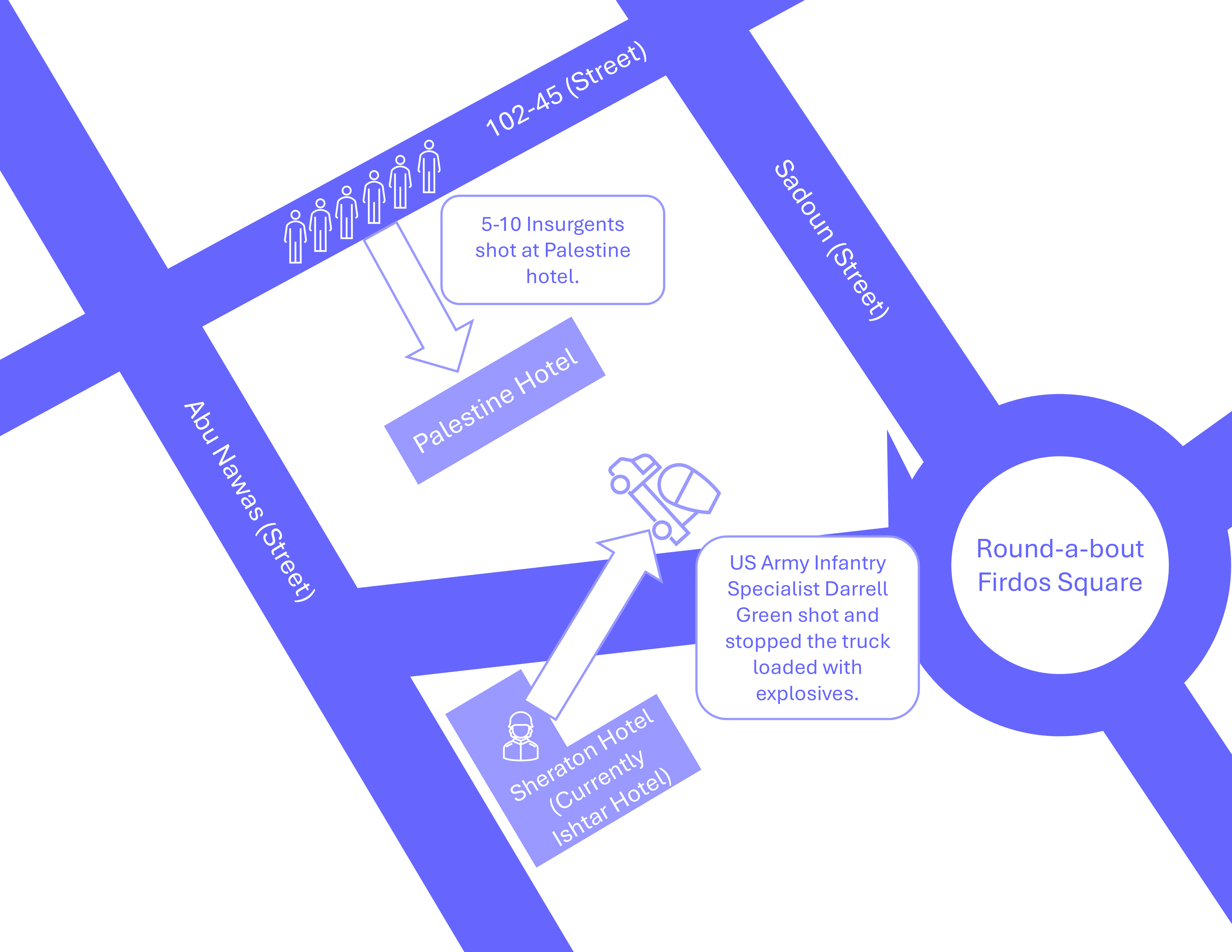
Palestine Hotel bombing diagram created on Microsoft PowerPoint. 3 suicide car bombers were killed in the attack.

On Monday, October 24, 2005 at 5:25pm local time, a coordinated attack from 5 to 10 insurgents was launched against Palestine Hotel. 3 suicide bombers were killed. Palestine Hotel is a luxury hotel in Baghdad. A car bomb initially blew a hole in the hotel's perimeter safety barricade made of concrete. A truck packed with heavy explosives then drove in through the breached barricade. Spc. Darrell Green, of the Army Infantry, stopped the truck by shooting the driver. The truck exploded with similar force as the Oklahoma City Bombing. Seconds later, a private security firm stopped the third car bomb. On the opposite side of Hotel Palestine, insurgents shot rockets, rocket propelled grenades and machine guns at the building. 16 Iraqi citizens, including security guards, hotel staff, and passersby, were killed in the attack. After the attack, Iraqi Security Forces and Coalition Forces secured the area. They worked until the barricade was up. Extra security measures were put in place after this attack. Journalist Reena Ninan was staying at the hotel and went live at the hotel on Fox News three minutes after the blast. The wall was missing from her hotel room as a result of the blasts. Ninan went unharmed. This was Ninan's first day on the job covering the Middle East.

From 2005-2012, Ninan covered many Middle Eastern countries and important events, including the Trial of Saddam Hussein (2005-2006), the Execution of Saddam Hussein (December 30th 2006) and the Withdrawal of US troops from Iraq (2007-2011).

From 2012 to 2015, Ninan worked at ABC News. She began working there in the Washington bureau, where she covered the White House and the State Department. She later moved to New York City, reporting for Good Morning America and continuing to travel abroad as a foreign correspondent. In April 2015, Ninan was named co-anchor of ABC's early morning shows World News Now and America This Morning, alongside T. J. Holmes.

From 2015 to 2020, Ninan worked at CBS News. She was the solo anchor of CBSN and the Saturday night anchor of the CBS Weekend News. She also reported for CBS Evening News, CBS This Morning, and other CBS broadcasts.

Since 2021, Ninan has been a foreign affairs and political contributor at CNN.

=== Good Trouble Productions (2020–present) ===
Since 2020, Ninan has been the founder founder and owner of her own news media company, Good Trouble Productions.

Since 2020, She has managed, taught, and mentored digital media content creation groups with 30-70 people to create a collaborative environment.

Since 2020, Ninan has been an active volunteer and moderator for Children's Hope India. The organization currently has 20 projects helping 300,000+ children across India and the United States with schooling and health.

From 2020-2026, Ninan hosted the Ask Lisa Podcast along with psychologist Dr. Lisa Damour to help with parenting tips. 800 people came to Darien High School Auditorium to see Ninan and Damour speak in May 2023. AdLarge signed an advertisement partnership deal with the podcast. Cathy Csukas, co-CEO and co-founder of AdLarge said, "Their professional and direct advice has drawn an extremely engaged and responsive audience that we're excited to share with our advertisers."

Since December 2020, Darien TV79 has been the first station to air episodes of Ninan's show The Rebound, stories of how people made it out of their darkest moments to find the light.

She delivered a message to George Washington University graduates in 2020 via Facebook.

Since 2021, Ninan has hosted a podcast called HERO: The Hidden Economics of Remarkable Women. It is partially funded by Foreign Policy and the Gates Foundation.

From 2021-2022, Ninan appeared in two C-SPAN Video Library videos to host topics of discussion, including foreign policy with Rep. Bill Keating.

In October 2023, Ninan hosted a conversation at Mather Homestead in Darien, Connecticut with Mattie Kahn about her book of the contribution teenage girls have made to society.

Ninan hosted the 2024 Sheroes in Media Awards by the Multicultural Media & Correspondents Association (MMCA) on March 27, 2024.

In May 2024, Ninan was the moderator of Toigo Foundation's Industry Insights forum. The nonprofit organization selects 50 minority group master of business administration students to benefit from their program.

On August 26, 2024, Ninan and Dr. Lisa Damour spoke for Aura's Digital Parenting Summit on parenting advice in front of a live audience at the Times Center in New York City. The forum was streamed live online.

Ninan moderated an event in December 2025 with Eli Sharabi, an Israeli citizen who endured 491 days in Hamas captivity. The event was sold out with 1,400 ticket sales.

On May 16, 2026, Ninan was the keynote speaker delivering the commencement address for Columbian College of Arts and Sciences of George Washington University for the undergraduates celebration of graduation.

Ninan is a former member of the Atlantic Council, the Rockefeller Foundation, and the Council on Foreign Relations. She currently works as a presider of their public forums.

On September 20th 2026, Ninan posted a picture on Facebook saying "Power People World, Journalist Founder, Storyteller, Different Perspectives. A more connected world."

On September 21st 2026, Ninan hosted two conversations at Her Power at the General debate of the eighty-first session of the United Nations General Assembly.

== Awards ==
Ninan has been nominated for three national Emmy Awards. In 2013, she was nominated as a reporter at the 35th Annual News & Documentary Emmy Awards for Outstanding Coverage of a Breaking News Story in a Regularly Scheduled Newscast on Good Morning America, World News with Diane Sawyer, and Nightline, for "Direct Hit: Oklahoma Tornadoes". In 2014 and 2015, Ninan was nominated twice in a row as a correspondent at the 42nd and 43rd Annual Daytime Emmy Awards for Outstanding Morning Program on ABC's Good Morning America.

== Personal life ==
Reena Ninan was born and raised in Tampa, Florida to Indian Malayali Christian parents Miriamma and Mathew. She has one brother, named Tony.

She is fluent in English, while also speaking some Arabic, Hebrew and Malayalam.

Ninan is married to author and former Newsweek reporter Kevin Peraino. They have two children, Kate and Jackson.

== See also ==
- Women in journalism
