= Julia S. Falk =

American linguist (born 1941)

Julia S. Falk (born 1941) is a professor emeritus at the Linguistics Department, Michigan State University. She earned her PhD in linguistics from the University of Washington in 1968 with a dissertation entitled "Nominalizations in Spanish." She was apparently the first woman to receive her PhD in this department.

== Career ==
Julia S. Falk is most known for her work on the history of linguistics, and in particular the history of linguistics in the United States from 1900 to 1950. She has written articles on the early history of the Linguistic Society of America, as well as a number of short intellectual biographies of particular linguists, in journal articles and for various reference works, including the American National Biography and the Encyclopedia of Linguistics. Her work has played an important role in drawing attention to the role of women linguists in the first half of the twentieth century through her book, Women, Language and Linguistics, as well as in Falk (1994, 1995).

A member of North American Association for the History of the Language Sciences (NAAHoLS), she served as president in the year 2000.

== Selected publications ==
Linguistics and Language: A Survey of Basic Concepts and Implications

History of linguistics

- Falk, Julia S. 1992. Otto Jespersen, Leonard Bloomfield, and American structural linguistics. Language 68:3.465–91.
- Falk, Julia S. 1995. Roman Jakobson and the history of Saussurean concepts in North American linguistics. Historiographia Linguistica 22:3.335–67.
- Falk, Julia S. 1995. Words without grammar: Linguists and the international auxiliary language movement in the United States. Language & Communication 15:3.241–59.
- Falk, Julia S. 1998. Defining linguistics: E.H. Sturtevant and the early years of the Linguistic Society of America. 16th International Congress of Linguists, ed. by Bernard Caron, paper no. 0029, CD-ROM. Oxford: Pergamon/Elsevier Science.
- Falk, Julia S. 1998. The American shift from historical to non-historical linguistics. Language & Communication 18:171–80.
- Falk, Julia S. 1999. 'Language as a living, cultural phenomenon' – Gladys Amanda Reichard and the study of native American languages. In History of Linguistics 1996, ed. by David Cram et al., pp. 111–18. Amsterdam & Philadelphia: John Benjamins.
- Falk, Julia S. 2003. Turn to the history of linguistics: Noam Chomsky and Charles Hockett in the 1960s. Historiographia Linguistica 30:1/2.129–85.
- Falk, Julia S. 2004. Saussure and American linguistics. In The Cambridge Companion to Saussure, ed. by Carol Sanders, pp. 107–23. Cambridge: Cambridge University Press.
- Falk, Julia S. 2004. Otto Jespersen. In The Encyclopedia of Linguistics, ed. by Philip Strazny, pp. 562–65.

Women linguists

- Falk, Julia S. 1994. The women Foundation Members of the Linguistic Society of America. Language 70:3.455–90 (1994).
- Falk, Julia S. 1995. ‘Portraits of women linguists: Louise Pound, Edith Claflin, Adelaide Hahn’. In Kurt R. Jankowsky (ed.), History of linguistics 1993 (pp. 313–20). Amsterdam / Philadelphia: John Benjamins.
- Falk, Julia S. 1997. Territoriality, relationships, and reputation: The case of Gladys A. Reichard. Southwest Journal of Linguistics 16:1/2.17–37.
- Falk, Julia S. 1999. Women, Language and Linguistics: Three American Stories from the First Half of the Twentieth Century [Alice Vanderbilt Morris, Gladys Amanda Reichard, E. Adelaide Hahn]. London and New York: Routledge, 1999.
