= Michael Erard =

American writer and journalist

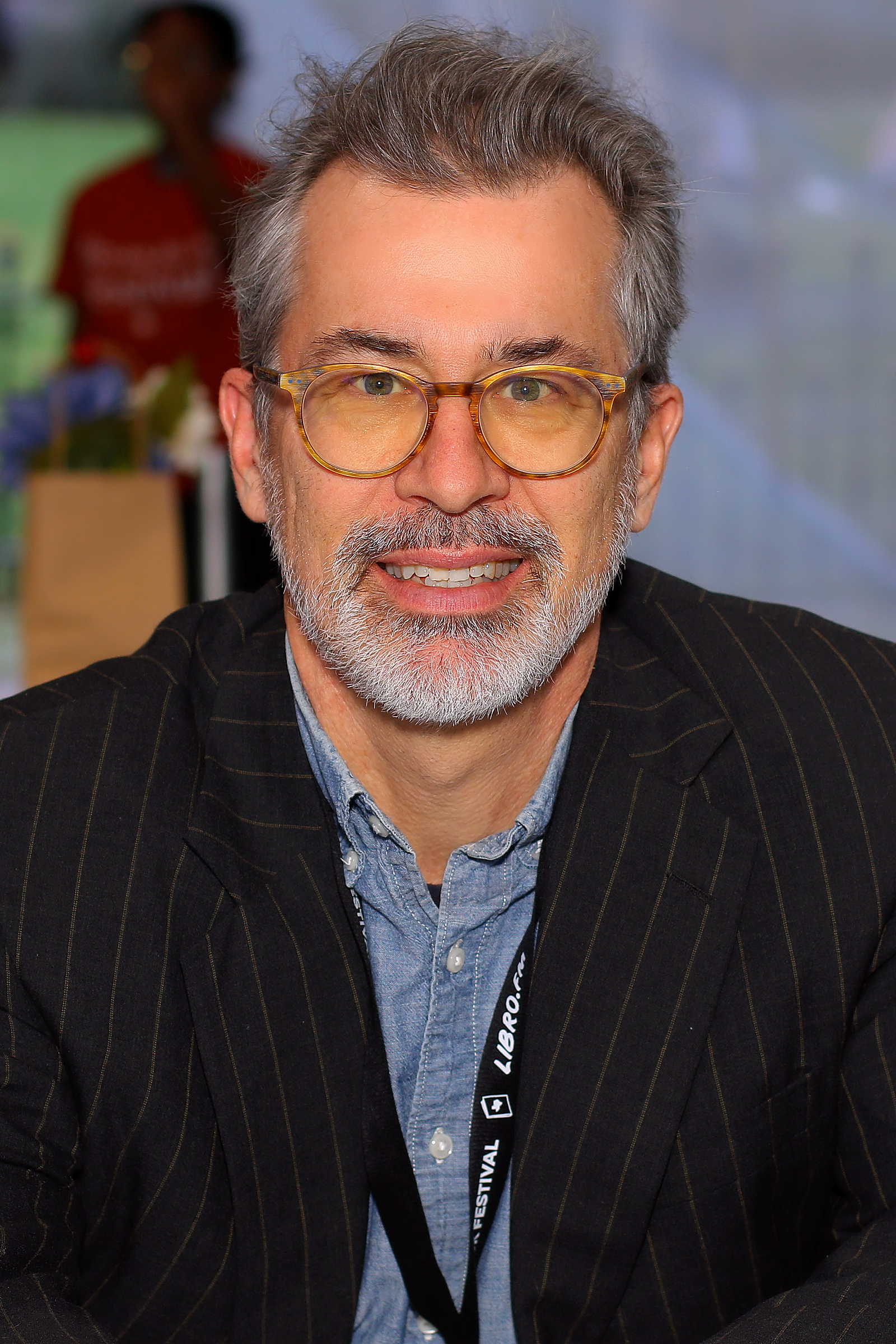
- Erard at the 2025 Texas Book Festival
- Born: 27 December 1967 (age 58)
- Education: University of Texas at Austin
- Occupations: Non-fiction writer and journalist
- Writing career
- Notable awards: Linguistics, Language, and the Public Award 2016 (from the Linguistic Society of America)
- Website: michaelerard.com

Michael Erard (born 27 December 1967) is an American non-fiction writer and journalist. He holds an M.A. (linguistics) and a Ph.D. (English) from the University of Texas at Austin.

== Notable works ==
=== Books ===
- Erard, Michael (2007). Um…: Slips, Stumbles, and Verbal Blunders, and What They Mean. New York: Pantheon.
- Erard, Michael (2012). Babel No More: The Search for the World's Most Extraordinary Language Learners. (Note: Published in the United Kingdom as Mezzofanti's Gift.) New York: Free Press.
- Erard, Michael (2025). Bye Bye I Love You: The Story of Our First and Last Words. Cambridge, Massachusetts: MIT Press.

=== Articles ===
- Erard, Michael (2005). 'The Gift of the Gab'. New Scientist, 8 January, pp. 40–43.‍
- Erard, Michael (2012). 'King of the Hyperpolyglots'. The Morning News, 10 January.
- Erard, Michael (2012). 'The Polyglot of Bologna'. The Public Domain Review, 26 June.
- Erard, Michael (2016). 'Why Australia is Home to One of the Largest Language Families in the World'. Science, 21 September.
- Erard, Michael (2019). 'Pete Buttigieg’s Language Magic Is Textbook Polyglot Mythmaking'. The Atlantic, 29 April.
