= Kevin Peraino =

American journalist (born 1976)

- Born: June 7, 1976 (age 50); Hayward, California, U.S.
- Occupations: Author and journalist
- Spouse: Reena Ninan
- Children: 2

Kevin Peraino (born June 7, 1976) is an American author and journalist.

== Career ==
Peraino's second book, A Force So Swift: Mao, Truman, and the Birth of Modern China, 1949, was released in September 2017. The New York Times Book Review called it "absorbing" and "timely" and selected it as one of its "Editors' Choice" staff picks. The Wall Street Journal featured it on the cover of its weekend book review. Peraino's first book, Lincoln in the World: The Making of a Statesman and the Dawn of American Power, about Lincoln's foreign policy, was released in October 2013. The Daily Beast named it one of the best books on President Lincoln, and Foreign Affairs magazine called it "an important step toward a richer and more useful understanding of the American past." From 1999 to 2010, Peraino was a writer for Newsweek magazine, where he reported from around the world and was a finalist for the Livingston Award for his foreign-affairs writing. He has also written for Foreign Policy, The Wall Street Journal, Politico Magazine, and other publications, and has appeared on Morning Joe, PBS NewsHour, and elsewhere. He is represented by Amanda Urban at ICM Partners.

== Personal life ==
Peraino grew up in Ridgefield, Connecticut, and graduated from Northwestern University. He is married to Reena Ninan, a television journalist at CBS News. They have two children.

== Affiliations ==
Peraino is a term member at the Council on Foreign Relations and a visiting scholar in the international relations department at New York University.

== Books ==
- A Force So Swift: Mao, Truman, and the Birth of Modern China, 1949. New York: Crown. 2017. ISBN 978-0307887238.
- Lincoln in the World: The Making of a Statesman and the Dawn of American Power. New York: Crown. 2013. ISBN 978-0307887207.
