= Alicia Beckford Wassink =

Jamaican-American linguist

Academic background
- Education: Houghton College (BA); University of Michigan PhD)
- Thesis: A Sociophonetic Analysis of Jamaican Vowels (1999)
- Doctoral advisor: Pam Beddor and Lesley Milroy

Academic work
- Discipline: Linguistics
- Sub-discipline: Sociolinguistics, acoustic phonetics, language ideology, Social network (linguistics), language contact (specifically creolistics, dialect contact and Koineization), language change
- Institutions: University of Washington
- Website: UW Faculty Page

Alicia Beckford Wassink is a Jamaican-American linguistics professor at the University of Washington. As of 2026, she serves as the president of the Linguistic Society of America. Her primary area of study is sociolinguistics, and she has historically focussed on linguistic practices in Jamaica. Later in her career, she began working to a greater degree on technological bias in automated speech recognition systems, linguistic practices among Yakama people (largely in English rather than Ichishkíin Sínwit (Sahaptin)), and Pacific Northwest English.

== Career ==
Wassink runs the Sociolinguistics Lab at the University of Washington, which specializes in Pacific Northwest English variation, bias in Automated Speech Recognition, language ideology, and other topics in social impacts of and on language.

In 2024, it was announced that Wassink was to be the vice-president (and therefore president-elect) for the Linguistic Society of America in 2025. Her stated goals for her tenure as vice president and president are to improve mentorship for graduate students toward the diverse career paths they might seek, work toward decolonizing linguistics and sociopolitical equity in the field, and increasing the staffing numbers within the Society.

Since 2014, she has served on the editorial board of the journal Phonetica.

=== SOAM ===
Early in her career at the University of Washington, Wassink developed a method of calculating vowel-intrinsic spectral change, the spectral overlap assessment metric (SOAM). Spectral change is the fluctuation of acoustic measurement values (spectra) through the articulation of a single vowel (vowel-intrinsic).

Her rationale to develop such a method was from a language change perspective, with an emphasis on studying phonological mergers. Because it appeared that the phonetic duration of a vowel played a role in such change, Wassink included duration as a dimension of analysis in order to measure how much overlap articulation of vowels in two potentially merging lexical classes have with each other. Rather than using the traditional methods of mapping the first and second formants on a 2-dimensional graph, based on just the "target" of the vowel's articulation, Wassink suggests adding the third dimension of time, in order to capture the fact that there were many points along the way, moving toward the target, hitting the target, and moving away, toward the next articulated segment. In order to best map this, Jeremy Waltmunson joined Wassink to develop VOIS3D (Vowel Overlap Indication Software, in 3 Dimensions, pronounced /vɔɪst/), which is a graphing software intended to compare the articulations of vowels. This allows the study of vowel trajectories in additional to their plain acoustic values, and—most crucially for her work—the amount of overlap between vowels' articulations. Given two tokens, VOIS3D calculates the extent to which there is spectral overlap. Nycz & Hall-Lew compare other major methods for measuring phonological mergers (Euclidean distance, mixed effects modelling, and the Pillai-Bartlett trace) with SOAM, and concludes that SOAM provides the benefit of directly showing spectral overlap across a linguistic corpus, specifically where—within the formant space—and with the a third dimension available for comparison such as duration or third formant. They also point out flaws, namely that "allophonic and lexical effects can only be dealt with by subsetting the data, and no direct measure of statistical significance is provided", and that "no measure of distance is given".

=== Linguistics outreach and communication ===
Wassink has made various appearances in media, with multiple segments on radio stations such as KUOW-FM, KPLU-FM, and KBCS-FM; as well as on television programs such as King5 Television News and the Charles Osgood Show. Her appearances have generally centered around her work on Pacific Northwest Englishes, specifically often discussing the varieties of English in the Seattle metropolitan area.

In 2019, Wassink worked with Microsoft's Aether Fairness Group as a consultant on fairness in Artificial Intelligence systems.
