= William G. Moulton =

American linguist of Germanic languages (1914–2000)

William Gamwell Moulton
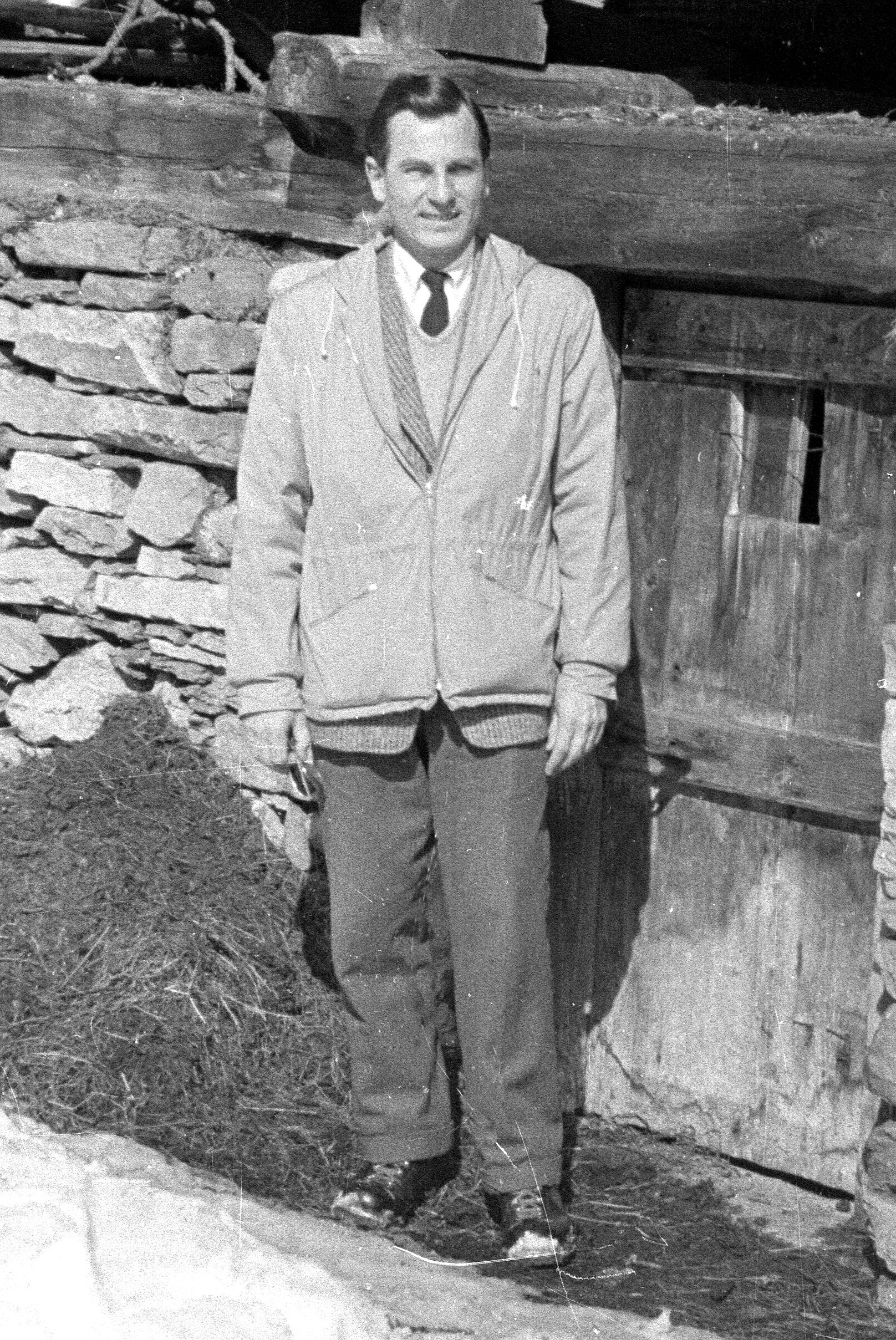
- Born: February 5, 1914; Providence, Rhode Island
- Died: June 2, 2000 (aged 86); Exeter, New Hampshire
- Education: Princeton University
- Occupation: Linguist

William G. Moulton was an American linguist and professor emeritus of linguistics and Germanic languages and literatures of Princeton University.

== Career and education ==
Moulton went to Princeton for his undergraduate education and pursued a joint degree in French and German. He was given a bachelor's degree as a Phi Beta Kappa in 1935. He was given a scholarship after graduating from Princeton and went to the University of Berlin to study languages for a year. In 1936, Moulton went to Yale University for graduate study.

In 1940, Leonard Bloomfield visited Yale and supervised Moulton on his dissertation project, Swiss German dialect and Romance patois, and was published the following year in Language.

In 1967, Moulton became the Linguistic Society of America president after serving as its vice president and as a member of its executive committee.

Moulton was given honorary degrees from Middlebury College and the University of Berlin during his career.
