= Hermann Collitz =

Linguist and Indo-Europeanist

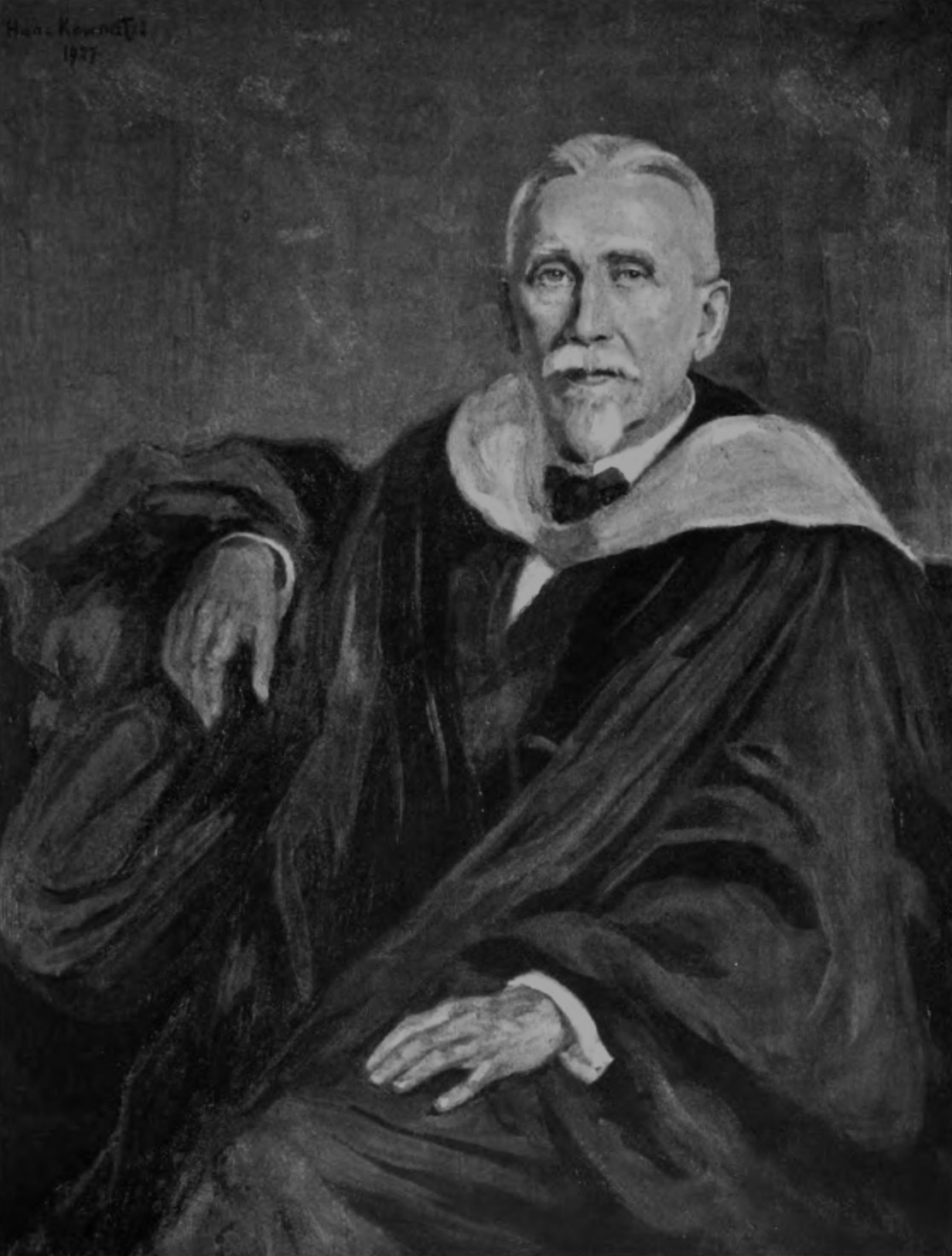
- Portrait of Collitz presented to the Johns Hopkins University
- Born: February 4, 1855; Bleckede, Kingdom of Hanover
- Died: May 13, 1935 (aged 80); Baltimore, Maryland, U.S.
- Spouse: Klara H. Collitz

Academic background
- Education: Göttingen University
- Thesis: The emergence of the Indo-Iranian palatal series (1878)

Hermann Collitz (February 4, 1855 – May 13, 1935) was a German and American historical linguist and Indo-Europeanist. He emigrated from Germany to the United States in 1886, taking a position at the newly founded Bryn Mawr College, where he stayed for 20 years. In 1907 he left for the Johns Hopkins University, where he taught until his retirement in 1927. His career interests covered the historical phonology and morphology of Indo-European languages. An advocate for American linguistics to his European colleagues, Collitz was among the 27 signers of the call to form the Linguistic Society of America, and was elected its first president. That same year he was elected president of the Modern Language Association, serving in both roles simultaneously.

== Early life and education ==
Collitz was born February 4, 1855, in the Hanoverian hamlet of Bleckede, in modern-day Lower Saxony. Growing up, he showed a notable interest in language. At home, he was exposed to both Low German—a dialect spoken locally in Hanover and neighboring regions—and High German—then a prestige variety which formed the basis for modern Standard High German. From the age of 7 to 14, he attended a recently opened one-room schoolhouse which taught writing, Latin, and French. During Collitz's time at the school, the curriculum expanded to include English, and at 13 Collitz joined a select class on Greek. At 14, he left to attended the lyceum of the Johanneum Lüneburg whose humanities section focused on Latin, Greek, and Mathematics. He graduated from the Johanneum Lüneburg in 1875.

Following his graduation from the Johanneum Lüneburg, Collitz attended the University of Göttingen where he studied classical philology with particular attention to Iranian, Slavic, and Germanic. His background in Latin and Greek was deepened by the lectures of Hermann Sauppe on Latin Grammar and the epigraphy of Latin and Greek. His understanding of the Indo-European language family was broadened by Adalbert Bezzenberger's courses on Avestan and Lithuanian, as well as an introduction to Sanskrit through Theodor Benfey's course on the hymns of the Rig Veda. In 1876 he joined the Grammatical Society (Grammatische Gesellschaft) of the newly appointed professor of Comparative Philology, August Fick, who inspired Collitz's lifelong interest in comparative linguistics. Through the Grammatical Society and under the supervision of Fick, Collitz received practice in independent research and supplemental instruction in comparative Indo-European philology. In 1878 Collitz spent the summer semester at the University of Berlin focusing on Sanskrit, Slavic philology, and German philology with fellow student and future colleague Maurice Bloomfield. That fall, Collitz returned to Göttingen to complete his doctoral research on the palatal consonants in Proto-Indo-Iranian.

== Career ==
In 1879 Collitz returned to Berlin. During his tenure he served as editor for a compendium of Greek dialect inscriptions and a dictionary of the Waldeck dialect of Low German. This period coincided with the rise of the Neogrammarian hypothesis, a major influence on modern linguistics. In his review of Brugman and Osthoff's Morphological Investigations (German: Morphologische Untersuchungen), he rejected their proposal that sound changes are regular, but by 1886 he had come to agree with the conclusion that sound change is regular. In 1883 he left Berlin for the University Library of Halle where he was tasked with completing the catalogues on General Linguistics, Comparative Linguistics, and Philosophy started by his predecessor Karl Verner. He habilitated at Halle and received the venia docendi in 1885 for his work on Sanskrit Philology.

In 1886, Collitz emigrated to the United States, where he taught at the newly founded Bryn Mawr College near Philadelphia. His colleagues at the time included future Bryn Mawr president Carey Thomas in English and future US President Woodrow Wilson in History. He was appointed an associate professor of German, and was promoted to Professor of German and Comparative Philology following the departure of E. Washburn Hopkins in 1895. At Bryn Mawr, he focused more closely on Germanic philology and especially his native Low German. With Karl Bauer, Collitz published the 1902 Waldeckian Dictionary with Dialect Samples (Waldeckisches Wörterbuch nebst Dialektproben) which synthesized a number of prior papers he had published on the topic. In 1904 he married Klara Hechtenberg, a fellow German-born philologist. That same year he was selected alongside Eduard Sievers to represent the field of Germanic Philology at the International Congress of Arts and Sciences held during the 1904 St. Louis World's Fair.

I think a keen observer will easily find that American science is no longer limited to using the results of German intellectual work, but has steadily increased and is increasing in scientific self-sufficiency and independence.

— Translation from German of Collitz (1912), quoted by Sehrt (1936)

Collitz left Bryn Mawr in 1907 for the Johns Hopkins University where he was appointed to the newly created chair in Germanic Philology. Johns Hopkins was founded on the Humboldtian model of higher education common in the German institutions where Collitz was educated, and its strength in other branches of linguistics led to an effort to promote German Philology at the institution, which Collitz fulfilled. In 1911 Collitz served as a delegate of the Johns Hopkins University to the centennial celebration of the University of Oslo where he met with a number of Nordic scholars. The following year he published a rebuke of European attitudes towards American linguistic scholarship in the forward to the first issue of Hesperia, his newly founded journal of American contributions to German Philology.

In 1924 Collitz and 26 colleagues signed a call for the formation of the Linguistic Society of America. The first meeting took place in New York City, where Collitz was elected the first president of the Society. The reasons for his election are not well documented, but every signatory of the call was eventually elected president, and Collitz, the eldest among them, was elected first. The vision Collitz had for the Linguistic Society was at the time archaic and in tension with the goals of other founding members such as Leonard Bloomfield. In his address to the first meeting of the Linguistic Society, Collitz focused on a conception of linguistics tied to written literature and emphasized the need for the society to advance curricula that included teaching of classical languages and literature. The imminent publication of this address in the first issue of Language led Bloomfield, the author of the 1924 call, to write "Why a Linguistic Society" at the urging of George Bolling and Edgar Sturtevant who were his colleagues on the organizing committee. Bloomfield's work appeared first in the volume and served as a foil to the ideas expressed by Collitz, emphasizing instead the primacy of scientific observation over the study of literature. That same year, Collitz served as president of the Modern Language Association, and the two societies met together in Chicago at the end of 1925. Collitz presented a joint presidential address to the two societies entitled World Languages where he expressed skepticism that the recent revival of interest in international auxiliary languages would lead to a single world language given the rise and fall of all other lingua francas across time.

== Legacy ==
In 1927, he retired from the Johns Hopkins University after two decades of service. Upon his retirement, a portrait of him was presented to the university on behalf of his friends and former students during the 1927 commencement. He remained editor of the Journal of English and Germanic Philology and the American Journal of Philology until 1929. In 1930 his colleagues and students published a festschrift and presented it to him in honor of his 75th birthday. The contributions to the volume include two poems by Georgia L. Field and Carol Wight, a biography by Klara Collitz, and scholarly contributions by students and friends including Bloomfield, Bolling, and Sturtevant.

If Hermann Collitz were alive today, he would certainly not ignore the pertinence of a structural approach in modern comparative Indo-European linguistics.

— "Report of the Committee on the Collitz Professorship" (1965)

Hermann Collitz died suddenly on May 13, 1935. He was survived by his wife Klara, and upon her death in 1944 she bequeathed his papers to the Johns Hopkins University and the bulk of their estate to the Linguistic Society of America. In life Collitz had amassed one of the best private collections on comparative and Germanic linguistics, and this library was included in the bequest. The proceeds of the sale of the Collitz' residence in Baltimore were used to establish the Herman and Klara H. Collitz Professorship for Comparative Philology. In 1963 Mary Haas convened a committee of former holders to determine policy around the appointment of the Collitz Professorship, particularly regarding whether scholars using structuralist approaches to historical linguistics were eligible for the chair. The following year the committee reported that structuralist approaches, while not specifically mentioned in the bequest, should be considered within the spirit of the bequest.

== Selected works ==
- Collitz, Hermann (1879). "Die Entstehung der Indo-Iranischen Palatalreihe" [The emergence of the Indo-Iranian palatal series]. Beiträge zur Kunde der indogermanischen Sprachen [Contributions to the study of Indo-European languages]. 3: 177–234.
  Pages 177 – 201 comprise his Göttingen dissertation.
- Collitz, Hermann (1879). "Review of Brugmann-Osthoff, Morphologische Untersuchungen, vol I.". Anzeiger für Deutsches Altertum und Deutsche Literatur [Journal of German Antiquity and German Literature]. 5: 318–348.
- Collitz, Hermann (1886). "Die neueste sprachforschung und die erklärung des indogermanische ablautes" [The latest linguistic research and the explanation of Indo-European ablaut]. Beiträge zur Kunde der indogermanischen Sprachen [Contributions to the study of Indo-European languages]. 11: 203–242.
- Bauer, Karl (1902). Collitz, Hermann (ed.). Waldeckisches Wörterbuch nebst Dialektproben [Waldeckian Dictionary with Dialect Samples] (PDF). OCLC 10622008.
- Collitz, Hermann (1912). Das Schwache Präteritum und seine Vorgeschichte [The weak preterite and its history]. Hesperia. Schriften zur Germanischen Philologie. Göttingen, Vandenhoeck, and Ruprecht.
- Collitz, Hermann (1925). "The Scope and Aims of Linguistic Science". Language. 1 (1): 14–16. JSTOR 409547.
  Publication of an address to the Linguistic Society of America given December 28, 1924
- Collitz, Hermann (1926). "World Languages (Presidential Address, Joint meeting of Modern Language Association and Linguistic Society of America". Language. 2 (1): 1–13. doi:10.2307/408782. JSTOR 408782.
  Also published in the Proceedings of the Modern Language Association 41
