= Eugene N. Lane =

American classical philologist (1936–2007)

Eugene Numa Lane (August 13, 1936 in Washington, DC – January 1, 2007, Columbia, MO) was an American classical philologist and archaeologist.

== Life ==
The son of linguist George Sherman Lane, he attended Episcopal High School in Alexandria, Virginia and studied from 1954 to 1958 at Princeton University (Salutatorian), then at Yale (MA, 1960; PhD, 1962). Winning a Fulbright Scholarship, he spent a year studying at the American School of Classical Studies in Athens, Greece before taking a faculty position at the University of Virginia from 1962 to 1966. He then went on to teach at the University of Missouri from 1966 to 2000. In the course of his career at the University of Missouri, he was chairman of the Classics Department and served as the Director of Graduate Studies. He taught courses in ancient and modern Greek, along with Latin and others covering classical civilizations. In 1992 he taught once again at the American School of Classical Studies where he was the director of the institution's first summer session. In 2000 he became professor emeritus at the University of Missouri.

He died of complications of Parkinson's disease on New Year's Day 2007.

== Published works ==
Eugene Lane's main interest was the study of the ancient religions, especially the influence of eastern cults in the Roman Empire. He major works were on the cults of the Men and Sabazios, both deities with Anatolian origins.

- Corpus Monumentorum Religionis Dei Menis (= Etudes préliminaires aux religions orientales dans l'Empire romain vol. 19). Vol. I-IV, Brill, Leiden 1985–1989.
- Corpuscultus Iovis Sabazii (= Etudes préliminaires aux religions orientales dans l'Empire romain, vol. 100). Bd. II-III, Brill, Leiden 1985–1989, ISBN 90-04-06951-8; ISBN 90-04-07149-0; ISBN 90-04-08974-8.
- Paganism and Christianity. A source book. Fortress Press, Minneapolis 1992, ISBN 0-8006-2647-8.
- Cybele, Attis, and Related Cults: Essays in Memory of M.J.Vermaseren (Leiden, Brill, 1996). [Served as general editor and contributed one article on the subject of the Galli.]
