= College of Literature, Science, and the Arts =

Liberal arts and sciences school in Michigan

University of Michigan College of Literature, Science, and the Arts
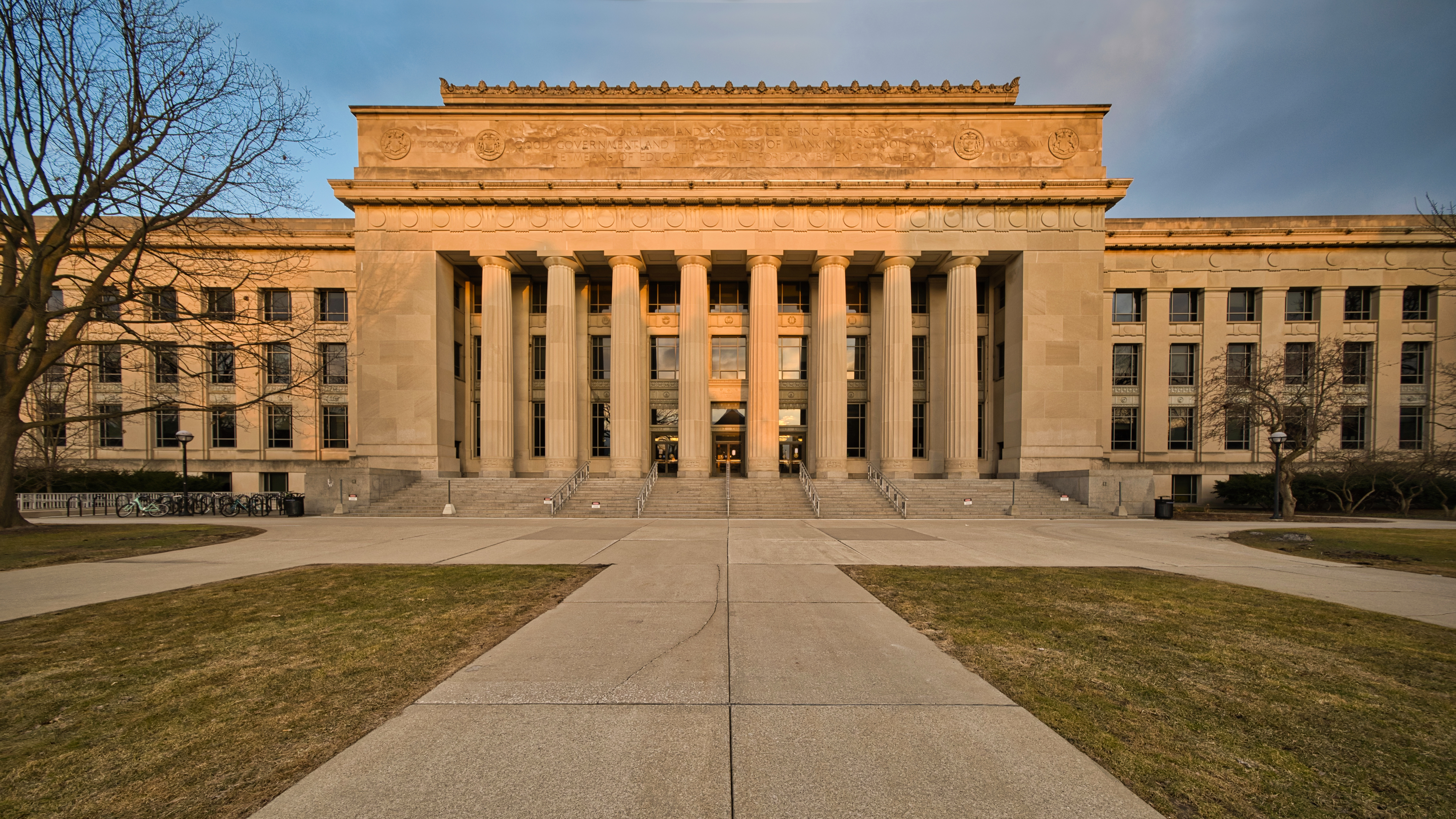
- Angell Hall, one of the major buildings housing the LSA
- Other name: LSA
- Motto: Leading in Thought and Action
- Type: Public
- Established: 1841; 185 years ago
- Parent institution: University of Michigan
- Dean: Rosario Ceballo
- Location: Ann Arbor, Michigan, United States; 42°16′34.4″N 83°44′28.8″W
- Campus: 40 acres (16 ha)
- Website: lsa.umich.edu
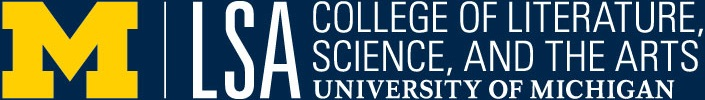

The University of Michigan College of Literature, Science, and the Arts (LSA) is the liberal arts and sciences school of the University of Michigan. The college was established in 1841.

== History ==
The College of Literature, Science, and the Arts was originally designated the Literary Department and was the core of the University of Michigan. From 1841 to 1874, the faculty elected a president that communicated with the regents about department needs. In 1875, Henry Simmons Frieze became the first of the deans of LSA.

== Departments ==
The College of Literature, Science, and the Arts consists of three divisions: the Humanities Division, the Natural Sciences Division, and the Social Sciences Division.

=== Humanities Division ===
The Humanities Division consists of the following academic departments and units:

- Department of Asian Languages and Cultures
- Department of American Culture
- Department of Afroamerican and African Studies
- Frankel Center for Judaic Studies
- Department of Classical Studies
- Department of Comparative Literature
- Department of English Language and Literatures
- Department of Film, Television, and Media
- Department of Germanic Languages and Literatures
- Department of History
- Department of the History of Art
- Institute for the Humanities
- Kelsey Museum of Archaeology
- Department of Middle East Studies
- Department of Philosophy
- Residential College
- Department of Romance Languages and Literatures
- Department of Slavic Languages and Literatures

=== Natural Sciences Division ===
The Natural Sciences Division consists of the following academic departments and units:

- Applied Physics Program
- Department of Astronomy
- Biological Station
- Department of Chemistry
- Center for the Study of Complex Systems
- Department of Earth and Environmental Sciences
- Department of Ecology and Evolutionary Biology
- Department of Mathematics
- Department of Molecular, Cellular and Developmental Biology
- Museum of Paleontology
- Department of Physics
- Department of Biophysics
- Department of Program in the Environment
- Department of Statistics

=== Social Sciences Division ===
The Social Sciences Division consists of the following academic departments and units:

- Department of Anthropology
- Department of Communication and Media
- Department of Economics
- Department of History
- International Institute
- Department of Linguistics
- Museum of Anthropological Archaeology
- Department of Organizational Studies
- Department of Political Science
- Department of Psychology
- Department of Sociology
- Weinberg Institute for Cognitive Science
- Department of Women’s and Gender Studies

== Deans ==
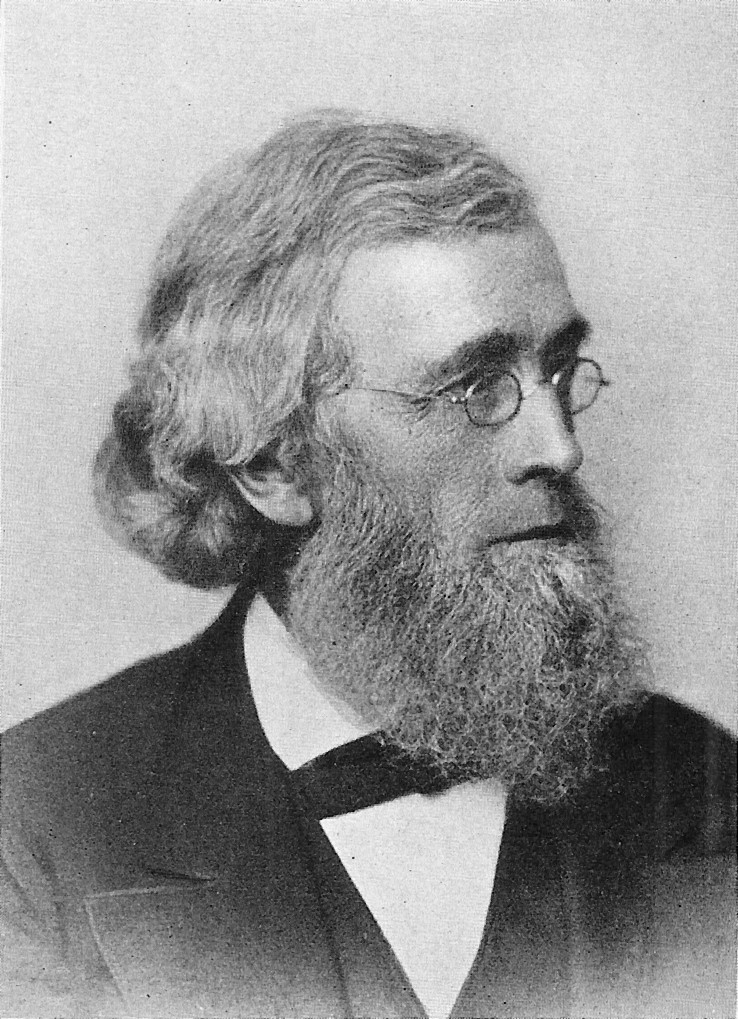
Henry Simmons Frieze, first of the deans of the University of Michigan College of Literature, Science, and the Arts

Name	Service year	Length (Approx.)	Field of study
Faculty of Literature, Science, and the Arts
Henry Simmons Frieze	1875–1880	5 years	Classical Studies
Charles Kendall Adams	1880–1881	1 year	History
Edward Olney	1881–1882	1 year	Mathematics
Henry Simmons Frieze	1882–1889	7 years	Classical Studies
Department of Literature, Science, and the Arts
Martin Luther D'Ooge	1890–1897	7 years	Classical Studies
Richard Hudson	1897–1907	10 years	History
John Oren Reed	1907–1914	1 year	Physics
John Robert Effinger (acting)	1912–1915	3 years	French
College of Literature, Science, and the Arts
John Robert Effinger	1915–1933	8 years	French
Edward Henry Kraus	1933–1945	12 years	Mineralogy
Hayward Keniston	1945–1951	6 year	Romance Languages
Burton Doan Thuma (acting)	1951–1952	1 year	Psychology
Charles Edwin Odegaard	1952–1958	6 years	History
Roger William Heyns	1959–1960	1 year	Education
Burton Doan Thuma (acting)	1962–1963	1 year	Psychology
William Haber	1963–1968	5 years	Economics
William Lee Hays	1968–1970	2 years	Psychology
Alfred S. Sussman (acting)	1970–1971	1 year	Botany
Frank H. T. Rhodes	1971–1974	3 years	Geological Sciences/Mineralogy
Billy E. Frye (acting)	1974–1976	2 years	Zoology
Billy E. Frye	1976–1980	4 years	Zoology
John R. Knott (acting)	1980–1981	1 year	English
Peter O. Steiner	1981–1989	8 years	Economics/Law
Edie Goldenberg	1989–1998	9 years	Political Science
Patricia Gurin (acting)	1998–1999	1 year	Psychology/Women's Studies
Shirley Neuman	1999–2002	3 years	English/Women's Studies
Terrence J. McDonald (acting)	2002–2003	1 year	History
Terrence J. McDonald	2003–2013	10 years	History
Susan A. Gelman (interim)	2013–2014	1 year	Psychology
Andrew D. Martin	2014–2018	4 years	Political Science
Elizabeth Cole (interim)	2018–2019	1 year	Social Sciences
Anne Curzan	2019–2024	5 years	Linguistics
Rosario Ceballo	2024–present	incumbent	Psychology

== Helen Zell Writers' Program ==
The Helen Zell Writers' Program is a two-year, fully funded Master of Fine Arts program in creative writing within the University of Michigan's English Department. Students in the program concentrate in either fiction or poetry. In 2013, Helen Zell gave $50 million to support the graduate writing program, which was renamed for her.

Alumni and former students include Jesmyn Ward, Celeste Ng, Brit Bennett, Danez Smith, Vievee Francis, and Chigozie Obioma.

== Residential College ==
The Residential College (RC) is a Michigan Living-Learning Program and academic unit within the Humanities Division of the College of Literature, Science, and the Arts.

Founded in 1967, the Residential College began as an experiment in residential education, designed to create a smaller liberal arts community within the resources of a large research university. The program was developed by a planning committee of faculty that included Theodore Newcomb, Carl Cohen, and Bradford Perkins. Since its founding, the RC has emphasized student-centered, interdisciplinary liberal arts education and active engagement in the learning process.

RC students take courses throughout LSA as well as specially designed RC courses, many of which are seminar courses with fewer than fifteen students. Until 2025, RC courses included written evaluations on transcripts alongside traditional grades. The program also includes dedicated academic advising, arts studios for ceramics, darkroom photography, screen-printing, and other visual arts, theater and gallery spaces, and a community garden, all housed within East Quadrangle.

RC students live together in East Quadrangle during their first and second years, creating a residential community in which classrooms, faculty offices, advising, arts spaces, and student living spaces are located within the same building. Because the RC is part of LSA, its students also complete LSA academic requirements and may pursue majors throughout the college. The RC offers four interdisciplinary majors: Arts and Ideas in the Humanities, Creative Writing and Literature, Drama, and Social Theory and Practice. These majors are housed within the Residential College but are open to all LSA students.

Students in the RC are required to complete four credits of language beyond the 16-credit LSA requirement. Most students do so during their first three semesters through the RC's Intensive Immersion Language Program. Each RC language path consists of two pass/fail eight-credit courses similar to language immersion, followed by a four-credit readings course. Intensive Japanese at the RC has no reading course, and its semi-immersion curriculum consists of two ten-credit courses. Other languages offered include Spanish, French, German, and Russian. At the end of the intensive language sequence, students receive a certificate of language proficiency on their official college transcript.

Students interested in joining the Residential College should indicate their interest in the RC on the Common Application when applying to U-M's College of Literature, Science, and the Arts. After admission to LSA, interested students continue through a separate RC admissions process coordinated by the Residential College's admissions office.
