= Klara Hechtenberg Collitz =

German-born American linguist

- Born: Klara Hechtenberg; 30 May 1863; Rheydt bei Mönchengladbach, Germany
- Died: 22 November 1944 (aged 81); Baltimore, Maryland, US
- Spouse: Hermann Collitz

Academic background
- Education: Oxford University (BA); University of Heidelberg (PhD)
- Thesis: Das fremdwort bei Grimmelshausen; ein beitrag zur fremdwörterfrage des 17. jahrhunderts (1901)

Academic work
- Discipline: Linguist
- Sub-discipline: German philology

Klara H. Collitz (30 May 1863 – 22 November 1944) was a German-American linguist.

== Education and career ==
In 1895, Collitz (née Hechtenberg) gained first class honors in the Oxford final examination (B.A.) after two years of study at Oxford University. In 1896 she was lecturer in Romance Languages at Victoria College in Belfast. From 1897 to 1899, she was in charge of the Department of German Philology at Smith College in Northampton, Massachusetts. She attended lectures at the University of Chicago during the summer of 1897 and spent 1898 at the University of Bonn.

After two years at the University of Heidelberg she took her Ph.D. (magna cum laude) in 1901, with a dissertation entitled Das fremdwort bei Grimmelshausen; ein beitrag zur fremdwörterfrage des 17. jahrhunderts. From 1901 to 1904, she returned to Oxford University as lecturer in German Philology for Women Students.

After her marriage to Hermann Collitz in 1904, she immigrated to the United States. Although she never again held an academic position, she continued to conduct research and contribute to scholarly journals in the United States and abroad. She participated in the first meeting of the Linguistic Society of America and became a member in its third year (1928). She participated actively in the annual meetings, maintaining her membership until her death in 1944.

== Personal life and legacy ==
On August 13, 1904, she married Hermann Collitz, who became the first President of the Linguistic Society of America. Upon her death, in 1944, she left most of her estate to the Linguistic Society of America to found the Hermann and Klara H. Collitz Professorship in Comparative Philology. She left her own and her husband's papers to Johns Hopkins University.

== Selected works ==
- Das Fremdwort bei Grimmelshausen (1901). University of Heidelberg dissertation.
- Fremdwörterbuch des 17 Jahrhunderts (1904). Berlin: B. Behr.
- Verbs of Motion in their Semantic Divergence (1931). Language Monograph 8.
