= Lisa Damour =

American psychologist (born 1970)

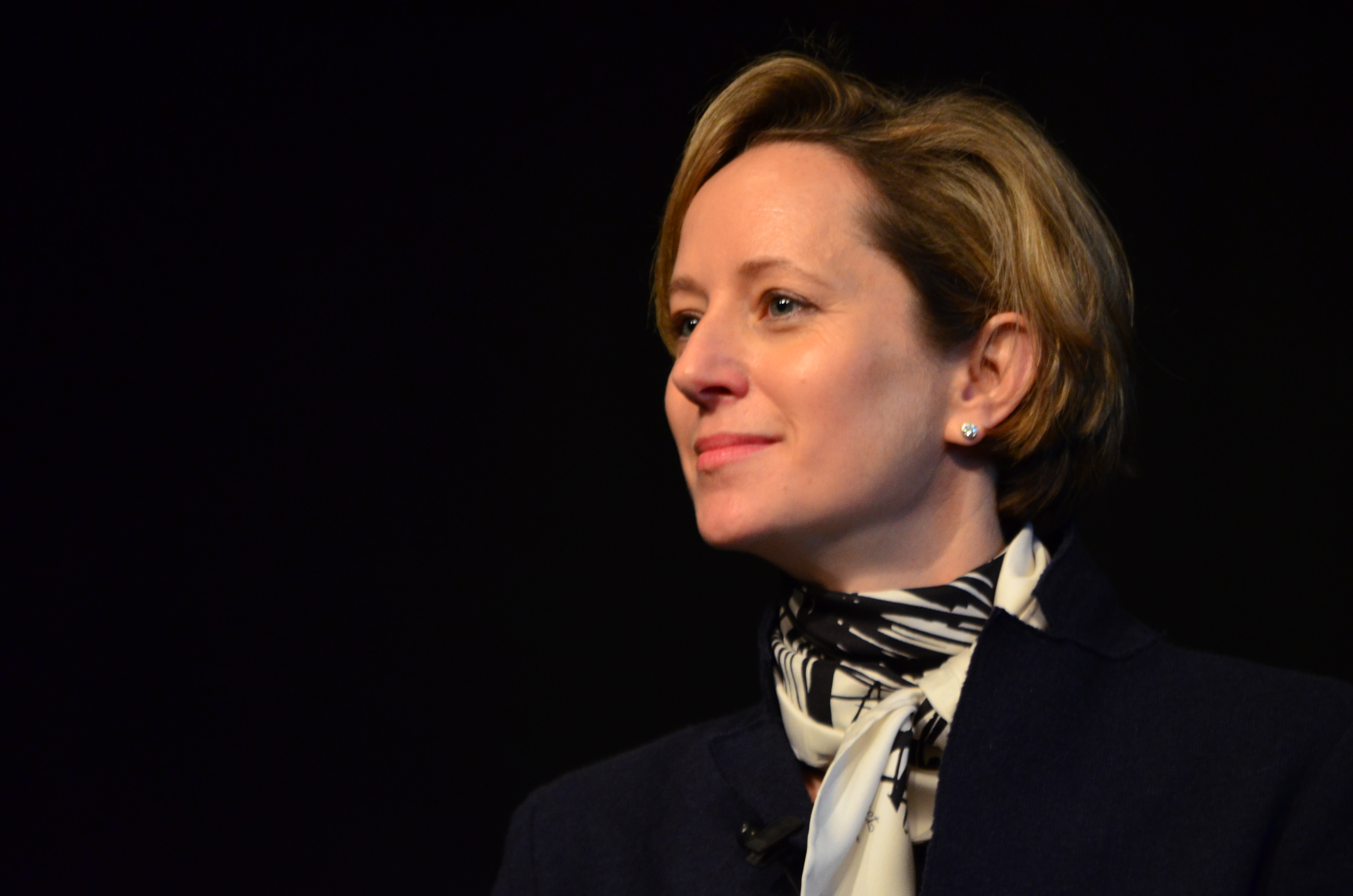
- Damour in 2017
- Born: Lisa Kendall Damour; November 7, 1970 (age 56); Denver, Colorado, United States
- Education: University of Michigan (PhD); Yale University (BA)
- Occupations: Clinical psychologist; Author
- Writing career
- Language: English
- Period: 1992–current
- Subjects: Adolescence; Parenting; Child development; Stress and anxiety
- Website: www.drlisadamour.com

Lisa Kendall Damour (born November 7, 1970) is an American clinical psychologist, author, and podcaster specializing in the development of teenagers. She is also a recurring contributor on CBS Mornings.

== Early life and education ==
Born in 1970 in Denver, Colorado, Damour was raised in Denver, London, and Chicago. She graduated from Denver's Manual High School in 1988 before attending Yale University. After graduating with honors from Yale with a BA, Damour worked for the Yale Child Study Center. She then received a doctorate in clinical psychology at the University of Michigan.

== Career ==
Damour held fellowships from Yale's Edward Zigler Center in Child Development and Social Policy, the University of Michigan's Power Foundation, and the Pediatric AIDS Foundation.

Damour maintains a private psychology practice while also serving as senior advisor to the Schubert Center for Child Studies at Case Western Reserve University. She was the founding director of Laurel School's Center for Research on Girls.

Damour has published two editions of the college textbook Abnormal Psychology with James Hansell (2005, 2008) and three editions of First Day to Final Grade with Anne Curzan (2000, 2006, 2011). Her first New York Times best seller, Untangled: Guiding Teenage Girls Through the Seven Transitions into Adulthood (Random House, 2016), describes seven developmental transitions that Damour believes turn girls into grown-ups. Damour's 2019 book, Under Pressure: Confronting the Epidemic of Stress and Anxiety in Girls (Random House), examines sources of stress and anxiety for adolescents and ways that adults can support them. Under Pressure was also a New York Times best seller. The Emotional Lives of Teenagers: Raising Connected, Capable, and Compassionate Adolescents (Random House, 2023), another New York Times best seller, helps parents understand the emotional lives of their teenagers and support them through that developmental stage.

Damour served as a consultant for the Walt Disney Pictures movie Inside Out 2. The production team consulted her for guidance on portraying how teenagers' emotions change during puberty.

She co-hosted the Ask Lisa Podcast with Reena Ninan, giving parenting tips, since the summer of 2020-2026.

Damour has given TED Talks.

Damour writes about adolescents for The New York Times and is a regular contributor to UNICEF.

Damour has appeared on CBS Mornings, CBS News 24/7 , CNN and Norah O'Donnell Reports.

== Personal life ==
Damour lives in Shaker Heights, Ohio. She has a husband and two daughters.

== Honors and awards ==
In 2016, Damour received a Books for a Better Life: Childcare and Parenting Award for Untangled by the Southern New York Chapter of the National Multiple Sclerosis Society.

In 2019, she was recognized as a Thought Leader by the American Psychological Association.

== Works ==
- First Day to Final Grade: A Graduate Student's Guide to Teaching, With Anne Curzan. 2000, 2006, 2011. ISBN 978-0472067329
- Abnormal Psychology. With James Hansell. 2005, 2008. ISBN 978-0471389828
- Untangled: Guiding Teenage Girls through the Seven Transitions into Adulthood. 2016. ISBN 978-0553393071
- Under Pressure: Confronting the Epidemic of Stress and Anxiety in Girls. 2019. ISBN 978-0399180057
- The Emotional Lives of Teenagers: Raising Connected, Capable, and Compassionate Adolescents. 2023. ISBN 978-0593500019
