= Linguistics and Language =

Book by Julia S. Falk

Linguistics and Language: A Survey of Basic Concepts and Implications
- Author: Julia S. Falk
- Language: English
- Subject: linguistics
- Genre: textbook
- Publisher: John Wiley & Sons
- Publication date: 1973, 1978 (revised)
- Media type: Print (hardcover)

Linguistics and Language: A Survey of Basic Concepts and Implications is a textbook by Julia S. Falk in which the author provides an introduction to linguistics. It is a well-known introductory text in linguistics.

== Reception ==
The book has been reviewed by Carolyn Steedman and Nicole Domingue.
