= Judith Irvine =

American anthropologist and linguist

- Born: Judith Temkin; March 10, 1945 (age 81)
- Education: University of Pennsylvania (Ph.D.)
- Occupations: Anthropologist; linguist; professor

Judith Temkin Irvine (born March 10, 1945) is the Edward Sapir Distinguished University Professor of Linguistic Anthropology at the University of Michigan, where she researches language use and social hierarchy in African social life.

Irvine earned her Ph.D. in 1973 from the University of Pennsylvania. She began teaching in 1972 in the Department of Anthropology at Brandeis University and joined the faculty at the University of Michigan in 1999. Irvine received a Guggenheim Fellowship in 2005,. She was elected to the American Academy of Arts and Sciences in 2006 and to the National Academy of Sciences in 2016.
