= George Sherman Lane =

American linguist (1902–1981)

- Lane in his 1967 Festschrift
- Born: September 28, 1902; Wayne County, Iowa, U.S.
- Died: September 18, 1981 (aged 78); Chapel Hill, North Carolina, U.S.
- Children: Eugene N. Lane

Academic background
- Education: University of Chicago
- Thesis: Words for clothing in the principal Indo-European languages (1930)

George Sherman Lane (September 28, 1902 – September 18, 1981) was an American linguist. His research focus was the Tocharian language.

== Life ==
Lane began his studies in 1922 at the University of Iowa, where he studied under Henning Larsen and received his first award, the Early English Text Society Prize. In 1926, he graduated first of his class, and in 1927 obtained a Master of Arts in English. This was followed by studies in Reykjavík, where he learned Sanskrit, as well as in Paris, where he studied under Meillet, Vendryes and Benveniste. At the University of Chicago he collaborated with Carl Darling Buck on the latter's Dictionary of selected synonyms in the principal Indo-European languages. After his dissertation, he joined the University of North Carolina in Chapel Hill, where he conducted further research on the Tocharian language, particularly the grammar of Tocharian B. In 1952, he was admitted to the American Academy of Arts and Sciences.

His son, Eugene N. Lane (1936–2007), became a professor in classical philology.

== Selected works ==
- Words for clothing in the principal Indo-European languages. Chicago, 1930.
- Vocabulary to the Tocharian Puṇyavantajātaka. Baltimore, 1948.
- Studies in Kuchean grammar. Baltimore, 1952.
