= Anne Curzan =

American scholar in English language and literature

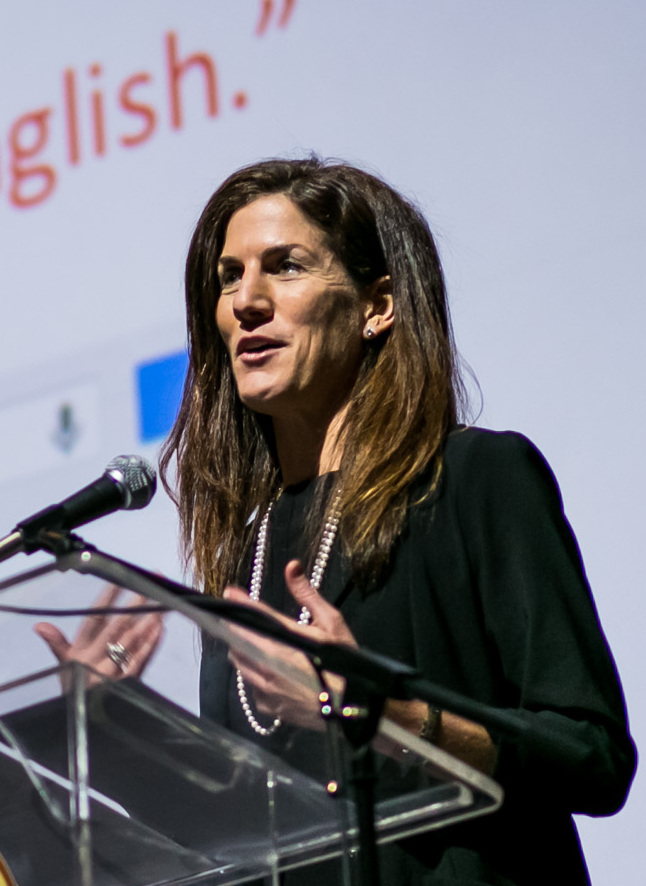
- Curzan in 2015

Academic background
- Education: Yale University (BA); University of Michigan (MA, PhD)
- Website: AnneCurzan.com; University of Michigan Faculty Profile

Anne Curzan is an American scholar in English language and literature. She is currently a professor of English at the University of Michigan.

Curzan served as the dean of the College of Literature, Science, and the Arts (LSA) at the University of Michigan from September 2019 to June 2024.

== Education ==
Curzan received a Bachelor of Arts (summa cum laude) with a major in linguistics from Yale University in 1991. She received a Master of Arts and a Doctor of Philosophy in English language and literature from the University of Michigan in 1995 and 1998, respectively.

== Career ==
Curzan joined the University of Washington as an assistant professor at the Department of English in 2001. She moved to the University of Michigan to serve as assistant professor in 2002, and was promoted to associate professor in 2004. She received full professorship at the University of Michigan in 2012.

Curzan is a member of the American Heritage Dictionary Usage Panel and the American Dialect Society, which votes on the Word of the Year. She co-hosts the weekly Michigan Public radio segment That's What They Say with Rebecca Hector and has written for the Chronicle of Higher Education's Lingua Franca blog. At the University of Michigan, Curzan received the Henry Russel Award, the Faculty Recognition Award, and the John Dewey Award.

Curzan served as the dean of the College of Literature, Science, and the Arts at the University of Michigan from September 1, 2019, to June 30, 2024. Two labor disputes occurred during her tenure. From September 8, 2020, to September 16, 2020, the Graduate Employees' Organization (GEO 3550) went on strike to protest the university's plan to reopen during the COVID-19 pandemic. In an email to university faculty members, Curzan expressed concern about the potential strike's impact on undergraduate education. On March 27, 2023, GEO 3550 went on strike after failing to reach a collective bargaining agreement with the university administration. On August 7, 2023, Curzan forwarded an email from Provost Laurie McCauley to members of the LSA community outlining the administration's response to the strike, including provisions that Graduate Student Instructors (GSIs) must file weekly reports that they were continuing to work; and that striking GSIs would be removed from their courses, replaced with substitute instructors, and not return as instructors for those courses the following term.

A book authored by Curzan, Says Who?, was published in March 2024.

== Books ==
- ISBN 978-0-205-03228-0 How English works: A linguistic introduction
- ISBN 978-0-472-06732-9 First day to final grade: A graduate student's guide to teaching, with Lisa Damour
- ISBN 978-0-521-82007-3 Gender shifts in the history of English
- ISBN 978-1-59803-893-4 The secret life of words: English words and their origins
- ISBN 978-1-107-02075-7 Fixing English: Prescriptivism and language history
- ISBN 978-0-593-44409-2 Says Who? A Kinder, Funner Usage Guide for Everyone Who Cares About Words
