= Phonetica =

- Discipline: Phonetics
- Language: English
- Edited by: Benjamin V. Tucker and Richard Wright

Publication details
- History: 1957–present
- Publisher: De Gruyter
- Frequency: Quarterly

Standard abbreviations
- ISO 4: Phonetica

Indexing
- CODEN: PHNTAW
- ISSN: 0031-8388 (print); 1423-0321 (web)
- OCLC no.: 01642569

Links
- Journal homepage

Phonetica is a peer-reviewed academic journal of phonetics that was established in 1957 by E. Zwirner. It is published by De Gruyter. Its current editors-in-chief are Benjamin V. Tucker and Richard Wright.
