= George Bolling =

American linguist (1871–1963)

- Born: April 13, 1871; Baltimore, Maryland, US
- Died: June 1, 1963 (aged 92); Princeton, New Jersey, US

Academic background
- Education: Johns Hopkins University

Academic work
- Discipline: Linguist
- Sub-discipline: Greek language
- Institutions: Ohio State University

George Melville Bolling (April 13, 1871 – June 1, 1963) was an American linguist.

Bolling was born in Baltimore, Maryland. He attended Loyola College. In 1895, he became professor of Greek, and associate professor of comparative philology and Sanskrit at Catholic University. In 1897, he received his doctorate from Johns Hopkins University.

He taught at Ohio State University as professor of Greek Languages and Literature. He was one of the signers of the call that led to the foundation of the Linguistic Society of America, and served as its president in 1931. From 1925–1931, he was the editor of the Society's academic journal, Language.He was a member of the American Philological Association, American Oriental Society, and the Archaeological Institute of America.

He was a contributor to the American Journal of Philology, the American Oriental Society Journal, the Trans-American Philological Association Bulletin, the Catholic University Bulletin, and the Catholic Encyclopedia.

== Publications ==
- Bolling, George Melville. The External Evidence for Interpolation in Homer. Oxford: Clarendon Press, 1998.
