= Hayward Keniston =

American linguist (1883–1970)

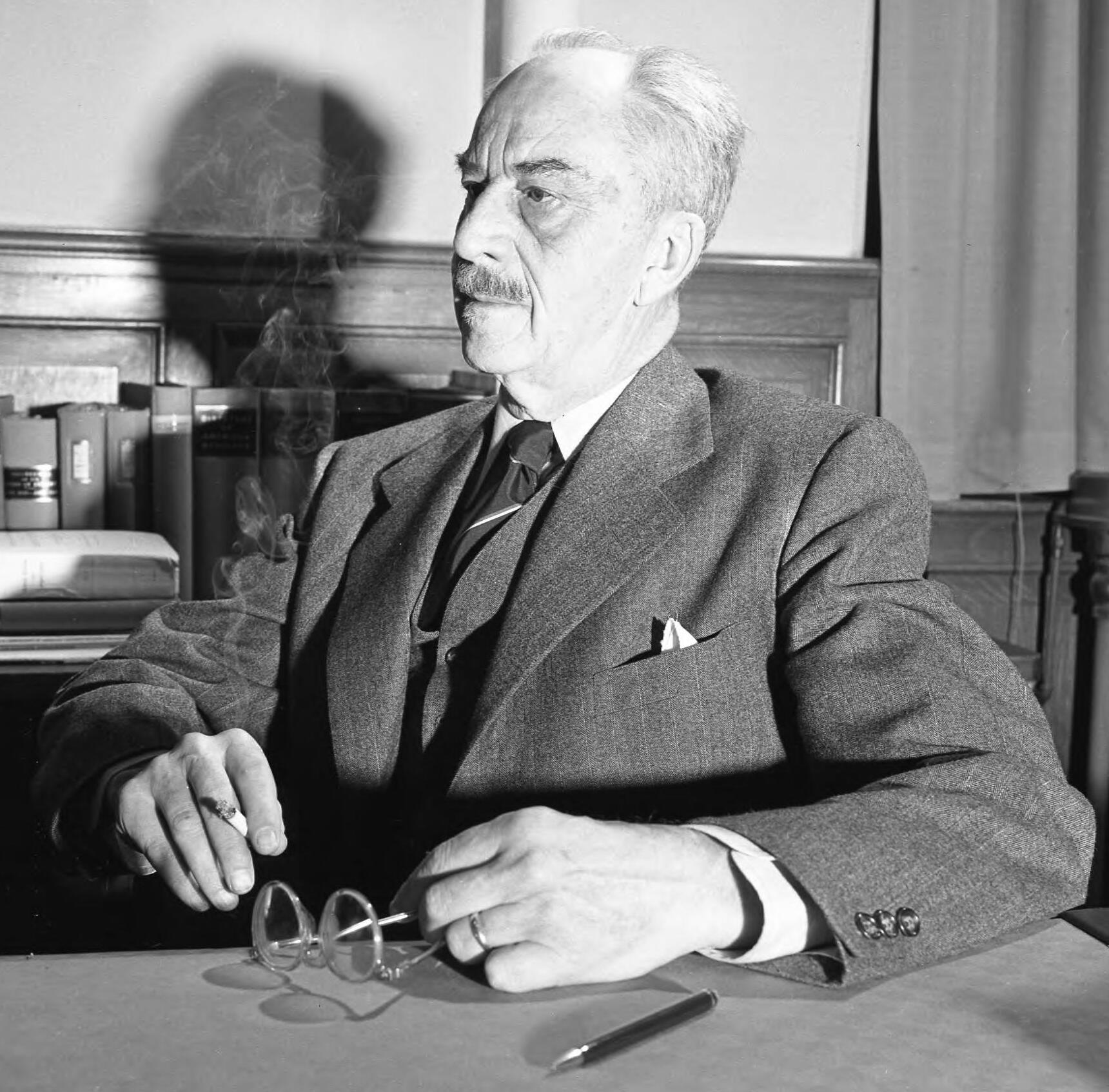
- Keniston, c. 1945
- Born: July 5, 1883; Somerville, Massachusetts, US
- Died: August 10, 1970 (aged 87); Yarmouth, Nova Scotia, Canada
- Spouse: Roberta Cannell
- Children: 4

Academic background
- Education: Harvard University (BA, MA, PhD)

Academic work
- Discipline: Linguist
- Sub-discipline: Syntax
- Institutions: University of Chicago; University of Michigan; Harvard University; Cornell University

Ralph Hayward Keniston (July 5, 1883 – August 10, 1970) was an American linguist who served as president of the Linguistic Society of America in 1948 and as dean of the University of Michigan College of Literature, Science and the Arts from 1945 to 1951. He received his PhD from Harvard University. His work focused predominantly on Spanish syntax and 16th century Spanish history.
