= Linguistic Society of America =

American learned society

- Abbreviation: LSA
- Formation: December 28, 1924; 101 years ago
- Region served: United States
- Members: 3500
- President: Heidi Harley
- Vice-President: Alicia Beckford Wassink
- Secretary-Treasurer: Frederick Newmeyer
- Publication: Language; Semantics and Pragmatics
- Website: www.lsadc.org

The Linguistic Society of America (LSA) is a learned society for the field of linguistics. Founded in New York City in 1924, the LSA works to promote the scientific study of language. The society publishes three scholarly journals: Language, the open access journal Semantics and Pragmatics, and the open access journal Phonological Data & Analysis. Its annual meetings, held every winter, foster discussion amongst its members through the presentation of peer-reviewed research, as well as conducting official business of the society. Since 1928, the LSA has offered training to linguists through courses held at its biennial Linguistic Institutes held in the summer. The LSA and its 3,600 members work to raise awareness of linguistic issues with the public and contribute to policy debates on issues including bilingual education and the preservation of endangered languages.

== History ==
The Linguistic Society of America (LSA) was founded on 28 December 1924, when about 75 linguists met to select officers, ratify a constitution, and present papers in order to facilitate communication within the field of linguistics. The foundational members included 31 women, most of whom worked as educators rather than as scholars at research institutions. By 1935, half of the female foundational members had left the society—a rate similar to that of male members—largely due to the professionalization of the field of linguistics that disproportionately affected women as most worked outside of academia.

Before the foundation of the LSA, a number of other similar societies existed, including the American Philological Society and the Modern Language Association, and with the publication of Sapir's Language and Saussure's Course in General Linguistics in 1921 and 1922, the field of linguistics began to take shape as an independent discipline. Though an international discipline, the founders of the LSA had a growing feeling of an American linguistics different from the traditional European topics and methodologies popular at the time. One of the founding members, Leonard Bloomfield, explained the need for and establishment of the society so that the science of language, similar to but separate from other sciences, could build a "professional consciousness.

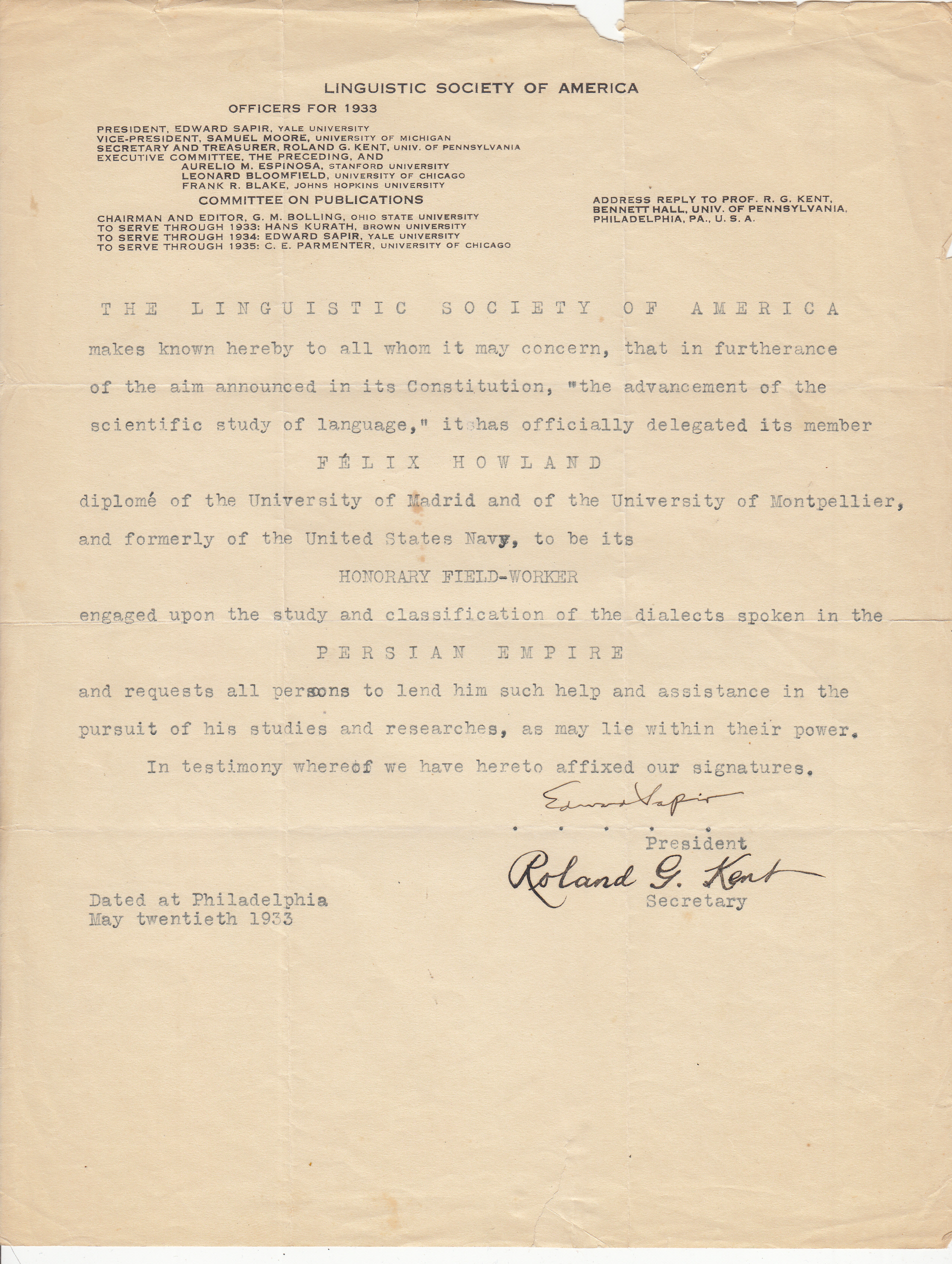
LSA letterhead listing officers in 1933, stating mission, and delegating a member to be an Honorary Field-Worker

From the start the LSA focused on establishing the science of linguistics, separate from other fields such as philology and anthropology. The founders were characterized as "scientific revolutionaries" as the early scholarship of the society's members contributed to the development of descriptive linguistics through their rejection of previous linguistic scholarship and methods in favor of new ones. Though when the views of the female members of the society are taken into account, the society was less revolutionary and more diverse in their scholarship.

The LSA published the first edition of its flagship journal, Language, in March 1925. That same year the society elected its first president, Hermann Collitz. In 1927, three years after the organization's founding, the LSA was admitted into the American Council of Learned Societies. The following year, one of the founding members of the LSA, Edgar Sturtevant, organized the first of the Linguistic Institutes which the LSA still holds biennially.

As the LSA grew, it began to take on a larger role outside of the professional sphere. During World War II, the LSA helped the United States government with language training programs through its Linguistic Institutes. After the longtime Secretary-Treasurer Archibald Hill retired from his position in 1969, the LSA made large changes to its organizational structure to better accommodate its new and growing role. The responsibilities of the secretary-treasurer were expanded and the LSA established a secretariat in Washington, D.C., in order to act as a liaison between the members, federal government, and other professional organizations. In 1981, the LSA and nine other professional organizations founded the Consortium of Social Science Associations in order to advocate for the governmental support of social science research.

== Organizational structure ==
The Linguistic Society of America (LSA) is governed by three officers and an executive committee. The three officers—president, vice-president, and secretary-treasurer—are elected by the members of the LSA. The president, elected to a one-year term, serves as the chair of the executive committee, as well as presiding over the annual meeting of the society. The president is first elected to the vice-presidency for a one year-term, which also carries the title of president-elect, and then assumes the presidency at the conclusion of the annual meeting. The secretary-treasurer is nominated by the executive committee and elected by the membership to a five-year term. They serve as the chief financial officer of the LSA. Heidi Harley serves as president as of 2025, with Alicia Beckford Wassink as vice president. The current secretary-treasurer, having taken office in January 2018, is Frederick Newmeyer, who will serve until at least 2027.

The executive committee has ultimate authority over all policy decisions of the LSA. The committee is composed of 12 members, 11 of which have voting privileges. The executive director serves ex officio without a vote, while the three officers and the previous year's president serve as voting members of the body. The remaining seven positions are specifically elected and held by members of the LSA. One is a student member, elected to a two-year term, while the remaining six are full members elected to three year terms. The elections for the three-year terms are staggered, with two members elected each year. The executive director is nominated by the executive committee and appointed by the president. They serve as the chief administrative officer, overseeing the society's application and adherence to policies, and report directly to the executive committee.

Membership in the LSA is open to any person who pays dues and entitles the member to receive the society's flagship publication, Language, as well as submit manuscripts to LSA publications and abstracts to be considered for the annual meeting. Scholars who live outside of the United States may be elected as honorary members of the LSA after being nominated by the executive committee. There are currently about 3,500 members.

The LSA has a number of standing committees and special-interest groups on various issues in linguistics, including:

- Committee on Endangered Languages and their Preservation (CELP)
- Ethics Committee
- Committee on Ethnic Diversity in Linguistics (CEDL)
- Linguistics in the School Curriculum Committee (LiSC)
- Linguistics in Higher Education Committee (LiHeC)
- Public Relations Committee
- Committee on Public Policy (CoPP)
- Committee on Student Issues and Concerns (COSIAC)
- Committee on Gender Equity in Linguistics (COGEL), formerly on the Status of Women in Linguistics (COSWL)
- Committee on Scholarly Communication in Linguistics (COSCIL)
- Committee on LGBTQ+ Issues in Linguistics (COZIL)
- Linguistics Beyond Academia Special Interest Group

== Meetings ==
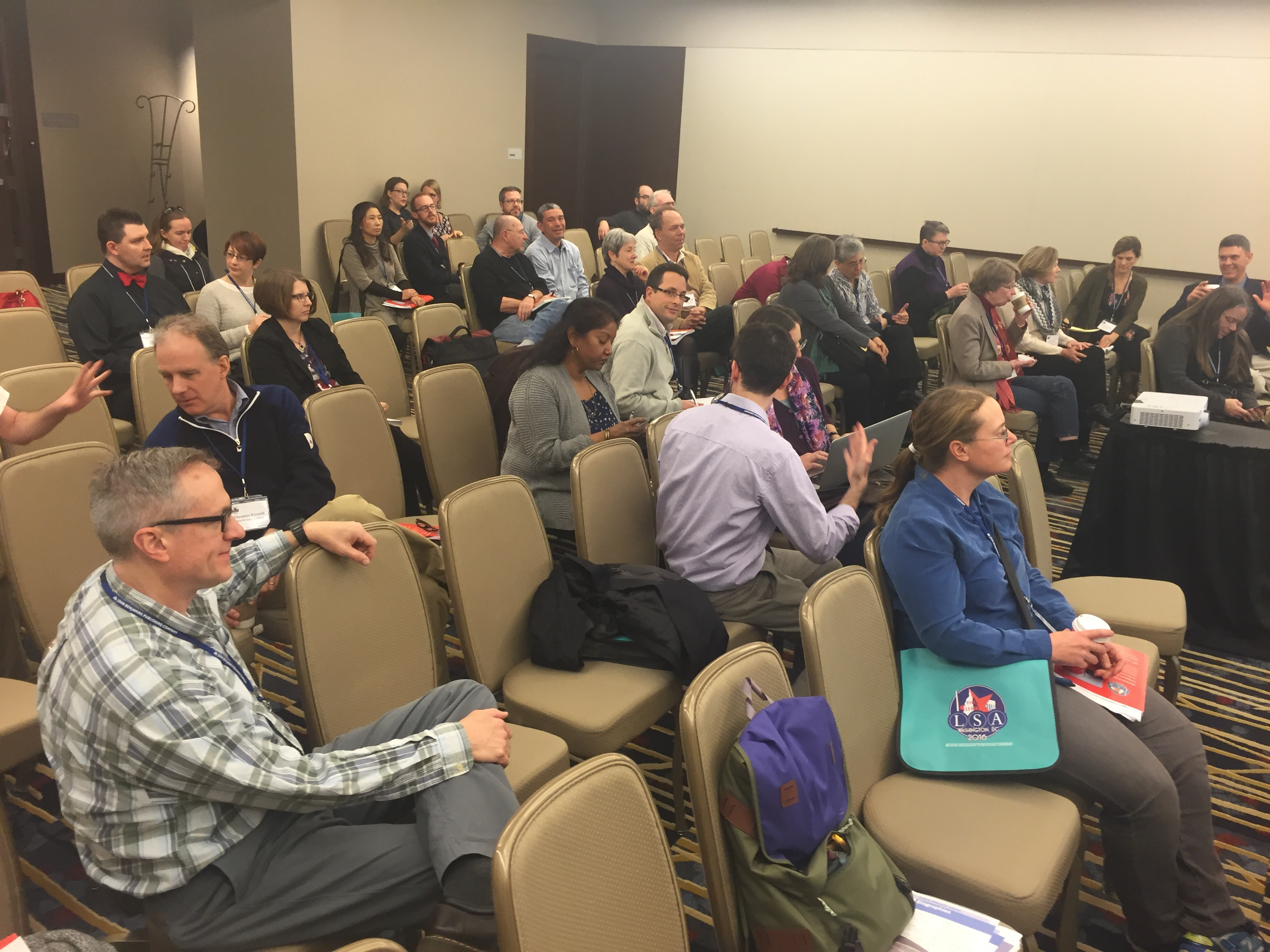
Attendees of a talk on Wikipedia editing at the 2016 Annual Meeting of the LSA

The first meeting of the Linguistic Society of America (LSA) took place on 28 December 1924, at the American Museum of Natural History in New York City. The society met biannually until 1982, meeting once in the summer in conjunction with the Linguistic Institute and once in the winter. Since 1982, the LSA has met annually in the winter. The meetings took place in December until 1990 when the meetings were moved to early January.

The four-day Annual Meeting co-meets with a number of sister organizations such as the American Dialect Society, the American Name Society, the Society for the Study of the Indigenous Languages of the Americas, the North American Association for the History of the Language Sciences, North American Research Network in Historical Sociolinguistics, Society for Computation in Linguistics, and the Society for Pidgin and Creole Languages. Members of the LSA may submit abstracts to the Program Committee for consideration for talks and poster sessions at the annual meeting. The LSA also offers "minicourses" at its annual meeting which offer instruction in various fields such as Python scripting and statistical methods using R.

=== Linguistic Institutes ===
The LSA holds a four-week biennial Linguistic Institute in the summer which includes talks and coursework on various aspects of linguistics. Considered by the membership to be one of the most important services of the LSA, the institute has helped influence the development of the field through promotion of new directions such as psycholinguistics and sociolinguistics. Each institute features a number of endowed chairs named after prominent linguists: the Sapir chair in general linguistics, the Hermann and Klara H. Collitz Chair in historical linguistics, and since 2005, the Ken Hale chair in linguistic fieldwork and the preservation of endangered languages. The newest endowed professorship is named after the late LSA President Charles Fillmore. The LSA also endows a series of student fellowships, named after prominent linguists and family members. These include fellowships named for Ken Hale, James McCawley, Ivan Sag, and Julia Bloch. The Bloch fellow also serves a simultaneous appointment to the LSA's executive committee and as the chair of its Student Committee. For the 2019 Institute, the LSA made two additional fellowship awards: the first named after Charles Fillmore, and the second named after Yuki Koroda.

The idea for a Linguistic Institute was first proposed in the spring of 1927 by Reinhold Saleski. The fledgling Society was hesitant at first, but Edgar Sturtevant was keen on the idea. Sturtevant molded Saleski's idea into a model still used today: a gathering of scholars in conjunction with coursework. The executive committee voted to authorize the first Linguistic Institute, to be held 1928, along with authorization for a second institute in 1929. After the fourth Institute in 1931, the program took a four-year hiatus due to the great depression. Institutes were held every year concurrently with summer meetings of the LSA until 1988 when, due to increasing costs, the society announced that the Linguistic Institutes would be held every other year. It was at that same time that the summer meeting of the LSA was also discontinued. (See Falk 2014 for a detailed history of the Linguistic Institutes.)

In addition to the main Linguistic Institute, the LSA also sponsors the Institute for Collaborative Language Research (CoLang), which is held in alternate years from the main institute. CoLang provides training in language documentation and reclamation with a focus on Indigenous languages. It was most recently held in 2024 at Arizona State University and the Salt River Pima-Maricopa Indian Community. The LSA also sponsors a student fellowship at this event.

== Publications ==
The LSA publishes two journals of its own, as well as publishing conference proceedings for the Annual Meeting of Phonology, the Annual Meeting of Semantics and Linguistics Theory (SALT), the Annual Meeting of the Berkeley Linguistic Society (BLS), and extended conference abstracts from its own Annual Meetings.

The flagship journal of the LSA, Language, is ranked as one of the top journals in the field. The journal is almost as old as the society itself. First published in March 1925 and edited by George Melville Bolling, Aurelio Espinosa, and Edward Sapir, the journal published its 92nd volume in 2016 under the editorship of Gregory Carlson. Carlson's successor, Andries Coetzee, was elected editor of language in 2016 and assumed office in 2017 for a term of seven years. The journal is delayed open access, allowing articles to be published open access after a year, or immediately for a fee.

Its sister publication, Semantics and Pragmatics is fully open access. It was founded in 2008 as a co-journal of the eLanguage publishing platform the LSA developed, but became a full journal in its own right in 2013 with the discontinuation of eLanguage. The goal of the new publication was to not only publish articles, but also do so with the advances in open publishing, including fast turnaround times and free and open access.

In 2018, the LSA launched a second "sister" journal to Language, titled Phonological Data and Analysis. A call for submissions was issued at that time, and the first article was published in June 2019.

The LSA publishes a series of conference proceedings, including Semantics and Linguistic Theory (SALT), The Annual Meetings in Phonology (AMP), the Berkeley Linguistic Society (through volume 45), and Proceedings of the LSA (formerly Extended Abstracts). All are fully open access publications.

== Advocacy ==
The LSA aims to advance the scientific study of language and accomplishes this goal through advocacy efforts. The society, recognizing its growing role in advocacy, established a secretariat in Washington, D.C., in 1969 to better liaise between its membership and the government. Around that same time, the LSA began working with other professional organizations to meet and exchange research as part of the Consortium of Social Science Associations (COSSA). During the Reagan administration after cuts to social science funding in 1981, the LSA and 9 other professional organizations founded COSSA as an advocacy effort for the funding of social science research.

Advocacy efforts are not only limited to science funding, but larger issues of public policy as well. Over the years, the LSA membership have passed a number of resolutions regarding issues of public policy. In 1987, the LSA officially took a stand against the English-only movement in the United States stating that "English-only measures ... are based on misconceptions about the role of a common language in establishing political unity, and ... are inconsistent with basic American traditions of linguistic tolerance." Furthering that stance, the membership ratified a statement on linguistic rights in 1996 declaring "the government and people of the United States have a special obligation to enable indigenous peoples to retain their languages and cultures" and declared 7 fundamental linguistic rights including the right "to have their children educated in a manner that affirmatively acknowledges their native language abilities..." which includes the possibility of education in a language other than English. Five years later, the LSA lent its support for the recognition of sign languages as equal to that of other languages. The resolution, passed in 2001, "affirm[ed] that sign languages used by deaf communities are full-fledged languages with all the structural characteristics and range of expression of spoken languages" and urged that sign languages be given the same respect as other languages in academic and political life.

The society has also engaged in more targeted advocacy efforts. In 1997, an LSA resolution supported the Oakland school-board in its attempt to favor teaching that is sensitive to the distinctive characteristics of African American Vernacular English, the "Ebonics" debate. More recently, the LSA has advocated for the passage of bills funding revitalization programs for Native American languages. Their efforts are not limited strictly limited to language however. Citing an interest in promoting diversity (particularly linguistic diversity), the LSA, along with other professional societies, signed an amicus curiae brief in the Supreme Court case of Fisher v. University of Texas stating the importance of affirmative action policies and urging for their retention.

== Awards ==
The LSA presents a series of awards during its annual meeting. The list of awards, their descriptions, and selected holders are listed below:

- Best Paper in Language: awarded to the best paper published in the journal Language that year; all published papers written by at least one LSA author are eligible.
- Early Career Award: awarded to a member who has made "outstanding contributions to the field of linguistics" early in their career.
- Excellence in Community Linguistics Award: awarded to members of language communities (typically outside the academic sphere of professional linguists) who make "outstanding contributions" for the benefit of their community's language.
- Kenneth L. Hale Award: named after linguist Kenneth Hale, this award is given to a member who has done "outstanding work" on the documentation of a particular language or family of languages that is endangered or no longer spoken.
- Leonard Bloomfield Book Award: named after linguist Leonard Bloomfield, this award is given to a book that has made an "outstanding contribution of enduring value" to our understanding of language and linguistics.
- Linguistics Service Award: awarded to a member who has performed "distinguished service" for the society
- Linguistics, Language and the Public Award: awarded to a member for work that "effectively increases public awareness and understanding of linguistics and language" in the four years immediately preceding the nomination deadline; works in any medium are eligible and can be considered for multiple cycles.
- Student Abstract Award: awarded to a student who has submitted an abstract to the annual meeting.
- Victoria A. Fromkin Lifetime Service Award: named after linguist Victoria Fromkin, this award is given to a member who has performed "extraordinary service to the discipline and to the Society" throughout their career
- Linguistics Journalism Award: First awarded in 2014, this award is given to "the journalist whose work best represents linguistics" in the prior year.

=== Linguistics, Language, and the Public Award recipients ===
Past winners of the Linguistics, Language, and the Public Award include:

- Anne Curzan
- Michael Erard
- Leanne Hinton
- Anne H. Charity Hudley
- Language Log
- Gretchen McCulloch
- John McWhorter
- Donna Jo Napoli
- North American Computational Linguistics Open Competition
- Geoffrey Nunberg
- Steven Pinker
- John R. Rickford
- Deborah Tannen
- Walt Wolfram

== See also ==
- List of fellows of the Linguistic Society of America
- List of presidents of the Linguistic Society of America
- SIL International
