= Language (journal) =

- Discipline: Linguistics
- Language: English
- Edited by: Andries Coetzee

Publication details
- History: 1925–present
- Publisher: Linguistic Society of America via Johns Hopkins University Press (United States)
- Frequency: Quarterly
- Open access: Delayed, 1-year
- Impact factor: 1.5 (2024)

Standard abbreviations
- ISO 4: Language

Indexing
- ISSN: 0097-8507 (print); 1535-0665 (web)
- LCCN: 27011255
- JSTOR: 00978507
- OCLC no.: 50709582

Links
- Journal homepage; Online archive (Project MUSE)

Language is a peer-reviewed quarterly academic journal published by the Linguistic Society of America since 1925. It covers all aspects of linguistics, focusing on the area of theoretical linguistics. Its current editor-in-chief is Andries Coetzee (University of Michigan).

Under the editorship of Yale linguist Bernard Bloch, Language was the vehicle for publication of many of the important articles of American structural linguistics during the second quarter of the 20th century, and was the journal in which many of the most important subsequent developments in linguistics played themselves out.

One of the most famous articles to appear in Language was the young Noam Chomsky's scathing 1959 review of the book Verbal Behavior by the behaviorist cognitive psychologist B. F. Skinner. This article argued that behaviorist psychology, then a dominant paradigm in linguistics (as in psychology at large), had no hope of explaining complex phenomena like language. It was followed two years later by another book review that is almost as famous—Robert B. Lees's glowingly positive assessment of Chomsky's own 1957 book Syntactic Structures, which put Chomsky and his generative grammar on the intellectual map as the successor to American structuralism.

By far the most cited article in Language is the 1974 description on the turn-taking system of ordinary conversation by the founders of conversation analysis—Harvey Sacks, Emanuel Schegloff, and Gail Jefferson. This article describes the socially normative system of rules that accounts for the complex turn-taking behaviour of participants in conversation, demonstrating the system in detail using recordings of actual conversation.

Language continues to be an influential journal in the field of linguistics: it is ranked twenty-fourth out of 184 in the "linguistics" category in the 2018 Journal Citation Reports, with an impact factor of 1.899.
