= List of linguists =

A linguist in the academic sense is a person who studies natural language (an academic discipline known as linguistics). Ambiguously, the word is sometimes also used to refer to a polyglot (one who knows several languages), a translator/interpreter (especially in the military), or a grammarian (a scholar of grammar), but these uses of the word are distinct (and one does not have to be multilingual in order to be an academic linguist). The following is a list of notable academic linguists.

In the list, the description is presented as:

surname, given name (country, year of birth–year of death), main achievement

== A ==
- Abbott, Barbara (United States, 1943–), pragmatics, semantics
- Abel, Carl (Germany, 1837–1906), comparative lexicography
- Abdul Haq, Maulvi (India, 1870–1961), Urdu language
- Abrams, Lise (United States), psycholinguistics
- Abramson, Arthur S. (United States, 1925–2017), phonetics
- Adamou, Evangelia (France), language contact
- Adams, Douglas Q. (United States), English language, comparative linguistics, Tocharian language
- Adler, George J. (Germany/United States, 1821–1868), lexicography, German language, English language
- Aijmer, Karin (Sweden, 1939–), pragmatics, semantics
- Aikhenvald, Alexandra Yurievna (Russia, 1957–), syntax, typology, Amazonian languages, Papuan languages, Hebrew language, Russian language
- Aitken, Adam Jack (UK, 1921–1998), lexicography
- Ajduković, Jovan (Serbia, 1968–), Slavic languages, sociolinguistics, contact linguistics, Russian language, Serbian language
- Albright, William Foxwell (United States, 1891–1971), Semitic languages
- Alexiadou, Artemis (1969–), Greek language, syntax
- Al-Khalil ibn Ahmad al-Farahidi (Oman, 718–786 CE), Arabic prosody
- Al-Kisa'i (Iraq, d. 804), Arabic grammar
- Allan, Keith (Australia, 1943–), semantics
- Allen, Shanley (1964–), psycholinguistics, Inuktitut
- Alleyne, Mervyn Coleridge (Trinidad and Tobago/Jamaica, 1933–2016), creole language
- Ameka, Felix (Ghana, Australia, Netherlands, 1957–), pragmatics, semantics
- Amerias (Greece, 3rd century BC), Ancient Macedonian language, lexicography
- Anagnostopoulou, Elena (1967–), Greek language, theoretical linguistics
- Anderson, Gregory D.S. (United States), Munda languages
- Anderson, Stephen (United States, 1943–), morphology and history of linguistics
- Aoun, Joseph (Lebanon/United States, 1953–), Arabic language, syntax
- Aquilina, Joseph (Malta, 1911–1997), Maltese language
- Ariel, Mira (Israel), Accessibility Theory, pragmatics
- Arisaka Hideyo (Japan, 1908–1952), Japanese language
- Aristar, Anthony (South Africa/United States, 1948–), linguistic infrastructure
- Armstrong, Lilias (UK, 1882–1937), phonetics
- Aronoff, Mark (Canada, 1949–), morphology
- Ascoli, Graziadio Isaia (Italy, 1829–1907), substrata, Ladin language
- Austin, John Langshaw (UK, 1911–1960), philosophy of language, speech act
- Awobuluyi, Oladele (Nigeria, 1937–), African languages
- Ayres-Bennett, Wendy (UK), history of French and history of linguistic thought
- Azad, Humayun (Bangladesh, 1947–2004), Bengali language
- Al-Harbi, Abdul Aziz (Saudi Arabia, 1965–)
- Al-Mubarrad (Basra, c. 826–c. 898)

== B ==
- Babiniotis, Georgios (Greece, 1939–), Greek language
- Babych, Nadiya (Ukraine, 1943–2021), phraseology
- Bach, Emmon (United States, 1929–2014), syntax, phonology, Haisla language
- Baker, Mark (United States, 1959–), Mohawk language, generative grammar
- Bally, Charles (Switzerland, 1865–1947), French language, phraseology
- Barbara, Leila (Brazil, 1938–2024), systemic functional linguistics
- Bardovi-Harlig, Kathleen (United States, 1954–), second-language acquisition, tense and aspect, pragmatics
- Bar-Hillel, Yehoshua (Israel, 1915–1975), machine translation, categorial grammar
- Barker, (Philip) Muhammad Abd-al-Rahman (United States, 1930–2012), Urdu language, Indian languages
- Barlow, Robert Hayward (United States, 1918–1951), Nahuatl language
- Barnhart, David K. (United States, 1941–), lexicography, English language
- Barnhart, Robert (United States, 1933–2007), lexicography, English language
- Barsky, Robert (Canada), discourse analysis
- Barthes, Roland (France, 1915–1980)
- Bartlett, John Russell (United States, 1805–1886)
- Basbøll, Hans (Denmark, 1943–), phonology, Danish
- Baudouin de Courtenay, Jan Niecisław (Poland, 1845–1929), phonology, Polish language
- Bauer, Robert Stuart (United States, 1946–), syntax, phonology, Sino-Tibetan languages (especially Cantonese)
- Baugh, John (United States, 1949–), sociolinguistics, linguistic profiling, forensic linguistics
- Beckman, Mary E. (United States, 1953–), phonetics, phonology
- Beckwith, Christopher (United States, 1945–), Asian languages, Tibetan language
- Beddor, Patrice (United States), Phonetics, speech perception
- Bedirxan, Celadet Alî (Syria, 1893–1951) Kurdish language
- Beeken, Jeannine (Belgium, 1961–), lexicography, syntax, Dutch language
- Beekes, Robert S. P. (Netherlands, 1937–2017), historical linguistics, Indo-European linguistics, Greek linguistics
- Bello, Andrés (Venezuela, 1781–1865), Spanish language, philology
- Bellugi, Ursula (United States, 1931–2022), sign language, neurolinguistics
- Ben-Yehuda, Eliezer (Israel, 1858–1922), lexicography, Revival of the Hebrew language
- Bender, M. Lionel (United States, 1934–2008), African languages
- Benedict, Paul K. (United States, 1912–1977), Sino-Tibetan languages, Tai–Kadai languages, historical linguistics
- Benveniste, Émile (France, 1902–1976)
- Berez-Kroeker, Andrea L. (United States, 1972–), language documentation
- Berlitz, Charles Frambach (United States, 1914–2003), language acquisition
- Berlitz, Maximilian Delphinius (United States, 1852–1921), language acquisition
- Bhartrihari (India, 450–510), Sanskrit
- Bickel, Balthasar (Switzerland, 1965–), language typology, Kiranti languages
- Bickerton, Derek (United States, 1926–2018), creole languages, origin of language
- Bleek, Wilhelm Heinrich Immanuel (Germany, 1827–1875), languages of Africa
- Bloch, Bernard (United States, 1907–1965), Japanese language
- Bloch, Jules (France, 1880–1953), languages of India
- Bloomfield, Leonard (United States, 1887–1949), structural linguistics
- Blust, Robert (United States, 1940–2022), Austronesian languages
- Boas, Franz (United States, 1858–1942), indigenous languages of the Americas
- Bœck, Égide de (Belgium, Belgish Congo, 1875–1944), Bangala language, Lingala
- Boersma, Paul (Netherlands, 1959–), phonetics
- Boiagi, Mihail G. (Habsburg monarchy, 1780–uncertain), Aromanian grammar
- Bohn, Ocke-Schwen (Germany, 1953–), phonetics, second-language acquisition
- Bolinger, Dwight Le Merton (United States, 1907–1992), semantics, Spanish language
- Bomhard, Allan R. (United States, 1943–), Nostratic languages, historical linguistics
- Ester Bonet (Spain, born 1950), sports terminology
- Bopp, Franz (Germany, 1791–1867), Indo-European languages, comparative linguistics
- Boullón Agrelo, Ana Isabel (Spain, born 1962), Galician language toponymy, Galician–Portuguese philology
- Bowerman, Melissa (1942–2011), psycholinguistics, language acquisition
- Bowern, Claire, historical linguistics
- Boyd, Julian Charles (United States, 1931–2005), English language
- Bresnan, Joan (United States, 1945–), syntax
- Bright, William (United States, 1928–2006), Native American languages, South Asian languages
- Brinton, Laurel J. (Canada, 1953–), grammaticalization, discourse markers
- Brody, Michael (Hungary, 1954–), syntax
- Broselow, Ellen (United States, 1949–), second language acquisition, phonology
- Browman, Catherine (United States, 1945–2008), phonetics, phonology
- Brugmann, Karl (Germany, 1849–1919), Indo-European languages, Sanskrit, comparative linguistics
- Bucholtz, Mary (United States, 1966–), sociolinguistics
- Burgess, Anthony (UK, 1917–1993), English language, phonetics
- Burling, Robbins (United States, 1926–2021), languages of India
- Burridge, Kate (Australia), Germanic languages
- Butt, Miriam (Germany, 1966–), syntax, South Asian languages
- Butzkamm, Wolfgang (Germany, 1938–), applied linguistics, English language
- Byington, Cyrus (United States, 1793–1868), translated English religious text into Choctaw language
- Badawi, El-Said (Egypt, 1929–2014), Arabic

== C ==
- Caland, Willem (Netherlands, 1859–1932), historical linguistics, Sanskrit
- Campbell, Lyle (United States, 1942–), Native American languages, historical linguistics
- Canger, Una (Denmark, 1938–), Mesoamerican languages
- Canonge, Elliott D. (United States, 1921–1971), Comanche, Inuit
- Capell, Arthur (Australia, 1902–1986), Australian languages, Austronesian languages, Papuan languages
- Cardona, George (United States, 1936–), Indo-European studies
- Carnap, Rudolf (Germany, 1891–1970), syntax, constructed languages
- Carnie, Andrew (Canada, 1969–), syntax
- Caro Baroja, Julio (1914–1995), Basque language
- Caro, Miguel A. (Colombia, 1843–1909), Spanish language, Colombian Spanish
- Carpenter, William Henry (United States, 1853–1936), Icelandic language
- Cart, Théophile (France, 1855–1931), Esperanto
- Carter, Hazel (UK, 1928–2016), Bantu languages
- Catford, J. C. (UK, 1917–2009), phonetics
- Chadwick, John (UK, 1920–1998), Linear B
- Chafik, Mohamed (Morocco, 1926–), writer and specialist in the Berber or Amazigh languages, dialects, and literature
- Chafe, Wallace (United States, 1927–2019), cognitive linguistics, semantics
- Chao Yuen Ren (China, 1892–1982), Chinese language
- Chakrabarti, Byomkes (India, 1923–1981), Santali language, Bengali language, comparative linguistics
- Champollion, Jean-François (France, 1790–1832), Egyptian hieroglyphs
- Chambers, Jack (Canada, 1938–), sociolinguistics
- Chatterji, Suniti Kumar (India, 1890–1977), Bengali language
- Chelliah, Shobhana, Tibeto-Burman languages
- Chierchia, Gennaro (Italy, 1953–), semantics, pragmatics
- Choijinzhab (PR China, 1931–2022), Mongolian language
- Chomsky, Noam (United States, 1928–), syntax, universal grammar
- Choueiri, Lina (Lebanon), syntax, Lebanese Arabic
- Chyet, Michael L. (United States, 1957–), Kurdish language
- Clark, Eve V. (UK/United States, 1942–), psycholinguistics, language acquisition
- Clyne, Michael George (Australia, 1939–2010), Germanic languages
- Cohen, Paul S. (United States), 1942–), phonology, etymology
- Cohen, Maurice Abraham (Australia), 1851–1923), Urdu
- Collitz, Hermann (Germany/United States, 1855–1935), historical linguistics
- Comrie, Bernard (UK, 1947–), typology
- Cook, Guy (UK, 1951–), applied linguistics
- Cook, Vivian (UK, 1940–2021), applied linguistics
- Corder, Stephen Pit (UK, 1918–1990), applied linguistics
- Coşeriu, Eugen (Romania/Germany, 1921–2002), Romance languages
- Couper-Kuhlen, Elizabeth (1943–), interactional linguistics
- Cowgill, Warren (United States, 1929–1985), Indo-European studies
- Cowper, Elizabeth (Canada, 1952–), syntax
- Creissels, Denis (France, 1943–), syntax, phonology, Niger–Congo languages, Nakh-Daghestanian languages
- Croft, William (United States, 1956–), syntax, cognitive linguistics
- Crowther, Samuel Ajayi (Nigeria, 1809–1891), Yoruba language, Igbo language
- Crystal, David (UK, 1941–), English language, language death, applied linguistics
- Cuervo, Rufino José (Colombia, 1844–1911), Spanish language, Colombian Spanish
- Culicover, Peter W. (United States), syntax, language change
- Culioli, Antoine (France, 1924–2018), general linguistics
- Cumakunova, Gülzura (Kyrgyzstan, 1954–), Turkic languages
- Curme, George Oliver, Sr. (United States, 1860–1948), German language, English language
- Curzan, Anne (United States), English language, Descriptivism, Prescriptivism, lexicography
- Calvet, Louis-Jean (France, 1942-), Sociolinguistique

== D ==
- Dal, Vladimir (Russia, 1801–1872), lexicography, Russian language
- Dahl, Östen (Sweden, 1945–), tense and aspect in linguistic typology
- Darzi, Ali (Iran, 1959–), generative syntax, minimalist program
- Das, Khudiram (India, 1916–2002), Bengali and Santali language
- Dani, Ahmad Hasan (Pakistan, 1920–2009), South Asian languages
- Daniels, Peter T. (United States, 1951–), writing systems
- Davies, Shaun (Australia), Yugambeh language
- Dayal, Veneeta (United States, 1956–), semantics, syntax
- Deacon, Terrence (United States, 1950–), language change, origin of language, cognitive linguistics
- Dehkhoda, Ali-Akbar (Iran, 1879–1959), lexicography, Persian language
- De Houwer, Annick (Belgium, 1958–), early child bilingualism
- Delbrück, Berthold (Germany, 1842–1922), Indo-European languages, syntax, comparative linguistics
- DeLancey, Scott (United States, 1949–), Tibeto-Burman languages, linguistic typology, historical linguistics
- Dempwolff, Otto (Germany, 1871–1938), Austronesian languages
- Diderichsen, Paul (Denmark, 1905–1964), Danish
- Diffloth, Gérard (United States, 1939–2023), Mon–Khmer languages
- van Dijk, Teun Adrianus (Netherlands, 1943–), pragmatics, discourse analysis, text linguistics
- Dik, Simon (the Netherlands, 1940–1995) Functional Grammar, theoretical linguistics
- Dixon, Robert Malcolm Ward (Australia, 1939–), syntax, typology, Australian languages, Amazonian languages
- Dobrovský, Josef (Czech Republic, 1753–1829), Slavic languages, Czech language, lexicography
- Dobson, Veronica Perrule (Australia, 1944–), Arrernte language
- Doke, Clement Martyn (South Africa, 1893–1980), Bantu languages, Lamba language
- Dolgopolsky, Aharon (Russia/Israel, 1930–2012), Nostratic languages
- Dorian, Nancy (United States, 1936–2024), language death, Scottish Gaelic
- Dougherty, Ray C. (United States, 1940–), transformational grammar, computational linguistics
- Dowty, David (United States, 1945–), semantics, syntax
- Dozier, Edward P. (United States, 1916–1971), Native American languages, languages of the Philippines
- Dressler, Wolfgang U. (Austria, 1939–), phonology, morphology, text linguistics
- van Driem, George (Netherlands, 1957–), Tibeto-Burman languages, symbiosism, Dzongkha language
- Dryer, Matthew (United States), typology, syntax, language documentation
- Duden, Konrad (Germany, 1829–1911), lexicography, German language
- Dunn, John Asher (United States,1939–2017), Tsimshian language
- Dušková, Libuše (Czech Republic, 1930–), English language, functional linguistics

== E ==
- Eckert, Penelope (United States, 1942–), sociolinguistics, language and gender
- Edmondson, Jerold A. (United States, 1941–2023), Tai–Kadai languages, languages of Southeast Asia
- Edwards, Jonathan, Jr. (United States, 1745–1801), North American languages, historical linguistics, Mohegan language
- Ehret, Christopher (United States, 1941–2025), languages of Africa, historical linguistics
- Elbert, Samuel Hoyt (United States, 1907–1997), Polynesian languages of Hawaiʻi and Rennell and Bellona, Puluwatese language
- Elgin, Suzette Haden (United States, 1936–2015), constructed languages, transformational grammar
- Ellis, Rod (UK), second-language acquisition
- Elman, Jeffrey L. (United States, 1948–2018), language processing, neurolinguistics
- Emeneau, Murray Barnson (United States, 1904–2005), Dravidian languages, linguist areas
- Emre, Ahmet Cevat (Turkey, 1876–1961), Member of the Turkish Language Association, Turkish alphabet
- Engberg-Pedersen, Elisabeth (Denmark, 1952–), semantics, Danish Sign Language
- Epps, Patience L., Amazonian languages, language documentation
- Erdal, Marcel (Turkey, 1945–), Turkic languages
- Esenç, Tevfik (Turkey, 1904–1992), Ubykh language
- Esling, John (Canada, 1939–), phonetics
- Estrella Santos, Ana (Ecuador, born 20th-c.), dialectology
- Evans, Nicholas (Australia, 1956–), Indigenous Australian languages, Papuan languages, typology
- Evans, Vyvyan (UK, 1968–), cognitive linguistics, digital communication, and emoji
- Even-Shoshan, Avraham (Belarus/Israel, 1906–1984), Hebrew language, lexicography
- Everett, Daniel Leonard (United States, 1951–), languages of Brazil, Pirahã language
- Everson, Michael (United States/Ireland, 1963–), writing systems, historical linguistics

== F ==
- Fairuzabadi (Iran, 1329–1414), lexicography, Arabic grammar
- Farhady, Hossein (Iran, born 1947), Iranian applied linguist
- Fassi Fehri, Abdelkader (Morocco, 1947–), Arabic syntax
- Fierz-David, Linda (Germany, 1891–1955), philology
- Fillmore, Charles J. (United States, 1929–2014), syntax, lexical semantics, cognitive linguistics, lexicography
- Firbas, Jan (Czech Republic, 1921–2000), English language, functional linguistics
- Firth, John Rupert (UK, 1890–1960), phonetics, phonology, prosody
- Fischer-Jørgensen, Eli (Denmark 1911–2010), phonetics, phonology, Danish language
- Fishman, Joshua (United States, 1926–2015), sociology of language
- Fiske, Willard (United States, 1831–1904), Northern European languages, Icelandic language
- Fodor, Janet Dean (United States, 1942–2023), psycholinguistics, semantics, syntax
- Fodor, Jerry Alan (United States, 1935–2017), psycholinguistics, language of thought
- Foley, William A. (Australia, 1949–), Papuan languages, Austronesian languages
- Ford, Jeremiah Denis Mathias (United States, 1873–1958), Spanish language
- Fowler, Carol A. (United States), phonetics, phonology
- François, Alexandre (France), Austronesian languages, historical linguistics, language contact
- Freiman, Aleksandr Arnoldovich (Poland/Russia, 1879–1968), Iranian languages
- French, David Heath (United States, 1918–1994), Native American languages
- Friedrich, Johannes (Germany, 1893–1972), Hittite language
- Fromkin, Victoria (United States, 1923–2000), theoretical linguistics, constructed languages
- Fujitani Nariakira (Japan, 1738–1779), Japanese language

== G ==
- Galloway, Brent D. (United States, 1944–2014), Amerindian languages, Halkomelem language
- Gamkrelidze, Thomas V. (Georgia, 1929–2021), Indo-European studies, Georgian language
- Gans, Eric (United States, 1941–), origin of language
- Garnier, Romain (France, 1976–), Indo-European linguistics
- Gazdar, Gerald (UK, 1950–), computational linguistics, syntax, semantics
- Gebauer, Jan (Czech Republic, 1838–1907), Czech language
- Geeraerts, Dirk (Belgium, 1955–), semantics, lexicography
- van Geert, Paul (Netherlands, 1950–), second language development
- Giles, Howard (Wales/United States, 1946–), sociolinguistics
- Givón, Talmy (Israel/United States, 1936–), syntax, semantics, pragmatics, typology, functionalism
- Giegerich, Heinz (Germany/UK, 1952–), English language, phonology
- Gleason, Jean Berko (United States, 1931–), psycholinguistics, language acquisition
- Goatly, Andrew (UK), English language, Chinese language
- Goddard, Cliff (Australia, 1953–), semantics, pragmatics
- Goddard, R.H. Ives, III (United States, 1941–2025), Algonquian languages, historical linguistics
- Gode, Alexander (Germany/United States, 1906–1970), constructed languages, Germanic languages
- Goldberg, Adele (United States, 1963–), syntax, psycholinguistics
- Goldsmith, John Anton (United States, 1951–), phonology, computational linguistics
- Goldstein, Louis M. (United States), phonetics, phonology
- Gong Hwang-cherng (Republic of China, 1934–2010), Sino-Tibetan languages, Old Chinese, Tangut language
- Gordon, Cyrus Herzl (United States, 1908–2001), ancient languages, cuneiform script
- Gramsci, Antonio (Italy, 1891–1937), Italian language
- Gray, Louis Herbert (United States, 1875–1955), Indo-Iranian languages, phonology
- Green, Lisa (United States), syntax of African American English
- Greenberg, Joseph Harold (United States, 1915–2001), typology, language universals, languages of Africa
- Grenoble, Lenore (United States, 1958–), language contact, language endangerment, deixis, Slavic and Arctic Indigenous languages
- Grice, (Herbert) Paul (UK/United States, 1913–1988), pragmatics
- Grierson, George Abraham (Ireland, 1851–1941), languages of India
- Gries, Stefan Th. (Germany/United States, 1970–), corpus linguistics, computational linguistics, cognitive linguistics, construction grammar
- Grimm, Jakob Ludwig Carl (Germany, 1785–1863), historical linguistics, comparative linguistics, German language
- Grinder, John Thomas (United States, 1940–), neurolinguistics
- Gross, Maurice (France, 1934–2001), lexicon-grammar
- Grosz, Barbara J. (United States, 1948– ), natural language processing, computational modeling of discourse
- Groupe μ (Belgium, 1967–), rhetorics, semiotics
- Grube, Wilhelm (Germany, 1855–1908), Tungusic languages, Nivkh language, Jurchen language
- Grønnum, Nina (Denmark, 1945–), intonation of Danish
- Gumperz, John Joseph (United States, 1922–2013), sociolinguistics, discourse analysis, linguistic anthropology
- Gutiérrez Eskildsen, Rosario María (Mexico, 1899–1979), Spanish language, dialectology
- Guy, Gregory (United States, 1950–), sociolinguistics, historical linguistics, phonetics, phonology
- Guthrie, Malcolm (Britain, 1903–1972), Bantu languages
- Gygax, Pascal (Swiss, 1974–), inclusive language in French

== H ==
- Haarmann, Harald (Germany, 1946–), evolutionary linguistics, language contact
- Haas, Mary Rosamund (United States, 1910–1996), Native American languages, Thai language, historical linguistics
- Haase, Martin (Germany, 1962–), Romance languages
- Hagberg, Carl August (Sweden, 1810–1864), Scandinavian languages
- Hajič, Jan (Czech Republic), computational linguistics
- Hajičová, Eva (Czech Republic, 1935–), corpus linguistics
- Hale, Kenneth Locke (United States, 1934–2001), syntax, phonology
- Hall, Kira (United States, 1962–), sociocultural linguistics
- Hall, Robert A., Jr. (United States, 1911–1997), Romance languages, Pidgins and Creoles
- Halle, Morris (Latvia/United States, 1923–2018), phonology, morphology
- Halliday, Michael Alexander Kirkwood (UK/Australia, 1925–2018), systemic functional grammar, ecolinguistics, applied linguistics
- Hammarström, Harald (Sweden, 1977–), computational linguistics, historical linguistics, linguistic typology
- Hammond, Michael (United States, 1957–), phonology, computational linguistics, syntax
- Hamp, Eric P. (United States, 1920–2019), Indo-European languages, Native American languages
- Hanzeli, Victor (United States, 1925–1991), Romance languages
- Haq, Mehr Abdul (Pakistan, 1915–1995), Saraiki language
- Harder, Peter (Denmark, 1950–), English language, functional linguistics
- Harkavy, Alexander (Belarus/United States, 1863–1939), Yiddish language, lexicography
- Harley, Heidi B. (United States, 1969–), distributed morphology, syntax
- Harrington, John Peabody (United States, 1884–1961), Native American languages, phonetics
- Alice C. Harris (United States, 1947-), Kartvelian languages, historical linguistics
- Harris, Roy (UK, 1931–2015), semiology, integrationism
- Harris, Zellig Sabbetai (Ukraine/United States, 1909–1992), structural linguistics, discourse analysis, Semitic languages
- Harrison, K. David (United States, 1966–), phonology, endangered languages, language extinction
- Hartmann, Reinhard Rudolf Karl (Austria/UK, 1938–2024), lexicography, contrastive linguistics
- Hasan, Ruqaiya (India/Australia, 1931–2015), systemic functional grammar, sociolinguistics, applied linguistics
- Hashimoto Mantarō (Japan, 1932–1987), Japanese language
- Hashimoto Shinkichi (Japan, 1882–1945), Old Japanese language, Japanese language
- Haspelmath, Martin (Germany, 1963–), typology, language change, language contact, Lezgian language
- Haugen, Einar Ingvald (United States, 1906– 1994), sociolinguistics, Old Norse
- Hawkins, John A. (UK), psycholinguistics, historical linguistics
- Hayakawa, Samuel Ichiye (Canada/United States, 1906–1992), semantics
- Hayes, Bruce (United States, 1955–), phonology
- Hays, David Glenn (United States, 1928–1995), computational linguistics, machine translation, dependency grammar, corpus linguistics, natural language processing, cognitive science
- Heath, Jeffrey (United States, 1949–), historical linguistics, morphology, linguistic anthropology
- Heim, Irene Roswitha (Germany/United States, 1954–), semantics
- Heine, Bernd (Germany, 1939–), languages of Africa, sociolinguistics, language contact
- Hepburn, James Curtis (United States, 1815–1911), Japanese language, lexicography
- Herbert, Robert Knox (United States, 1952–2007), phonology, languages of Africa, sociolinguistics
- Hetzron, Robert (Hungary/United States, 1937–1997), Afro-Asiatic languages
- Hewitt, John Napoleon Brinton (United States, 1859–1937), Iroquoian languages
- Hjelmslev, Louis (Denmark, 1899–1965), comparative linguistics, semantics
- Hobbs, Jerry R. (United States, 1942–), computational linguistics, discourse analysis, syntax, semantics
- Hock, Hans Henrich (Germany/United States, 1938–), historical linguistics, comparative linguistics, Sanskrit
- Hockett, Charles Francis (United States, 1916–2000), phonology, morphology
- Hoey, Michael (UK, 1948–2021), lexical priming, textual interaction, corpus linguistics
- Hoff, Erika (United States, 1951—), Psycholinguistics
- Hoffmann, John-Baptist (Germany, 1857–1928), Mundari language
- Hogg, Richard M. (UK, 1944–2007), phonology, historical linguistics
- Hoijer, Harry (United States, 1904–1976), Athabaskan languages, Tonkawa language
- Hopper, Paul (UK/United States), historical linguistics, emergent grammar
- Hornstein, Norbert (United States), syntax
- Hryhorchuk, Lidiia (Ukraine, 1926–2018), Ukrainian language
- Hrozný, Bedřich (Czech Republic, 1879–1952), Hittite language, ancient languages
- Huddleston, Rodney D. (UK/Australia, 1937—), English language
- Hudson, Richard (UK, 1939–), syntax, word grammar, linguistics in education
- von Humboldt, Wilhelm (Germany, 1787–1835), Basque language
- Hunston, Susan (UK, 1953–), corpus linguistics, lexical semantics
- Hupel, August Wilhelm (Germany/Estonia, 1737–1819), Estonian language, lexicography
- Hurford, James R. (UK, United States, 1941–), phonetics, semantics, grammar, computational linguistics, evolutionary linguistics
- Husain Khan, Masud (India, 1919–2010), Urdu language, phonetics, stylistics, linguistic description
- Hyman, Larry M. (United States, 1947–), phonology, languages of Africa
- Hymes, Dell Hathaway (United States, 1927–2009), sociolinguistics, Kathlamet language

== I ==
- Ibn Sidah (Andalusia, c. 1007–1066)
- Ibn Manzur (c. 1233–1311/1312)
- Ibn Jinni (c. 932–1002)
- Illich-Svitych, Vladislav Markovich (Ukraine/Russia, 1934–1966), comparative linguistics, Nostratic languages
- Ivanov, Aleksei Ivanovich (Russia, 1878–1937), Chinese language, Tangut language
- Ivanov, Vyacheslav Vsevolodovich (Russia, 1929–2017), Indo-European studies
- Ivić, Pavle (Serbia, 1924–1999), South Slavic languages, phonology, Serbo-Croatian language

== J ==
- Jackendoff, Ray (United States, 1945–), syntax, lexical semantics
- Jackson, Abraham Valentine Williams (United States, 1862—1937), Indo-Iranian languages, Avestan language
- Jackson, Kenneth Hurlstone (UK, 1909—1991), Brythonic languages, Gaelic languages
- Jacobsen, Lis (1882–1961), Danish and Nordic languages
- Jacques, Guillaume (France, 1979—), Old Chinese, Rgyalrongic languages, Tangut language
- Jagić, Vatroslav (Croatia, 1838—1923), Croatian language, Slavic languages
- Jakobson, Roman Osipovich (Russia/Czech Republic/United States, 1896—1982), structuralism, phonology
- Jarring, Gunnar (Sweden, 1907—2002), Turkic languages
- Jasanoff, Jay (United States, 1942–), Indo-European linguistics
- Jaszczolt, Katarzyna (UK, 1963—), semantics, pragmatics, philosophy of language
- Jaunius, Kazimieras (Lithuania, 1848—1908), Lithuanian language, comparative linguistics
- Jendraschek, Gerd (Germany), Basque language, Turkish language, Iatmul language
- Jensen, Eva Skafte (Denmark, 1966—), Danish language
- Jespersen, Otto (Denmark, 1860—1943), English language, phonetics, constructed languages
- Johnson, David E. (United States, 1946–), syntax
- Jones, Daniel (UK, 1881—1967), phonetics
- Jones, Sir William (UK, 1746—1794), Indo-European studies, Sanskrit, comparative linguistics
- Joshi, Aravind Krishana (India/United States, 1929–2017), computational linguistics
- Junast (PR China, 1934–2010), Mongolian language, Monguor language, Eastern Yugur language, Phags-pa script
- Jurafsky, Daniel (United States, 1962—), computational linguistics

== K ==
- Kaplan, Ronald M. (United States, 1946—), computational linguistics
- Karadžić, Vuk Stefanović (Serbia, 1787—1864), Serbian language, lexicography
- Kari, James (United States), Native American languages
- Kasravi, Ahmad (Iran, 1890—1946), ancient languages, Iranian languages
- Katz, Jerrold J. (United States, 1932—2002), semantics, generative grammar
- Kaufman, Terrence (United States, 1937—2022), historical linguistics, contact linguistics, Mesoamerican languages
- Kay, Martin (UK, United States, 1935–2021), computational linguistics
- Kay, Paul (United States, 1934—), construction grammar
- Kayne, Richard S. (United States, 1944—), syntax, transformational grammar
- Kazama Kiyozō (Japan, 1928–), Japanese language
- Keating, Patricia (United States, 1952—), phonetics
- Kellogg, Samuel H. (United States, 1839–1899), Hindi language
- Kenyon, John Samuel (United States, 1874—1959), English language, lexicography, phonology
- Keyser, Samuel Jay (United States, 1935–), phonology, English language
- Kiesling, Scott Fabius (United States), sociolinguistics
- Kindaichi Haruhiko (Japan, 1913–2004), Japanese language
- Kindaichi Kyōsuke (Japan, 1882–1971), Ainu language
- Kinkade, M. Dale (United States, 1933—2004), Salishan languages
- Kiparsky, Paul (Finland/United States, 1941–), phonology, morphology
- Kirby, Simon (UK), computational linguistics, evolutionary linguistics
- Klima, Edward (United States, 1931—2008), sign language
- Klinkenberg, Jean-Marie (Belgium, 1944–), rhetorics, semiotics, stylistics
- Kloekhorst, Alwin (Netherlands, 1978–), Anatolian languages
- Knechtges, David R. (United States, 1942–), East Asian languages, Chinese language
- Knorozov, Yuri Valentinovich (Russia, 1922—1999), Maya hieroglyphics, writing systems
- Kober, Alice (UK/United States, 1906—1950), Linear B
- Komárek, Miroslav (Czechia, 1924–2013), Czech language, morphology, phonology
- Kordić, Snježana (Croatia, 1964–), Serbo-Croatian language, syntax, sociolinguistics
- Kornai András (Hungary/United States, 1957–), mathematical linguistics, phonology, morphology, Hungarian language, syntax
- Kornfilt, Jaklin, theoretical linguistics, syntax, morphology, Turkic languages, Germanic languages
- Korsakov, Andrey Konstantinovich (Russia/Ukraine, 1916—2007), Germanic languages, English language, morphology, syntax
- Kortlandt, Frederik (Netherlands, 1946–), historical linguistics, Indo-European linguistics, Balto-Slavic languages
- Korzybski, Alfred Habdank Skarbek (Poland/United States, 1879—1950), general semantics
- Koster, Jan (Netherlands, 1945–), generative grammar
- Krahe, Hans (Germany, 1898—1965), Indo-European languages, Illyrian language
- Krashen, Stephen (United States, 1941–), second-language acquisition
- Kratzer, Angelika (United States/Germany), semantics
- Krauss, Michael E. (United States, 1941–2019), Native American languages
- Krishnamurti, Bhadriraju (India, 1929–2012), Dravidian languages
- Kroeber, Alfred Louis (United States, 1876—1960), Native American languages
- Kučera, Henry (Czech Republic/United States, 1925–2010), computational linguistics
- Kuiper, F. B. J. (Netherlands, 1907–2003), historical linguistics, Indo-European linguistics, and Sanskrit
- Kuno Susumu (Japan/United States, 1933–), Dravidian languages, Japanese language, syntax
- Kurath, Hans (Austria/United States, 1891—1992), English language, lexicography, dialectology
- Kuroda Shigeyuki (Japan, 1934–2009), Japanese language
- Kuryłowicz, Jerzy (Poland, 1895—1978), Indo-European languages, syntax, morphology
- Kvergić, Hermann Feodor (Slovakia, 1895–sometime after 1948), Turkish language
- Kychanov, Evgenij Ivanovich (Russia, 1932–2013), Tangut language

== L ==
- Labov, William (United States, 1927–2024), sociolinguistics, English dialectology, phonology
- Lado, Robert (United States, 1915–1995), applied linguistics, contrastive analysis
- Ladefoged, Peter Nielsen (UK/United States, 1925–2006), phonetics, endangered languages
- Laird, Charlton (United States, 1901–1984), lexicography, English language
- Lakoff, George P. (United States, 1941–), cognitive linguistics, transformational grammar, generative semantics, syntax
- Lakoff, Robin Tolmach (United States, 1942–2025), sociolinguistics
- Lamb, Sydney MacDonald (United States, 1929–), stratificational grammar, Native American languages, historical linguistics, computational linguistics
- Lambdin, Thomas Oden (United States, 1927–2020), Semitic languages, Egyptian language
- Lane, Harlan (United States, 1936–2019), speech, Deaf culture, sign language
- Langacker, Ronald W. (United States, 1942–), cognitive linguistics
- Langdon, Margaret (United States, 1926–2005), Native American languages
- LaPolla, Randy J. (United States), morpho-syntax, Chinese, Qiang, Rawang
- Lasersohn, Peter (United States), semantics
- Lasnik, Howard (United States, 1945–), syntax
- Laycock, Donald (Australia, 1936–1988), languages of Papua New Guinea
- Leech, Geoffrey (UK, 1936–2014), applied linguistics, English language
- Lees, Robert (United States, 1922–1996), machine translation
- Lehiste, Ilse (United States, 1922–2010), phonetics, Estonian language, Serbo-Croatian, phonology
- Lehmann, Winfred P. (United States, 1916– 2007), historical linguistics, Proto-Indo-European language
- Leonard, Robert A. (United States), Forensic linguistics
- Lepsius, Karl Richard (Germany, 1810– 1884), Egyptian language, Nubian languages, phonology
- Leslau, Wolf (Polish-born American, 1906–2006), Semitic languages, Languages of Ethiopia
- Leskien, August (Germany, 1840–1916), comparative linguistics, Baltic languages, Slavic languages
- Levin, Beth (United States, 1955–), semantics
- Levinson, Stephen C. (UK/Netherlands, 1947–), pragmatics
- Levstik, Fran (Slovenia, 1831–1881), Slovene language
- Li Fanwen (PR China, 1932–), Tangut language
- Li, Fang-Kuei (China/United States, 1902–1987), Mattole language, Tai languages, Old Chinese, Tibetan language
- Li, Paul Jen-kuei (Taiwan, 1936–), Formosan languages, Austronesian languages, historical linguistics, lexicography
- Liberman, Alvin Meyer (United States, 1917–2000), speech perception, phonology
- Liberman, Anatoly (Russia/United States, 1937–), etymology, Germanic languages
- Liberman, Mark (United States), phonetics, prosody
- Lieber, Rochelle (United States, 1954–), morphology, syntax, lexical semantics
- Lieberman, Philip (United States, 1934–2022), phonetics, language evolution
- Lillo-Martin, Diane (United States), signed languages
- Lisker, Leigh (United States, 1918–2006), phonetics, Dravidian languages
- Local, John (UK, 1947–), phonetics, phonology, conversation analysis
- López Sández, María (Spain, born 1973), Galician philologist and essayist
- Lounsbury, Floyd Glenn (United States, 1914–1998), Native American languages, Mayan languages
- Lowman, Guy Sumner, Jr. (United States, 1909–1941), phonetics
- Ludlow, Peter (United States, 1957–), syntax, semantics
- Lukoff, Fred (United States, 1920–2000), Korean language, phonology
- Lunde, Ken (United States, 1965–), East Asian languages
- Lynch, John (Australia, 1946–2021), Austronesian languages, historical linguistics

== M ==
- MacWhinney, Brian (United States, 1945–), language acquisition, second-language acquisition, corpus linguistics
- Maddieson, Ian (United States, 1942–), phonetics
- Fray Francisco Maldonado (1571– c. 1640), Guatemalan Franciscan linguist and historian
- Manzini, Rita (Italy), generative syntax, Romance languages
- Malkiel, Yakov (United States, 1914–1998), etymology, philology
- Manaster Ramer, Alexis (United States/Poland, 1956–), phonology, syntax, poetics, etymology
- Marantz, Alec (United States, 1959–), distributed morphology
- March, Francis Andrew (United States, 1825–1911), comparative linguistics, lexicography, Old English language, English language
- Margolis, Max Leopold (Lithuania/United States, 1866–1932), Semitic languages
- Marr, Nikolay Yakovlevich (Georgia/Russia, 1865–1934), historical linguistics, comparative linguistics, origin of language
- Martin, James (Sydney, Australia, 1950–), genre
- Martin, Samuel Elmo (United States, 1924–2009), Korean language, Japanese language
- Martinet, André (France, 1908–1999), structuralism, historical linguistics, constructed languages
- Martinet, Jeanne (France, 1920–2018), semiotics, constructed languages
- Massam, Diane (Canada), syntax, Austronesian languages
- Matasović, Ranko (Croatia, 1968–), historical linguistics, Celtic languages
- Mathesius, Vilém (Czech Republic, 1882– 1945), phonology, syntax, English language, Czech language
- Matisoff, James A. (United States, 1937–), Tibeto-Burman languages, phonology
- Matthews, Peter Hugoe (UK, 1934–2023), morphology, syntax
- Matthews, Stephen (UK/PR China), typology, syntax, semantics, Cantonese language
- Mattingly, Ignatius G. (United States, 1927–2004), phonetics, speech synthesis, speech perception
- Matveyev, Aleksandr (Russia, 1926–2010), onomastics, etymology
- McArthur, Tom (UK, 1938–2020), English language, lexicography
- McCarthy, John J. (United States, 1953–), phonology, morphology, optimality theory
- McCawley, James D. (UK/United States, 1938–1999), syntax, semantics, phonology
- McConnell-Ginet, Sally (United States, 1938–), language of gender and sexuality
- McCulloch, Gretchen (Canada), internet linguistics
- McCune, George McAfee (North Korea/United States, 1908–1988), Korean language
- McNamara, Barbara (United States, 1942–), Chinese language
- McGregor, William B. (Australia, 1952–), Australian Aboriginal languages, theoretical linguistics, Shua language
- McWhorter, John Hamilton (United States, 1965–), creole languages, Saramaccan language
- Meillet, Antoine (France, 1866–1936), Comparative Linguistics, Armenian language, Philology
- Meinhof, Carl Friedrich Michael (Germany, 1857–1944), languages of Africa
- Melchert, H. Craig (United States, 1945–), Anatolian languages
- Merchant, Jason (United States, 1966–), syntax, semantics, ellipsis
- Michaelis, Laura A. (United States), syntax, English language
- Michaud, Alexis (France, 1975–), Phonetics, Tonology, Naish languages, Vietnamese
- Miklosich, Franz (Slovenia/Austria, 1813–1891), Slavic languages
- Miller, Wick R. (United States, 1932–1994), Keresan languages, Uto-Aztecan languages
- Miller, Roy Andrew (United States, 1924–2014), Tibetan language, Japanese language
- Mithun, Marianne (United States, 1946–), Native American languages
- Mitxelena Elissalt, Koldo (Spain, 1915–1987), Basque language
- Miura Tsutomu (Japan, 1911–1989), Japanese language
- Miyake, Marc (United States, 1971–), historical linguistics, Old Japanese, Tangut language
- Mönkh-Amgalan, Yümjiriin (Mongolia, 1956–), pragmatics, semantics, syntax, Mongolian language, dialectology
- Mori Hiromichi (Japan, 1949–), Japanese language
- Moskvin, Anatoly (Russia, 1966–), academic and linguist, arrested in 2011 after the bodies of 26 mummified young women were discovered in his home
- Motoori Norinaga (Japan, 1730–1801), Japanese language
- Motoori Haruniwa (Japan, 1763–1828), Japanese language
- Montague, Richard Merett (United States, 1930–1971), semantics, philosophy of language
- Moro, Andrea (Italy, 1962–), syntax, copula, expletive, antisymmetry, neurolinguistics
- Moser, Edward W. (United States, 1924–1976), Seri language
- Mufwene, Salikoko (United States), creole languages, African-American English, language evolution
- Mulder, Jean (United States, 1954–), Australian English, Tsimshianic languages
- Munro, Pamela (United States, 1947–), Native American languages, lexicography
- Murayama Shichirō (Japan, 1908–1995), Japanese language
- Murray, James (UK, 1837–1915), lexicography, English language, etymology
- Muti’I, Ibrahim (China, 1920–2010), Uyghur language
- Myers-Scotton, Carol (United States, 1934–), language contact

== N ==
- Nábělková, Mira (Slovakia, 1956–), lexical semantics, sociolinguistics
- Nádasdy, Ádám (Hungary, 1947–2026), phonology, morphophonology
- Napoli, Donna Jo (United States, 1948–), syntax, phonetics, phonology, Japanese language
- Neeleman, Ad (Netherlands/UK, 1964–), syntax, semantics, phonology, generative grammar
- Nelson, Andrew Nathaniel (United States, 1893–1975), Japanese language, lexicography
- Nevsky, Nikolai Aleksandrovich (Russia, 1892– 1937), Tangut language
- Newman, Paul (United States, 1937-), African languages
- Newmeyer, Frederick J. (United States, 1944–), syntax, origin of language
- Nichols, Johanna (United States, 1945–), languages of the Caucasus, Chechen language, Ingush language, typology
- Niftawayh (Iraq, c. 8585–935), Arabic grammar, lexicography
- Nishida Tatsuo (Japan, 1928–2012), Tangut language
- Nolan, Francis (UK), phonetics
- Noreen, Adolf Gotthard (Sweden, 1854–1925), dialectology, historical linguistics, Germanic languages
- Nunberg, Geoffrey (United States, 1945–2020), lexical semantics, English language

== O ==
- Odden, David A. (United States, 1954–), phonology, African linguistics, Bantu languages
- Odin, Louise (Switzerland, 1836–1909), Blonay dialect linguist, dialect researcher and author
- Ogilvie, Sarah (Australia)
- Ohala, John (United States, 1941–2020), phonetics, phonology
- Okrand, Marc (United States, 1948–), Klingon language, Mutsun language
- Ōno Susumu (Japan, 1919–2008), Japanese language, Tamil language
- Orešnik, Janez (Slovenia, 1935–), comparative linguistics
- Orikuchi Shinobu (Japan, 1887–1953), Japanese language
- Orton, Harold (UK, 1898–1975), phonology, dialectology, English dialects
- Osthoff, Hermann (Germany, 1847–1909), Indo-European studies, historical linguistics
- Ōtsuki Fumihiko (Japan, 1847–1928), Japanese language
- Özyürek, Aslı, psycholinguistics, neurolinguistics

== P ==
- Pāṇini (India, ca. 520–460 BC), Sanskrit, morphology, descriptive linguistics, generative linguistics
- Frank R. Palmer (England, 1922–2019), semantics, English language, Ethiopian languages
- Partee, Barbara Hall (United States, 1940–), semantics
- Paul, Hermann Otto Theodor (Germany, 1846–1921), lexicography, German language
- Pawley, Andrew Kenneth (Australia/New Zealand, 1941–2026), Austronesian languages, Papuan languages, lexicography, phraseology
- Peacock, Dmitri Rudolf (Britain, 1842–1892), Kartvelian languages
- Pedersen, Holger (Denmark, 1867–1953), Celtic languages, historical linguistics, Nostratic languages
- Pedersen, Johannes (Denmark, 1883–1977), Hebrew language
- Pei, Mario Andrew (Italy/United States, 1901–1978), Italian language, Indo-European languages
- Pesetsky, David Michael (United States, 1957–), transformational grammar
- Keith Malcolm Petyt (UK, 1941–), sociolinguistics
- Phillipson, Robert (UK/Denmark, 1942–), language policy
- Pierrehumbert, Janet (United States, 1954–), phonetics, phonology
- Piller, Ingrid (Australia, 1967–), applied linguistics, sociolinguistics, intercultural communication
- Pinault, Georges-Jean (France, 1955–), Tokharian, Indo-European linguistics
- Pike, Kenneth Lee (United States, 1912–2000), English language, constructed languages, tagmemics
- Pilch, Herbert (Germany, 1927–2018), Old English, Celtic languages, phonetics
- Pimsleur, Paul (United States, 1927–1976), language acquisition, French language, phonetics
- Pinker, Steven (Canada/United States, 1954–), language acquisition, syntax, semantics
- Piron, Claude (Switzerland, 1931–2008), Esperanto, psycholinguistics
- Polinsky, Maria (United States), syntax, Austronesian languages
- Pollard, Carl Jesse (United States, 1947–), syntax, semantics
- Pollock, Jean-Yves (France, 1946–), syntax
- Poplack, Shana (United States), sociolinguistics
- Poppe, Nicholas (Russia, 1897–1991), Mongolic languages
- Postal, Paul M. (United States, 1936–), syntax, semantics
- Pou, Saveros (Cambodia/France, 1929-2020), Khmer
- Primer, Sylvester (United States, 1842–1912), English language, dialectology, phonetics, Germanic languages
- Prince, Alan Sanford (United States, 1946–), optimality theory, phonology
- Prince, Ellen (United States, 1944–2010), pragmatics
- Pulgram, Ernst (Austria/United States, 1915– 2005), Romance languages, Italic languages
- Pullum, Geoffrey K. (UK/United States, 1945–), syntax, English language
- Pustejovsky, James D. (United States, 1956–), natural language processing, computational linguistics, semantics

== Q ==
- Quirk, Charles Randolph (UK/Germany, 1920–2017), English language

== R ==
- Radford, Andrew (UK, 1945–), syntax, generative grammar, child language acquisition
- Rael, Juan Bautista (United States, 1900–1993), phonology, morphology, New Mexican Spanish
- Rankin, Robert L. (United States, 1939–2014), historical linguistics and Siouan-Catawban linguistics
- Rask, Rasmus Christian (Denmark, 1787–1832), lexicography, comparative linguistics, Indo-European language
- Ratliff, Martha (United States, 1946–), Hmong–Mien languages, historical linguistics
- Rauch, Irmengard (United States, 1933–), Germanic languages, semiotics
- Read, Allen Walker (United States, 1906–2002), etymology, lexicography, English language
- Reinhart, Tanya (Israel, 1943–2007), syntax
- Rice, Keren (Canada), phonology, morphology, Athapaskan languages
- Rickford, John Russell (United States, 1949–), sociolinguistics, African-American English
- van Riemsdijk, Henk (Netherlands, 1948–), prepositional phrases, free relatives, syntax, Germanic language
- Rizzi, Luigi (Italy, 1952–), syntax, language acquisition
- Roberts, Ian G. (UK, 1957–), syntax
- Rock, Joseph Francis Charles (Austria/United States/PR China, 1884–1962), Naxi language, lexicography
- Rosenblat, Ángel (Poland/Venezuela, 1902–1984), lexicography, Venezuelan Spanish, Philology
- Ross, John Robert (United States, 1938–2025), semantics, syntax
- Ross, Malcolm David (Australia, 1942–), Austronesian languages, Papuan languages, historical linguistics, language contact
- Rubach, Jerzy (Poland/United States, 1948–), phonology, Polish language
- Rubin, Philip E. (United States, 1949–), articulatory synthesis, phonology
- Ruhlen, Merritt (United States, 1944–2021), typology, historical linguistics

== S ==
- Sacks, Harvey (United States, 1935–1975), conversation analysis
- Sadock, Jerrold (United States), syntax, morphology, pragmatics, Greenlandic language, Yiddish language
- Sag, Ivan (United States, 1949–2013), syntax, construction grammar
- Sagart, Laurent (France, 1951–), Chinese linguistics and Austronesian languages
- Sakaguchi, Alicja (Poland/Germany, 1954–), interlinguistics, Esperanto
- Shakirova, Liya (Soviet Union/Russia, 1921–2015), Russian language
- Salo, David (United States, 1969–), constructed languages, Tocharian languages, Elvish languages
- Sampson, Geoffrey (UK, 1944–), philosophy of language
- Sánchez Carrión, José María (Spain, 1952–), Basque language, sociolinguistics, historical linguistics
- Sanders, Ted (Netherlands, 1963–), Coherence in text, discourse
- Sankoff, Gillian (Canada, 1943–), sociolinguistics
- Sankrityayan, Rahul (India, 1893–1963), Tibetan language, Hindi language
- Sapir, Edward (Germany/United States, 1884–1939), Native American languages, constructed languages, semantics
- Sarkar, Prabhat Ranjan (India, 1921–1990), Transliteration, Science of Letters
- Saunders, Irene (United States/PR China), lexicography, Chinese language
- de Saussure, Ferdinand (Switzerland/France, 1857–1913), semantics, Indo-European studies, structural linguistics
- Saxon, Leslie (Canada), First Nations languages
- Sayce, Archibald Henry (UK, 1846–1933), Akkadian language
- Schegloff, Emanuel (United States, 1937–), conversation analysis
- Schleicher, August (Germany, 1821–1868), Indo-European studies, language development, historical linguistics
- Schmidt, Johannes (Germany, 1843–1901), historical linguistics, Indo-European studies
- Schmidt, Richard (United States, 1941–2017), second-language acquisition
- Schmidt, Wilhelm (Germany/Austria/Switzerland, 1868–1954), Mon–Khmer languages
- Searle, John Rogers (United States, 1932–), philosophy of language, pragmatics
- Selinker, Larry (United States), second-language acquisition
- Sen, Sukumar (India, 1900–1992), Bengali language
- Sequoyah (United States, 1767–1843), Cherokee language
- Setälä, Eemil Nestor (Finland, 1864–1935), Finnish language, Uralic languages
- Sgall, Petr (Czech Republic, 1926–2019), syntax
- Shackle, Christopher (UK, 1942–), Urdu language, Saraiki language
- Shepard-Kegl, Judy (United States, 1953– ), Nicaraguan Sign Language
- Shevoroshkin, Vitaly Victorovich (Russia/United States, 1932–), Slavic languages, Nostratics
- Shinmura Izuru (Japan, 1876–1967), Japanese language
- Shipley, William F. (United States, 1921-2011), Maidu language
- Sibawayh (Iran, ca. 760– 796), Arabic language
- Sidi Boushaki (Algeria, ca. 796–857), Arabic language
- Sievers, Eduard (Germany, 1850–1932), Germanic languages, historical linguistics
- Siewierska, Anna (Poland/Netherlands/UK, 1955–2011), language typology
- Sihler, Andrew Littleton (United States, 1941–), comparative linguistics, Indo-European languages
- Silvet, Johannes (Estonia, 1895–1979), lexicography
- Sinclair, John McHardy (UK, 1933–2007), applied linguistics, corpus linguistics, discourse analysis
- Skeat, Walter W. (UK, 1835–1912), Old English, Middle English, etymology, philology
- Skinner, B.F. (United States, 1905–1992), verbal behavior
- Skousen, Royal (United States, 1945–), language modeling
- Smith, Neilson Voyne (UK, 1939–), syntax, language acquisition
- Smith-Stark, Thomas (United States, 1948–2009), Mesoamerican languages
- Smolensky, Paul (United States, 1955–), phonology, optimality theory, syntax
- Stachowski, Marek (Poland, 1957–), historical linguistics, Turkic languages
- Starostin, Georgiy Sergeevich (Russia, 1976–), comparative linguistics, historical linguistics, Nostratics, Proto-World
- Starostin, Sergei Anatolyevich (Russia, 1953–2005), comparative linguistics, historical linguistics, Nostratics, Proto-World
- Stati, Sorin (Romania-French, 1931–2008), pragmatics, syntax
- Steedman, Mark (UK, United States, 1946–), theoretical linguistics, categorial grammar, syntax, computational linguistics
- Steels, Luc (Belgium, 1952–), computational linguistics, evolutionary linguistics
- Steinmetz, Sol (United States, 1930–2011), Yiddish language
- Stetson, Raymond Herbert (United States, d. 1950), phonetics
- Stieber, Zdzisław (Poland, 1903–1980), Slavic languages, phonology
- Stokoe, William (United States, 1919–2000), American Sign Language, cherology
- Stollznow, Karen (United States, 1976–), lexical semantics, sociolinguistics, cognitive linguistics
- Stuart-Smith, Jane (United Kingdom, 1965–), phonetics, sociolinguistics
- Suzuki Takao (Japan, 1926–2021), Japanese language, sociolinguistics
- Svoboda, Aleš (Czech Republic, 1941–2010), English language, Czech language, functional linguistics
- Swadesh, Morris (United States, 1909–1967), typology, historical linguistics, Native American languages, lexicostatistics
- de Swart, Henriette (Netherlands, 1961–), semantics
- Sweet, Henry (UK, 1845–1912), Germanic languages, phonetics
- Sweetser, Eve (United States), cognitive linguistics, semantics, historical linguistics, Celtic languages

== T ==
- Talmy, Leonard (United States, 1942–), cognitive linguistics, semantics, Yiddish language, Native American languages
- Tannen, Deborah Frances (United States, 1945–), discourse analysis
- Tarone, Elaine (United States, 1962–), second-language acquisition
- Tarpent, Marie-Lucie (Canada, 1941–), Tsimshianic languages
- Tha Myat (Burma, 1899–1977), Mon language, Burmese language, Pyu language, Nagari
- Teeter, Karl van Duyn (United States, 1929– 2007), Algic languages, endangered languages
- Thieberger, Nicholas (Australia), Indigenous Australian languages
- Thomas, Calvin (United States, 1854–1919), Germanic languages, German language
- Thomason, Sarah Grey (United States, 1939–), language contact, historical linguistics, typology, Montana Salish
- Thompson, John Eric Sidney (UK, 1898– 1975), Maya languages, Maya hieroglyphics
- Thompson, Sandra A. (United States, 1941–), syntax, discourse analysis, Mandarin language
- Tokieda Motoki (Japan, 1900–1967), Japanese language
- Tolkien, John Ronal Reuel (UK, 1892–1973), Old English language, constructed languages, Sindarin, Quenya
- Toporišič, Jože (Slovenia, 1926–2014), Slovene language
- Trager, George Leonard (United States, 1906–1992), phonemics, paralanguage, semantics
- Trask, Robert Lawrence (United States, 1944–2004), Basque language, historical linguistics, origin of language
- Traugott, Elizabeth C. (United States, 1939–), grammaticalization
- Troy, Jakelin (Australia, 1960–), Aboriginal Australian languages, language revival, indigenous languages of Pakistan
- Trubetzkoy, Nikolai Sergeyevich (Russia/Austria, 1890–1938), structural linguistics, morphology, phonology
- Trudgill, Peter (UK, 1943–), sociolinguistics, English language, dialectology
- Tuite, Kevin (United States, 1954–), Caucasian languages, Georgian language
- Turin, Mark (UK, 1973–), Himalayan languages, endangered languages
- Turner, Mark (United States, 1954–), cognitive linguistics
- Tucker, Archibald (South Africa, 1904–1980), African languages

== U ==
- Ueda, Kazuo (Japan, born 1942 or 1943), Yiddishist
- Uldall, Elizabeth T. (United States, 1913–2004), phonetics
- Uldall, Hans Jørgen (Denmark, 1907–1957), glossematics, Maidu language
- Ullendorff, Edward (UK, 1920–2011), Semitic languages
- Unger, James Marshall (United States, 1947–), Japanese language, historical linguistics, writing systems
- Upton, Clive (UK, 1946–), English language, sociolinguistics, dialectology

== V ==
- Vajda, Edward (United States, 1958–), Ket language, historical linguistics, Na-Dené languages, comparative linguistics
- van Valin, Robert D. (United States, 1952–), syntax, semantics, cognitive linguistics
- van Wijk, Nicolaas (Netherlands, 1880–1941), historical linguistics, Balto-Slavic languages
- Valli, Clayton (United States, 1951–2003), American Sign Language,
- Vasmer, Max (Russia/Germany, 1886–1962), etymology, historical linguistics, Russian language
- Vassalli, Mikiel Anton (Malta, 1764–1829), Maltese language
- Vaux, Bert (United States, 1968–), phonology, morphology, Armenian language
- Veltman, Calvin (United States/Canada/France, 1941–), sociolinguistics
- Vendler, Zeno (United States, 1921–2004), philosophy of language, event structure
- Ventris, Michael George Francis (UK, 1922–1956), Linear B, Archaic Greek
- Verner, Karl (Denmark, 1846–1896), phonology, comparative linguistics, historical linguistics
- Vincent, Nigel (UK, 1947–), morphology, syntax, historical linguistics
- Voegelin, Charles F. (United States, 1906–1986), indigenous languages of North America
- Voegelin, Florence M. (United States, 1927–1989), Hidatsa language
- Voloshinov, Valentin Nikolaevich (Russia, 1895–1936), semantics
- Vovin, Alexander (Russia/United States, 1961–2022), Japanese language, Siberian languages, Korean language, Ainu language, Central Asian languages

== W ==
- Wackernagel, Jacob (Switzerland, 1853–1938), Indo-European studies, Sanskrit
- Wang Li (PR China, 1900–1986), Chinese language
- Watanabe Shōichi (Japan, 1930–2017), Japanese language
- Watkins, Calvert (United States, 1933–2013), comparative linguistics, Indo-European languages
- Weeks, Raymond (United States, 1863–1954), phonetics, French language
- Weinreich, Max (Latvia/United States, 1893– 1969), Yiddish language
- Weinreich, Uriel (Poland/United States, 1926–1967), sociolinguistics, dialectology, semantics, Yiddish language
- Wells, John Christopher (UK, 1939–), phonetics, Esperanto
- Westermann, Diedrich Hermann (Germany, 1875–1956), languages of Africa, typology
- Westphal, Ernst Oswald Johannes (South Africa/UK, 1919–1990), Bantu languages, Khoisan languages
- Whalen, Douglas H. (United States), phonology, endangered languages
- Wheeler, Benjamin Ide (United States, 1854–1927), historical linguistics, comparative linguistics, Greek language
- White, Lydia (UK/Canada, 1946–), second-language acquisition
- Whitney, William Dwight (United States, 1827–1894), lexicography, Sanskrit, English language
- Wilks, Yorick (UK, 1939–2023), artificial intelligence, computational linguistics, natural language processing, semantics
- Whorf, Benjamin Lee (United States, 1897–1941), Native American languages, Maya script, linguistic relativity
- Wichmann, Søren (Denmark, 1964–), Mesoamerican languages, Mixe–Zoque languages, Mayan languages, Maya script
- Widdowson, Henry G. (UK, 1935–), English language, discourse analysis
- Wierzbicka, Anna (Poland/Australia, 1938–), semantics, pragmatics
- Wiese, Richard (Germany, 1953–), phonology, morphology, neurolinguistics
- Williams, Nicholas Jonathan Anselm (UK/Ireland, 1942–), Cornish language, Irish language, Manx language, phonology
- Williams, Samuel Wells (United States/China, 1812–1884), Chinese language, lexicography
- Wilson, Robert Dick (United States, 1856–1930), comparative linguistics, Hebrew language, Syriac language
- Wittmann, Henri (France/Canada, 1937–), French language, creole languages, morphology, comparative linguistics
- Wodak, Ruth (Austria/UK, 1950–), discourse analysis
- Wolvengrey, Arok (Canada, 1965–), Cree language, syntax, Native American languages, lexicography
- Worcester, Samuel (1798–1859), Presbyterian missionary, linguist, co-founder of Cherokee Phoenix with Elias Boudinot (first Cherokee newspaper in Indian Territory)
- Wright, Alfred (United States, 1788–1853), Presbyterian minister, physician, linguist, Choctaw language
- Wurm, Stephen Adolphe (Hungary/Australia, 1922–2001), Australian Aboriginal languages, Papuan languages

== Y ==
- Yeda Pessoa de Castro (Brazil), African languages
- Yamada Yoshio (Japan, 1873–1958), Japanese language
- Yiakoumetti, Androula (Cyprus), Greek language, dialectology
- Yip, Virginia (Hong Kong, 1962–), bilingual language acquisition, Sinitic grammar
- Yngve, Victor (United States, 1920–2012), computational linguistics, natural language processing
- Young, Robert W. (United States, 1912–2007), Navajo language, lexicography

== Z ==
- Zamenhof, Ludwik Łazarz (Poland, 1859–1917), Esperanto
- Zepeda, Ofelia (United States, 1952–), O'odham language
- Zhang, Niina Ning (PR China), formal syntax, morphology
- Zhou Youguang (PR China, 1906–2017), orthography, Romanization of Chinese
- Zuazo, Koldo (Spain, 1956–), Basque dialectology, sociolinguistics
- Zuckermann, Ghil'ad (Israel, Italy, UK, Australia, 1971–), contact linguistics, lexicology, revival linguistics
- Zwicky, Arnold (United States, 1940–), syntax, morphology

== See also ==
- List of women linguists
- List of Russian linguists and philologists
- List of Jewish American linguists
- List of lexicographers
