= Motoki =

- Gender: Male

Origin
- Origin: Japanese
- Meaning: Different meanings depending on the kanji used

Motoki (written: 元気, 昌樹, 誠記, 基輝, or モトキ in katakana) is a masculine Japanese given name. Notable people with the name include:

- Motoki Kawasaki (川崎 元気; born 1979), Japanese footballer
- Motoki Nishimura (西村 昌樹; born 1947), Japanese judoka
- Motoki Ochiai (落合 モトキ; born 1990), Japanese actor
- Motoki Takagi (高城 元気; born 1980), Japanese voice actor and singer
- Motoki Tokieda (時枝 誠記; 1900–1967), Japanese academic and linguist

Motoki (written: 本木, 元木 or 端木) is also a Japanese surname. Notable people with the surname include:

- Katsuhide Motoki (本木 克英; born 1963), Japanese film director and producer
- Masahiro Motoki (本木 雅弘; born 1965), Japanese actor
- Masakazu Motoki (端木 正和; born 1971), Chinese businessman
- Seiya Motoki (元木 聖也; born 1993), Japanese actor
- Yasutoshi Motoki (元木 康年; born 1969), Japanese sport wrestler
- Yukio Motoki (元木 由記雄; born 1971), Japanese rugby union player
