= Niina =

Niina is a Finnish feminine given name, the Finnish version of Nina; it is also used in Japanese to transliterate the name Nina.

Niina may refer to the following notable people:

- Niina Kelo (born 1980), Finnish pentathlete
- Niina Koskela (born 1971), Finnish chessplayer
- Niina Ning Zhang, Chinese linguist
- Niina Mäkinen (born 1992), Finnish ice hockey forward
- Niina Malm (born 1982), Finnish politician
- Niina Petrõkina (born 2004), Estonian figure skater
- Niina Sarias (born 1984), Finnish snowboarder

== See also ==
- Ayano Niina (born 1988), stage name of the Japanese voice actress
