= Alessandro Capone =

Alessandro Capone may refer to:

- Alessandro Capone (director)
- Alessandro Capone (linguist)
