= Nariakira =

- Gender: Male

Origin
- Origin: Japanese
- Meaning: Different meanings depending on the kanji used

Nariakira (written: 斉彬, 成章) is a masculine Japanese given name. Notable people with the name include:

- Arisaka Nariakira (有坂 成章) (1852–1915), Japanese general
- Fujitani Nariakira (富士谷 成章) (1738–1779), Japanese academic and linguist
- Shimazu Nariakira (島津 斉彬) (1809–1858), Japanese daimyō
