= Reinhard Hartmann =

Austrian-born English linguist (1938–2024)

Reinhard Hartmann FRS
- Born: 8 April 1938; Vienna, Austria
- Died: 12 September 2024 (aged 86); Exeter, United Kingdom
- Spouse: Lynn Warren (m. 1964)

Academic background
- Education: Southern Illinois University

Academic work
- Discipline: Lexicography; applied linguistics
- Institutions: University of Manchester Institute of Science and Technology; University of Nottingham; University of Exeter

Reinhard Rudolf Karl Hartmann FRS (8 April 1938 – 12 September 2024) was an Austrian-born English lexicographer and applied linguist. Until the 1970s, lexicographers worked in relative isolation, and Hartmann was credited with making a major contribution to lexicography and fostering interdisciplinary consultation between reference specialists.

R. R. K. Hartmann was co-author of the standard texts Dictionary of Language and Linguistics (1972) and the Dictionary of Lexicography (1998); the former has been translated into Chinese, the latter into Japanese. Hartmann also produced works on a wide range of linguistic and lexicographic topics (see list of Publications below). Two selections of his essays were published in Kuwait (2004) and Germany (2007).

== Life and career ==
Reinhard Hartmann was born on 8 April 1938 in Vienna, Austria, as the son of Walther and Gerta Hartmann. He obtained a degree at the Vienna University of Economics and Business Administration, where he later wrote a doctoral dissertation on public economy control and auditing. He then studied at the University of Vienna, where he was awarded a diploma in English translation. As a postgraduate student at Southern Illinois University, he received an M.A. in international economics. In 1964, Hartmann moved to Manchester, England where he married Lynn Warren and where their children Nasim and Stefan were born.

Hartmann began his teaching career as a lecturer in modern languages at the University of Manchester Institute of Science and Technology. This was followed in 1968 by his appointment as lecturer in applied linguistics at the University of Nottingham. From 1974 onwards, he held senior posts in the Language Centre and the School of English at the University of Exeter, where he organised a number of influential conferences, such as LEXeter '83. He also edited the LEXeter '83: Proceedings volume which published the conference papers. This conference led to the creation of the European Association of Lexicography (EURALEX), the International Journal of Lexicography, and the book series Lexicographica Series Maior (of which he was a co-editor from 1984 to 2008, during which time 134 volumes were published). From 1983 to 2008, he attended 12 of the 13 biennial Euralex congresses, contributing papers at half of them and acting as first secretary and fourth president.

Hartmann was also involved in the founding of AFRILEX (Johannesburg 1995) and ASIALEX (Hong Kong 1997). Among the conferences he hosted at Exeter included one on the history of lexicography (Hartmann 1986), which demonstrated that lexicographic traditions differ considerably by dictionary types and languages, and one on lexicography in Africa (Hartmann 1990). He served as consultant to a number of bodies, received grants and fellowships to study and lecture abroad, and participated in initiatives to promote the lexicographic discipline. He welcomed visiting scholars who came to Exeter to perform research. Hartmann's achievements were recorded in several international directories, and he was a Fellow of the Royal Society of Arts and of the Chartered Institute of Linguists.

While at Exeter, Hartmann established the Dictionary Research Centre in 1984, supervising over 45 M.A. and 30 Ph.D. dissertations, focusing on such aspects as dictionary criticism (evaluating their many different features), dictionary history (tracing their varying traditions), dictionary typology (classifying their different genres), dictionary use (observing the reference skills needed to access information), contrastive linguistics, translation, and bilingual lexicography.

Upon his retirement from Exeter in September 2001, the Dictionary Research Centre was transferred to the University of Birmingham, where Hartmann was awarded the title of Honorary Professor of Lexicography in the School of English. In 2007, Hartmann embarked on a project to consolidate his various lists of conferences, institutions, dictionary projects, dissertations, and periodicals into an International Directory of Lexicography Institutions.

Hartmann died on 12 September 2024, at the age of 86 after a short illness.

== Publications ==
- Dictionary of Language and Linguistics (1972) comp. by R.R.K. Hartmann & F.C. Stork, London: Applied Science Publishers (Chinese translation Yuyan yu yuyan xue cidian published 1981).
- Dictionaries and Their Users. Papers from the 1978 BAAL Seminar on Lexicography (1979) ed. by R.R.K. Hartmann (Exeter Linguistic Studies Vol. 4), University of Exeter and ITL Review of Applied Linguistics, Catholic University of Leuven.
- Contrastive Textology. Comparative Discourse Analysis in Applied Linguistics (1980) by R.R.K. Hartmann (Studies in Descriptive Linguistics Vol. 5), Heidelberg: Groos.
- Lexicography. Principles and Practice (1983) ed. by R.R.K. Hartmann (Applied Language Studies), London/New York: Academic Press (Japanese translation Jishogaku – sono genri to jissai published 1984; Bahasa Malaysia translation Leksikografi: prinsip dan amalan published 1993).
- LEXeter '83 Proceedings. Papers from the International Conference on Lexicography at Exeter, 9–12 September 1983 (1984) ed. by R.R.K. Hartmann (Lexicographica. Series Maior Vol. 1), Tübingen: M. Niemeyer.
- The History of Lexicography. Papers from the Dictionary Research Centre Seminar at Exeter, March 1986 (1986) ed. by R.R.K. Hartmann (Amsterdam Studies in the Theory and History of Linguistic Science III.40), Amsterdam/Philadelphia: J. Benjamins.
- Lexicography in Africa. Progress Reports from the Dictionary Research Centre Workshop at Exeter 24–25 March 1989 (1990) ed. by R.R.K. Hartmann (Exeter Linguistic Studies Vol. 15), Exeter: University of Exeter Press ISBN 0-85989-345-6.
- Dictionary of Lexicography (1998) comp. by R.R.K. Hartmann & Gregory James, London: Routledge. ISBN 0-415-14143-5 (revised paperback edition 2001 ISBN 0-415-14144-3; Cidianxue cidian paperback reprint in English, with Chinese introduction, published in 2000; Japanese translation Jishogaku jiten published in 2003).
- Dictionaries in Language Learning. Recommendations, National Reports and Thematic Reports from the TNP Sub-Project 9 on Dictionaries (1999) ed. by R.R.K. Hartmann, Berlin: Thematic Network Project in the Area of Languages/European Language Council .
- Teaching and Researching Lexicography (2001) by R.R.K. Hartmann (Applied Linguistics in Action), Harlow: Longman-Pearson Education. ISBN 0-582-36977-0 PPR (Chinese reprint published in 2005).
- Lexicography: Critical Concepts (2003) ed. by R.R.K. Hartmann (Reader, with 70 Chapters by 75 authors arranged in 9 Parts in 3 volumes), London: Routledge/Taylor and Francis. ISBN 0-415-25365-9.
- Al-ma’aajim ‘abra l-thaqaafaat. Dictionaries across Cultures. Studies in Lexicography by R.R.K. Hartmann (2004) (17 published and 4 unpublished essays by R.R.K. Hartmann, selected and translated into Arabic by Mohamed Helmy Heliel), Kuwait: Kuwait Foundation for the Advancement of Science. ISBN 99906-30-70-4.
- Interlingual Lexicography. Selected Essays on Translation Equivalence, Contrastive Linguistics, and the Bilingual Dictionary by R.R.K. Hartmann (2007) (Lexicographica. Series Maior Vol. 133), Tübingen: M. Niemeyer. ISBN 978-3-484-39133-8.

== See also ==
- List of lexicographers
- List of linguists
- Applied linguistics
