= Sorin Stati =

Sorin Stati was a Romanian linguist, born in Bucharest on 1 February 1931, and died in Paris in 2008.

He held for a number of years the chair of linguistics at the University of Bucharest; then, due to a conflict with the official regime, which imposed a brutal control over academics, he moved to Italy where he obtained temporary lectureships at the University of Padova and University of Venice. He then obtained the chair of linguistics at the University of Messina and then migrated to the University of Bologna where he held the chair of linguistics.

Sorin Stati obtained his BA in 1954 in the subject of Classical Philology from the Faculty of Letters, University of Bucharest. He later obtained two doctorates in linguistics: In 1967 he received the doctorate in general linguistics with the thesis: "Théorie et méthode en syntaxe," published in éditions de l’Académie Roumaine; translated into Italian as "Teoria e metodo nella sintassi," Bologna il mulino, 1972. In 1978 he received a doctorate at Sorbonne University with the thesis: "Le système sémantique des adjectifs dans la langue roumaine", published by Jean Fayard (1979).

== Honors ==
He was vice-President of the SILF and President of the IADA (International Association for Dialogue Analysis) until he retired due to old age. In 1993, he was elected to honorary membership in the Romanian Academy of Sciences. He held visiting professorships at the University of Paris (France), Aarhus University (Denmark), Lund University (Sweden), Innsbruck University (Austria), Lugano University (Switzerland).

A Festschrift was published for him in 1997: Dialogue analysis: units, relations and strategies beyond the sentence: contributions in honour of Sorin Stati's 65th birthday ed. by Edda Weigand; Eckhard Hauenherm. Tübingen: Niemeyer, 1997 ISBN 9783484750135.

A memorial volume was published in his honor in 2010: Perspectives on language use and pragmatics : a volume in memory of Sorin Stati ed. Alessandro Capone. Munich: Lincom Europa, 2010 ISBN 9783929075724

== Publications ==
He was author or editor of a number of books in Romanian and Italian, some translated also into Spanish.

It might be of interest to readers that Sorin Stati's paper on pragmatics and argumentation was published in A. Capone, F. Lo PIparo, M. Carapezza, eds. 2013. Perspectives on linguistic pragmatics. Cham, Springer.

=== Books written ===
- 1961 Limba latină în inscripţiile din Dacia şi Sciţia Minor.
- 1963 Dicţionar ceh-român (with Felix, J. et al.).
- 1964 Cuvinte româneşti. O poveste a vorbelor.
- 1966 Introducere în lingvistica matematică (with Marcus, S./Nicolau, E.).
  - Translated into Spanish as Introducción en la lingüística matematica.1978
  - Translated into Italian as Introduzione alla linguistica matematica. 1971
- 1967 Teorie şi metodă în sintaxă.
- 1967 Călătorie lingvistică în ţara muzelor.
  - Translated into Italian as Teoria e metodo nella sintassi. 1972
- 1968 Limbaj, logică, filozofie (with Marcus, S./Popa, C./Enescu, G./Boboc, A.).
- 1970 Analize sintactice şi stilistice (with Bulgăr, G.).
- 1971 Interferenţe lingvistice.
- 1971 Tratat de lingvistică generală (with Graur, A./Wald, L.).
- 1972 Elemente de analiză sintactică.
- 1972 Educaţie şi limbaj.
- 1973 Douăzeci de scrisori despre limbaj.
- 1974 Il significato della parole.
- 1974 Dizionario italiano-romeno e romeno-italiano (with Stati, Y.).
- 1976 La sintassi.
  - Translated into Spanish as La sintaxis, 1979
- 1977 Teorie sintattiche del Novecento.
- 1978 Manuale di semantica descrittiva.
- 1979 La sémantique des adjectifs en langues romanes.
- 1982 Il dialogo, Considerazioni di linguistica pragmatica.
- 1986 Cinque miti della parola. Lezioni di lessicologia testuale.
- 1990 Le transphrastique.
- 2002 Principi di analisi argomentativa, Pàtron.

=== Books edited ===
- 1985 Editor (with Ducos, G.) of: Actes du XI Colloque de linguistique fonctionnelle, Bologne 1984.
- 1992 (with Hundsnurscher, F., Weigand, E.) of: Dialoganalyse III. Referate der 3. Arbeitstagung Bologna 1990, 2 vol.
- 1993 (with Weigand, E.) of: Methodologie der Dialoganalyse.
