= Tsutomu Miura =

Japanese linguist

Tsutomu Miura (三浦 つとむ, Miura Tsutomu; 1911 - October 27, 1989) was a Japanese linguist born in Tokyo.

He studied language as expression from contentism and criticized formism and functionism, like structural linguistics or the theory of generative grammar.

He regarded Tokieda's theory, also known as "Gengo Katei Setsu"(Language-as-a-Process Theory), as "the world highest standard theory" and created his original language theory based on Tokieda's theory.

== Bibliography ==
He wrote more than thirty books. But none of Miura's book have been translated to English yet.

- Miura (1948). The Introduction to Philosophy (哲学入門 Tetsugaku Nyuumon).
- Miura (1955). What is Dialectics as Science (弁証法はどういう科学か Benshouhou wa Douiu Kagaku ka).
- Miura (1956). What is Japanese Language (日本語はどういう言語か Nihongo wa Douiu Gengo ka).
- Miura (1967). The Theory of Cognition and Language (認識と言語の理論 Ninshiki to Gengo no Riron).
- Miura (1970). The Theory of Cognition and Art (認識と芸術の理論 Ninshiki to Geijutsu no Riron).
- Miura (1975). The Japanese Grammar (日本語の文法 Nihongo no Bunpou).
- Miura (1983). Tsutomu Miura's Selection (三浦つとむ選集 Miura Tsutomu Sensyuu).
