= Emmon Bach =

American linguist

Emmon Bach Professor Emeritus
- Born: 12 June 1929; Kumamoto, Japan
- Died: 28 November 2014 (aged 85); Oxford, England
- Occupation: Linguist
- Spouses: Jean Bach; Reed Young; Barbara Partee; Wynn Chao
- Children: 2

Academic background
- Education: University of Chicago
- Thesis: Patterns of Syntax in Hoelderlin’s Poems (1959)

Academic work
- Institutions: University of Massachusetts Amherst
- Website: Faculty page

Emmon Bach (12 June 1929 – 28 November 2014) was an American linguist. He was Professor Emeritus at the Department of Linguistics, University of Massachusetts, Amherst and Professorial Research Associate at the School of Oriental and African Studies (SOAS), part of the University of London. He was born in Kumamoto, Japan.

His interests included syntax, phonology, the languages of British Columbia (especially Haisla), problems of tense and aspect in semantics, and formal problems and semantic issues in the morphology of polysynthetic languages. In November 2014, he died in Oxford.

== Early years ==
Bach's parents, Ditlev Gotthard Monrad Bach and Ellen Sigrid Bach - originally from Copenhagen, Denmark - were Lutheran missionaries in Japan. Bach – and all but the oldest of his five siblings – was born in Kumamoto on the island of Kyushu. Since his father taught Japanese to the American Navy language officers during the World War II, they were considered to be American nationals, and received warnings to leave Japan in 1941. As a child Bach spoke Danish and some Japanese. When he was ten, Bach was sent to the International Canadian Academy in Kobe. In Fresno, California his father was a "pastor to Japanese-Americans interned during the war." Bach attended Boulder High School in Boulder, Colorado and Roosevelt High School in Fresno, CA.

== Education ==
He "did his undergraduate and graduate work at the University of Chicago, with a Ph.D. in Germanic studies in 1959." He was a Fulbright scholar at the University of Tübingen from 1955 to 1956.

== Academic career ==
His first regular academic job was at the University of Texas at Austin where he taught from 1959 to 1972. He started in the German department and gradually switched to linguistics. He was part of the newly formed linguistics department. After spending a year teaching at Queens College and the Graduate Center of the City University of New York, he began teaching as professor of linguistics at the University of Massachusetts Amherst in 1973. "He taught syntax, semantics, typology and field methods, and supervised 12 doctorate dissertations in semantics, syntax and phonology." Following his retirement in 1992, he continued to be active in academia.

Emmon's numerous publications included reviews, articles and books on "syntax, phonology, morphology and semantics, including on problems of tense and aspect in semantics, and on formal problems and semantic issues in the morphology of polysynthetic languages."

During the 1980s and 1990s Bach worked extensively in British Columbia. From 1994 to 1999 he worked as a visiting professor with the First Nations Programme of the University of Northern British Columbia where he went to local First Nations communities to teach and co-teach primarily for First Nations students. He also worked as a language resource for the Haisla Treaty Commission. By 2003 Bach had already nurtured "longtime involvement with the Haisla language community in the coastal village of Kitimaat in British Columbia. His work with the Haisla has included preparation of a new dictionary and two volumes of traditional stories and life stories; transcription of biblical and homiletic materials produced by Christian missionaries in the 1940s; and the creation of an extensive archive of linguistic work on Haisla." When he first arrived in Kitimaat, Mike Shaw, a Haisla speaker, asked "Why should we help you, what good will all that do for us?" "From this exchange Bach formulated what he has come to call Mike Shaw's Principle: Time and resources for community-relevant research and activities should equal those devoted to community-external aims."

== Associations ==
Bach was elected president of the Linguistic Society of America (LSA) in 1996. In 2006, he was inducted as a Fellow of the Linguistic Society of America. In 2015, the LSA created the Emmon Bach Fellowship fund, which provides awards for students to cover costs of participation in the biannual Institute on Collaborative Language Research (CoLang).

== Personal life ==
Both his first wife, Jean Bach, and his daughter, Meta Bach, predeceased him. He is survived by his wife Wynn Chao of London, his son Eric Bach and grandson Stevie Bach of Madison, his stepsons Morriss, David, and Joel Partee, his stepchildren Christopher and Gabriella Lewis, step grandchildren Sean Partee, Sara Davis, and Rachael Davis Partee, his second wife Reed Young of Houston, and his third wife Barbara Partee of Amherst. He moved to London, England in 2002.

== Selected publications ==
- Bach, Emmon (1964). An Introduction to Transformational Grammars. New York.
- Bach, Emmon (1974). Syntactic Theory. New York. ISBN 9780030767159.
- Bach, Emmon (1989). Informal Lectures on Formal Semantics. Albany.

== See also ==
- List of linguists
- Linguistic Society of America
