= Robert Bauer (linguist) =

Honorary linguistics professor at the University of Hong Kong

Robert Stuart Bauer
- Born: 1946 (age 79–80)
- Citizenship: Hong Kong SAR
- Education: University of California, Berkeley
- Known for: Documenting Cantonese, including a Cantonese-English dictionary
- Scientific career
- Fields: Linguistics
- Workplaces: University of Hong Kong; Hong Kong Polytechnic University

Robert S. Bauer
- Chinese: 包睿舜
Transcriptions
Standard Mandarin
- Hanyu Pinyin: Bāo Ruì Shùn
- Wade–Giles: Pao Jui Shun
- Tongyong Pinyin: Bao Ruei Shun
Yue: Cantonese
- Yale Romanization: Bāau Yeuih Seun
- Jyutping: Baau1 Jeoi6 Seon3
- Sidney Lau: Baau1 Yui6 Sun3
- Canton Romanization: Bao1 Yêu6 Sên3
- Hong Kong Romanisation: Bau Yui Shun

Robert Stuart Bauer (name in Chinese: 包睿舜; Jyutping: Baau1 Jeoi6seon3, born 1946) is the honorary linguistics professor at the University of Hong Kong and formerly professor of Chinese linguistics at the Hong Kong Polytechnic University. He began his study of Cantonese in Taiwan from the United States in 1974 while he was learning Mandarin, then he continued his studies as an exchange student at the Chinese University of Hong Kong in 1970s. Bauer later received his Ph.D. degree in linguistics from the University of California, Berkeley in 1982 and has taught linguistics at universities in Australia, China, Hong Kong, Japan, Taiwan, and Thailand. In 1997, he relocated to Hong Kong permanently, just before the city's handover from British to Chinese sovereignty.

He is also the co-author of a number of Cantonese related linguistic publications, including Modern Cantonese Phonology, The Representation of Cantonese with Chinese Characters,,"ABC Cantonese-English Comprehensive Dictionary (published in December 31, 2020)" etc. Apart from his research in Cantonese, he is also interested in other Yue dialects, the Thai language, and contact relationships among Chinese, Thai, Vietnamese, and minority languages of China and Southeast Asia.

== See also ==
- List of linguists
