= DT-Manie =

Set of rules that addresses a problem in the correct spelling of Dutch

DT-Manie is a set of rules that addresses a problem in the correct spelling of Dutch.

== Background ==
Dutch writers face a problem in determining the correct verb endings. Should they write ‘d’, ‘dd’, ‘t’, ‘tt’ or ‘dt’? This cannot be made out by the sound of the spoken word; antwoord and antwoordt sound the same, and so do antwoorden and antwoordden. This caused numerous problems in schools and when writing official correspondence, for instance job applications, owing to the bad impression made by failure to apply the correct spelling.

As can be seen in these examples, the endings of these Dutch verbs alter according to the tense, person, number etc., and it was this rule that gave rise to spelling difficulties for children and adults alike as 'd', 'dt', and 't' in final positions are all pronounced as /t/.

1. ik antwoord (I answer),
2. jij antwoordt (you answer),
3. antwoord jij? (answer you = do you answer?),
4. hij/zij antwoordt (he/she answers),
5. ik/jij/hij heb/heeft geantwoord (I / you / he have / has answered),
6. ik/jij/hij antwoordde (I / you / he answered; ⟨dd⟩ pronounced as /d/),
7. antwoord! (answer!),
8. antwoordt! (answer! said to more than one person - archaic),
9. antwoorden (to answer; ⟨d⟩ pronounced as /d/),
10. de beantwoorde vraag (the answered question; ⟨d⟩ pronounced as /d/).
11. The situation was further complicated in the archaic language:
  - gij hadt geantwoord (thou hadst answered; gij is now mostly used regionally or in biblical language)
  - dat hij antwoorde! (that he may answer; the subjunctive is now usually restricted to set idioms)

== Solution ==
A solution was found in the Department of Linguistics at K.U.Leuven, in 1991 by Jeannine Beeken. She developed a minimal set of rules giving the enquirer the opportunity to answer only a few questions to identify the correct ending. As a visualised algorithm, DT-Manie always gives the user the correct answer, as long as all of the yes/no-questions are answered correctly. It gives all the correct spellings for each Dutch verb for all moods, tenses, persons and numbers. It presents a simple solution for the most notorious spelling problem in Dutch, i.e. how to spell verbs ending in /t/, which is also known as the ‘DT rule’.

DT-Manie Booklet p.3. 1992.

== Media interest ==
A leaflet called ‘DT Mania’ was printed for more than 100,000 Flemish secondary-school pupils. When the spelling algorithm was announced in the 8 o’clock news, however, thousands of people phoned in to obtain one or more copies of the leaflet, resulting in a breakdown of the phone system in the whole city of Leuven. Because the hospitals, fire brigade and police etc. could no longer be reached by phone, a special news edition was broadcast later that evening, asking people to dial two phone numbers only, which had been specially set up for the occasion. During the first week of its appearance, more than half a million copies were posted free of charge.

== Bibliography ==
- BEEKEN, J. (1990, 1991) DT-Manie: een spellingsalgoritme voor werkwoordsvormen (DT-Manie: a spelling algorithm for forms of verbs), 14/11, Eekhoutcentrum Kortrijk.
- BEEKEN, J. & D. SPEELMAN (1995) DT-Manie 1.0 (software), Wolters, Leuven.
- DRIESSENS, Koen. (1992) 'Het is beter de regels te kennen dan ze te wijzigen', Het Belang Van Limburg, 8 Mei, p. 43.
- D, W. (1992) 'Handig vouwblaadje moet dt-fouten uitroeien De theedrinker leest DT-manie', Het Volk/DNG, p. 7.
- S.(1992) 'DT-Manie', Klasse. No.25 Mei, p. 34.
