= Rita Manzini =

Linguist

Maria Rita Manzini is Professor of Linguistics at the University of Florence. She is known for her work on syntax, syntactic variation, principles and parameters, the Romance languages, and the languages of the Balkans.

== Biography ==
Manzini studied at the University of Pisa and the Scuola Normale Superiore di Pisa, writing her thesis (1979) on control and the generative syntax of Italian. In 1983 she completed a PhD at MIT, advised by Noam Chomsky, with a dissertation titled, Restructuring and Reanalysis.

After a brief period as postdoctoral fellow at the University of California, Irvine, she took up a position as Lecturer at University College London, first in the department of Italian (1984–90) then in the department of linguistics and phonetics. In 1992 she was appointed to an associate professorship at the University of Florence, and in 2000 she was promoted to full professor there.

Manzini has held visiting positions at UCLA, SOAS, the University of Oxford, the University of Girona, the University of Modena and Reggio Emilia, Georgetown University, Université Côte d'Azur, and the University of Brasília.

== Honors ==
In 2018 she was elected as a member of the Academia Europaea.

A Festschrift in her honor, entitled Linguistic Variation: Structure and Interpretation, was published by Mouton in 2020.

== Research ==
Manzini’s research falls under the umbrella of generative syntax. Her early work focused particularly on the theory of non-finite complementation and control. In the 1980s she published a number of works on parameter setting, and in 1992 an influential monograph on locality. With her Florence colleague Leonardo Maria Savoia she is also responsible for I dialetti italiani e romanci (Italian and Romance dialects, 2005), a multi-volume descriptive grammar of Italian dialects couched in the generative framework. The empirical basis for her theoretical work has mostly been Romance languages, but Albanian has also played a major role.

== Selected publications ==
- Manzini, M. Rita. 1983. Restructuring and reanalysis. PhD dissertation, MIT.
- Manzini, M. Rita. 1983. On control and control theory. Linguistic Inquiry 3 (1), 421-446.
- Manzini, M. Rita, and Kenneth Wexler. 1987. Parameters, binding theory, and learnability. Linguistic Inquiry 7 (1), 413-444.
- Wexler, Kenneth, and M. Rita Manzini. 1987. Parameters and learnability in binding theory. In Thomas Roeper and Edwin Williams (eds.), Parameter setting, 41-76. Dordrecht: Springer. ISBN 9789400937277
- Manzini, M. Rita. 1992. Locality: a theory and some of its empirical consequences. Cambridge, MA: MIT Press. ISBN 9780262132794
- Manzini, M. Rita, and Anna Roussou. 2000. A minimalist theory of A-movement and control. Lingua 110 (6), 409-447.
- Manzini, M. Rita, and Leonardo M. Savoia. 2005. I dialetti italiani e romanci. 3 vols. Florence: Edizioni dell'Orso. ISBN 887694835X
- Manzini, M. Rita, and Leonardo M. Savoia. 2011. Grammatical categories: variation in Romance languages. Cambridge: Cambridge University Press. ISBN 9780521765190
