= Annick De Houwer =

Belgian linguist

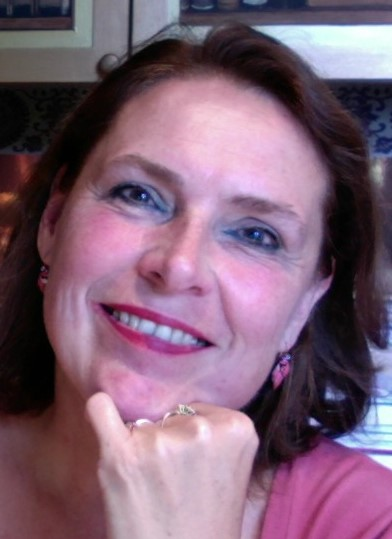
- Born: 3 January 1958 (age 68); Schoten, Belgium
- Occupations: Linguist, academic, researcher and author
- Awards: Fulbright award VNC-award; President of the International Association for the Study of Child Language

Academic background
- Education: BA, Germanic philology MA, General and English Linguistics; Specialization, Psycholinguistics; PhD, Linguistics
- Alma mater: Free University of Brussels

Annick De Houwer (born 3 January 1958) is a Belgian linguist, academic, researcher and author. She is the Initiator and Director of the Harmonious Bilingualism Network (HaBilNet).

De Houwer's research has focused on early child bilingualism and the role of input in bilingual acquisition and on bilingual families' well-being. She has authored the books Bilingual Development in Childhood; Bilingual First Language Acquisition; An Introduction to Bilingual Development; and The Acquisition of Two Languages from Birth: a Case Study. She was co-series editor of Trends in Language Acquisition Research and series editor of IMPACT: Studies of Language in Society. She has also co-edited several books, most recently The Cambridge Handbook of Bilingualism (2019). Her writings have been published in Dutch, English, French, German, Portuguese, and Spanish.

De Houwer has been a residential fellow at the Netherlands Institute for Advanced Study (NIAS). She is a member of the TalkBank advisory board at Carnegie Mellon University, and has been a member of the scientific advisory board of MultiLing at the University of Oslo.

== Education ==
De Houwer completed her bachelor's degree in Germanic linguistics and literature in 1977 at the Free University of Brussels, and her MA in general and English linguistics at the University of Antwerp in 1979, where she also received a High School Teaching Certificate. In 1980, she obtained a Certificate of Specialisation in psycholinguistics from the Catholic University of Louvain and studied child language and psycholinguistics at Stanford University from 1980 to 1981. She received her PhD in linguistics from the Free University of Brussels in 1988.

== Career ==
De Houwer began her academic career in 1981, as a part-time Dutch instructor at Stanford University. She was a lecturer for English linguistics from 1981 to 1988 at the Free University of Brussels, after which she became a lecturer for child language until 1989, at the University of Antwerp. From 1991 to 1992, she was an assistant professor for English linguistics at the Free University of Brussels. After that, she held a part-time position at the University of Antwerp, first as an assistant professor for communication Sciences (until 1997), and then as an associate professor (until 2000). Concurrently she held research positions, first as a postdoctoral fellow (1993–1999) and one year as a tenured research scientist (1999–2000). These positions were first with the Belgian National Science Foundation (until 1996) and afterwards with the Research Foundation Flanders (FWO). De Houwer was appointed associate research professor at the University of Antwerp in 2000. She left Antwerp in 2009 to take up a position of professor of linguistics at the University of Erfurt, Germany, from which she retired in 2021.

De Houwer was the director of the Language Center at the University of Erfurt from 2009 to 2012. Since 2018, she has been the initiator and director of the Harmonious Bilingualism Network (HaBilNet). She was elected as president of the International Association for the Study of Child Language (IASCL) in 2021.

De Houwer has been a visiting scholar at Harvard University, Carnegie Mellon University, the State University of New York at Buffalo, and the Netherlands Institute for Advanced Study (NIAS) in Wassenaar. She was a residential fellow at NIAS in 1995, a guest professor at the University of Ghent in 2005, and a visiting research professor at the University of Virginia in 2007. She was collaborative investigator at Child and Family Research, Eunice Shriver Kennedy National Institute of Child Health & Human Development, Bethesda, US, where she worked with Marc H. Bornstein and Diane Putnick Leach.

== Research ==
De Houwer's research engages several sub-fields of linguistics, including developmental psycholinguistics, contact linguistics, sociolinguistics, and second language acquisition. She is well-recognized for her wide-ranging research on bilingual children's language development, and has directed large longitudinal research projects on English-Dutch, Dutch-French, English-German, and German-Polish bilingual children. Her research has been supported by the Belgian National Science Foundation, the National Institutes of Health in the US, the Flemish National Science Foundation, the Special Research Fund of the University of Antwerp, the University of Erfurt, and the Harmonious Bilingualism Network.

=== Bilingual acquisition ===
De Houwer leads ongoing research on bilingual families' well-being and on the role of input in bilingual acquisition. Her 1990 book The Acquisition of Two Languages from Birth: A Case Study constituted pioneering work in bilingual acquisition. Joseph Kess is of the view that "De Houwer's contribution performs two important services. For the specialist, its obvious value is found in the careful presentation of 8 months of longitudinal data from a bilingual Dutch-English subject at a critical age, and its strong support for the separate development hypothesis. But for the nonspecialist, its value must also lie in its careful sifting of reports from bilingual first language acquisition studies." In a later book entitled Bilingual First Language Acquisition, De Houwer explained how bilingually raised children learn to understand and use sounds, words and sentences in two languages. In her review Virginia Yip wrote that the book offers "an authoritative compliment to the plethora of more specialized introductory research textbooks available." and is based on "critical aspects of single- and mixed-methods research in a reasonably comprehensive, user-friendly style…." Imme Kuchenbrandt describes De Houwer's book as based on a "wide range of subfields in the study of bilingualism, including research methods, the acquisition of grammatical phenomena, neurological studies on language processing and word recognition as well as issues of bilingual socialization." Through the description of the development of four fictional children, her second book from 2009 entitled An Introduction to Bilingual Development "illustrates that differences in input, as well as differences in cues provided by parents and other caregivers to speak one or both languages, strongly affect the child’s use of the two languages". In 2021 De Houwer published her fourth book on bilingual development, Bilingual Development in Childhood, which contributes to "the systematic illustration and clarification of concepts and phenomena of early bilingualism" and also describes the ways to "support early bilingual development at different stages in early childhood." It was described by Angélique M. Blackburn as a work which addresses "child development through a social justice approach" and also highlights "the aspects of development that are exclusive to bilinguals, for example language choice and uneven development of two languages."

=== Monolingual children's language development ===
De Houwer's research has also focused on monolingual children's language development. Her research addresses not only linguistic aspects of language development, but also socio-psychological and methodological aspects. In addition she has studied standard-dialect variation, teen language, and adults' attitudes towards child language. Amongst others, her work with Marc H. Bornstein has emphasized the stability and continuity of (monolingual) child vocabulary across the second year. It has also advocated for the use of multiple raters to assess young children's vocabulary.

In 2014, De Houwer and colleagues published a bilingual–monolingual comparison of young children's vocabulary size, and highlighted that if individual bilingual children appear to be slow in early vocabulary development, reasons other than their bilingualism should be investigated. In other work De Houwer determined the absolute frequency of maternal input to bilingual and monolingual children, and showed that the actual amount of maternal language input received by young bilingual versus matched monolingual children was similar. In another study, she presented survey data on the home language use of over 18,000 families with young children living throughout Flanders, which is officially monolingual Dutch-speaking. The results of the survey indicated that nearly one family in 8 uses another language besides Dutch at home, either in addition to Dutch, or excluding Dutch.

De Houwer has also been engaged in collaborative research on intra-linguistic subtitling in Dutch-speaking television programs.

Since 1989, De Houwer has been a member of CHILDES and was one of the first to contribute a bilingual child language corpus. As of 2022, she contributed three additional corpora (with Marc H. Bornstein), another bilingual corpus as well as a monolingual Dutch corpus focusing on toddlers, plus a single-authored monolingual corpus focusing on Dutch-speaking children in Antwerp.

== Awards/honors ==
- 1980 – Fulbright-Hayes award, Stanford University, USA
- 1985 – British Council Travel Grant
- 1995 – VNC-award (Vlaams Nederlands Comité) together with Dr. Pieter Muysken, in support of a year at NIAS
- 1995 – Residential Fellow, Netherlands Institute for Advanced Study (NIAS)
- 2009 – Inclusion of A. De Houwer's biography, Marquis Who's Who in the World
- 2021 – President, International Association for the Study of Child Language (IASCL)

== Bibliography ==
=== Books ===
- The Acquisition of Two Languages from Birth: A Case Study. Cambridge, UK: Cambridge University Press (1990) ISBN 9780521366526
- Bilingual First Language Acquisition. Bristol, UK: Multilingual Matters (2009) ISBN 9781847691507
- An Introduction to Bilingual Development. Bristol, UK: Multilingual Matters (2009) ISBN 9781847691705
- Bilingual Development in Childhood. Book in the series Elements in Child Development Cambridge, UK: Cambridge University Press (2021) ISBN 9781108791397

=== Selected articles and chapters ===
- De Houwer, A. (1999). Environmental factors in early bilingual development: The role of parental beliefs and attitudes. Bilingualism and migration, 1999, 75–96.
- De Houwer, A. (2007). Parental language input patterns and children's bilingual use. Applied Psycholinguistics, 28(3), 411–424.
- De Houwer, A., Bornstein, M. H., & Putnick, D. L. (2014). A bilingual–monolingual comparison of young children's vocabulary size: Evidence from comprehension and production. Applied Psycholinguistics, 35(6), 1189–1211.
- De Houwer, A. (2015). Harmonious bilingual development: Young families’ well-being in language contact situations. International Journal of Bilingualism, 19(2), 169–184.
- De Houwer, A. (2017). Minority language parenting in Europe and children's well-being. In N. Cabrera & B. Leyendecker (Eds.), Handbook on Positive Development of Minority Children and Youth, Berlin, Germany: Springer, 231–246.
