= Dmitri Rudolf Peacock =

Dmitri Rudolf Peacock (26 September 1842, Russian Empire – 23 May 1892) was a philologist, diplomat and explorer of the Caucasus.

== Life ==
Peacock was born on 26 September 1842 in the village of Shakhmanovka, district of Kozlov, in the government of Tambov, Russian Empire. He was the son of Charles Peacock, estate manager, and his wife Concordia née Schlegel. He was educated at a school in England, and afterwards at the University of Moscow.

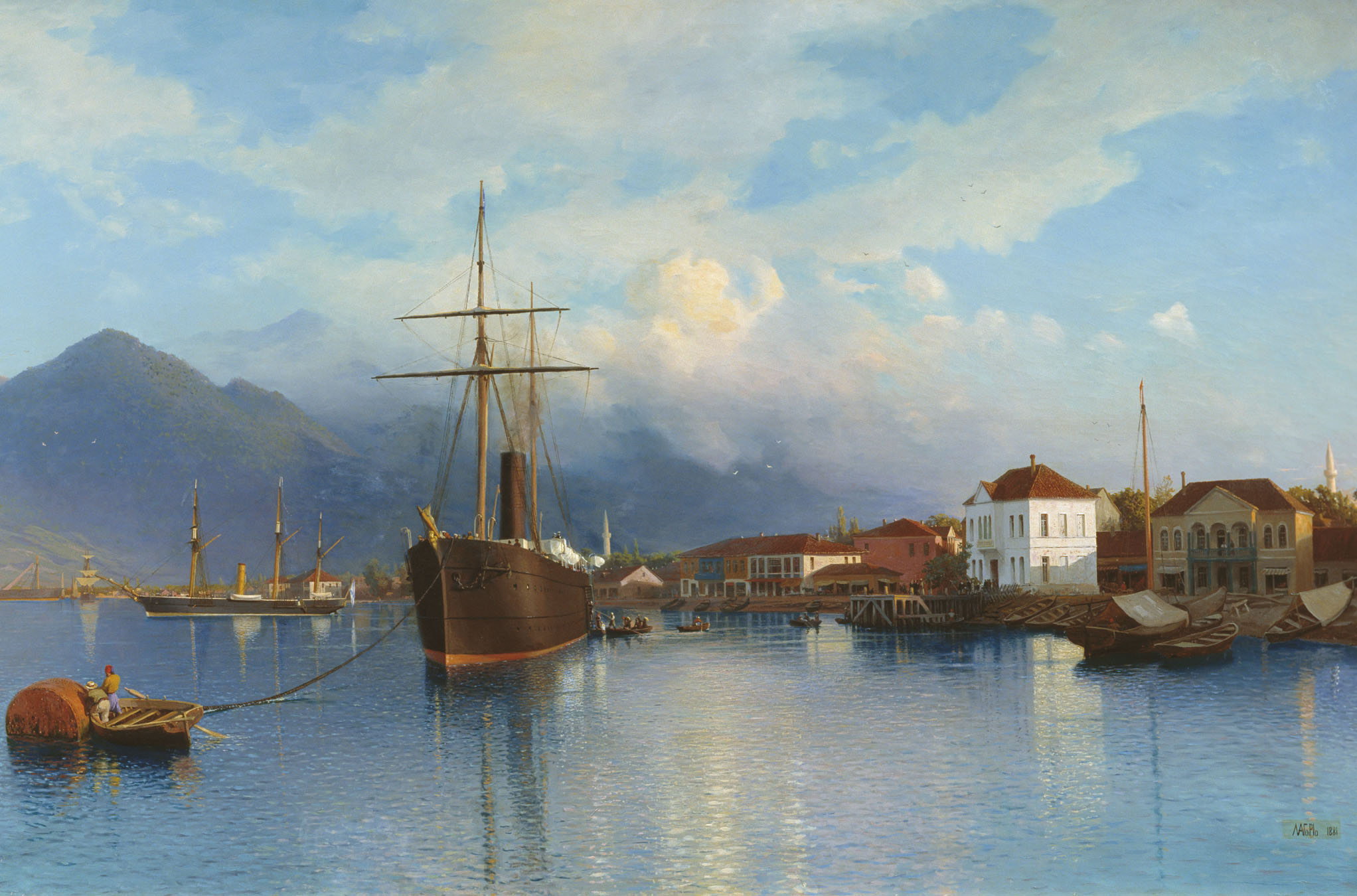
Batumi (1881) by Lev Feliksovich Lagorio

On 25 October 1881 he was appointed vice-consul at Batumi, which had become important in consequence of its annexation by Russia. He became consul on 27 January 1890. He is said to have owed his appointments to his familiarity with the Russian language.

He was well acquainted with the languages and customs of the inhabitants in the mountains of the Caucasus, among whom he had established such friendly relations that he was admitted into their most remote fastnesses. One of the fruits of these expeditions was the publication of original vocabularies of five west Caucasian languages: Georgian, Mingrelian, and the Laz, Svan, and Apkhaz languages. Up to that time no contribution on these languages had appeared in English.

On 14 October 1891, Peacock was appointed consul-general at Odessa, but had only been in residence a few weeks when he died there, on 23 May 1892; it was supposed that he died of Caucasian fever, the marshes which surrounded Batumi rendering the town very unhealthy. He was buried in the British cemetery in Odessa. He left a widow, Tatiana née Bakunin, and three sons and three daughters.

Peacock left little by which the world can form a judgment of his abilities. According to the Levantine Herald, as quoted by The Athenaeum, he wrote a book on the Caucasus which was not approved by the Foreign Office; his widow promised to publish it, but it is not known whether it appeared.

== Literature ==
Kikvidze, Zaal & Pachulia, Levan. 2018. An early landmark in the history of English-Megrelian lexicography: D. R. Peacock's contribution. 8th International Research Conference on Education, Language and Literature. Proceedings Book. Tbilisi: IBSU; pp. 490–496.

Attribution

- This article incorporates text from a publication now in the public domain: Morfill, William Richard (1895). "Peacock, Dmitri Rudolf". In Lee, Sidney (ed.). Dictionary of National Biography. Vol. 44. London: Smith, Elder & Co. p. 137–138.
