= Oladele Awobuluyi =

Nigerian linguist and academic (1937–2026)

- Born: 17 July 1937; Okeagbe, Colony and Protectorate of Nigeria
- Died: 5 August 2026 (aged 89)

Academic background
- Education: University of Colorado Boulder (BA); Columbia University (MA, PhD)
- Thesis: Studies in the Syntax of the Standard Yoruba Verb (1967)

Academic work
- Discipline: Linguist
- Sub-discipline: African linguistics
- Institutions: University of Ilorin; Adekunle Ajasin University

Oladele Awobuluyi (17 July 1937 – 5 August 2026) was a Nigerian linguist, professor, and author. He was born in Okeagbe, Akoko North-West, Ondo State, Colony and Protectorate of Nigeria on 17 July 1937. Awobuluyi's area of research focus was African languages, in particular Yoruba, as well as Kanuri and Edo. Awobuluyi founded the Department of Linguistics and Nigerian Languages at the University of Ilorin in 1976, and served as the department's first head from 1979 until September 1984. He was a fellow of the Nigerian Academy of Letters.

Awobuluyi died on 5 August 2026, at the age of 89. Following his death, tributes were paid to him for his contributions to Yoruba linguistics, African language scholarship and higher education in Nigeria. Adekunle Ajasin University, where he served as acting vice-chancellor from 19 June 2009 to 3 January 2010, also acknowledged his death and his contributions to the university.

== Education and teaching ==
Awobuluyi earned a B.A. in classics at the University of Colorado Boulder in 1961, an M.A. in Latin from Columbia University in 1962, an M.A. in linguistics from Columbia University in 1964, and his Ph.D. in linguistics from Columbia University in 1967. Awobuluyi has taught at Michigan State University, CUNY, University of Lagos, University of Ilorin, and Adekunle Ajasin University.

== Selected publications ==
=== Books ===
- Essentials of Yoruba Grammar
- Yoruba Metalanguage: a Glossary of English-Yoruba Technical Terms in Language, Literature and Methodology
- Studies in the syntax of the standard Yoruba verb by Oladele Awobuluyi
- The New National Policy on Education in Linguistic Perspective
- Ìléwó ìkòwé Yorùbá òde-òní
- Peace Corps Yoruba Course
- Studies in the Syntax of the Standard Yoruba Verb
- Yorùbá kò gbọdọ̀ kú
- Linguistics and Nation Building: the Prof. Emeritus Ayọ Bamgbose Personality Lecture

=== Articles ===
- "On the Reality of Vowel Coalescence in Yoruba", Studies in African Linguistics, December 1985, Vol.9(Dec), pp. 11–14
- "Issues in the Syntax of Standard Yoruba Focus Constructions", The Journal of West African Languages, 1 November 1992, Vol.22(2), p. 69
- "Towards a Typology of Coalescence", The Journal of West African Languages, November 1987, Vol.17(2), pp. 5–22
- "On 'The Subject Concord Prefix', in Yoruba", Studies in African Linguistics, 1 December 1975, Vol.6(3), p. 215
- "The Modifying Serial Construction: a Critique", Studies in African Linguistics, 1 March 1973, Vol.4(1), p. 87
- "On the Status of Prepositions", The Journal of West African Languages, 1 July 1971, Vol.8(2), p. 101
- "'High-Tone-Junction-Contracting Verbs' in Yoruba", The Journal of West African Languages, 1 January 1970, Vol.7(1), p. 29
- "The Particle If in Yoruba", The Journal of West African Languages, 1 July 1969, Vol.6(2), p. 67

=== Tributes ===
- Issues in Contemporary African Linguistics: a Festschrift for Ọladele Awobuluyi
- New Findings in the Study of Nigerian Languages and Literatures: a Festschrift in Honour of Oladele Awobuluyi
- Current Research in African Linguistics: Papers in Honor of Ọladele Awobuluyi
