= Louise Odin =

Swiss linguist (1836–1909)

Louise Odin (1836–1909), was a Swiss linguist, dialect researcher and author of a glossary detailing the dialect of her native village of Blonay, Switzerland. The local dialect was already declining in use when she began her work.

== Biography ==
Susanne Louise Sophie Pilliod was born on 14 March 1836 in the Vaudois village of Blonay, the daughter of Jean François Pilliod and Marie Antoinette, née Bonjour. Before her marriage, she was a teacher in Germany and Russia. She married André-Martin Odin, a German. When her husband died in 1868, she returned with her two children to her hometown above Lake Geneva, Switzerland.

Odin studied the local dialect of Blonay all her life. For half a century, she wrote down, phonetically, the words and stories of the French Provençal dialect, known as patois. Her large text, Glossaire du patois de Blonay, contained no fewer than 12,000 entries, and there are no less than 500 sayings and phrases, and stories, things from local everyday life, children's sayings, stories of old tales and traces of old superstitions. The Geneva professor Ernest Muret oversaw the linguistic editing of Odin's material, wrote its preface and published her lexicon after her death.

In the 19th century, when Louis Gauchat, a Romansh linguist, was working with others on the large-scale project of the Swiss Romansh dialect dictionary, Glossaire des patois de la Suisse romande, Professor Muret contributed the phonetic skills he learned while working with Odin for years. Odin's writings were particularly valuable for Gauchat's glossary, because in that part of French-speaking Switzerland, the local dialect was already disappearing.

Linguist Ernest Tappolet, author of Glossary of patois in French-speaking Switzerland, praised Odin's dictionary saying it was one of the best works of its kind about a local dialect, and could only be compared with the Jura native François Fridelance's Glossaire de Charmoille.

Louise Odin died in her native Blonay on 19 January 1909.

== Personal life ==
Her son, the Romansh Alfred Odin (1862–1896), also focused his work on the dialects of the Vaudois. He wrote the book Phonologie des patois du canton de Vaud in 1886. Her younger son, Auguste Odin, a mathematician from Lausanne, died in an accident on the Rochers de Naye mountain in 1890.
