= Fujitani Nariakira =

Fujitani Sen'emon Nariakira (富士谷 専右衛門 成章, 1738–1779) was an Edo period scholar of the kokugaku tradition and one of the most eminent scholars of Japanese grammar. He made the first serious attempt in Japan to classify the words of the language according to their grammatical functions.

He analysed Japanese poetic language and did work in periodising Japanese (上つ世・中昔・中頃・近昔・をとつ世・今の世, or "ancient ages", "middle old days", "midd-time", "close old days", "past ages" and "present ages"). He is best known for setting up four "parts of speech" in Japanese based on an analogy with clothing: na (names = nouns, indeclinable), kazashi (hairpins = particles or connectives), yosōi (clothing = verbs), and ayui (binding cords = particles and auxiliary verbs). This division can be found in Kazashi shō (『挿頭抄』, 1767), and corresponds to Itō Tōgai's division into jitsuji (実字), kyoji (虚字), joji (助字) and goji (語辞) as described in Sōko jiketsu (『操觚字訣』).

He later published Ayui shō (『脚結抄』, 1778), where he put emphasis on yosōi and azashi/ayui rather than on na, and describes the system of particles. First he makes a division of particles that can go with nouns and particles that can't. The first group then divides into tagui (属) – sentence-ending particles, and ie (家) – particles "inside" a sentence. The second group divides into tomo (倫) – particles of tense and mood, tsura (隊) – inflexible suffixes, and mi (身) – other particles. Fujitani is describing both kazashi and ayui (together) as "kotoba wo tasukuru mono" (things that help the words). This work includes also the study of katsuyō (conjugation of predicatives). Pointing out the word order and relations of words and sentences is considered one of his greatest contributions to the study of Japanese grammar.

Fujitani's older brother (in law) was another famous kokugaku scholar Minagawa Kien (皆川淇園, 1735–1807), author of 『助字詳解』.

His work was studied during the bakumatsu era by Yasuda Mitsunori (安田光則, 1797–1870), but not fully appreciated until resurrected by the grammarian Yamada Yoshio (1873–1958).
