= Mira Nábělková =

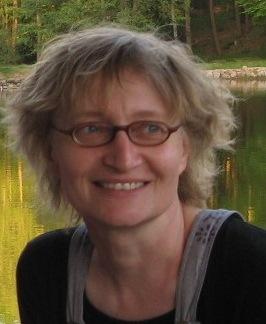
- Mira Nábělková
- Born: 1956 (age 68–69); Martin, Slovakia
- Occupation: linguist

Mira Nábělková (Slovak pronunciation: [ˈmira ˈnaːbɪelkɔʋaː]; born 1956 in Martin, Slovakia) is a Slovak linguist.

In 1975-1980, she studied Slovak and Russian philology at the Faculty of Arts, Comenius University of Bratislava, Slovakia. Since 1980, she worked in the Ľudovít Štúr Institute of Linguistics of the Slovak Academy of Sciences, Bratislava. She defended her PhD dissertation Relational Adjectives in Slovak: Functional-Semantic Analysis of Desubstantive Derivates (in Slovak) in 1989 (published in Bratislava in 1993). In 1991, she co-founded, and until 2000, organised the yearly international Colloquium of Young Linguists (Kolokvium mladých jazykovedcov), a well-known and very popular event for Slovak, Czech and Polish university students of linguistics and young linguists. She edited a number of volumes of Varia, proceedings from the Colloquium.

In 1999, Mira started her teaching career at the Institute of Slavic and East European Studies, Charles University of Prague, Czech Republic, where she has been teaching Slovak linguistics. In 1999-2004, she also taught at the Institute of Slavic Studies, Masaryk University in Brno, Czech Republic. She was awarded Masaryk University Silver Medal for her contribution to the development of Slovak Studies in the Czech Republic.

Mira is working mainly in the fields of lexical semantics, word formation, lexicography, syntax and sociolinguistics. Currently, she deals with Czech-Slovak communication and language contact.

== Family ==
Mira Nábělková was the wife of Karol Ježík (1953-1998), the founder of the SME daily.

== Selected publications ==
- Slovenčina a čeština v kontakte: Pokračovanie príbehu. [Slovak and Czech in Contact: Continuation of the Story]. Bratislava, Praha: Veda, Jazykovedný ústav Ľ. Štúra SAV, Filozofická fakulta Univerzity Karlovy, 2008. 364 pp., ISBN 978-80-224-1060-1
- Closely related languages in contact: Czech, Slovak, "Czechoslovak". International Journal of the Sociology of Language 183, 2007, 53-73.
- Vzťahové adjektíva v slovenčine: Funkčno-sémantická analýza desubstantívnych derivátov. [Relational adjectives in Slovak: Functional-semantic analysis of desubstantive derivates]. Bratislava: Veda, 1993. 204 pp., ISBN 80-224-0352-0
- Horecký, J., Buzássyová, K., Bosák, J. et al. (1989). Dynamika slovnej zásoby súčasnej slovenčiny. [Lexical dynamics in contemporary Slovak]. Bratislava: Veda. 429 pp., ISBN 80-224-0047-5

Mira authored the chapters: Potencie a smery pohybov v adjektívnej lexike [Potentials and directions of the adjectival lexis dynamics] (pp. 169-179); Konkurencia adjektíva a pádu substantíva v prívlastkovej pozícii [Competition between adjectives and substantival cases in the attribute position] (pp. 179-187); Možnosti a spôsoby prekonávania obmedzení adjektívnej derivácie [Possibilities and ways of overcoming restrictions in adjectival derivation] (pp. 187-195); Konkurencia adjektív s domácimi a internacionálnymi formantmi [Competition between the adjectives with Slovak and international formants] (pp. 287-293).
