= Peter Lasersohn =

American linguist and academic

Peter Lasersohn is a professor of linguistics at the University of Illinois at Urbana-Champaign.

== Education ==
- Ph.D. in Linguistics: Ohio State University, 1988
- M.A. in Linguistics: Ohio State University, 1985
- B.A. in German, French: Earlham College, 1981

== Fellowships and honours ==
- Alumni Discretionary-Support Award, University of Illinois, 1999
- Presidential Fellow, Ohio State University, 1987
- LSA Tuition Fellowship, Linguistic Institute, Stanford University, 1987
- LSA Tuition Fellowship, Linguistic Institute, City University of New York, 1986
- Inducted Phi Kappa Phi National Honor Society, Ohio State University, 1984
- University Fellow, Ohio State University 1982
- Arthur Charles Fellow for Language Study, Earlham College, 1981
