= Alessandro Capone (linguist) =

Italian linguist

Alessandro Capone (born 14 August 1965) is an Italian linguist. He is full professor of linguistics at the University of Messina

== Education and career ==
Capone is full professor of linguistics at the University of Messina, Department of Cognitive Science. He obtained his Doctorate in linguistics in 1998 at the University of Oxford with a thesis entitled ‘Modality and Discourse’, supervised by Yan Huang and examined by James Higginbotham and Sally McConnell-Ginet. He published more than 100 papers and authored several monographs on linguistic and philosophical issues, including quotation and reporting, modality, speech acts, explicatures, legal pragmatics, presupposition.

== Editorial and executive work ==
Capone is chief editor of the Springer Science+Business Media book series Perspectives in Pragmatics, Philosophy, Psychology. As of 2018, the series consisted of 20 volumes, 12 of which were authored or co-edited by Capone himself. His edited volumes include various volumes on pragmatics and philosophy (including the proceedings of the Pragmasophia II conference in Palermo), on indirect reports and philosophy and indirect reports and the world languages, pragmatics and law, pragmemes and theories of language use, a volume on the rituals of death and a societal pragmatics volume co-edited with Jacob L. Mey.

He is the TIPP editor of the Thematic Issue: Pragmatics and Philosophy at the journal of Intercultural Pragmatics, and a member of the editorial board of the Journal of Pragmatics, Intercultural Pragmatics, Reti, Saperi, Linguaggi il Mulino - Riviste - and Pragmatics and Society.

Capone co-organized the first and second Pragmasophia international conferences on pragmatics and philosophy, held in Palermo (May 2016) and in Lisbon (September 2018). In collaboration with Pietro Perconti he has also organized Pragmasophia 3, to be held in Noto, Sicily, in July 2020.

Capone has co-organized the third international conference on pragmatics and Philosophy (Noto 17–20 July 2020) Pragmasophia 3:
