= Gülzura Cumakunova =

Kyrgyz linguist

- Гүлзура Жумакунова
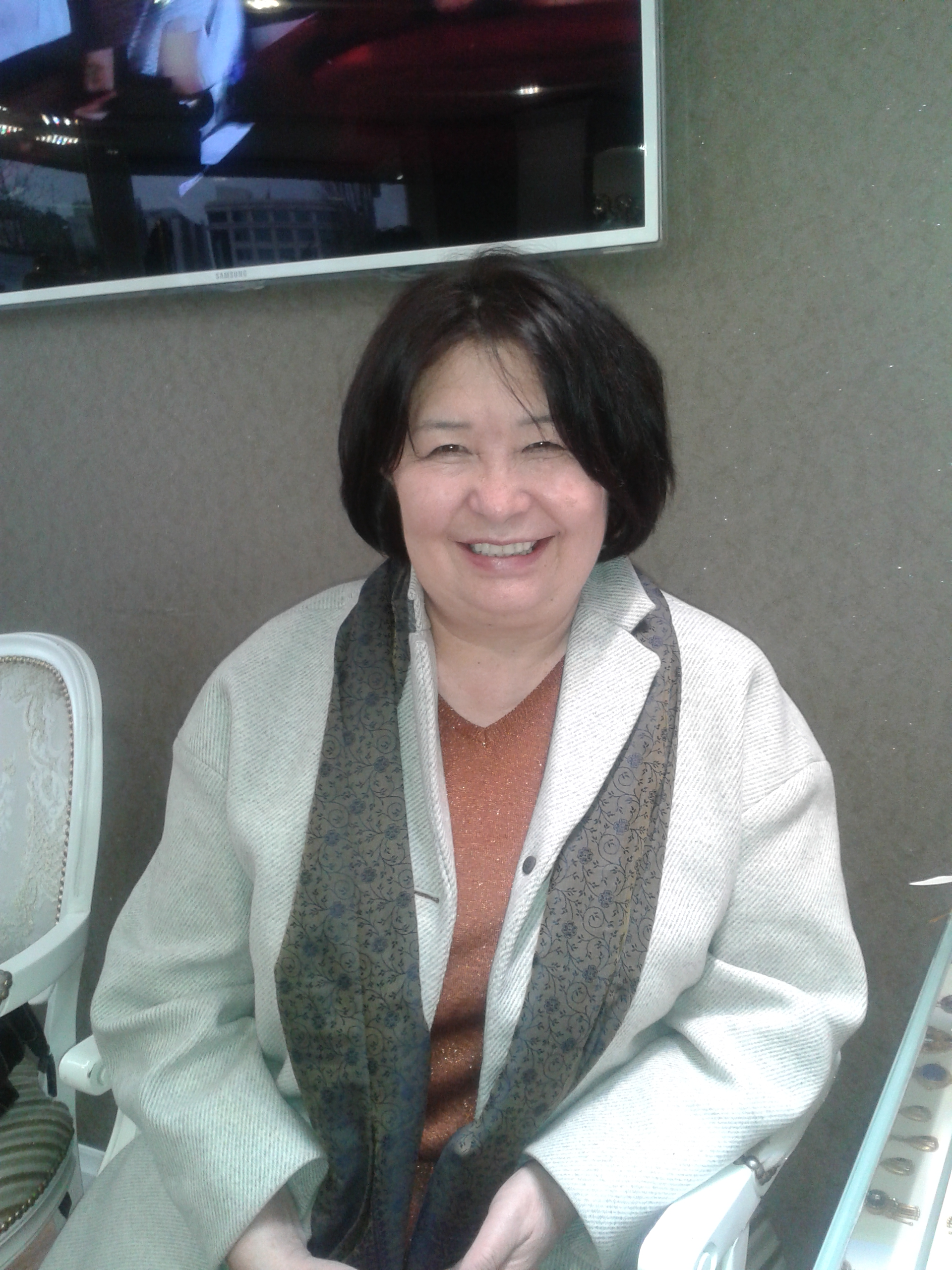
- Gülzura Cumakunova in Ankara. 24.01.2015.
- Born: 30 July 1954 (age 72); Naryn Region, Kyrgyzstan
- Other names: Gülzura Jumakunova, Gülzura Žumakunova
- Education: Kyrgyz National University; Kyrgyz Academy of Sciences; Moscow State University
- Occupation: linguist
- Years active: 1988–present

Gülzura Cumakunova (Kyrgyz: Гүлзура Жумакунова) (born 30 July 1954) is a Kyrgyz linguistic scholar specializing in the dialects of Turkic languages.

== Biography ==
Gülzura Cumakunova was born 30 July 1954 in the Naryn Region of Kyrgyzstan. After graduating from high school in at Bishkek School N° 1, she began university in 1971 at the Kyrgyz National University in the school of philology. She completed her undergraduate work in 1976. Between 1976 and 1984, Cumakunova was the scientific editor at the Kyrgyz-Soviet Encyclopedia Publishing House. She returned to school in 1984, obtaining a master's degree from the Kyrgyz Academy of Sciences and her doctorate from the Institute of Language and Literature in Kyrgyzstan.

Cumakunova began teaching as an assistant professor at the National University in 1988 and then between 1990 and 1991, she completed an internship at the Moscow State University. Upon returning to Kyrgyzstan she was promoted to associate professor in 1992.

In 1993, she joined the staff of the Turkish and Foreign Languages Research and Application Centre in Ankara, Turkey. After a year at the center, Cumakunova took a position in the Turkish Cooperation and Development Agency for the Ministry of Foreign Affairs, working as a foreign relations expert. She taught at Ankara University as a visiting lecturer from 1997 to 2007 and in 2007 she was hired as an associate professor of languages specializing in contemporary Turkic and Turkish dialects. Cumakunova has spoken at conferences in the United States on the lexical parallels between Kyrgyz and Mongolian dialects and at conferences throughout Turkey, Kyrgyzstan, and a conference at Cambridge University in 2011. She presented extensive research on the formation of Turkic languages and alphabets among varying tribal peoples to the Ministry of Culture and Tourism. In 2015, she was awarded the Red Apple Science Award from the Turkish Asian Center for Strategic Studies. The award is given to those who have made significant contributions in deepening socio-economic integration within the Turkish World In 2018, she was awarded the Dank medal of Kyrgyzstan for her contributions to the Kyrgyz language.

== Selected works ==
- Cumakunova, Gülzura (1995). Manas destanı: Kırgız edebî dilinin tarihî kaynağı; Manas destanının 1000. yılına armaăn (in Turkish). Ankara, Turkey: Türk İşbirliği ve Kalkınma Ajansı. ISBN 978-975-7307-22-8.
- Cumakunova, Gülzura (2005). Tu̇rkchȯ-kyrgyzcha sȯzdu̇k: 50.000 sȯz (in Kyrgyz). Bishkek, Kyrgyzstan: KTMU. ISBN 978-9967-22-903-7.
- Cumakunova, Gülzura (2006). Bytovai︠a︡ leksika ėposa "Manas" v sravnitelʹno-istoricheskom osveshchenii (in Russian). Bishkek, Kyrgızistan: Ilim. ISBN 978-9967-23-912-8.
- Cumakunova, Gülzura (2010). "Aĭtmatov atyndagi Til zhana adabii︠a︡t institutu". Tu̇rk leksikografii︠a︡synyn tarykhynan : Tu̇rk sȯzdu̇ktȯru̇ndȯ ilimiĭ print︠s︡ipterdin kalyptanyshy (in Kyrgyz). Bishkek, Kyrgızistan: Ilim. ISBN 978-9967-12-105-8.
