= Pietro Perconti =

Italian philosopher (born 1968)

Pietro Perconti (born September 7, 1968, in Milan) is an Italian philosopher. Currently 'Professor of Philosophy and Theory of Languages' at the Department of Cognitive Sciences, University of Messina.

He has written books and texts on cognition and language (representational symbology). He has tried to define common sense.

Pietro Perconti is full professor of Philosophy of language at the Department of Cognitive Science, University of Messina, Italy.
