= Androula Yiakoumetti =

Cypriot social scientist

Androula Yiakoumetti is a Cypriot dialectologist based at the University of Cambridge. Her research focuses on Greek language and socio-cultural factors that influence language acquisition.

== See also ==
- Bidialectism
