= Jeannine Beeken =

Flemish linguist

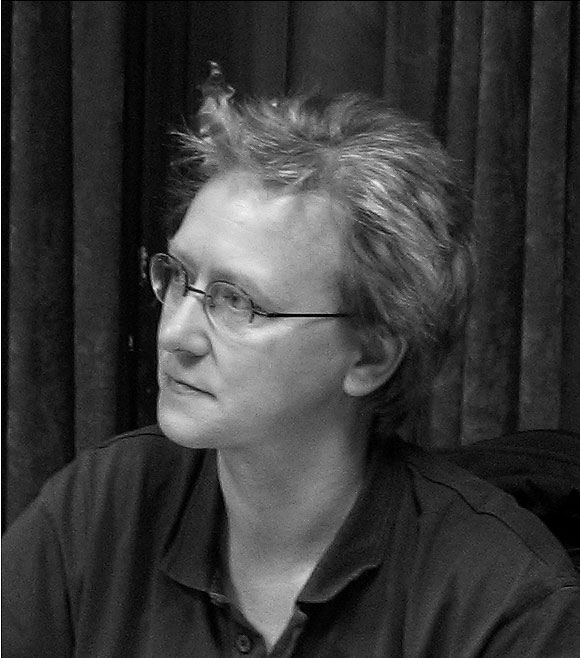
- Jeannine Beeken
- Born: Jeannine Clementine Theodora Beeken; 17 July 1961; Lubbeek, Belgium
- Awards: Award of the Royal Academy for Dutch Linguistics and Literature 1993, Ghent (Koninklijke Academie voor Nederlandse Taal- en Letterkunde) L.K. Engels Award for theoretical linguistics, 1993, Leuven.
- Scientific career
- Fields: Linguistics
- Institutions: K.U.Leuven; Taalunie; INL

Jeannine Clementine Theodora Beeken (born 17 July 1961, Lubbeek, Belgium) is a Flemish linguist. Her work in Dutch linguistics includes amongst others the development of the first academic software teaching platform for Dutch, esp. Dutch syntax, in the late 1980s, the discovery of three additional objects in contemporary Dutch and the rules for the revised Dutch spelling system, Groene Boekje 2005.

== Career ==
Beeken was educated at Heilig-Grafinstituut, Sint-Truiden, Flanders. After leaving Heilig-Grafinstituut in 1979 she entered K.U.Leuven to read Dutch and German linguistics and literature. Reading Dutch linguistics and general linguistics Beeken completed her master's degree in 1983 receiving a magna cum laude for her thesis 'Generalised Phrase Structure Grammar: theorie en praktijk'. Having completed her masters, Beeken was approached to work at K.U.Leuven Department of Linguistics as a research assistant. From 1985 to 1993 Beeken worked as a member of academic staff with Guido Geerts while completing her Doctor of Philosophy under the supervision of Flip G Droste publishing 'Spiegelstructuur en variabiliteit: pre- en postposities in het Nederlands' receiving a summa cum laude and two awards, the Award of the Royal Academy for Dutch Linguistics and Literature, 1993, Ghent, (Koninklijke Academie voor Nederlandse Taal- en Letterkunde) and the L.K. Engels Award for theoretical linguistics, 1993, Leuven.

From 1993, as a K.U.Leuven Research Fellow in Linguistics, Beeken developed a number of software tools and packages for Dutch: CSE (computer-supported education), syntactic parsing (Comenius, Butler, Cogito) for grammar and writing instruction/computational linguistics (CONST) and for spelling (DT-manie). During this period of research Beeken also worked on the development of electronic dictionaries: Beknopte ABN-gids (Concise guide to Standard Dutch) with Dirk Geeraerts and Dirk Speelman. From 1993–1996 Beeken continued her research with the NFWO project, 'De lexicale thesaurus als begin- en eindpunt van de interactie tussen lexicologische theorie en lexicografische toepassing' (The lexical thesaurus as starting and finishing point of the interaction between lexicological theory and lexicographic application) From 1997–1999 Beeken was employed by the Dutch Language Union (Taalunie) to work on the revision of the Groene Boekje 1995 (Green Booklet 1995) towards the creation of the 2005 Groene Boekje. She also was the project manager of the Dutch HLT Agency / TST-Centrale from 2004 to 2007. From 2007 to 2014 Jeannine Beeken was director of the Institute for Dutch Lexicology.

== Contribution to Dutch linguistics ==
Beeken's first major contribution to Dutch linguistics was the design and construction of the first analytical software for Dutch syntax. Her work continued to impact on the Dutch language with her development of Dutch spelling algorithms concerning the problems of DT in the 1990s and her writing of the revised Dutch spelling rules in 2005 Groene Boekje. Beeken's PhD broke new Dutch linguistic grounds when she identified and named 3 additional objects; Directional (DIR), Directional-Locational (DIL) and Temporal (TP), publishing 'Spiegelstructuur en variabiliteit' (Mirror structure and variability: prepositions and postpositions in Dutch) in 1993. Beeken has courted controversy with her opposition to traditional dictionary making, arguing for modern theoretical and computational adaptations and solutions to lexicological and lexicographical problems and challenges.

== Publications ==
Throughout Beeken's career, her publications have covered a breadth of linguistic areas. She was also interested in solutions for academic unemployment. In 1994 she contributed briefly to Roger Blanpain book ‘The nine zeros of learning Flanders. From repetitive to creative jobs’, and in 1995 she addressed the feminisation of job titles for the Flemish social-economic council (Sociaal-Economische Raad van Vlaanderen) and the Ministries in Flanders and the Netherlands. More recently her published work has focused on lexicology, computational lexicography, digitised language resources and spelling, including her contribution to ‘Hebrew and Yiddish words in Dutch’, and her involvement in the Dutch Medical Journal, publishing ‘The successful disclosure of a medical journal through a medical lexicon’.
