= Leslie Saxon =

Professor of linguistics

Leslie Saxon is a professor of linguistics at the University of Victoria. She received both a BA and an MA from the University of Toronto and a PhD from the University of California, San Diego. Before coming to the University of Victoria in 1991, she also taught at Memorial University of Newfoundland.

Saxon is an advocate for the revitalization of the First Nations languages of Canada, and is especially involved in the Tłı̨chǫ community in the Northwest Territories, including being involved in many community projects and co-editing a dictionary of Tłı̨chǫ Yatıì (a Dene language, also known as Dogrib) with Mary Siemens in 1996. Saxon's and Siemen's dictionary is now available online.

Besides her community involvement, Saxon is also involved in theoretical research, including research on the syntax of pronouns and other noun phrases, clause structure, morphology, and historical linguistics.

From 2013 to 2015, she was president of the Canadian Linguistic Association.
