= Niina Ning Zhang =

Chinese linguist

Niina Ning Zhong
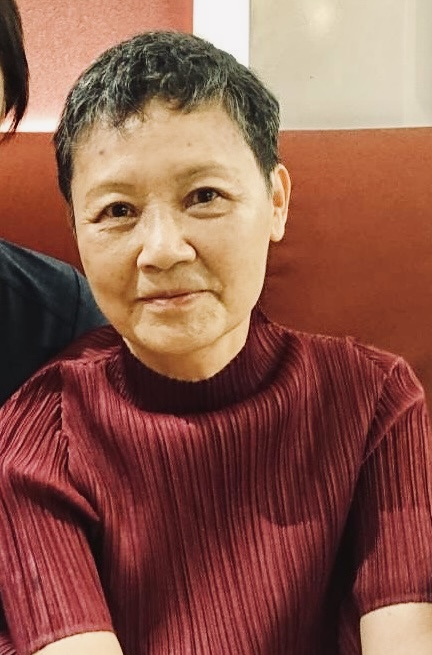
- Born: Hohhot, Inner Mongolia, PR China
- Occupations: Researcher, professor of linguistics
- Awards: Outstanding Research Award, National Science and Technology Council (Taiwan); Ministry of Education Academic Award, Ministry of Education (Taiwan); Scholarly Monograph Award in the Humanities and Social Sciences, Academia Sinica; Award for Junior Research Investigators, Academia Sinica
- Scientific career
- Fields: Generative grammar; Syntax; Syntax-semantics interface; Chinese linguistics
- Workplaces: National Chung Cheng University, Taiwan (2003-) Past: University of Toronto, Canada (1993–97); Zentrum für Allgemeine Sprachwissenschaft (ZAS), Germany (1997–2003)
- Thesis: Syntactic Dependencies in Mandarin Chinese (1997)
- Doctoral advisors: Diane Massam
- Website: sites.google.com/view/lngnz

Niina Ning Zhang (born in Hohhot, Inner Mongolia, PR China) is a theoretical linguist specializing in Mandarin Chinese syntax and semantics.

== Education and career ==
Zhang obtained her M.A. degree in linguistics from Shanghai International Studies University, Ph.D. degrees in linguistics from Shanghai International Studies University and, in 1997, from the University of Toronto, Canada.

In 1997-2003, she was a researcher in Zentrum für Allgemeine Sprachwissenschaft (ZAS). Now she is a professor of the Institute of Linguistics, National Chung Cheng University. She has also taught linguistic courses in Shanghai International Studies University, University of Toronto, and Humboldt-Universitaet zu Berlin.

Her research specialty is formal syntax, especially the syntax of coordinate constructions. In her book Coordination in Syntax (2010 Cambridge University Press), she argues for four radical claims: (1) conjuncts are syntactically asymmetrical; (2) there is no independent syntactic category for coordinators; (3) Ross's (1967) Coordinate Structure Constraint is not a construction-specific syntactic constraint; (4) Across-The-Board Movement does not exist.

In her book Coordinate Structures (2023 Cambridge University Press), she further claims that the syntax of coordination and modification, the two types of non-argument relation, can be unified: they both have a categoryless functional element. She also identifies the linker position of coordinators and shared properties of coordinators and modification markers. She proposes the formulations of various coordinate constructions, including different types of the across-the-board constructions.

== Main publications ==
=== Books and Ph.D. dissertations ===
- Zhang, Ning. 2023. Coordinate Structures. Elements in Generative Syntax. Cambridge: Cambridge University Press.
- Zhang, N. 2013. Classifier Structures in Mandarin Chinese. Berlin: Mouton De Gruyter.
- Zhang, N. 2010. Coordination in Syntax. Cambridge Studies in Linguistics Series 123, Cambridge: Cambridge University Press.
- Schwabe, Kerstin and N. Zhang (eds.). 2000. Ellipsis in Conjunction. Tuebingen: Niemeyer.
- Zhang, N. 1997. Syntactic Dependencies in Mandarin Chinese. Ph.D. dissertation. University of Toronto.
- Zhang, N. 1990. Chinese Slips of the Tongue and Models of Language Production. Ph.D. dissertation. Shanghai International Studies University.

=== Main journal articles ===
- Zhang, N. 2025. Light predicate raising in the Mandarin post-VP adverbial nominal constructions. Language and Linguistics 26 (2).
- Zhang, N. 2024. Unraveling syntactic puzzles of comparative correlatives. Journal of East Asian Linguistics.
- Zhang, N. 2024. Coordinators and modification markers as categoryless functional elements. Nordlyd 48 (1): 39-57.
- Zhang, N. 2022. Defective Incorporating Verbs in Mandarin. Language and Linguistics 23 (2): 329-348.
- Zhang, N. 2022. Agentless Presupposition and Implicit and Non-Canonical Objects in Mandarin. Cahiers de Linguistique Asie Orientale 51 (1): 81-104.
- Zhang, N. 2022. Kind-Level Predicates of Events Inside Another Predication. Studia Linguistica 76 (2): 315-353.
- Zhang, N. 2021. Pairing Degree-WH Clauses in Mandarin. Studies in Chinese Linguistics 42 (2): 121-160.
- Zhang, N. 2020. Two categorial issues of degree constructions in Mandarin. Journal of East Asian Linguistics 30 (3): 217-229.
- Zhang, N. 2020. External Degree Constructions in Mandarin. Journal of East Asian Linguistics 29 (4): 365-392.
- Zhang, N. 2020. Low predicate inversion. Journal of East Asian Linguistics 29 (2): 159-207.
- Zhang, N. 2019c. Appearance and Existence in Mandarin Chinese. Studies in Chinese Linguistics 40 (2):101–140.
- Zhang, N. 2019b. Sentence-final aspect particles as finite markers in Mandarin Chinese. Linguistics 57 (5): 967–1023.
- Zhang, N. 2019a. Complex indefinites and the projection of DP in Mandarin Chinese. Journal of East Asian Linguistics 28: 179–210.
- Zhang, N. 2018. Non-canonical objects as event kind-classifying elements. Natural Language & Linguistic Theory 36 (4): 1395–1437.
- Zhang, N. 2017b. The syntax of event-internal and event-external verbal classifiers. Studia Linguistica 71: 266-300.
- Zhang, N. 2017a. Unifying two general licensors of completive adverbials in syntax. Linguistics 55 (2): 371-411.
- Zhang, N. 2016b. Identifying Chinese dependent clauses in the forms of subjects. Journal of East Asian Linguistics 25 (3): 275-311.
- Zhang, N. 2016a. Understanding S-Selection. Studies in Chinese Linguistics 37 (1): 56-73.
- Zhang, N. 2015c. The Morphological Expression of Plurality and Pluractionality in Mandarin. Lingua 165: 1-27.
- Zhang, N. 2015b. Functional Head Properties of the Degree Word Hen in Mandarin Chinese. Lingua 153: 14-41.
- Zhang, N. 2015a. Nominal-internal phrasal movement in Mandarin. The Linguistic Review 32 (2): 375-425.
- Zhang, N. 2014. Expressing Number Productively in Mandarin Chinese. Linguistics 52 (1): 1-34.
- Zhang, N. 2014. Summing quantities of objects at the left edge. Taiwan Journal of Linguistics 12 (2): 33 - 57.
- Zhang, N. 2013. Encoding Unexpectedness by Aspect Inflection. Concentric: Studies in Linguistics 39 (1): 23-57.
- Zhang, N. 2012. Projecting semantic features. Studia Linguistica 66 (1): 58-74.
- Zhang, N. 2009. The Syntax of Same and ATB Constructions. Canadian Journal of Linguistics 54 (2): 367-399.
- Zhang, N. 2008. Gapless relative clauses as clausal licensers of relational nouns, Language and Linguistics 9 (4): 1005-1028.
- Zhang, N. 2008. Existential Coda Constructions as Internally Headed Relative Clause Constructions. The Linguistics Journal 3 (3): 8-57.
- Zhang, N. 2008. Repetitive and Correlative Coordinators as Focus Particles Parasitic on Coordinators. SKY Journal of Linguistics 21: 295-342.
- Zhang, N. 2007. The Syntactic Derivations of Two Paired Dependency Constructions. Lingua 117 (12): 2134-2158.
- Zhang, N. 2007. Root merger in Chinese compounds. Studia Linguistica 61 (2): 170-184.
- Zhang, N. 2007. A syntactic account of the Direct Object Restriction in Chinese. Language Research 43 (1): 53-75.
- Zhang, N. 2007. The Syntax of English Comitative Constructions. Folia Linguistica 41: 135-169.
- Zhang, N. 2006. Representing Specificity by the Internal Order of Indefinites. Linguistics 44 (1): 1-21.
- Zhang, N. 2000. Object Shift in Mandarin Chinese. Journal of Chinese Linguistics 28 (2): 201-246.
- Zhang, N. 1998. The Interactions Between Lexical Meanings and Construction Meanings. Linguistics 36 (5): 957-980.
- Zhang, N. 1998. Argument Interpretations of the Ditransitive Construction. Nordic Journal of Linguistics 21: 179-209.
- Zhang, N. 1997. The Avoidance of the Third Tone Sandhi in Mandarin Chinese, Journal of East Asian Linguistics 6: 293-338.

=== Main book chapter articles ===
- Zhang, N. 2017b. Verbal classifiers. In R. Sybesma, W. Behr, Y. Gu, Z. Handel, C.-T. J. Huang, & J. Myers (eds.), Encyclopedia of Chinese Language and Linguistics. Leiden: Brill. Vol. 1: 627-631.
- Zhang, N. 2017a. Adpositions. In R. Sybesma, W. Behr, Y. Gu, Z. Handel, C.-T. J. Huang, & J. Myers (eds.), Encyclopedia of Chinese Language and Linguistics. Leiden: Brill. Vol. 1: 116-122.
- Zhang, N. 2012. Countability and numeral classifiers in Mandarin Chinese. In Diane Massam (ed.), Count and Mass Across Languages. Oxford: Oxford University Press: 220-237.
- Zhang, N. 2009. The Syntax of Relational-Nominal Second Constructions in Chinese. Yuyanxue Luncong 39. Beijing: Peking University Press: 257-301.
- Zhang, N. 2007. On the Categorial Issue of Coordination. Lingua et Linguistica 1.1. Lulu Press: 7-45.
- Zhang, N. 2002. Movement within a Spatial Phrase. In: Hubert Cuyckens and Guenter Radden (eds.), Perspectives on Prepositions. Linguistische Arbeiten. Band 454. Tuebingen: Max Niemeyer: 47–63.
