= Yamada Yoshio =

Japanese linguist

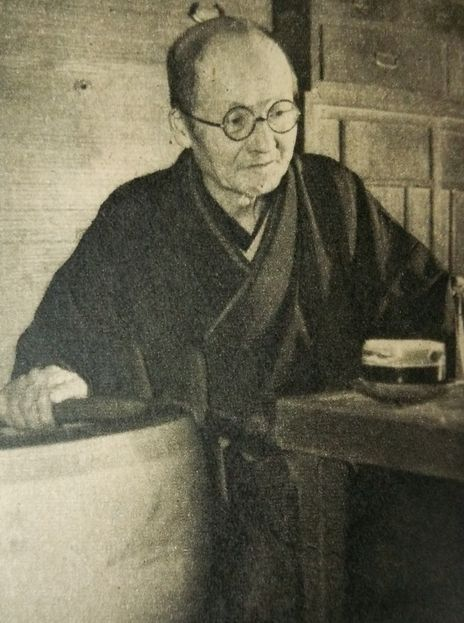
Yamada Yoshio in 1953

Yamada Yoshio (山田 孝雄; August 20, 1873 – November 20, 1958) was a Japanese linguist. He founded the influential "Yamada grammar" (Also known as "Yamada's grammar", and was the first to use the word "chinjutsu" as a linguistic term.

== Yamada's Grammar ==
Yamada Yoshio's grammar was first published in 1912 and underwent several changes and reprints.

Yamada's grammar greatly influenced 20th century scholarship in Japan.
