= Motoki Tokieda =

Japanese linguist (1900–1967)

Motoki Tokieda (時枝 誠記, Tokieda Motoki; 1900– 27 October 1967) was a professor of Japanese linguistics at University of Tokyo. He is noted for developing the Process Theory of Language (言語過程説, gengo katei setsu) and his criticism of Ferdinand de Saussure.

== Biography ==
Tokieda was born on December 6, 1900, in Tokyo. In his early years, he was already interested in the Japanese language and resolved to devote his life's work on this field. He became a pupil of Shinkichi Hashimoto. However, he criticized Hashimoto's Japanese grammar and created his own "Tokieda grammar".

== Language process theory ==
The introduction of Saussure's work, particularly Cours, launched a significant semiotic argument in linguistic in Japan. Tokieda presented his own theory in opposition to that of Saussure, which turned out to be based on his misinterpretation of the latter's position. It was presented in his book Principles of the Japanese Language: Establishment and Development of Language Process Theory. It became evident that Tokieda's position is aligned with Saussure because the latter maintained that "general linguistics" is not about language in general. This is similar to Tokieda's view of "extreme specialization" of the Japanese grammar through the study of kokugaku or Japanese classics.

Tokieda's theory also criticized Yoshio Yamada's position that kokugogaku should only refer to studies done by Japanese people on their own language and exclude those undertaken by foreigners. According to Tokieda, the difference in terms of research conducted by the Japanese and foreign scholars rests on the used approaches and that one cannot say one is kokugogaku and the other is not. Tokieda also stressed that the concept of kokugo must not be defined as the language of the Japanese Empire but as one that it is based on its internal linguistic characteristics.

== Bibliography ==
- Tokieda (1940). The History of Japanese Linguistics (國語學史, Kokugogaku shi)
- Tokieda (1941). The Principles of Japanese Linguistics (國語學原論, Kokugogaku genron)
