= Susanne Wurmbrand =

Austrian linguist

- Occupation: Linguist

Academic background
- Education: Massachusetts Institute of Technology (PhD)
- Thesis: Infinitives (1998)
- Doctoral advisor: Noam Chomsky; Alec Marantz; David Pesetsky

Academic work
- Discipline: Linguistics; Syntax
- Sub-discipline: Germanic Linguistics; Syntax-semantics Interface; Language Variation
- Institutions: University of Vienna; Harvard University; University of Connecticut; McGill University
- Website: susiwurmbrand.com

Susanne "Susi" Wurmbrand (German pronunciation: [ˈsuːsi ˈvʊʁmbʁant]) is an Austrian linguist specializing in syntax.

== Education and career ==
Wurmbrand received her PhD from the Massachusetts Institute of Technology in 1998 with a thesis titled Infinitives supervised by Noam Chomsky, Alec Marantz and David Pesetsky. In 2018 she received her Habilitation from the University of Vienna.

Since 2024, she has been a University Professor of Linguistics at the University of Salzburg. She has previously held faculty positions at McGill University, University of Connecticut, the University of Vienna and Harvard University.

== Honors ==
Wurmbrand is the Editor-in-Chief of the Journal of Comparative Germanic Linguistics, an Associate Editor of Language, and a co-editor of the book series Open Generative Syntax published by Language Science Press.

In 2020 she was elected member of Academia Europaea and was elected Chair of GLOW in 2022.

She has been a member of the Committee on Gender Equity in Linguistics of the Linguistic Society of America.

== Selected works ==
- Wurmbrand, Susanne (1998). Infinitives (Thesis). Massachusetts Institute of Technology.
- Wurmbrand, Susanne (2001). Infinitives: Restructuring and clause structure. Mouton de Gruyter.
- Wurmbrand, Susanne (2004). "Two types of restructuring: Lexical vs. functional". Lingua. 114 (8): 991–1014. doi:10.1016/S0024-3841(03)00102-5.
- Bobaljik, Jonathan David and Susanne Wurmbrand (2005). The domain of agreement. Natural Language and Linguistic Theory 23.4: 809-865.
- Wurmbrand, Susanne (2006). "Licensing Case". Journal of Germanic Linguistics. 18 (3): 175–236. doi:10.1017/S1470542706000079.
- Wurmbrand, Susanne. (2007). How complex are complex predicates. Syntax 10: 243-288.
- Wurmbrand, Susanne. (2014). Tense and aspect in English infinitives. Linguistic Inquiry 45.3: 403-447. doi: 10.1162/LING_a_00161
- Wurmbrand, Susanne. (2017). Verb clusters, verb raising, and restructuring. In: The Blackwell Companion to Syntax 2, ed. by Martin Everaert and Henk van Riemsdijk. Oxford: Blackwell.
- Lohninger, Magdalena, Iva Kovač, and Susanne Wurmbrand. (2022). From Prolepsis to Hyperraising. Philosophies 7.2: 32.
- Wurmbrand, Susanne und Magdalena Lohninger. (In press). An implicational universal in complementation—Theoretical insights and empirical progress. In: Propositional Arguments in Cross-Linguistic Research: Theoretical and Empirical Issues, ed. by Jutta Hartmann and Angelika Wöllstein. Berlin: Mouton de Gruyter.
