= Henk van Riemsdijk =

Dutch linguist (born 1948)

- Born: 27 April 1948 (age 78); The Hague
- Education: B.A., Paris 8 University Vincennes-Saint-Denis, M.A., University of Amsterdam, Ph.D. University of Amsterdam
- Known for: Prepositional phrases, free relatives, grafts, Germanic syntax
- Scientific career
- Fields: Linguistics, generative grammar
- Workplaces: Tilburg University
- Doctoral advisor: Simon Dik

Henk van Riemsdijk (born 27 April 1948 in The Hague, The Netherlands) is a Dutch linguist and professor emeritus at Tilburg University.

== Career ==
Van Riemsdijk studied linguistics at the Paris 8 University Vincennes-Saint-Denis and at the University of Amsterdam, where he received his PhD in 1978. He was appointed assistant professor at Amsterdam University (1976-1981) and was later appointed full professor of Theoretical Linguistics at Tilburg University (1981-2006).

Van Riemsdijk played a major role in building a scientific infrastructure for generative linguistics in Europe. With Jan Koster and Jean-Roger Vergnaud, he was one of the founders of GLOW, the main European organization of generative linguistics. From 1977-1990, he served as chairman of GLOW. He was co-founder and editor of the journal The Linguistic Review (with Riny Huybregts and Jan Koster), and co-founder and editor of three book series: (i) Studies in Generative Grammar, published by Mouton de Gruyter (with Jan Koster and Harry van der Hulst); (ii) Comprehensive Grammar Resources, published by Amsterdam University Press (with István Kenesei): (iii) the Wiley-Blackwell Companions to Linguistics (with Martin Everaert).

== Research interests ==
Van Riemsdijk made notable contributions to theoretical syntax. His 1978 dissertation on the syntax of prepositional phrases led to a better understanding of the internal structure of prepositional phrases and the phenomenon of preposition stranding. In later work he showed that, just like nominal and verbal projections, the adpositional projection can contain functional material, specifically so-called functional prepositions (Van Riemsdijk 1990). A second central research interest concerns linguistic expressions that cannot be captured easily in terms of a single canonical tree structure, such as far from simple in a far from simple matter. Van Riemsdijk proposes that these linguistic expressions have two distinct structures, both canonical tree structures, that are joined together (“grafted”) in a single complex tree structure (Van Riemsdijk 2001). A third important line of research addressed the question to what extent components of grammar, specifically syntax and phonology, are formally distinct or whether they overlap in some of their properties. In several publications, Van Riemsdijk proposed that there are fundamental formal similarities between principles of syntax and principles of phonology. Besides these major lines of research, he contributed to the study of many other linguistic phenomena, including case, pied piping, parasitic gaps, free relatives, semi-lexical categories, verb (projection) raising, and split topicalization.

== Honors and distinctions ==
In 2011, Van Riemsdijk became Honorary member of the Linguistic Society of America, and in 2012, he received Honorary Doctorates from the University of Bucharest and the University of Szeged.

Van Riemsdijk has served on the editorial and advisory board of many leading journals in linguistics. He was European editor for Linguistic Inquiry (1978-1980), editor (1980-1992) and consulting editor (1992 – present) of The Linguistic Review (1980-1992), and editor of The Journal of Comparative Germanic Linguistics (2001-2013). He was member of the advisory/editorial board of Linguistic Analysis (1975-1979), Linguistics (1992-2002), Biolinguistics (2006-present), English Linguistics (2010-present), Studies in Chinese Linguistics (2011-present),Transactions of the Philological Society (2016-2019), and Angelica Wratislaviensia (2017-present).

Van Riemsdijk was honored with two festschrifts: (i) Grammar in Progress: GLOW essays for Henk van Riemsdijk (Dordrecht: Foris / Berlin: Mouton de Gruyter; (eds.) Joan Mascaró and Marina Nespor), and (ii) Organizing Grammar. Linguistic studies in honor of Henk van Riemsdijk (Berlin: Mouton de Gruyter; (eds.) Hans Broekhuis, Norbert Corver, Riny Huijbregts, Ursula Kleinhenz, Jan Koster).

== Selected publications ==
=== Books ===
- Van Riemsdijk, Henk. (1978). A Case Study in Syntactic Markedness: The Binding Nature of Prepositional Phrases. Dordrecht: Foris.
- Van Riemsdijk, Henk; Chomsky, Noam; Huybregts, Riny. (1982). The Generative Enterprise – A Discussion with Noam Chomsky. Dordrecht: Foris.
- Van Riemsdijk, Henk; Williams, Edwin. (1986). Introduction to the Theory of Grammar. Cambridge, MA: MIT Press.
- Van Riemsdijk, Henk (ed.). (1999). Clitics in the Languages of Europe. Vol VIII of Language Typology. Berlin: Mouton de Gruyter.
- Van Riemsdijk, Henk; Corver, Norbert (eds.). (2001). Semi-Lexical Categories: The Content of Function Words and the Function of Content Words. Berlin: Mouton de Gruyter.
- Chomsky, Noam; Van Riemsdijk, Henk; Huijbregts, Riny; Fukui, Naoki; Zushi, Mihoko. (2004). The Generative Enterprise Revisited. Berlin: Mouton de Gruyter.
- Van Oostendorp, Marc; Van Riemsdijk, Henk (eds.). (2015). Representing Structure in Phonology and Syntax. Berlin: Mouton de Gruyter.
- Everaert, Martin; Van Riemsdijk, Henk (eds.). (2017). The Wiley Blackwell Companion to Syntax, Second Edition. Volumes I-VIII, v-xxix and 1-5131.

=== Articles ===
- Van Riemsdijk, Henk (1978). "On the diagnosis of Wh-movement". In Keyser, Samuel J. (ed.). Recent Transformational Studies in European Languages. MIT Press. pp. 189–206.
- Van Riemsdijk, Henk; Groos, Anneke (1981). "Matching effects in free relatives: a parameter of core grammar". In Belletti, Adriana; Brandi, Luciana; Rizzi, Luigi (eds.). Theory of Markedness in Generative Grammar: Proceedings of the 1979 GLOW Conference. Annali della Scuola Normale Superiore di Pisa. pp. 171–216.
- Van Riemsdijk, Henk; Williams, Edwin (1981). "NP-structure". Linguistic Review. 1: 171–217.
- Van Riemsdijk, Henk (1982). "Locality principles in syntax and phonology". In Yang, I-S. (ed.). Linguistics in the Morning Calm: Proceedings of the Linguistics Society of Korea International Conference, Seoul, 1981. Hanshin Publishing Co. pp. 211–231.
- Van Riemsdijk, Henk (1983). "The case of German adjectives". In Heny, Frank; Richards, Norvin (eds.). Grammatical Categories: Auxiliaries and Related Puzzles. Volume 1. Reidel. pp. 223–252.
- Van Riemsdijk, Henk (1985). "On pied piped infinitives in German relative clauses". In Toman, Jindrich (ed.). Issues in the Grammar of German. Foris Publications. pp. 165–192.
- Van Riemsdijk, Henk; Huybregts, M.A.C. (1985). "Parasitic gaps and ATB". Proceedings of the North Eastern Linguistic Society (NELS). 15: 168–187.
- Van Riemsdijk, Henk; Haegeman, Liliane (1986). "Verb Projection Raising, scope, and the typology of verb movement rules". Linguistic Inquiry. 17: 417–466.
- Van Riemsdijk, Henk (1989). "Movement and Regeneration". In Benincà, Paola (ed.). Dialect Variation and the Theory of Grammar. Foris Publications. pp. 105–136.
- Van Riemsdijk, Henk (1990). "Functional prepositions". In Pinkster, Harm; Genée, Inge (eds.). Unity and Diversity: Papers Presented to Simon C. Dik on His 50th Birthday. Foris Publications.
- Van Riemsdijk, Henk (1998). "Head movement and adjacency". Natural Language and Linguistic Theory. 16: 633–678.
- Van Riemsdijk, Henk (1998). "Categorial feature magnetism: The endocentricity and distribution of projections". Journal of Comparative Germanic Linguistics. 2: 1–48.
- Van Riemsdijk, Henk (2001). "A far from simple matter: syntactic reflexes of syntax-pragmatics misalignments". In Kenesei, István; Harnish, Robert M. (eds.). Semantics, Pragmatics and Discourse: A Festschrift for Ferenc Kiefer. John Benjamins Publishing Company. pp. 21–41.
- Van Riemsdijk, Henk (2002). "The unbearable lightness of Going". The Journal of Comparative Germanic Linguistics. 5: 143–196.
- Van Riemsdijk, Henk (2006). "Grafts follow from Merge". In Frascareli, M. (ed.). Phases of Interpretation. Berlin: Mouton de Gruyter. pp. 17–44.
- Van Riemsdijk, Henk (2008). "Identity Avoidance: OCP-effects in Swiss relatives". In Freidin, R.; Otero, C.; Zubizarreta, M.-L. (eds.). Foundational Issues in Linguistic Theory. Cambridge, MA: MIT Press.
- Van Riemsdijk, Henk (2019). "Elements of syntax: Repulsion and attraction". In Jianhua, Hu; Haihua, Pan (eds.). Interfaces in Grammar. Amsterdam: John Benjamins Publishing Company. pp. 25–47.
