= Michal Temkin Martinez =

Linguist

Michal Temkin Martinez is a linguist who has worked on Somali, Chizigula, and Modern Hebrew. Temkin Martinez received her PhD from University of Southern California in 2010. She is currently a professor at Boise State University and is the founding director of the Mary Ellen Ryder Linguistics Lab. Her current research focuses on languages spoken in refugee communities and integrating experimental methodology with language documentation.

In spring 2010, Temkin Martinez worked with retired Boise State professor Jon Dayley to create the Boise Language Project (BLP). The project objective is "to document the languages spoken by those arriving to Boise as refugees while serving that community through outreach activities". As an initiative of the Mary Ellen Ryder Linguistics Lab, the project also provides internship experience in language documentation for undergraduate students of linguistics at Boise State. As of 2021, Temkin Martinez is the director of the program. She also directs the Languages of Boise project, which seeks to develop a web application hosting resources and information about languages spoken by refugees in Boise, Idaho to improve communication between refugees and service providers in the area.

Since 2010, Temkin Martinez has worked with Jon Dayley and Mwaliko Mberwa to develop the first dictionary of Somali Chizigula (Swahili: Kizigua, also known as Mushungulu) and English. In January 2020 the web edition of the dictionary, Chizigula of Somalia Dictionary, was formally published at Webonary, where it has been hosted since 2013.

Temkin Martinez is an Associate Editor of the Teaching Linguistics section of Language, the journal of the Linguistic Society of America (LSA). In 2018 Temkin Martinez served as the Senior Chair of the LSA's Committee on Endangered Languages and their Preservation (CELP).

== Publications ==
- Temkin Martinez, Michal and Vanessa Rosenbaum (undergraduate student). Accepted. "Acoustic and Aerodynamic Data for Somali Chizigula Stops" In Africa's Endangered Languages: Documentary and Theoretical Approaches. Jason Kandybowicz and Harold Torrence (eds.).
- Soelberg, Terri; Temkin Martinez, Michal; Black, Mikal; and Springer, Pamela. 2015b. "Training African Refugee Interpreters for Health Related Research." Online Journal of Cultural Competence in Nursing and Healthcare.
- Black, Mikal; Springer, Pamela; Soelberg, Terri; and Temkin Martinez, Michal. 2015a. "Health Conditions of Post Resettlement African Refugees in Boise, ID." Online Journal of Cultural Competence in Nursing and Healthcare.
