= Hilda Koopman =

American linguist

Hilda Judith Koopman
- Born: 1953 (age 72–73); Nijmegen
- Education: B.A., University of Amsterdam;, B.A, University of Amsterdam:, Ph.D., University of Tilburg
- Scientific career
- Fields: Linguistics
- Workplaces: University of California, Los Angeles, UCLA
- Academic advisors: Henk van Riemsdijk, Kenneth Hale

Hilda Judith Koopman is a linguist who does research and fieldwork in the areas of syntax and morphology. She is a professor in the department of Linguistics at the University of California, Los Angeles, and is the director of the SSWL (Syntactic and Semantic Structures of the World's Languages) database. The SSWL, which she together with Dennis Shasha inherited from Chris Collins at New York University NYU, is an open-ended database of syntactic, morphological, and semantic properties.

== Research interests ==
Hilda Koopman is interested in both theoretical linguistics and field linguistics. Her area of specialization includes linguistic theory, fieldwork, syntax, morphology, comparative syntax. As a field linguist, she has worked on various (un(der)described) languages. Some of the languages and language family she has worked on include the following: Kru languages (Vata, Dida, Gbadi..), Gur (Nawdem), Mande (Bambara), Kwa (Abe(y)..), Grassfield Bantu (Nweh, Ncufie, Bafanji), West Atlantic language (Wolof, Fulani), Bantu (Ndendeule, Siswati), Nilotic (Maasai, Dholuo), Austronesian languages (Malagasy, Javanese, Samoan, Tongan), Creole languages (Haitian, Sranan, Saramaccan).

== Career ==
Koopman has been a professor of Linguistics at UCLA since 1985. She served on the editorial boards of Oxford University Press (comparative syntax), Studies in Natural Language and Linguistic Theory, Kluwer Academic Publishers (Book series), Natural Language and Linguistic Theory, and The Journal of Comparative Germanic Linguistics.

== Selected publications ==
- 1983. ECP effects in main clauses Linguistic Inquiry, 14(2), pp. 346–350.
- 1986. "A Note on Long Extraction in Vata and the ECP". Natural Language & Linguistic Theory 4(3), pp. 357–374.
- 1994. "Licensing heads". In D. Lightfoot and N. Hornstein (eds), Verb movement, pp. 261–295.
- 1997. "Unifying predicate cleft constructions." In K. Moore (ed.), Annual Meeting of the Berkeley Linguistics Society (Vol. 23, No. 2, pp. 71–85).
- 2002. "Derivations and complexity filters". In A. Alexiadou, E. Anagnostopoulou, S Barbiers, H Gaertner (eds), Dimensions of Movement: From features to remnants, 48, p. 151-189.
- 2014b. "Recursion restrictions: Where grammars count." In T. Roeper and M. Speas (eds.), Recursion: Complexity in Cognition (pp. 17–38). Springer International Publishing.
- 2014a. "The que/qui alternation: new analytical directions" (with Dominique Sportiche). In Peter Svenonius (ed), Functional Structure From Top to Toe. Oxford University Press.
- 2016. "A Further Step towards a Minimalist Analysis of Japanese -no" (with Tomoko Ishizuka). Presented at the 24th Japanese/Korean Linguistics Conference.
- 2017. "Neurophysiological dynamics of phrase-structure building during sentence processing" (with Nelson, M.J., El Karoui, I., Giber, K., Yang, X., Cohen, L., Cash, S.S., Naccache, L., Hale, J.T., Pallier, C. and Dehaene, S.). Proceedings of the National Academy of Sciences, p. 201701590.
