= Heptapod languages =

Constructed alien languages

Heptapod A and B
- Created by: Ted Chiang
- Setting and usage: "Story of Your Life" novella and Arrival film
- Purpose: Constructed language: Artistic language; Fictional language; Heptapod A and B
- Writing system: Logographic script
- Sources: A priori languages

Language codes
- ISO 639-2: none
- ISO 639-3: None (mis)

The Heptapod languages are two constructed fictional languages used in Ted Chiang's novella, "Story of Your Life", as well as its later film adaptation, Arrival. In-universe, they are used by the "heptapods", an alien race that makes contact with humanity.

The languages are classified by two separate names, "Heptapod A" and "Heptapod B", as the species uses two separate languages; the former is a spoken language, and the latter a semasiography. These two languages together encapsulate two different concepts of time—Heptapod B presents time as synchronous, while A presents time as sequential, with causality. The two languages are grammatically unrelated.

A written form for Heptapod B was developed for Arrival by production designer Patrice Vermette and his wife Martine Bertrand, based on the descriptions in "Story of Your Life".

== Heptapod language in Arrival ==
=== Heptapod A ===
During the development of the film Arrival, director Denis Villeneuve and sound designer Sylvain Bellemare wanted to deviate from the typical electronic sounds used in many science fiction films and instead wanted the sound of Heptapod A to be "very organic."

Sound design for Heptapod A initially began with Dave Whitehead, a sound designer who had previously worked on several Peter Jackson films. Whitehead used animal sound recordings, such as whale songs and cat purrs, along with altered recordings of his voice to create the sounds of Heptapod A. He worked alongside McGill professor Morgan Sonderegger, who served as a linguistics consultant and assisted in splicing the sounds during the development of the language.

=== Heptapod B ===
While Martine Bertrand and Patrice Vermette are given credit for the creation of Heptapod B in Arrival, the language was a collaborative effort of the crew. Conceptualization began with screenwriter of the film, Eric Heisserer, who decided to base Heptapod B's circular script on the etchings in the One Ring from The Lord of the Rings. Due to this, Heisserer's circular illustrations of Heptapod B initially bore a strong resemblance to J. R. R Tolkien's Tengwar script.

Afterwards, Vermette, the production designer for Arrival, worked alongside other crew members to further develop Heptapod B. Despite consulting with linguists and graphic designers, Vermette and the crew continued to struggle with developing the appearance of the characters. They researched languages such as Arabic, ancient Asian languages, and dialects from North Africa to gain inspiration, but found that this would cause Heptapod B to resemble human language more closely than alien language.

After several attempts to create a design for Heptapod B, Vermette's wife, artist Martine Bertrand, offered to sketch some conceptual designs for the language. Bertrand approached Vermette with some designs for Heptapod B, which deviated from the more mathematical or hieroglyphic conceptualizations the crew had come up with, and instead appeared as more "inky and smoky" characters. These designs were approved by director Denis Villeneuve, who gave Bertrand the task of developing 15 similar designs for Heptapod B.

Once the design for Heptapod B was developed, Patrice Vermette and his team oversaw the semantics behind the characters. After several characters and definitions were developed, Stephen Wolfram, computer scientist and founder of Wolfram Mathematica, and his son, Christopher, were asked to analyze them; they did so utilising the Wolfram Language to section each character into 12 different parts in order, and found that certain patterns repeated through the characters. Heptapod B characters were also sent to Jessica Coon, an associate professor in linguistics at McGill University who was asked to annotate the characters as if she were analyzing them in real life. As Vermette and his team gained more insight on the semantics behind Heptapod B, they developed a dictionary of roughly 100 Heptapod B logograms, 71 of which were used in the film. With their research into Heptapod B, both Vermette and Christopher Wolfram stated that resources were available to build a larger vocabulary for Heptapod B, but this process would require an extensive amount of time.

== Heptapod language in "Story of Your Life" ==
=== Heptapod A ===
In "Story of Your Life", Heptapod A, the vocal communication of the heptapods, is described as sounding "vaguely like that of a wet dog shaking the water out of its fur." Although Heptapod A contains some grammar structures that are similar to that of human language, the language often breaks linguistic universals found in human language, as it is designed to "provide flexibility within the confines of sequential speech".

==== Grammar ====
Heptapod A uses case markers to indicate whether a noun is a subject or object of the sentence; the language has a free word order, which extends to conditional clause, unlike the majority of natural languages, where a fixed word order of an antecedent always preceding its consequent for this construction is a linguistic universal.

===== Center-embedding of clauses =====
Heptapod A also utilizes center embedding in sentences, which involves the embedding of a clause into the middle of another clause of the same type. Although center embedding is a common practice for human languages, Heptapod A permits an unlimited amount of center embedding in sentences, which would severely complicate the meaning of human sentences.

Jessica Coon illustrates the increasingly complicated nature of center embedding in a sentence:

a. The cat fell.

b. The cat [ that the dog chased ] fell.

c. The cat [ that the dog [ that the mouse scared ] chased ] fell.

d. The cat [ that the dog [ that the mouse [ that the bird saw ] scared ] chased ] fell.

The lack of large scale recursive center embedding has been claimed to be an issue of human short-term memory, due to the difficulty of remembering large numbers of pairs of subjects and predicates; the depth of center embedding is for the most part zero in spoken language, and rarely exceeding three in written language. The presence of unlimited center embedding in Heptapod A implies that heptapods can easily handle the cognitive load required to understand multiple center embedding.

=== Heptapod B ===
==== Orthography ====
In "Story of Your Life", Heptapod B, the written language of the heptapods, is described as looking "like fanciful praying mantids drawn in a cursive style, all clinging to each other to form an Escheresque lattice, each slightly different in its stance." The script consists of a series of semagrams. Heptapod B is semasiographic; the language does not have a spoken form. This presents a large difference between the heptapod languages and human language, as all human writing systems are based on the spoken language in some way.

===== Structure =====
Heptapod B does not contain a word divider (or punctuation altogether) and is not written in a linear fashion, such as in rows or spirals. Instead, sentences are formed by combining the individual semagrams of words to fit together. However, when heptapods write in Heptapod B, they do not write a single semagram and then alter it afterward to form a sentence; instead, semagrams begin with a single continuous line that participates in several clauses as the semagram becomes more complex. This means that one must know the layout of the entire sentence before writing the first stroke. This structure also means that individual graphemes become inseparable from the holistic glyph.

==== Grammar ====
Due to the semasiographic nature of Heptapod B, it contains an entirely separate grammar system to the spoken language, Heptapod A.

Visual inflections are used to show noun declension, including:

- varying a certain stroke’s curvature or thickness
- varying its undulation
- varying relative sizes of two root words
- varying relative distances or orientations of two or more root words

Heptapod B does not contain punctuation, as it does not represent spoken language—instead, the syntax of a sentence is determined by the way in which semagrams are combined. Sentences are created by combining two or more semagrams together, and the only indication of a paragraph or page of writing is the size of the semagram. The script demarcates the subject and object of a sentence by orienting the noun in a semagram relative to the verb. Subjects are shown by positioning the strokes for the noun and verb parallel to one another; for objects, these run perpendicular.

== Influences ==
=== Physics and heptapod perception of time ===
Heptapod B compares to human languages like Newtonian mechanics to Lagrangian mechanics. While the former is based on an understanding of the world in terms of cause and effect, that is, events ordered sequentially in time, the latter is a formulation of classical mechanics whose point of view is global and not sequential, as it describes the motion of a system like that which minimizes (or maximizes) the energy required; this is known as the least action principle. Chiang uses a teleological interpretation of least-action principles to suggest that heptapods view time holistically, and therefore can see both the present and future simultaneously.

In Heptapod A and B, this perception of time is largely present in their free-word order, especially in Heptapod A's conditional clauses, which are not reliant on stating the cause of an event before the consequence of an event. It can also be argued that heptapods' holistic perception of time also impacts the writing method used in Heptapod B, as the entire sentence must be known before writing the first stroke.

Chiang stated on an internet forum that his inspiration for including a teleological interpretation of least-action principles in "Story of Your Life" came from Variational Principles in Dynamics and Quantum Theory, which includes a quote from Max Planck suggesting that least-action principles could reasonably impact an individual's perception of time.

=== Sapir-Whorf hypothesis ===
In-universe, the thought processes of the novella's main character are altered after learning the Heptapod languages. This is an example of the Sapir-Whorf hypothesis and linguistic relativity, which suggests that the language an individual speaks impacts the way they think. The former of these is considered controversial by many linguists, but the theory serves a central role in the languages and the plotline.

== See also ==
- Astrolinguistics
- AUI
