= Conditions on Transformations =

1973 linguistics article by Noam Chomsky

"Conditions on Transformations" is an article on linguistics by Noam Chomsky, published in 1973. In it, Chomsky attempted to formulate constraints on transformational rules used in Transformational Generative Grammar (TGG), a syntactic theory that Chomsky first proposed in the 1950s. These constraints, or "conditions", helped decrease the number of possible generative grammars, with a goal to account for the process of language acquisition in children.

Chomsky's attempt to greatly constrain the power of transformational rules found a common ground with a new generation of generative linguists in Europe, as evidenced by the quote below:

In our opinion, generative linguistics acquired a new momentum in Europe after Chomsky's Conditions on Transformations (1973). This epoch-making paper shifted the interest of linguists from rather arbitrary rules to simple well-constrained rules operating under general conditions. A significant number of members of GLOW have found their common ground in the research programme that grew out of Conditions.

== Bibliography ==
- Chomsky, Noam (1973), "Conditions on Transformations", in Anderson and Kiparsky (ed.), A Festschrift for Morris Halle, New York: Holt, Rinehart & Winston, pp. 232–286
