= Sweetwater, Miami-Dade County, Florida =

City in the United States

Sweetwater, Florida
- City
- City of Sweetwater
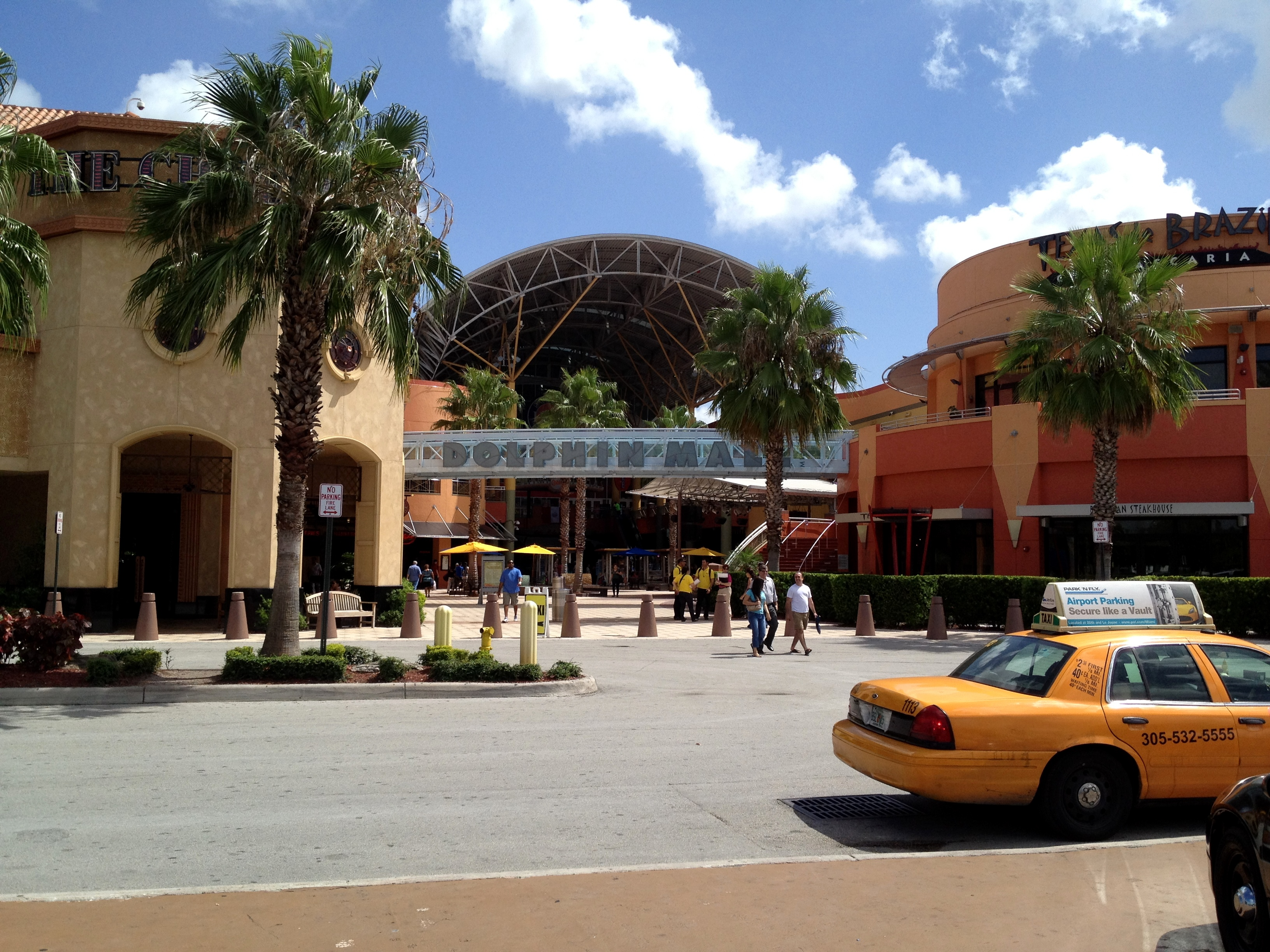
- Dolphin Mall, Sweetwater

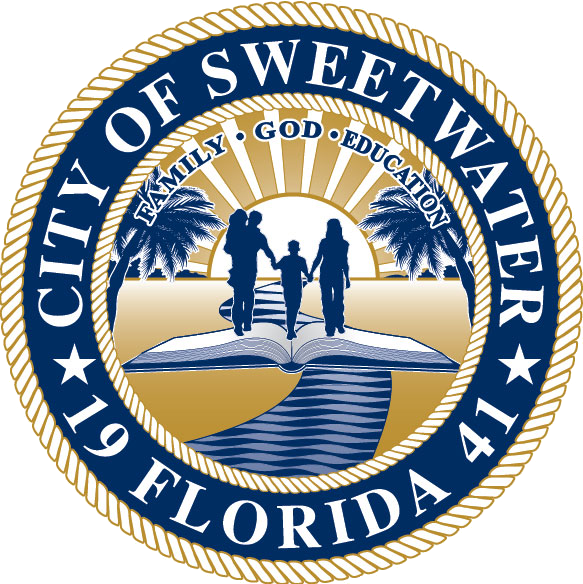
- Seal
- Nickname: Little Managua
- Motto: "Family, God, Education"
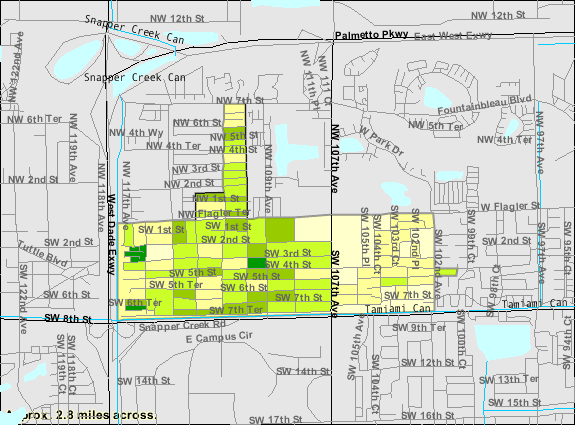
- U.S. Census Bureau map showing city limits prior to the 2010 annexation
- Coordinates: 25°47′10″N 80°22′42″W
- Country: United States
- State: Florida
- County: Miami-Dade
- Incorporated: October 10, 1941

Government
  - Type: Mayor-Commission

Area
  - Total: 4.23 sq mi (10.96 km^{2})
  - Land: 2.19 sq mi (5.68 km^{2})
  - Water: 0.11 sq mi (0.28 km^{2})
- Elevation: 10 ft (3.0 m)

Population (2020)
  - Total: 19,363
  - Density: 8,833.1/sq mi (3,410.48/km^{2})
- Time zone: UTC-5 (EST)
  - Summer (DST): UTC-4 (EDT)
- ZIP Codes: 33172, 33174 (Miami)
- Area codes: 305, 786, 645
- FIPS code: 12-70345
- GNIS feature ID: 2405554
- Website: cityofsweetwater.fl.gov

Sweetwater, informally known as "Little Managua", a reference to the longstanding Nicaraguan community within the city, is located in Miami-Dade County, Florida, United States. The city is part of the Miami metropolitan area of South Florida. As of the 2020 census, the population was 19,363, up from 13,499 in 2010.

== Geography ==
Sweetwater is located 12 miles (19 km) west of downtown Miami. It is bordered to the north and northeast by the city of Doral, to the southeast by Fontainebleau, to the south by Westchester, and to the west by Tamiami. The Ronald Reagan Turnpike forms the western edge of the city, and the Dolphin East-West Expressway crosses the center. U.S. Route 41 (Southwest 8th Street) follows the city's southern border.

According to the United States Census Bureau, Sweetwater has a total area of 4.3 square miles (11 km^{2}), of which 3.9 square miles (10 km^{2}) are land and 0.4 square miles (1.0 km^{2}), or 9.58%, are water. The city tripled in size in 2010 upon the annexation of additional areas, including where Dolphin Mall is located. The annexed area is roughly bounded by Northwest Seventh and 25th streets, 107th Avenue and Florida's Turnpike extension. The city on December 1, 2021, received approval from the county commission to annex 2 square miles of unincorporated land, bounded by NW 25th Street to the north, NW 12th Street to the south, Florida's Turnpike extension to the east and NW 137th Avenue to the west. It doubled the size of Sweetwater, and the area includes the headquarters of the Telemundo television network, as well as many companies and retail stores.

== History ==
The history of Sweetwater began during the Florida land boom of the 1920s when the Miami-Pittsburgh Land Company purchased land and laid out the original plat of "Sweetwater Groves". However, the 1926 Miami Hurricane and subsequent South Florida real estate "bust" put an abrupt end to the development venture.

In 1938, Clyde Andrews acquired most of the "Sweetwater Groves" tract and began to market lots. Among his buyers was a troupe of Russian dwarves seeking a place to retire after a career with the circus. They built several mini-scaled homes suited to their needs. For years, Sweetwater was known as the "midget" community.

In 1941, Sweetwater held a successful election for incorporation. The new town's first mayor was Joe Sanderlin, the dwarfs’ guardian and manager. By 1959, Sweetwater had attracted 500 residents and contained a town hall, church, grocery store, service station and 183 homes. It also had a two-man police force and a volunteer fire department. In 1970, Sweetwater was still a relatively small community of about 3,000 residents.

During the 1970s, several events dramatically changed the "sleepy little country town" of Sweetwater forever. These events included the establishment of Florida International University to the south of the city, the construction of the two major expressways to the north and west, and the discovery of Sweetwater by Dade County's Hispanic community. The growth and development which was precipitated by these occurrences caused Sweetwater to more than double in population and lead all other Dade cities in growth during the 1970s.

In March 1996, Sweetwater made national news as 69 animals were found dead on two properties in the city. Dade County police and the local zoologist blamed a large dog, while some residents blamed the killings on the chupacabra.

In the 2010s, there are only a few vacant lots left to develop. By 2010, the city's population had burgeoned to 13,499 persons, of which 95.5% were of Hispanic origin. The city now has a full-service police department, four parks, an elementary school, a county fire station, 4,353 residential housing units, 14 shopping centers, over 600 businesses, several churches and a bank. Sweetwater is also located near Miami International Mall. After a December 2010 vote, Dolphin Mall is now part of the city.

== Demographics ==
Historical population
| Census | Pop. | Note | %± |
|---|---|---|---|
| 1950 | 230 | | — |
| 1960 | 645 | | 180.4% |
| 1970 | 3,357 | | 420.5% |
| 1980 | 8,251 | | 145.8% |
| 1990 | 13,909 | | 68.6% |
| 2000 | 14,226 | | 2.3% |
| 2010 | 13,499 | | −5.1% |
| 2020 | 19,363 | | 43.4% |
U.S. Decennial Census

=== 2020 census ===
Sweetwater city, Florida – Racial composition
| Race (NH = Non-Hispanic) | 2020 | 2010 | 2000 | 1990 | 1980 |
|---|---|---|---|---|---|
| White alone (NH) | 3.7% (726) | 3.5% (475) | 6.2% (884) | 6.4% (890) | 18.2% (1,504) |
| Black alone (NH) | 0.7% (126) | 0.3% (44) | 0.1% (14) | 0.1% (9) | 0.4% (34) |
| American Indian alone (NH) | 0.1% (14) | 0% (3) | 0.1% (9) | 0% (0) | 0.2% (16) |
| Asian alone (NH) | 1% (192) | 0.5% (66) | 0.1% (19) | 0.4% (54) | 0.1% (11) |
| Pacific Islander alone (NH) | 0% (0) | 0% (0) | 0% (0) | | |
| Other race alone (NH) | 0.3% (61) | 0% (5) | 0% (2) | 0.1% (18) | 0.2% (14) |
| Multiracial (NH) | 0.5% (99) | 0.1% (12) | 0.3% (45) | — | — |
| Hispanic/Latino (any race) | 93.7% (18,145) | 95.5% (12,894) | 93.2% (13,253) | 93% (12,938) | 80.9% (6,672) |

As of the 2020 United States census, there were 19,363 people, 6,177 households, and 4,522 families residing in the city. Locals have long referred to Sweetwater as “Little Managua” in reference to long-standing Nicaraguan-American community within the city going back decades. A recognizable portion of the cities population hails from Nicaraguan descent. The most reported ancestries were:

- Cuban (53.3%)
- Nicaraguan (18.4%)
- Venezuelan (4.3%)
- Colombian (2.9%)
- Honduran (1.9%)
- Puerto Rican (1.2%)
- Dominican (1.1%)
- English (1%)
- Peruvian (1%)

=== 2010 census ===
Sweetwater Demographics
| 2010 Census | Sweetwater | Miami-Dade County | Florida |
|---|---|---|---|
| Total population | 13,499 | 2,496,435 | 18,801,310 |
| Population, percent change, 2000 to 2010 | –5.1% | +10.8% | +17.6% |
| Population density | 17,023.0/sq mi | 1,315.5/sq mi | 350.6/sq mi |
| White or Caucasian (including White Hispanic) | 92.4% | 73.8% | 75.0% |
| (Non-Hispanic White or Caucasian) | 3.5% | 15.4% | 57.9% |
| Black or African-American | 1.8% | 18.9% | 16.0% |
| Hispanic or Latino (of any race) | 95.5% | 65.0% | 22.5% |
| Asian | 0.5% | 1.5% | 2.4% |
| Native American or Native Alaskan | 0.2% | 0.2% | 0.4% |
| Pacific Islander or Native Hawaiian | 0.0% | 0.0% | 0.1% |
| Two or more races (Multiracial) | 2.1% | 2.4% | 2.5% |
| Some Other Race | 3.0% | 3.2% | 3.6% |

As of the 2010 United States census, there were 13,499 people, 4,434 households, and 3,536 families residing in the city.

As of 2013, Spanish was the mother tongue for 95.30% of the population, while English was spoken by 2.90% of all residents. Speakers of other Indo-European languages accounted for 0.30%, while the combined total of those who spoke an Asian language or Pacific Islander language made up 0.80%. The rest of the people who spoke any other languages in Sweetwater were at 0.70%. In total, 97.10% of the populace spoke something other than English as their first language.

=== 2000 census ===
In 2000, 39.3% had children under the age of 18 living with them, 57.7% were married couples living together, 19.1% had a female householder with no husband present, and 16.8% were non-families. 12.8% of all households were made up of individuals, and 7.3% had someone living alone who was 65 years of age or older. The average household size was 3.33 and the average family size was 3.55.

In 2000, the city population was spread out, with 24.2% under the age of 18, 9.6% from 18 to 24, 29.7% from 25 to 44, 23.0% from 45 to 64, and 13.6% who were 65 years of age or older. The median age was 36 years. For every 100 females, there were 92.7 males. For every 100 females age 18 and over, there were 87.9 males.

In 2000, the median income for a household in the city was $29,333, and the median income for a family was $30,823. Males had a median income of $22,378 versus $17,020 for females. The per capita income for the city was $11,098. About 08.4% of families and 11.1% of the population were below the poverty line, including 21.3% of those under age 18 and 21.7% of those age 65 or over.

== Economy ==
The Miami Herald is headquartered in Sweetwater.

== Education ==
Sweetwater is within the Miami-Dade County Public Schools. An estimated 13% of Sweetwater residents age 25 and older have a bachelor's or advanced college degree.

Elementary schools

- Sweetwater Elementary School serves residents for grades K–5, It is within the city limits.
- Carlos Finlay Elementary School also serves residents located within the school boundaries for grades K–5, it is located just south of the city limit.

Public middle schools

- Ruben Dario Middle School (1,305 students in 2006) serves residents for grades 6–8.

K-8

- Eugenia B. Thomas K-8 Center

Public high schools

- Miami Coral Park High School (4,421 students in 2006), serves Sweetwater for grades 9–12.
- G. Holmes Braddock High School (4,662 students in 2006) also serves Sweetwater for grades 9–12.

Universities

- The main campus of Florida International University is located just south of the city limit, and the Engineering campus is located to the east of the city limit.
- Keiser University is located in the northern area of the City directly behind Dolphin Mall.
- URBE University has its campus located in the northern area of the city.
- Universidad San Ignacio de Loyola has its US campus in the northern area of Sweetwater as well.

The Roman Catholic Archdiocese of Miami previously operated Our Lady of Divine Providence School in Fontainebleau CDP, in proximity to Sweetwater. It closed in 2009.
