= Robin Queen =

American linguist

- Occupations: Linguist; professor

Academic background
- Education: Georgetown University (B.S.); University of Texas at Austin (M.A., Ph.D.)

Robin M. Queen is an American sociolinguist and Professor of Linguistics at the University of Michigan. In 2010 she was named a Arthur F. Thurnau Professor and Professor of Linguistics, English Languages and Literatures, and Germanic Languages and Literatures. She served as the Chair of the Department of Linguistics at the University of Michigan from 2014-2021 and the Chair of the Department of Communication and Media from 2022-2024. In 2024 she was named the Sarah Thomason Collegiate Professor of Linguistics.

== Education and research ==
Queen earned a B.S. in Linguistics from Georgetown University in 1990, and she received both an M.A. (1993) and Ph.D. (1996) in Linguistics from the University of Texas at Austin. Her Ph.D. dissertation is titled, Intonation in contact: A study of Turkish–German bilingual intonation patterns.

Her work has primarily focused on the language use among lesbians, on language contact, especially among those of Turkish descent in Germany. She has also studied grammar peeves and how shepherds communicate with sheepdogs when moving livestock.

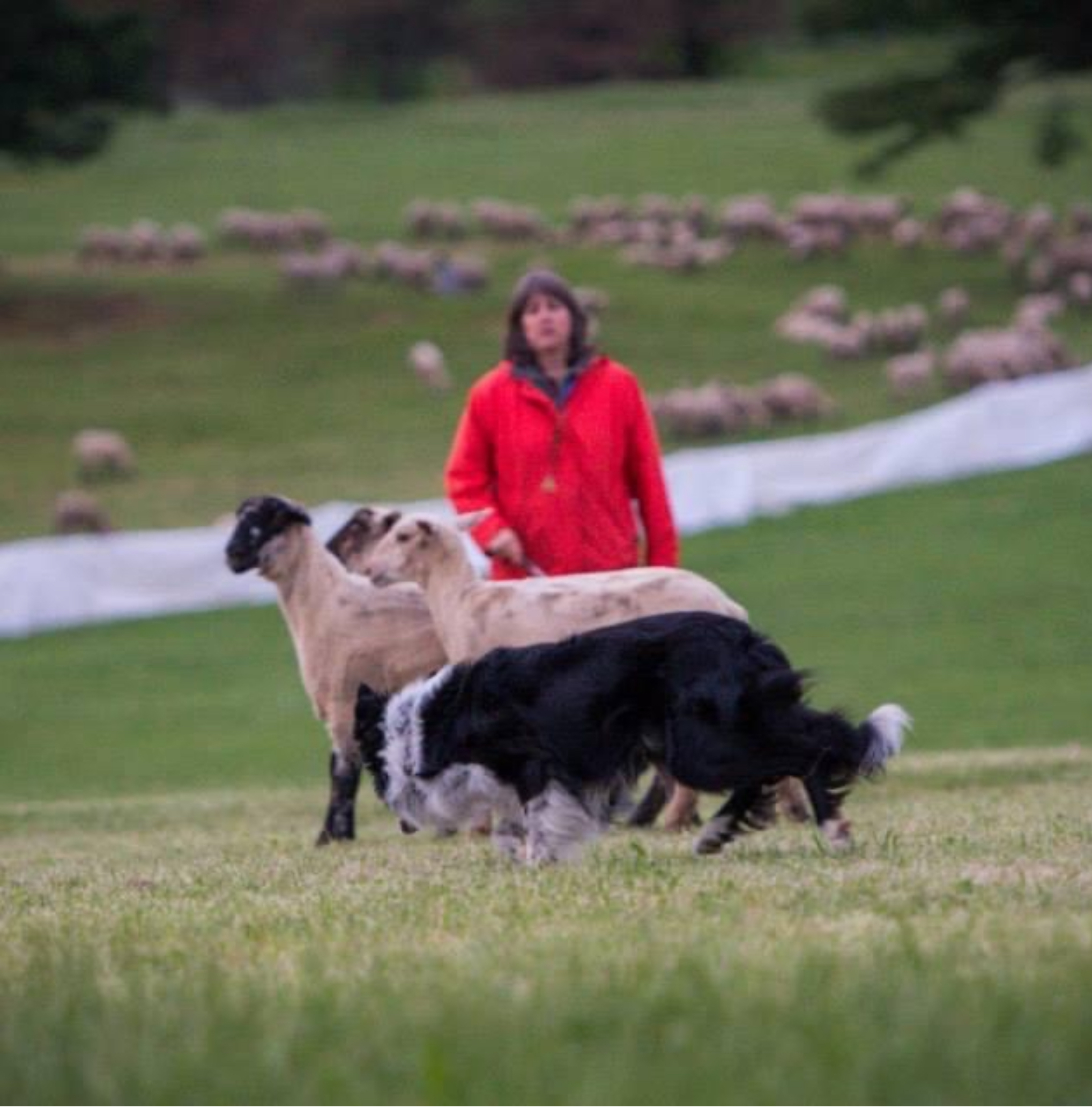

She published Vox Popular: The Surprising Life of Language with Wiley in 2015. Her work on shepherds and their border collies has been featured on Nova and in Wired.

== Honors ==
Queen was elected a Fellow of the Linguistic Society of America in 2015.

Queen served as the co-editor-in-chief with Anne Curzan of the Journal of English Linguistics from 2006 to 2012.
