= Asya Pereltsvaig =

Russian linguist

- Ася Перельцвайг
- Pereltsvaig in 2026
- Born: 1972 (age 53–54); Leningrad, USSR

Academic background
- Education: McGill University
- Thesis: On the Nature of Intra-Clausal Relations: A Study of Copular Sentences in Russian and Italian (2001)
- Doctoral advisor: Lisa Travis

Academic work
- Discipline: Linguist, Historian
- Institutions: Yale University; Cornell University; Stanford University

Asya Pereltsvaig (Russian: Ася Перельцвайг; born 1972 in Leningrad, USSR) is a Russian-American linguist, writer, and educator.

== Life ==
Pereltsvaig has a PhD in linguistics from McGill University in 2001, with a dissertation entitled, "On the nature of intra-clausal relations: a study of copular sentences in Russian and Italian." She has taught in Yale, Cornell, and Stanford universities, as well as the University of Utah Continuing Education program and several Osher Lifelong Learning Institutes. She has served as an academic coordinator for the Esperanto society, ESF. She is also an occasional lecturer at the Institute for the Study of Western Civilization.

Her research interests are theoretical syntax, cross-linguistic typology, Slavic linguistics, and historical linguistics. She is an independent scholar whose recent books include: The Indo-European Controversy: Facts and Fallacies in Historical Linguistics (with Martin Lewis), Languages of the World: An Introduction (4th Edition) and Language Rules! Secrets of a Uniquely Human Ability, all published by Cambridge University Press. She has also published research articles in leading linguistics journals, such as Lingua, Natural Language and Linguistic Theory, and Language and Linguistics Compass.

Her more recent teaching and writing focuses on Russian history, culture, and film. Her most recent book is a historical fiction novel, Murder in Petrograd, published by Historium Press.

== Selected works ==
- Pereltsvaig, Asya (May 2006). "Small Nominals". Natural Language & Linguistic Theory. 24 (2): 433–500. doi:10.1007/s11049-005-3820-z. ISSN 0167-806X.
- Pereltsvaig, Asya (August 2006). "Head movement in Hebrew nominals: A reply to Shlonsky". Lingua. 116 (8): A1–A40. doi:10.1016/j.lingua.2005.11.001.
- Pereltsvaig, Asya (March 2013). "Noun Phrase Structure in Article-less Slavic Languages: DP or not DP?". Language and Linguistics Compass. 7 (3): 201–219. doi:10.1111/lnc3.12014. ISSN 1749-818X.
- Pereltsvaig, Asya; Lewis, Martin (2017). The Indo-European controversy: facts and fallacies in historical linguistics (First paperback ed.). Cambridge: Cambridge University Press. ISBN 978-1-107-66538-5.
- Pereltsvaig, Asya (2023). Languages of the world: An Introduction (Fourth ed.). Cambridge, United Kingdom; New York, NY: Cambridge University Press. ISBN 9781009338660.
