= Kenesei =

Kenesei is a Hungarian surname. Notable people with the surname include:

- István Kenesei (born 1947), Hungarian linguist
- Krisztián Kenesei (born 1977), Hungarian footballer
- Zoltán Kenesei (born 1972), Hungarian footballer
