= Diane Massam =

Canadian linguist

Academic background
- Education: Massachusetts Institute of Technology
- Doctoral advisor: Noam Chomsky

Academic work
- Discipline: Linguistics
- Sub-discipline: Syntax of Niuean
- Institutions: University of Toronto

Diane Massam is a Canadian linguist and professor emerita at the University of Toronto.

== Education and research ==
She earned her PhD in linguistics under Noam Chomsky in 1985 from the Massachusetts Institute of Technology. She held a position in the Department of Linguistics at the University of Toronto from 1989 until her retirement in 2017, when she became professor emerita.

Massam specializes in the syntax of Niuean, an Austronesian language spoken in the South Pacific country of Niue. She developed an analysis of a type of verb plus noun compounding called pseudo-incorporation which has opened a window to analyze similar phenomena in other languages. Her analysis also proposed a novel way of understanding the relationship between a subject and its predicate.

== Honors ==
She was a keynote speaker at the 21st annual meeting of the Austronesian Formal Linguistics Association (AFLA) in 2014.

She has served on the Advisory Board of the Canadian Journal of Linguistics, and on the Editorial Board of the journal Linguistic Inquiry.

Massam was appointed Vice-President of the Canadian Linguistic Association in 2015. Upon completion of her two-year term in this position she served as President of the CLA from 2017 to 2019.

== Publications ==
- Massam, D. 2020. Niuean: Predicates and Arguments in an Isolating Language. (Oxford Studies of Endangered Languages). Oxford University Press.
- Massam, D. 2017. Extra be: The syntax of shared shell-noun constructions in English. Language 93.1: 121–152.
- Massam, D. (Ed.) 2012. Count and Mass Across Languages (Oxford Studies in Theoretical Linguistics 42). Oxford University Press.
- Massam, D., J. Lee and N. Rolle. 2006. "Still a Preposition: The Category of ko," Te Reo: Journal of the Linguistic Society of New Zealand 49:3-38.
- Massam, D., Starks and O. Ikiua. 2006. "On the Edge of Grammar: Discourse Particles in Niuean," Oceanic Linguistics 45.1:191-205.
- Massam D., M. Abdolhosseini and K. Oda. 2002. "Number and Events: Verbal Reduplication in Niuean" Oceanic Linguistics 41.2:475-492.
- Massam D. 2001. "Pseudo Noun Incorporation in Niuean", Natural Language and Linguistic Theory 19:1:153-197.
- Massam D. 2000. VSO and VOS: Aspects of Niuean word order," The syntax of verb initial languages.
- Massam D. and W. Sperlich. 2000. "Possession in Niuean"in Steven Fischer, ed. Possessive Markers in Central Pacific Languages: Thematic volume of Language Typology and Universals (Sprachtypologie und Universalienforschung). pp. 281-292.
- Massam, D. 1999. "Thing-is Constructions: The thing is, is what's the right analysis" English Language and Linguistics 3.2:335-352.
- S. Bejar and D. Massam. 1999. "Multiple Case Checking" Syntax: A Journal of Theoretical, Experimental and Interdisciplinary Research, 2.2:65-79. 1999.
- Massam, D. 1998. "Instrumental aki and the Nature of Niuean Transitivity" Oceanic Linguistics: 37.1:12-28.
- Ghomeshi, J. and D. Massam. 1994, "Lexical/Syntactic Relations Without Projection" Linguistic Analysis 24.3-4:175-217.
- Massam, D. 1985. "Case theory and the projection principle."
- Levin, J. and D. Massam. 1985. "Surface ergativity: Case/theta relations reexamined," Proceedings of NELS.
