= Dolphin Mall =

Shopping mall in Miami-Dade County, Florida, U.S.

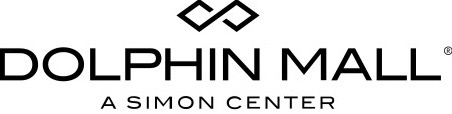

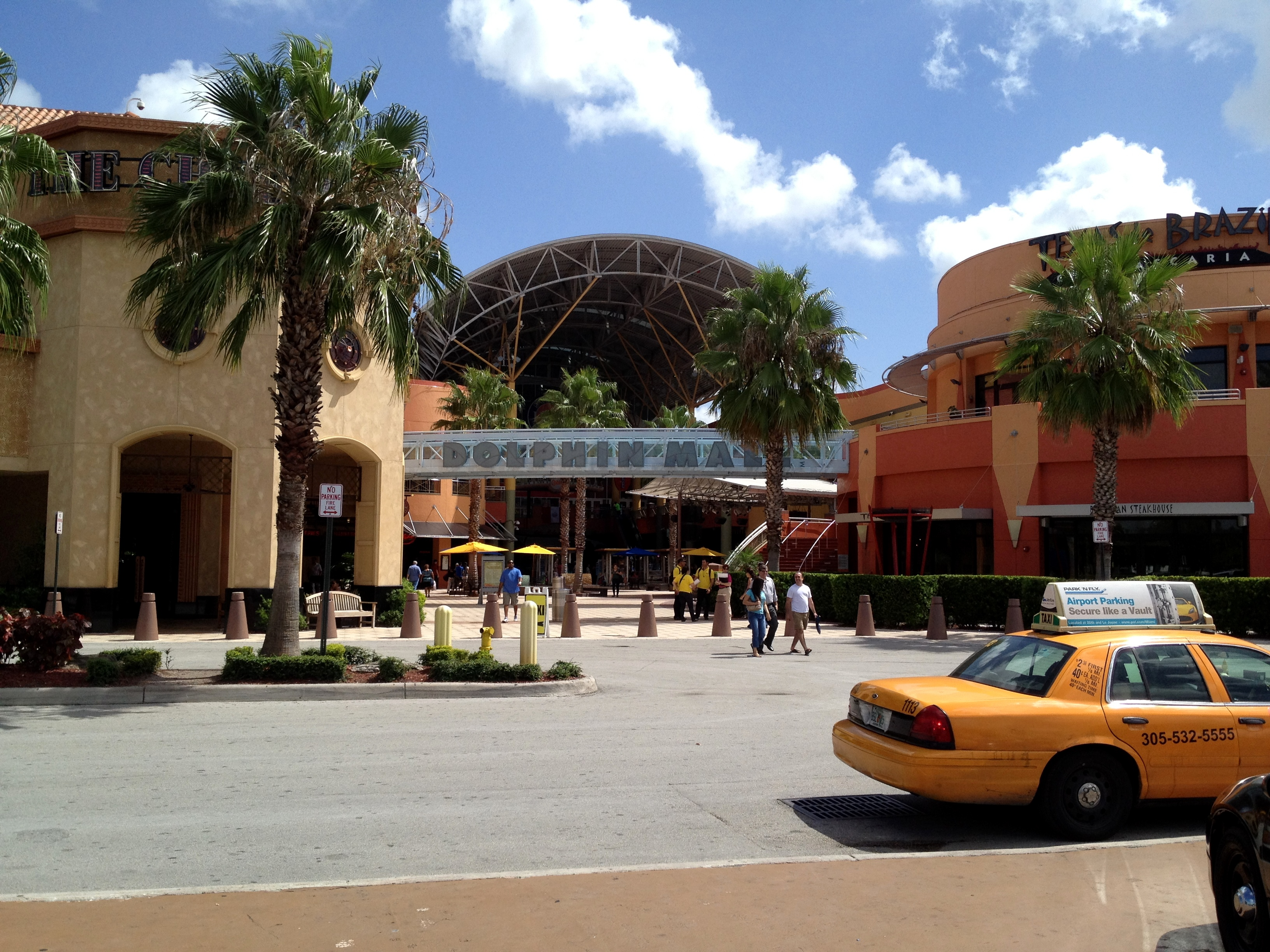
- Exterior view (August 2013)
- Location: Sweetwater, Miami-Dade County, Florida, U.S.
- Coordinates: 25.7876°N 80.3806°W
- Address: 11401 NW 12th St, Miami, FL 33172
- Opened: March 1, 2001; 25 years ago
- Developer: Taubman Centers and Swerdlow Real Estate
- Manager: The Mills: A Simon Company
- Owner: Simon Property Group
- Architect: Beame Architectural Partnership
- Num. of stores: 240+
- Num. of anchor tenants: 15
- Floor area: 1,400,000 square feet (130,000 m^{2})
- Floors: 2
- Parking: Parking lot with 7,800 free spaces
- Website: www.simon.com/mall/dolphin-mall

Dolphin Mall is a super-regional outlet mall in Sweetwater, Florida, United States, (Note: While the mall has a Miami address and used "Miami" in its name, it is completely within the city limits of Sweetwater.) part of the Miami metropolitan area. Opened in early 2001, it consists of over 1,400,000 square feet (130,000 m^{2}) of retail space.

The mall is owned and managed by Simon Property Group. The previous owners and operate were Taubman Realty Group (formerly branded as Taubman Centers), co-developer for the original mall alongside Swerdlow Real Estate. Simon acquired an 80% interest in Taubman in February 2020, and later acquired the remaining shares in November 2025. Dolphin Mall is a direct competitor to Sawgrass Mills in Broward County.

== History ==
=== 1997–2001: Planning and construction ===
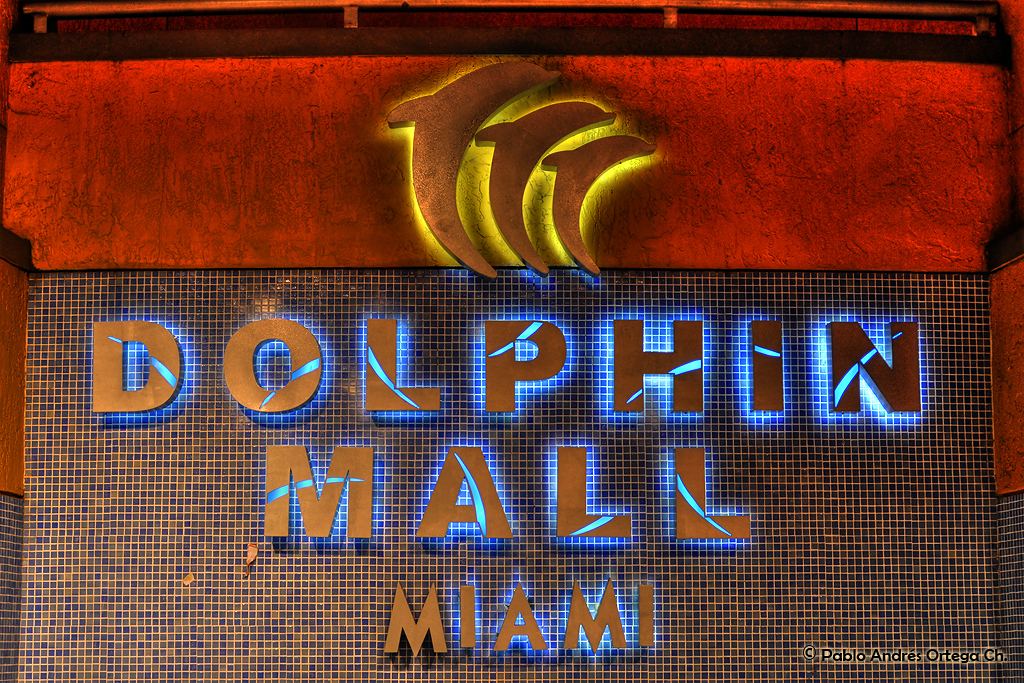
Original logo (2001–2025)

Swerdlow Real Estate of Hollywood, Florida, first announced plans to develop Dolphin Mall in March 1997 when the company acquired near the intersection of the Homestead Extension of Florida's Turnpike (SR 821) and the Dolphin Expressway (SR 836) in what was then unincorporated Dade County, Florida. Their plans called for a 1,400,000-square-foot (130,000 m^{2}) retail shopping mall with outlet stores. The mall was considered by developers and retail analysts to be a competitor of Sawgrass Mills, another large outlet mall in Sunrise, Florida, which opened in October 1990. Construction began in June 1998, by which point Swerdlow had confirmed a number of tenants. Among these were a movie theater and Dave & Buster's, along with Burlington Coat Factory, Saks Off 5th, Marshalls, and Oshman's Sporting Goods. By May 1999, Swerdlow announced plans to form a joint venture with Taubman Centers, Inc. of Bloomfield Hills, Michigan, to assist in development of the mall.

The mall was to feature over 150 inline stores. Overall, the mall occupied 120 acres (49 ha) of space and had 7,800 parking spaces. Beame Architectural Partnership was the architect. Building costs were estimated at $290,000,000. Because of its proximity to Miami International Airport and Miami's Latin American population, developers sought to include amenities suitable for Latin Americans and travelers. These included hiring staffers who speak Spanish, Latin American-themed decor within the mall, unisex bathrooms, and storage lockers big enough to hold luggage. In addition, Dolphin Mall featured shuttle service to and from the airport. To promote the mall, Miami's convention and visitors' bureau hired Lucia Plazas-Champ to represent the mall's opening and promote it at various international capitals. Additionally, the mall featured different decor in each wing, each referred to by a different Spanish name: ramblas ("the walk"), playa ("beach"), and moda ("fashion"). The mall consisted mostly of one story except for the ramblas area, which featured the movie theater and Dave & Buster's on a second level overlooking the rest of the mall. The playa section featured beach-styled decor, with storefronts meant to resemble cabanas and a focus on sporting goods and similar apparel; moda featured white walls and terrazzo, with mostly fashion-oriented tenants; and ramblas had earth-toned storefronts consisting mainly of gift shops, restaurants, and entertainment options.

=== 2001–2002: Grand opening and early years ===
Dolphin Mall opened for business on March 1, 2001. Opening day festivities included a parade and a New Orleans jazz band. Shoppers could also include souvenirs for the first 10,000 guests, and prize drawings to win shopping sprees at both the mall proper and individual retailers. Also available were two piñatas for guests to break open and discover numbered coins which they could redeem for prizes. Among the stores open for business on opening day were FYE (For Your Entertainment), Linens 'n Things, Old Navy, Marshalls, and Burlington Coat Factory.

At opening, business was slow at Dolphin Mall for a number of factors. Tenants of the mall noted that on opening day, several tenants such as the food court and theater were not yet open for business. Additionally, Taubman's construction budget for the mall was increased due to a number of repairs needed before the mall could open, including fire sprinklers and roofing. By the time the theater had opened at mid-year, mall tenants noted an increase in traffic, and Taubman signed on about 75 more stores to increase occupancy. Among these were Victoria's Secret, Borders Books & Music, TGI Fridays, and Limited Too. Taubman assumed Swerdlow's 50% share of the mall in October 2002, thus taking over complete ownership.

=== 2005–present: Expansions and acquisitions ===
Expansion plans announced in December 2005 added Bass Pro Shops to the mall, as well as a Courtyard by Marriott hotel on the periphery. Additionally, a number of condominiums were developed around the mall at this point.

In January 2010, Bloomingdale's - The Outlet Store announced that it would open its first location in Florida at the mall. At the time of the mall's 10th anniversary in March 2011, research by Taubman Centers reported it to be one of the top 20 performing malls in the United States, which the company attributed to strong tourism and a different tenant mix than Sawgrass Mills. Additionally, while Sawgrass Mills tended to have more upscale stores such as Donna Karan, Taubman sought more lower-cost tenants at Dolphin Mall as a means of attracting tourists and families. IKEA announced plans in 2013 to build its second South Florida store adjacent to the mall.

Another expansion began in November 2014, which added a parking garage and five restaurants to the front of the mall. According to a 2014 study, the most popular non-American demographics of Dolphin Mall were Colombians and Brazilians. This book noted that it was common for Colombians to shop at malls in the United States because they often had drastically lower prices than found at malls in Colombia. Dolphin Mall developed its own smartphone app in 2016, which helps assist shoppers in navigating malls and finding deals at individual stores. Also, in July 2016, Sports Authority (which acquired Oshman's) closed its location at the mall, as the company went out of business after filing for Chapter 7 bankruptcy in May of that year (previously Chapter 11 in March) and sold the location back to Taubman Centers.

In February 2020, Simon Property Group, which also owns Sawgrass Mills, acquired an 80% stake in Taubman for $3.6 billion, placing their entire mall portfolio, including Dolphin Mall, under their ownership and management. The mall was placed under Simon's The Mills subsidiary. (Note: However, Dolphin Mall has nothing to do with the Mills Corporation despite being a direct competitor to Sawgrass Mills.) During the COVID-19 pandemic, Dolphin Mall was temporarily closed to the public in March 2020, alongside other Simon properties. After it reopened in May of that year, areas such as its children's play place were closed to the public, and areas of the mall were cleaned and disinfected daily.

An Ashley Stewart pop-up opened in early October 2021. Windsor Fashions debuted at the mall in July 2022. By July 30, 2026, Dolphin Mall featured the Eko Padel & Pickle indoor sports and cafe venue, alongside Primark, a renovated CMX Cinemas Dolphin 19 & IMAX cinema, JD Sports, Sephora, Miami-Dade County's first LandShark Bar & Grill, Miniso, and Luli Fama. Fabletics and Pop Mart would follow in August of that year.

== Vivo! Plaza ==
On December 20, 2021, Simon subsidiary Taubman Realty Group and Baltimore, Maryland-based The Cordish Companies announced a partnership agreement to develop a 62,000-square-foot (5,800 m^{2}) entertainment district at Dolphin Mall, split in 30,000 square feet (2,800 m^{2}) of outdoor space, and 32,000 square feet (3,000 m^{2}) of indoor space.

By the spring of 2023, the project was rebranded as Vivo!, and would be anchored by Sports & Social, and PBR Miami. The venue opened on June 23 of that year, with Blue Moon Garden Bar, Crush Bar, Sergio's Cuban American Kitchen, a free concert by Daya, and the 30,000–square–feet open-air Vivo! Plaza.

== Impact ==
In the book A World Made for Money: Economy, Geography, and the Way We Live Today, Bret Wallach cites the success of Dolphin Mall as an example of shopping malls adapting to shoppers' demands by focusing on outlet stores. The book cited both it and Great Lakes Crossing Outlets in Auburn Hills, Michigan, as examples of Taubman having success with the outlet mall format instead of the conventional shopping malls for which they were previously known.

== See also ==
- Arundel Mills, which has Live! Casino & Hotel, also developed jointly by Cordish and Simon
- Bayside Marketplace in Greater Downtown Miami
- CrossIron Mills, which has Century Downs Racetrack and Casino
- Fourth Street Live! in Louisville, Kentucky
