= Austronesian Formal Linguistics Association =

Learned society

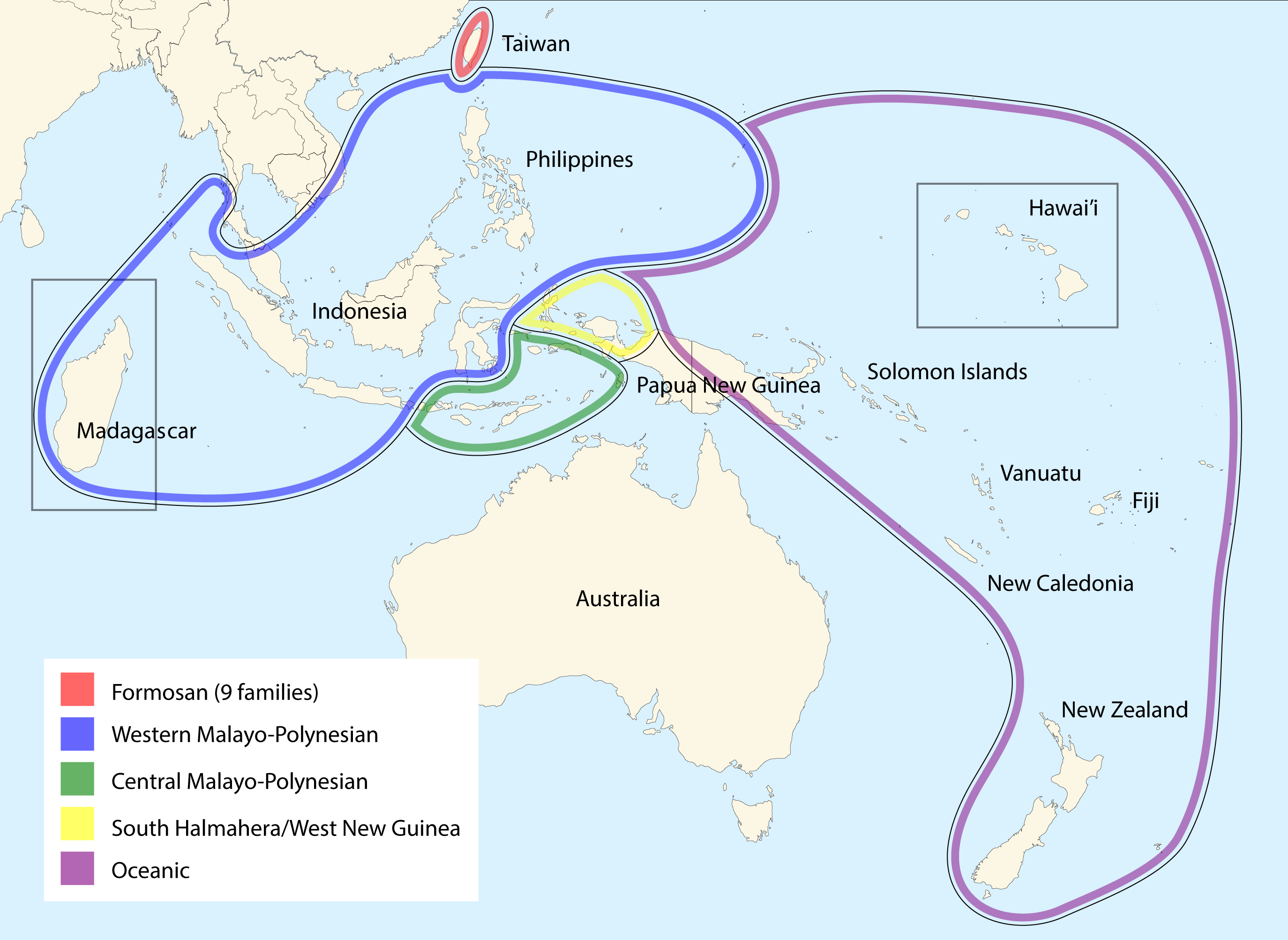
Distribution of Austronesian languages and primary subdivisions

The Austronesian Formal Linguistics Association (AFLA) is a learned society that hosts forums for collaborative research on Austronesian languages. Founded in 1994 at the University of Toronto, AFLA is now administered from the University of Western Ontario. Conferences are held annually at a multitude of institutes across the globe, including Tokyo University of Foreign Studies (AFLA 2016), Vrije Universiteit Amsterdam (AFLA 2000), and Academia Sinica (AFLA 2018) located in Taipei, Taiwan. The most recent 2019 conference was held in its home administration at the University of Western Ontario. Due to the COVID-19 pandemic, the AFLA 2020 conference was postponed and tentatively rescheduled for August 20 at the National University of Singapore.

== Founders ==
- Anna Maclachlan

author of "Optimality and three western Austronesian case systems" and 13 other research papers on Austronesian language

- Diane Massam

professor in the department of Linguistics at the University of Toronto where she is involved in many research efforts

- Richard McGinn

accomplished linguist who taught a numerous universities including Ohio University. McGinn died at the age of 78

- Barry Miller

attended York University in Toronto an co-founded AFLA with Massam

- Lisa Travis

currently a professor of Linguistics at McGill University

== See also ==
- List of Austronesian languages
