= Jan Koster =

Dutch linguist (born 1945)

Jan Koster (born 8 July 1945 in Delft) is a Dutch linguist and professor emeritus at the University of Groningen.

Koster studied at the University of Amsterdam, where, after being a visiting scientist at MIT (Cambridge, Massachusetts, 1976), he received his PhD in 1978. Before being appointed full professor and chair of the linguistics department at Groningen (in 1985), Koster was assistant professor at the University of Amsterdam and Utrecht University, and associate professor at Tilburg University.

With Henk van Riemsdijk and Jean-Roger Vergnaud, Koster was one of the founders of GLOW, the major European organization of generative linguistics. He was co-founder and editor of The Linguistic Review and was until his retirement co-editor (with van Riemsdijk and Harry van der Hulst) of Studies in Generative Grammar (published by Mouton de Gruyter). He specializes in theoretical syntax and the philosophy and history of linguistics. He made notable contributions to the theories of word order, locality and anaphora.

== Selected publications ==
- Locality Principles in Syntax (1978). Dordrecht: Foris.
- Domains and Dynasties (1987). Dordrecht: Foris.
- (With E. Reuland, Eds.) Long-Distance Anaphora (1991). Cambridge: Cambridge University Press.
