= Jason Kandybowicz =

American linguist (born 1978)

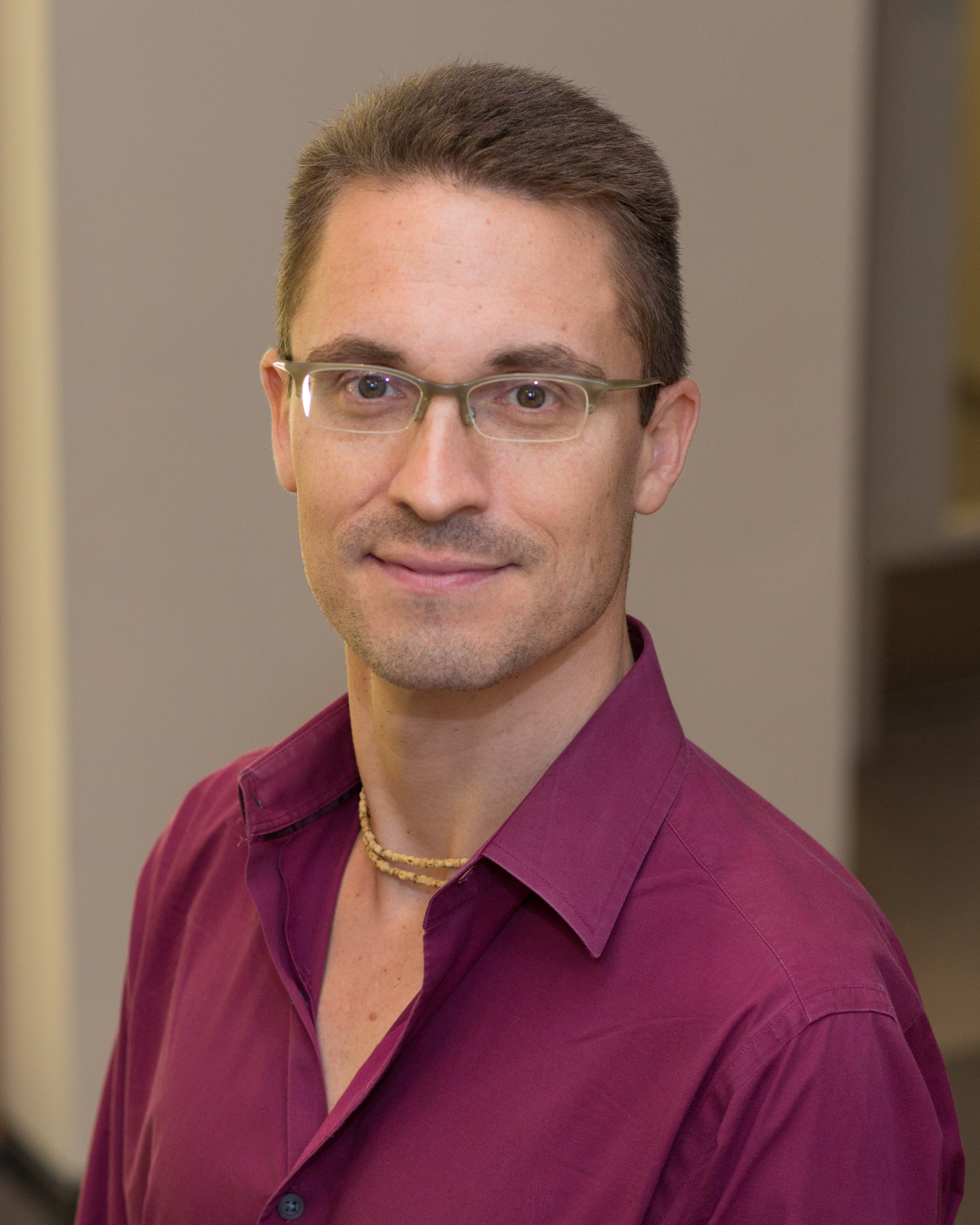
- Born: 1978 (age 47–48)
- Education: UCLA, Rutgers University
- Scientific career
- Fields: Syntax, generative grammar, fieldwork
- Workplaces: CUNY Graduate Center, University of Kansas, University of Texas at Arlington, Swarthmore College
- Doctoral advisor: Hilda Koopman

Jason Kandybowicz (born 1978) is an American linguist, since 2022 Full Professor of Linguistics at The CUNY Graduate Center. He received his Ph.D. from University of California, Los Angeles in 2006 as an advisee of Hilda Koopman. Kandybowicz has researched several endangered and understudied West African languages, including Nupe, Krachi, Ikpana and Asante Twi. Working within the generative grammar framework, he has written several important books and scientific journal articles about Niger-Congo languages and the syntax-phonology interface. He has made a number of media appearances, including interviews for podcasts and the British Broadcasting Company

== Selected bibliography ==
=== Books ===
- (2023) Ikpana Interrogatives (with Bertille Baron, Philip T. Duncan, and Hironori Katsuda)
- (2020) Anti-contiguity: A Theory of Wh- Prosody
- (2018) African Linguistics on the Prairie (with Travis Major, Philip T. Duncan, and Harold Torrence)
- (2017) Africa's Endangered Languages: Documentary and Theoretical Approaches (with Harold Torrence)
- (2008) The Grammar of Repetition: Nupe Grammar at the Syntax-Phonology Interface

=== Articles ===
- (2026) Absence of Relative Clause Islands in Adara. Languages 11.2 (27): pages 1–10.
- (2025) Perfect Island Repair by Ellipsis in Nupe: Against Aspectual Mismatch (with Gesoel Mendes). Snippets 48: pages 10–12.
- (2024) Absence of Clausal Islands in Shupamem (with Hagay Schurr, Abdoulaye Laziz Nchare, Tysean Bucknor, Xiaomeng Ma, Magdalena Markowska, and Armando Tapia). Languages 9.1 (7): pages 1–35.
- (2023) Salvation by Deletion in Nupe (with Gesoel Mendes). Linguistic Inquiry 54: pages 299–325.
- (2023) Integrated Non-restrictive Relative Clauses in Shupamem (with Abdoulaye Laziz Nchare). Natural Language and Linguistic Theory 41: pages 655–677.
- (2022) Sluicing and Focus Related Particles in Brazilian Portuguese and Nupe (with Gesoel Mendes). Revista Linguíʃtica 18: pages 39–61.
- (2022) Managing Data for Theoretical Syntactic Study of a Language (with Philip T. Duncan, Harold Torrence, and Travis Major). In Andrea L. Berez-Kroeker, Bradley McDonnell, Eve Koller, and Lauren Collister (eds.) The Open Handbook of Linguistic Data Management, pages 523–530. MIT Press.
- (2021) Predicate Fronting with Verb Doubling in Krachi: A Parallel Chains Analysis (with Harold Torrence). In Vera Lee-Schoenfeld and Dennis Ott (eds.) Parameters of Predicate Fronting: Cross-linguistic Explorations of V(P)-initial Clauses, pp. 131–156. Oxford University Press.
- (2021) Documenting the Ikpana Interrogative System (with Bertille Baron, Philip T. Duncan, and Hironori Katsuda). Journal of African Languages and Linguistics 42: pages 63–100.
- (2017) On Prosodic Variation and the Distribution of Wh- In-situ. Linguistic Variation 17: pages 111–148.
- (2017) The Role of Theory in Documentation: Intervention Effects and Missing Gaps in the Krachi Documentation Record (with Harold Torrence). In Jason Kandybowicz and Harold Torrence (eds.) Africa's Endangered Languages: Documentary and Theoretical Approaches, pages 187–205. Oxford University Press.
- (2015) Wh- Question Formation in Krachi (with Harold Torrence). Journal of African Languages and Linguistics 36: pages 253–285.
- (2015) On Prosodic Vacuity and Verbal Resumption in Asante Twi. Linguistic Inquiry 46: pages 243–272.
- (2013) Ways of Emphatic Scope Taking: from Emphatic Assertion in Nupe to the Grammar of Emphasis. Lingua 128: pages 51–71.
- (2011) How Why is Different: Wh- In-situ in Krachi (with Harold Torrence). Snippets 23: pages 5–6.
- (2009) Embracing Edges: Syntactic and Phono-syntactic Edge Sensitivity in Nupe. Natural Language and Linguistic Theory 27: pages 305–344.
- (2007) On Fusion and Multiple Copy Spell-Out: The Case of Verbal Repetition. In Norbert Corver and Jairo Nunes (eds.) The Copy Theory of Movement, pages 119–150. John Benjamins Publishing Company.
- (2008) Externalization and Emergence: On the Status of Parameters in the Minimalist Program. Biolinguistics 3: pages 94–99.
- (2003) On Directionality and the Structure of the Verb Phrase: Evidence from Nupe (with Mark C. Baker). Syntax 6: pages 115–155.
