= Arrival (film) =

2016 American science fiction drama film

- Theatrical release poster
- Directed by: Denis Villeneuve
- Screenplay by: Eric Heisserer
- Based on: "Story of Your Life" by Ted Chiang
- Produced by: Shawn Levy; Dan Levine; Aaron Ryder; David Linde
- Starring: Amy Adams; Jeremy Renner; Forest Whitaker; Michael Stuhlbarg; Tzi Ma
- Cinematography: Bradford Young
- Edited by: Joe Walker
- Music by: Jóhann Jóhannsson
- Production companies: FilmNation Entertainment; Lava Bear Films; 21 Laps Entertainment
- Distributed by: Paramount Pictures (United States, Canada and China); Entertainment One Films (United Kingdom); Roadshow Entertainment (Australia); Sony Pictures Releasing International (via Stage 6 Films) (Certain European and East Asian Territories excluding China)
- Release dates: September 1, 2016 (Venice); November 11, 2016 (United States)
- Running time: 116 minutes
- Country: United States
- Language: English
- Budget: $47 million
- Box office: $213.6 million

Arrival is a 2016 American science fiction drama film directed by Denis Villeneuve and written by Eric Heisserer, based on the 1998 novella "Story of Your Life" by Ted Chiang. The film stars Amy Adams as Louise Banks, a linguist engaged by the United States Army to discover how to communicate with extraterrestrials who have arrived on Earth, before tensions lead to war. Jeremy Renner, Forest Whitaker, and Michael Stuhlbarg appear in supporting roles.

Arrival had its world premiere at the Venice Film Festival on September 1, 2016, and was released theatrically in the United States by Paramount Pictures on November 11, 2016. It grossed $213 million worldwide and received widespread acclaim with praise directed towards Adams's performance, Villeneuve's direction, and the exploration of communication with extraterrestrial intelligence. Considered one of the best films of 2016, Arrival appeared on numerous critics' year-end lists and was selected by the American Film Institute as one of ten "Movies of the Year".

It received eight nominations at the 89th Academy Awards, including Best Picture, Best Director, Best Cinematography, and Best Adapted Screenplay, winning Best Sound Editing. For her performance, Adams received nominations for a BAFTA, SAG, Critics' Choice; at the 74th Golden Globe Awards, Adams was nominated for the Golden Globe Award for Best Actress and Jóhann Jóhannsson was nominated for the Golden Globe Award for Best Original Score. The film was awarded the Ray Bradbury Award for Outstanding Dramatic Presentation and the Hugo Award for Best Dramatic Presentation in 2017. The score by Jóhannsson was nominated for Best Score Soundtrack for Visual Media at the 60th Grammy Awards.

== Plot ==
Linguist Louise Banks's daughter Hannah dies at the age of twelve from an incurable illness.

Twelve extraterrestrial spacecraft hover over various locations around the Earth. In the ensuing widespread panic, affected nations send military and scientific experts to monitor and study them. In the United States, US Army Colonel Weber recruits Banks and physicist Ian Donnelly to study the craft above Montana. On board, Banks and Donnelly make contact with two cephalopod-like, seven-limbed aliens, whom they call "heptapods"; Donnelly nicknames them Abbott and Costello. Banks and Donnelly research the complex written language of the heptapods, consisting of phrases written with logograms, and share the results with other nations. As Banks studies the language, she starts to have flashback-like visions of her daughter.

When Banks is able to establish sufficient shared vocabulary to ask why the heptapods have come, they answer with a statement that could be translated as "offer weapon". China interprets this as "use weapon", prompting them to break off communications, and other nations follow. Banks argues that the symbol interpreted as "weapon" can be more abstractly related to the concepts of "means" or "tool"; China's translation likely results from interacting with the heptapods using mahjong, a highly competitive game. Meanwhile, the Russian team receives a message that they translate as "there is no time," which they interpret as a possible threat.

Rogue soldiers plant a bomb in the Montana craft. Unaware, Banks and Donnelly reenter the alien vessel, and the aliens give them a more complex message. Just before the bomb explodes, one of the aliens ejects Donnelly and Banks from the vessel, knocking them unconscious. When they wake, the heptapod craft has moved beyond reach and the US military is preparing to evacuate in case of retaliation.

General Shang of China issues an ultimatum to the alien craft in China, demanding that it leave within 24 hours. Russia, Pakistan, and Sudan follow suit; communications between the international research teams are terminated as worldwide panic sets in.

Donnelly discovers that the symbol for time is present throughout the message and that the writing occupies exactly one-twelfth of the 3D space into which it is projected. Banks suggests that the full message is split between the twelve craft and that the heptapods want all the nations to collaborate in order to decipher it.

Banks goes alone to the Montana craft, which sends down a transport pod. Abbott has been mortally injured as a result of the explosion. Costello explains that they have come to help humanity, because in 3,000 years' time they will need humanity's help in return. Banks realizes the "weapon" is their language. Learning the language alters humans' linear perception of time, allowing them to experience memories of future events. Banks's visions of her daughter are revealed to be premonitions; her daughter will not be born until sometime in the future.

Banks returns to the camp as it is being evacuated and tells Donnelly that the aliens' language is the "tool" that was meant by the word "weapon". She experiences a premonition of a United Nations event celebrating global unity achieved by finally deciphering the heptapods' language. At the event, General Shang thanks Banks for persuading him to stop the attack when she called his private number and recited his wife's dying words. (Note: In the film, this line is spoken in Mandarin without English subtitles. According to screenwriter Eric Heisserer, it translates to "War doesn't make winners, only widows".) He then shows her his private number and whispers his wife's words into her ear.

In the present, Banks takes CIA agent Halpern's satellite phone from a table and calls Shang's private number to recite the words. The Chinese announce that they are standing down and releasing their twelfth of the message. The other countries follow suit, and the twelve spacecraft depart.

From what she has learned, Banks writes and publishes a book called The Universal Language, a guide to the heptapod language, which will eventually teach humanity to perceive time the same way as the heptapods.

During the evacuation, Donnelly expresses his love for Banks. They talk about their life choices and whether he would change them if he could see his life from beginning to end. Banks knows that she will agree to have a child with him despite knowing their fate: that Hannah will die from an incurable disease and that Donnelly will leave them both as a result of her revealing that she knew this. As they embrace, Banks reminisces about the last time Donnelly will hug her.

== Cast ==
- Amy Adams as Louise Banks, a linguist.
- Jeremy Renner as Ian Donnelly, a theoretical physicist.
- Forest Whitaker as Colonel Weber, commander of the US forces garrisoned at the Montana site.
- Michael Stuhlbarg as Agent Halpern, CIA liaison officer to the Montana site.
- Mark O'Brien as Captain Marks
- Tzi Ma as General Shang, People’s Liberation Army
- Julia Scarlett Dan as twelve-year-old Hannah
  - Abigail Pniowsky as eight-year-old Hannah
  - Jadyn Malone as six-year-old Hannah

== Production ==
=== Development and pre-production ===
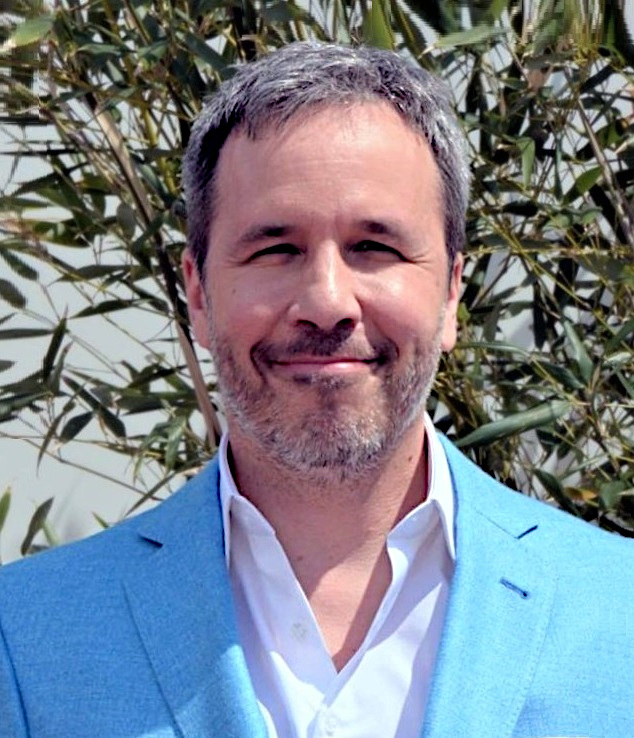
Director Denis Villeneuve had been seeking out a science fiction film to make prior to being approached to direct.

Arrival is based on the Nebula-winning 1998 science fiction novella "Story of Your Life" by Ted Chiang. The novella involves Earth's first communication with heptapods who speak in a cryptic language. Screenwriter Eric Heisserer had been introduced to the story through another of Chiang's stories, "Understand", and had begun reading Chiang's collected works when "Story of Your Life" had a "profound emotional effect" on him. As a result, he tried to adapt the story into a film script as he wanted to share it with a wider audience. After writing an initial spec script, Heisserer pitched it to production companies for several years without receiving any interest and nearly gave up on the project. Other studios turned down the project as they felt it was "too smart". Heisserer believes it was not until he had successfully completed and produced 2013's Hours that others took interest in his work, his having proved himself capable. Eventually, Dan Levine and Dan Cohen of 21 Laps Entertainment expressed interest in Heisserer's script. Shawn Levy of 21 Laps said they had become aware of "Story of Your Life" around 2011 and considered it a powerful work; when they learned of Heisserer's script adaptation, they started working closely with him, helping him refine the script before they began seeking a director and distribution studio.

One of the directors that 21 Laps approached was Denis Villeneuve. Villeneuve had wanted to make a science fiction film for some time, although he "never found the right thing". Cohen and Levine introduced Villeneuve to the novella, which he immediately took to, although his work on Prisoners meant that he did not have the time to properly adapt it into a screenplay with Heisserer. Heisserer completed a first draft, which he and Villeneuve reworked into the final script. Villeneuve changed the title, as he felt the original sounded like a romantic comedy and that the script had become very different from the short story. While Villeneuve went through "hundreds" of possible titles, Arrival was the first one his team of producers and writers had suggested.

Heisserer made several changes to "Story of Your Life" between writing his original screenplays and the final script, the main one being that the heptapods actually arrived on Earth in a type of first contact situation, as he felt this helped to create the tension and conflict needed for a film. Heisserer said that earlier versions of the script had a different ending: the gift from the heptapods was to have been "blueprints to an interstellar ship, like an ark of sorts", to enable humanity to help them in 3,000 years. But after the release of Interstellar in 2014, Heisserer and Villeneuve agreed that this would not work, and decided that the heptapods' gift would be what was "there in front of us ... the power of their language".

Amy Adams entered negotiations to star in the film in April 2014, and was confirmed by the time Jeremy Renner joined the film in March 2015. Forest Whitaker signed on in April, with Michael Stuhlbarg joining in June. Adams consulted with linguist Jessica Coon to prepare for her role.

=== Filming ===
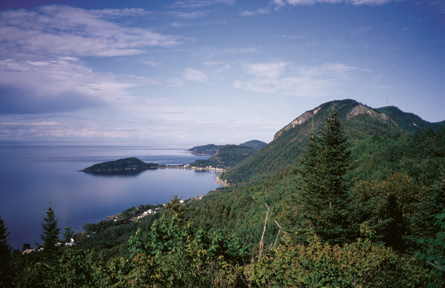
The municipality of Saint-Fabien, Quebec, doubled for the state of Montana.

Principal photography lasted for 56 days, beginning on June 7, 2015, after Renner had fulfilled his obligations to Captain America: Civil War. Filming was done mainly in and around Montreal, Quebec, with Saint-Fabien serving as Montana. The team took some time to find the right site to represent the landing of the spacecraft because producers wanted to avoid a mountainous site that might dwarf the scale of the ship, but thought a barren location would be clichéd. Most of the filming that did not involve the exterior of a ship was done indoors on sound stages, although a real house in Chemin de l'Île, Vaudreuil-Dorion, was used as Banks's home. The scenes of the university where Banks teaches were shot on the main campus of Université de Montréal, including HEC Montréal's auditorium and cafeteria. Bradford Young was sought out by Villeneuve as he was looking for a cinematographer with a sensibility toward natural lighting. Said Villeneuve: "I wanted the movie to have strong roots in realism. I wanted a cinematographer who would not be afraid to deal with intimacy. It's a very specific sensibility that I felt in Bradford's previous work." Color timing was used as a means of matching Louise's state of mind at a given moment. Young said, "I went for cooler colors when I wanted Amy to feel worn down. We tried to pull back on that a little bit, but then Denis stopped me in the [color timing] and told me not to be so concerned about skin tone and let her be pasty, let her exist in that melancholy space, let us feel that visually." When discussing the film with Villeneuve, Young described the director's goal of making a "dirty" science fiction film by making it look more grounded and "slightly boring", as Villeneuve put it. Young also used the book Speedway by photographer Martina Hoogland Ivanow as a reference for the film's look.

=== Visual effects ===
Production designer Patrice Vermette discussed the film in a February 2017 interview with Popular Mechanics, saying that a big influence on the film's look was the works of James Turrell, particularly the design of the meeting room aboard the alien craft. "I wanted the simplicity and the sensorial experience you feel in a room like that. That big screen was always there in the script, and I used it as an element to unite Louise's world. For me, that big screen is more than a screen—that room, which they called in the script 'the interview room,' is a classroom. That big white screen, [you see it] represented in Louise's house with the big window. You also see it in her school, in her classroom."

Rodeo FX completed 60 visual shots for the film, and said that its biggest challenge was the sequence in which Louise and Ian first enter the alien craft.

The asteroid 15 Eunomia is the inspiration for the look of the heptapod ships.

=== Linguistics ===
Both the book and the screenwriting required the invention of a form of alien linguistics which recurs in the plot. The film uses a script designed by the artist Martine Bertrand, based on scriptwriter Heisserer's original concept. Computer scientists Stephen and Christopher Wolfram analyzed it to provide the basis for Banks's work in the film. Their works are summarized in a GitHub repository. Three linguists from McGill University were consulted. The sound files for the alien language were created with consultation from Morgan Sonderegger, a phonetics expert. Lisa Travis was consulted for set design during the construction of the scientist's workplaces. Jessica Coon, a Canada Research Chair in Syntax and Indigenous Languages, was consulted for her linguistics expertise during the review of the script. Heisserer said at the Alamo Drafthouse's Fantastic Fest premiere of Arrival at the end of September 2016 that Shang's wife's last words, translated into English, were "In war, there are no winners, only widows". Villeneuve decided not to include subtitles for the line; Heisserer said he would have preferred it not be kept secret, and was happy to reveal the translation.

=== Music and soundtrack ===
Jóhann Jóhannsson began writing the score as the shooting started, drawing on the screenplay and concept art for inspiration. He developed one of the main themes in the first week using vocals and experimental piano loops. The original soundtrack was released by Deutsche Grammophon on November 11, 2016.

Max Richter's preexisting piece "On the Nature of Daylight" is featured in the film's opening and closing scenes. Due to the prominent use of Richter's music, which had also featured in Martin Scorsese's film Shutter Island, Jóhann's score was deemed ineligible for the Academy Award for Best Original Score, the rationale being that voters would be influenced by the use of preexisting music when judging its merits.

== Marketing and release ==
A teaser trailer was released in August 2016, followed the next week by the first official trailer. Paramount Pictures released a series of promotional posters, with one showing a UFO hovering above a Hong Kong skyline that included Shanghai's Oriental Pearl Tower. The inaccuracy angered Hong Kong social media users. The posters were withdrawn and a statement attributed the inaccuracy to a third-party vendor.

In May 2014, while titled Story of Your Life, Paramount Pictures acquired US, Canadian and Chinese distribution rights. Shortly after, Sony Pictures Worldwide Acquisitions acquired international distribution rights excluding the UK, Australia, China, Greece, India, the Middle East, Turkey and Israel. Entertainment One acquired UK distribution rights while Roadshow Films acquired Australian distribution rights, Reliance Entertainment for India (ultimately it was MVP Entertainment that released it there), Lev Cinemas for Israel, Italia Film for the Middle East, Turkey and Greece, licensing rights to Chantier Films for Turkey and Spentzos Films for Greece. The film had its world premiere at the Venice Film Festival on September 1, 2016. It also screened at the Toronto International Film Festival, the Telluride Film Festival, and the BFI London Film Festival. The film was released on November 11, 2016.

=== Home media ===
Arrival was released on Digital HD on January 31, 2017, and on Ultra HD Blu-ray, Blu-ray and DVD on February 14 the same year.

== Reception ==
=== Box office ===
Arrival grossed $100 million in the United States and Canada, and $113 million in other countries, for a worldwide total of $213 million, against a production budget of $47 million.

In the United States and Canada, Arrival was released alongside Almost Christmas and Shut In, and was originally expected to gross around $17 million from 2,317 theaters in its opening weekend, with the studio projecting a more conservative debut of $12–15 million. The film made $1.4 million from Thursday night previews at 1,944 theaters and $9.4 million on its first day, pushing projections up to $24 million. It ended up grossing $24.1 million over the weekend, finishing third at the box office. In its second weekend, the film grossed $12.1 million (a drop of 49.6%), and in its third made $11.5 million (dropping just 5.6%). Following its eight Oscar nominations, the film returned to 1,221 theaters on January 27, 2017 (an increase of 1,041 from the week before) and grossed $1.5 million (up 357.4% from its previous week's $321,411).

=== Critical response ===
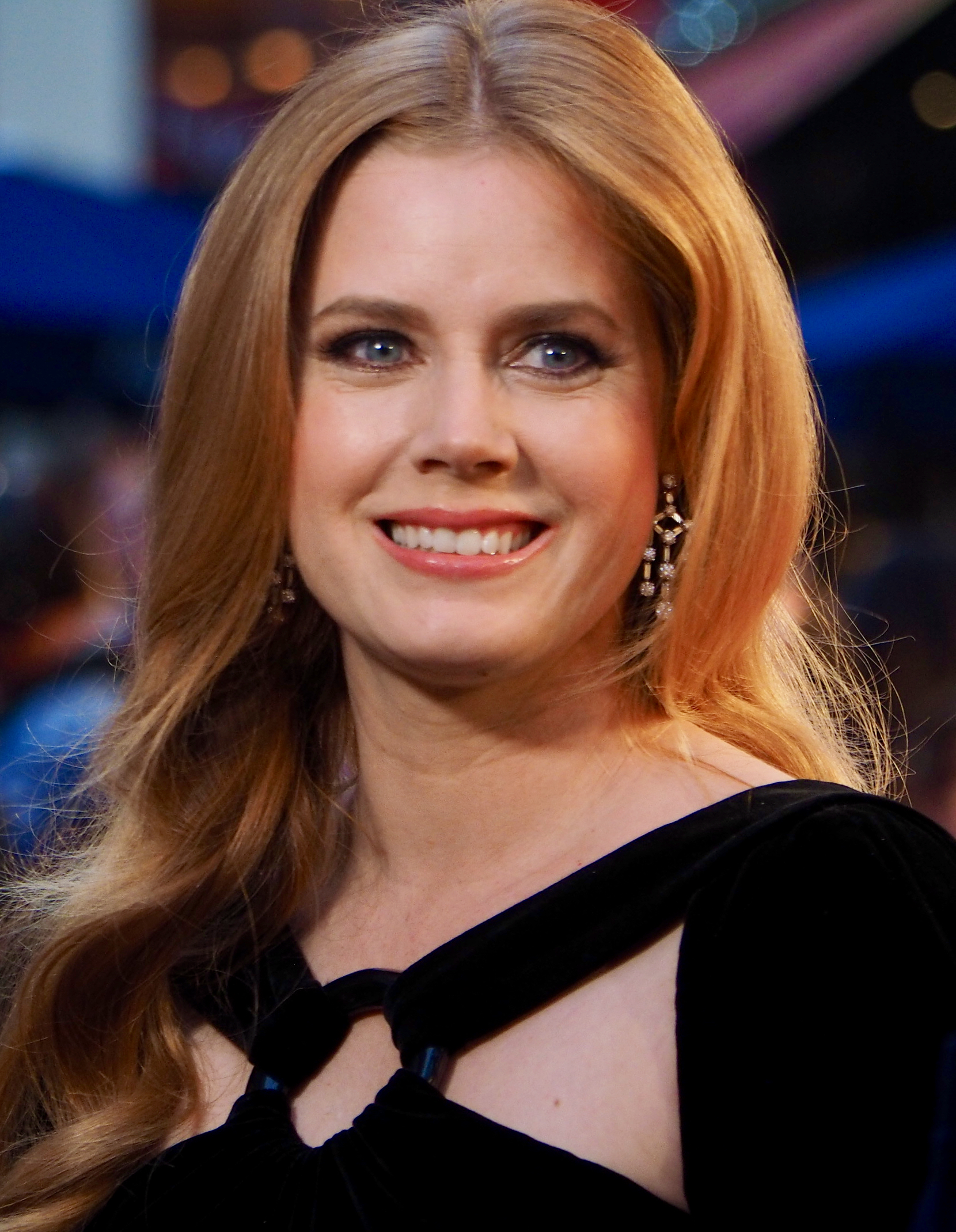
Amy Adams's performance as Louise Banks garnered widespread critical acclaim.

On Rotten Tomatoes, the film has an approval rating of 94% based on 439 reviews, with an average rating of 8.40/10. The website's critical consensus reads, "Arrival delivers a must-see experience for fans of thinking person's sci-fi that anchors its heady themes with genuinely affecting emotion and a terrific performance from Amy Adams." On Metacritic, the film has a score of 81 out of 100, based on 52 reviews, indicating "universal acclaim". Audiences polled by CinemaScore gave the film an average grade of "B" on an A+ to F scale.

Robbie Collin of The Telegraph praised the film, calling it "introspective, philosophical and existentially inclined—yet [it] unfolds in an unwavering tenor of chest-tightening excitement. And there is a mid-film revelation—less a sudden twist than sleek unwinding of everything you think you know—that feels, when it hits you, like your seat is tipping back." Brian Tallerico of RogerEbert.com gave the film three out of four: "It's a movie designed to simultaneously challenge viewers, move them and get them talking. For the most part, it succeeds." For Time, Sam Lansky called it "sophisticated, grownup sci-fi: a movie about aliens for people who don't like movies about aliens". IGN reviewer Chris Tilly gave it a score of 8.5 out of 10, saying: "Arrival is a language lesson masquerading as a blockbuster, though much more entertaining than that sounds... it's smart, sophisticated sci-fi that asks big questions, and does a pretty good job of answering them". Kenneth Turan of the Los Angeles Times praised Adams's performance, writing, "Arrival is really Adams' film, a showcase for her ability to quietly and effectively meld intelligence, empathy, and reserve". Writing for USA Today, Brian Truitt called Adams a "definite contender" for the Oscar for Best Actress, saying she was "spectacular in giving Louise the right emotional balance".

Conversely, Forrest Wickman of Slate had a more mixed opinion of the film, praising the cinematography and musical score, but writing that he thought it was similar to Christopher Nolan's "only intermittently stellar" Interstellar, and criticizing the dialogue as "clunky".

Rex Reed, writing for the New York Observer, gave the film one out of four, calling it Villeneuve's "latest exercise in pretentious poopery" and referring to a lack of action in the storyline.

The Guardian rated it the third-best film of 2016. Critic Catherine Shoard said that it "amounts to something transcendent; something to reignite your excitement for cinema, for life". Numerous other publications and websites, including io9, Den of Geek, Mir Fantastiki, The Atlantic, Blastr, and Digital Trends named Arrival the best film of 2016.

In 2021, members of Writers Guild of America West (WGAW) and Writers Guild of America, East (WGAE) ranked its screenplay 27th in WGA's 101 Greatest Screenplays of the 21st Century (so far). In 2025, the film ranked number 29 on The New York Times' list of "The 100 Best Movies of the 21st Century" and number 20 on the "Readers' Choice" edition of the list.

=== Response from academics ===
David Adger, Professor of linguistics at Queen Mary University of London, had a favorable view of the accuracy of the linguistics in Arrival, saying, "the portrayal of trying different hypotheses about the language, coming up with generalizations, and testing them out was spot on."

Similarly, Jessica Coon, a linguistics professor who teaches at McGill University and helped with the film's linguistics, said, "what the film gets exactly right is both the interactive nature but also that you really have to start small." She noted that the creators had not invented a complete language.

Linguistics professor Betty Birner, who teaches at Northern Illinois University, said that the film's use of the Sapir–Whorf hypothesis went "beyond anything that is plausible". She also felt the film oversimplified the process of translating the aliens' language, skipping straight from Banks establishing the basic vocabulary of the language to her being able to understand abstract concepts such as "weapon".

=== Awards and nominations ===
At the 89th Academy Awards, Arrival was nominated for Best Picture, Best Director, Best Adapted Screenplay, Best Cinematography, Best Production Design, Best Film Editing, Best Sound Mixing, and Best Sound Editing, winning the last.

Adams was nominated for the Golden Globe Award for Best Actress in a Motion Picture – Drama; AACTA International Award for Best Actress; BAFTA Award for Best Actress in a Leading Role; Screen Actors Guild Award for Outstanding Performance by a Female Actor in a Leading Role; and the National Board of Review Award for Best Actress, which she won. Composer Jóhann Jóhannsson was nominated for Golden Globe Award for Best Original Score.

== See also ==
- Alien language in science fiction
- List of films featuring extraterrestrials
