= Jessica Coon =

Professor of linguistics

- Scientific career
- Education: Massachusetts Institute of Technology; Reed College
- Fields: Syntax, indigenous languages
- Thesis: Complementation in Chol (Mayan): A Theory of Split Ergativity (2010)
- Doctoral advisor: David Pesetsky
- Website: jessica.lingspace.org

Jessica Coon is a James McGill Professor of Linguistics at McGill University She was the linguistics expert consultant for the 2016 film Arrival.

Coon works on syntactic theory and cross-linguistic variation with a focus on Mayan languages. She has published work on topics including ergativity, split ergativity, verb-initial word order, case and agreement, and nominalization. She has also published research on topics in Mi'gmaq (Algonquian) and Kanien'kéha (Northern Iroquoian). In addition to research in syntactic theory, she has co-led grant-funded projects which collaborate with language speakers and learners to contribute to language revitalization initiatives.

== Early life and education ==
Coon received her PhD from MIT in 2010 with a dissertation on aspect-based split ergativity, with a focus on the Ch'ol (Mayan) language, and cross-linguistic extensions.

Coon received her BA in linguistics-anthropology from Reed College in May 2004.

== Key publications ==
- Coon, Jessica and Stefan Keine (2021). ‘Feature gluttony .’ Linguistic Inquiry, 52, 4: 655–710.
- Coon, Jessica, Nico Baier, and Theodore Levin (2021). ‘Mayan Agent Focus and the Ergative Extraction Constraint: Facts and Fictions Revisited.’ Language, 97, 2: 269–332. DOI: https://doi.org/10.1353/lan.2021.0019.
- Coon, Jessica and Lauren Clemens (2018). 'Deriving verb-initial word order in Mayan.' Language, 94,2: 237–280.
- Coon, Jessica (2017). Ch’ol. The Mayan Languages, eds. Judith Aissen, Nora England, and Roberto Zavala. London: Routledge.
- Coon, Jessica, Pedro Mateo Pedro, and Omer Preminger (2014). 'The role of case in A-bar extraction asymmetries: Evidence from Mayan.' Linguistic Variarion, 14,2: 179–242.
- Coon, Jessica (2013). Aspects of Split Ergativity. New York: Oxford University Press.
