= List of Austronesian languages =

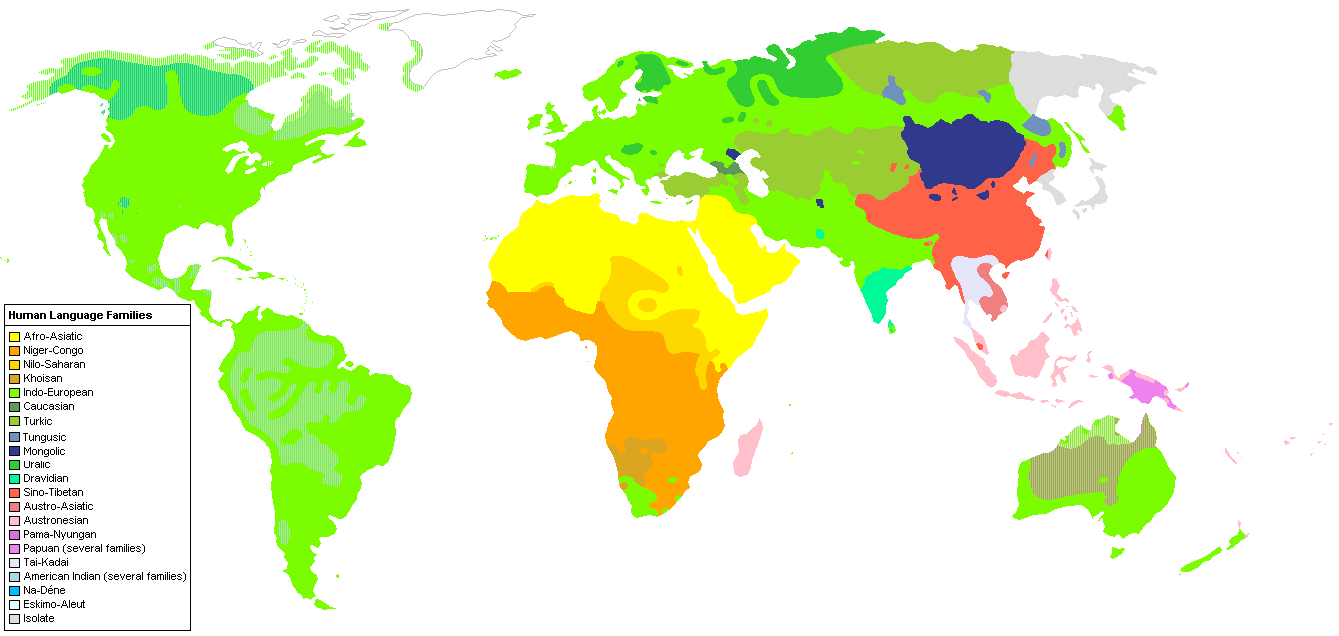
Map showing the distribution of language families; the pink color shows where Austronesian languages are spoken.

This is a list Austronesian languages, a language family originating from Taiwan, that is widely dispersed throughout the islands of Southeast Asia (Indonesia and Philippines) and the Pacific, with a few members spoken on continental Asia and Madagascar.

== Official languages ==
=== Sovereign states ===
Language	Named national varieties (if any)	Speakers	Native name	Official status
Fijian		639,210	Na Vosa Vakaviti	Fiji
Tagalog	Filipino	100,000,000 (L1 & L2); 20,000,000 (L1); 80,000,000 (L2)	Wikang Tagalog/Wikang Filipino	Philippines
Gilbertese		120,000	Taetae ni Kiribati	Kiribati
Hiri Motu		120,000 (L2)	Hiri Motu	Papua New Guinea
Malay	Indonesian (Note: national standard based on variety spoken in Riau Archipelago)	252,000,000-280,000,000	Bahasa Indonesia	Indonesia
Malay	Malay (Note: A standardised Malay based on variety spoken in Johor sometimes referred to as Bahasa Malaysia (Malaysian language) in Malaysia)	35,000,000	Bahasa Melayu/بهاس ملايو	Malaysia; Indonesia (Note: apart from the national standard Indonesian language, Malay has the status of a regional language in Sumatra and Kalimantan); Brunei; Singapore
Malagasy		30,000,000	Fiteny Malagasy	Madagascar
Māori		150,000	Te Reo Māori	New Zealand
Marshallese		55,000	Kajin M̧ajeļ	Marshall Islands
Nauruan		6,000	Dorerin Naoero	Nauru
Palauan		15,000	Tekoi er a Belau	Palau
Samoan		510,000	Gagana Sāmoa	Samoa
Tetum		800,000	Lia-Tetun	East Timor; Indonesia (Note: apart from the national standard Indonesian language, Tetum has the status of a regional language in Belu Regency, East Nusa Tenggara)
Tongan		108,000	Lea Faka-Tonga	Tonga
Tuvaluan		13,000	Te Ggana/Gagana Tuuvalu	Tuvalu

=== Territories ===
Language	Speakers	Native name	Official status	Country
Carolinian	5,700	Refaluwasch	Northern Mariana Islands	United States
Chamorro	95,000	Fino' CHamoru	Guam; Northern Mariana Islands	United States
Cook Islands Māori	14,000	Māori Kūki 'Āirani; Te Reo Ipukarea	Cook Islands	New Zealand
Hawaiian	24,000	ʻŌlelo Hawaiʻi	Hawaii	United States
Javanese	~3,000,000	Basa Jawa	Yogyakarta	Indonesia
Kanak			New Caledonia	France
Niuean	8,000	Ko e Vagahau Niuē	Niue	New Zealand
Rapa Nui	5,000	Vananga Rapa Nui	Easter Island	Chile
Samoan	55,000	Gagana Sāmoa	American Samoa	United States
Sonsorolese	600	Ramari Dongosaro	Sonsorol	Palau
Tahitian	120,000	Te Reo Mā'ohi/Tahiti	French Polynesia	France
Tobian	100	Ramarih Hatohobei	Hatohobei	Palau
Tokelauan	3,500	Gagana Tokelau	Tokelau	New Zealand

== Languages with at least 3 million native speakers ==
- Malay
  - Indonesian (75 native ~ 252 million total)
  - Malaysian Malay (30 million)
- Javanese (68 million)
- Tagalog
  - Filipino (47 million native, ~100 million total)
- Sundanese (32 million)
- Cebuano (22 million native, ~30 million total)
- Malagasy (17 million)
- Madurese (10 – 13.6 million)
- Batak (8.5 million, all dialects)
- Ilokano (8 million native, ~10 million total)
- Hiligaynon (Ilonggo) (7 million native, ~11 million total)
- Minangkabau (7 million)
- Bugis (5 million)
- Bikol (4.6 million, all dialects)
- Banjar (4.5 million)
- Waray (3.6 million)
- Balinese (3.3 million)
- Acehnese (2.8 million)

== Dialects and creoles ==
=== Dialects of major Austronesian languages ===
- Banyumas Javanese (15,000,000 native, Indonesia)
- Kedah Malay (5,000,000 native, Malaysia)
- Banten Sundanese (3,350,000 native, Indonesia)
- Palembang Malay (3,100,000 native, Indonesia)
- Central Bikol language (2,500,000 native, Philippines)
- Batak Toba language (2,000,000 native, Indonesia)
- Albay Bikol language (1,900,000 native, Philippines)
- Kelantan Malay (1,600,000 native, Malaysia)
- Pattani Malay (1,500,000 native, Thailand)
- Perak Malay (1,400,000 native, Malaysia)
- Batak Pakpak language (1,200,000 native, Indonesia)
- Batak Simalungun language (1,200,000 native, Indonesia)
- Batak Mandailing language (1,100,000 native, Indonesia)
- Terengganu Malay (1,100,000 native, Malaysia)
- Pahang Malay (1,000,000 native, Malaysia)
- Batak Angkola language (750,000 native, Indonesia)
- Jambi Malay (700,000 native, Indonesia)
- Batak Karo language (600,000 native, Indonesia)
- Osing Javanese (300,000 native, Indonesia)
- Batak Alas language (200,000 native, Indonesia)
- Itbayat language (3,500 native, Philippines)
- Niihau dialect (500 native, Hawaii, United States)

=== Creoles and pidgins based on Austronesian languages ===
- Betawi language (3,000,000 native, Indonesia)
- Sabah Malay (3,000,000, Malaysia)
- Manado Malay (850,000, Indonesia)
- North Moluccan Malay (700,000, Indonesia)
- Baba Malay (500,000, Indonesia and Malaysia)
- Papuan Malay (500,000, Indonesia)
- Ambonese Malay (250,000 native, Indonesia)
- Sri Lanka Malay (50,000, Sri Lanka)
- Balinese Malay (25,000, Indonesia)
- Cocos Malay (4,000, Australia and Malaysia)
- Chetty Malay (300?, Malaysia)
- Broome Pearling Lugger Pidgin (40?, Australia)
- Bahasa Rojak (?, Malaysia)

== See also ==
- Austronesian Formal Linguistics Association
