= Lisa Travis =

Canadian linguist

Lisa deMena Travis is a researcher and educator in the field of linguistics, specializing in syntax and in the study of Austronesian languages such as Malagasy and Tagalog. She is currently a professor of linguistics at McGill University. Her 1984 proposal of the Head Movement Constraint, which seeks to account for limitations on the movement of syntactic heads in question formation, has become a cornerstone of generative linguistics.

Lisa Travis is one of the co-founders of the Austronesian Formal Linguistics Association (AFLA), a learned society that provides forums for collaborative research and runs an annual conference.

Travis was consulted by the set design team of Denis Villeneuve's Arrival during the construction of the workplace sets for the protagonist, a linguist.

== Publications ==
Lisa Travis has contributed to and been an editor for numerous journals, books, and conference proceedings in the field. Some notable examples include:

- "Inner Aspect: the articulation of the VP", 2010, Dordrecht:Springer
- "Austronesian and Theoretical Linguistics", 2010, Amsterdam:John Benjamins (editor, with Raphael Mercado, Eric Potsdam)
- "Bahasa Indonesia as a predicate fronting language", 2008, in Lingua, 18: 1583-1602
- "Voice morphology in Malagasy as Clitic Left Dislocation or through the looking glass: Malagasy in Wonderland", 2006. In Hans-Martin Gärtner, Paul Law, Joachim Sabel, eds., Clause Structure and Adjuncts in Austronesian Languages, 281-318. Berlin: Mouton de Gruyter.
- "Formal issues in Austronesian Linguistics", 2000, Dordrecht:Kluwer Academic Publishers (editor, with I. Paul and V. Phillips)
