= Jonathan Bobaljik =

Linguist working on the Itelmen language

Jonathan David Bobaljik
- Occupation: Linguist

Academic background
- Education: Massachusetts Institute of Technology (PhD)
- Thesis: Morphosyntax: The syntax of verbal inflection (1995)
- Doctoral advisor: David Pesetsky; Noam Chomsky

Academic work
- Discipline: Morphology; Syntax; Typology
- Sub-discipline: Distributed Morphology
- Institutions: Harvard University; University of Connecticut; McGill University
- Notable ideas: Comparative-Superlative Generalization
- Website: scholar.harvard.edu/bobaljik/home

Jonathan David Bobaljik (/ˈbɔːbəlɪk/) is a Canadian linguist specializing in morphology, syntax, and typology. Bobaljik received his PhD from the Massachusetts Institute of Technology in 1995 with a thesis titled Morphosyntax: The syntax of verbal inflection advised by Noam Chomsky and David Pesetsky. He is currently a professor at Harvard University and has previously held positions at McGill University and University of Connecticut. He is a leading scholar in the area of Distributed Morphology.

In 2012, Bobaljik published a book (Universals in Comparative Morphology: Suppletion, Superlatives and the Structure of Words) on universals in comparative constructions, where he proposes the Comparative-Superlative Generalization. This book was awarded the Linguistic Society of America's Leonard Bloomfield Book Award.

Bobaljik has worked extensively on the critically endangered Itelmen language. He has participated in the development of an Itelmen-Russian dictionary, its mobile app, and is currently working on an audio and video dictionary of the language.
