= David Pesetsky =

American linguist

- Born: 1957 (age 68–69)
- Education: MIT; Yale
- Awards: Fellow of the AAAS, Fellow of the Linguistic Society of America
- Scientific career
- Fields: Linguistics; Generative grammar; Syntax
- Workplaces: MIT; UMass Amherst
- Thesis: Paths and Categories
- Doctoral advisor: Noam Chomsky
- Doctoral students: Jessica Coon; Jonathan Bobaljik
- Website: https://davidpesetsky.com

David Michael Pesetsky (born 1957) is an American linguist. He is the Ferrari P. Ward Professor of Modern Languages and Linguistics and former Head of the Department of Linguistics and Philosophy at the Massachusetts Institute of Technology.

== Education ==
He received a B.A. in linguistics from Yale in 1977 and a Ph.D. in linguistics from the Massachusetts Institute of Technology in 1982.

== Career ==
Pesetsky taught at the University of Southern California and the University of Massachusetts Amherst before joining the faculty of MIT in 1988. Pesetsky was elected a Fellow of the American Association for the Advancement of Science in 2011, and a Fellow of the Linguistic Society of America in 2013.

He has published articles and books within the framework of generative grammar. A specialist in syntax, he has published on the cross-linguistic properties of wh-movement as well as the theory of argument structure. In a collaboration with Esther Torrego, he developed a theory of grammatical case in noun phrases, arguing that nominative and accusative cases are the mirror image for the nominal system of phi feature agreement in the verbal system. He has worked extensively on the structure of Russian, and recently has argued (in collaboration with Jonah Katz) that the syntax of tonal music is identical to the structure of language.

In an article coauthored with Andrew Nevins and Cilene Rodrigues, Pesetsky criticized claims by Daniel Everett concerning the Pirahã language, touching off a protracted debate in the pages of the journal Language.
