= The Journal of Comparative Germanic Linguistics =

- Discipline: Germanic languages, theoretical linguistics
- Language: English
- Edited by: Susi Wurmbrand, Henk van Riemsdijk

Publication details
- History: 1997–present
- Publisher: Springer (Netherlands)
- Frequency: Triannually

Standard abbreviations
- ISO 4: J. Comp. Ger. Linguist.

Indexing
- ISSN: 1383-4924 (print); 1572-8552 (web)

Links
- Journal homepage

The Journal of Comparative Germanic Linguistics is a peer-reviewed academic journal covering theoretical linguistic research of the Germanic languages, published by Springer Netherlands. Its editor-in-chief is Susi Wurmbrand (University of Vienna).
