= GLOW (linguistics society) =

Organization devoted to the study of generative grammar

GLOW is an international organization to further the study of generative grammar, founded in 1977 and based in the Netherlands. Its activities include its annual spring linguistics conference and periodic summer schools. In the past, GLOW published a newsletter that discusses current intellectual (and organizational) issues in the study of generative grammar. The GLOW name originally stood for "Generative Linguistics in the Old World."

GLOW was founded by Jan Koster, Henk van Riemsdijk and Jean-Roger Vergnaud in an attempt to provide an annual meeting for European researchers in Generative Grammar who felt themselves largely excluded from other organizations in the late 1970s.

By the beginning of the 21st century, GLOW had emerged as one of the leading organizations in linguistics internationally, as well as in Europe. "Sister conferences" to the annual GLOW meeting in Europe have been organized under the rubric "GLOW Asia" in Japan, Korea and India, and the European GLOW conference itself has travelled as far south as Morocco (and as far north as Tromsø). The 2015 Colloquium was held in Paris, the 2016 meeting took place Göttingen, in 2017 Leiden was the host, in 2018 Budapest, in 2019 Oslo.

== GLOW in Asia conferences ==
There have been 14 GLOW in Asia conferences as listed below:

| Edition | City | Institute | Date | Conference website |
|---|---|---|---|---|
| II | Nagoya, Japan | Nanzan University | September 1999 | |
| III | Taipei, Taiwan | National Tsing Hua University | January 4 – 6, 2002 | |
| IV | Seoul, Korea | Seoul National University | August 21 – 23, 2003 | |
| V | Delhi, India | University of Delhi and Jawaharlal Nehru University | | |
| VI | Hong Kong | The Chinese University of Hong Kong | December 27-29, 2007 | |
| VII | Hyderabad, India | The English and Foreign Languages University | February 25-28, 2009 | |
| VIII | Beijing, China | Beijing Language and Culture University | August 12-14, 2010 | |
| IX | Tsu, Mie, Japan | Mie University | September 4-6, 2012 | |
| X | Taipei, Taiwan | National Tsing Hua University | 24-26 May, 2014 | |
| XI | Singapore | National University of Singapore | 20-22 February, 2017 | |
| XII | Seoul, Korea | Dongguk University | 6-9 August, 2019 | |
| XIII | Hong Kong | The Chinese University of Hong Kong | 4-7 August, 2022 | |
| XIV | Hong Kong | The Chinese University of Hong Kong | 6-8 March, 2024 | |
