= Journal of English Linguistics =

Academic journal of linguistics

- Discipline: Linguistics
- Language: English
- Edited by: Peter Grund, Alexandra D'Arcy

Publication details
- History: 1967-present
- Publisher: SAGE Publishing
- Frequency: Quarterly
- Impact factor: 0.609 (2017)

Standard abbreviations
- ISO 4: J. Engl. Linguist.

Indexing
- ISSN: 0075-4242 (print); 1552-5457 (web)
- LCCN: 66064238
- OCLC no.: 60688732

Links
- Journal homepage; Online access; Online archive

The Journal of English Linguistics is a quarterly peer-reviewed academic journal covering the field of linguistics. The editors-in-chief are Peter Grund (University of Kansas) and Alexandra D'Arcy (University of Victoria). It was established in 1967 and is published by SAGE Publishing.

== Abstracting and indexing ==
The journal is abstracted and indexed in Scopus, EBSCO databases, ProQuest databases, and the Social Sciences Citation Index. According to the Journal Citation Reports, its 2017 impact factor is 0.609, ranking it 109th out of 181 journals in the category "Linguistics".
