= István Kenesei =

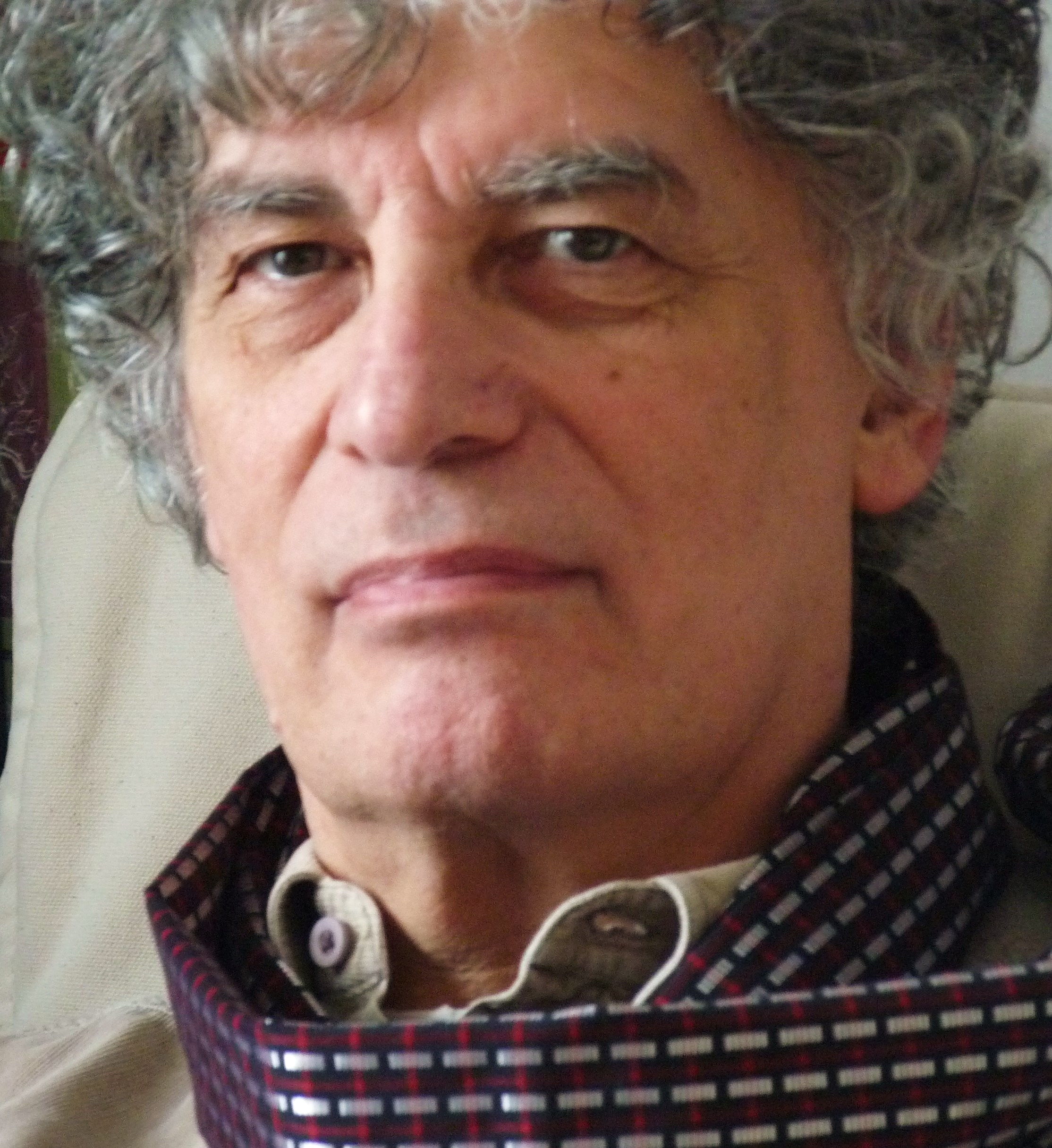
- Born: March 29, 1947 (age 79); Budapest, Hungary
- Known for: Syntax
- Awards: Order of Merit of the Republic of Hungary, Knight's Cross, 2007

Academic background
- Education: Eötvös Loránd University (ELTE)

Academic work
- Discipline: Linguist
- Sub-discipline: Morphology; Theoretical linguistics; Generative grammar; Cognitive science
- Institutions: Research Institute for Linguistics; Hungarian Academy of Sciences
- Website: website in English

István Kenesei (Hungarian: [ˈiːʃ tva:n ˈkɛnɛʃɛi]; born 29 March 1947) is a Hungarian linguist, professor emeritus and corresponding member of the Hungarian Academy of Sciences. His research focuses on generative grammar, theoretical linguistics and foundational problems of syntax, semantics and morphology. He works both in Hungary and around the world, and has published in English and Hungarian.

== Biography and career ==
He was born on 29 March 1947 in Budapest, Hungary. He took M.A. degree at the Eötvös Loránd University, Faculty of Arts in English studies in Budapest in 1970. He started his academic career at the Department of English Studies at the Attila József University (JATE), Szeged and he became an educator and a research fellow in 1971.

He received his dr. univ. (doctor universitatis) degree in 1974. He took candidate (C.Sc.) of Linguistics degree in 1980. In 1982 he was appointed to an associate professor (docent, reader).

He was appointed to the head of the department, and he acted as the chairman from 1985 until 1986.

He was awarded Doctor of Science (D.Sc.) degree in Linguistics in 1992.

In 1993 he received the title of university (full) professor. From 1997 until 2000 he was the Vice-Rector for Science, Research Development and Grants, JATE. From 1993 until 2000 he acted as a subprogram leader of Theoretical linguistics in the Graduate School in Linguistics at the JATE

In 2000 the universities and colleges in Szeged were integrated into the University of Szeged. From 2000 until 2017 he was the chairman of the united Graduate School in Linguistics and he was a member of the Council of the Graduate School in Linguistics and a VIP member of the doctoral school.at the University of Szeged.

From 2002 to 2017 he managed the Research Institute for Linguistics, Hungarian Academy of Sciences (HAS) as its director until his retirement.

He was elected to corresponding membership of the HAS in 2016. In 2017 the honorific title of professor emeritus was conferred upon him.

He is a notable and respected scientist both in Hungary and around the world and developed significant research and professional relationships. István Kenesei lectured as a visiting professor at several universities of the world: University of Delaware in Newark, Delaware, Ca' Foscari University of Venice in Italy and Utrecht University in Netherlands. His working papers were issued in both national and international prestigious professional research scientific journals, and 156 books and scientific articles were published.

== Committee memberships ==
=== Editorial board memberships ===
- Általános Nyelvészeti Tanulmányok (General Linguistic Studies Serial)
- Approaches to Hungarian; John Benjamins, Amsterdam
- Comprehensive Grammar Resources; Amsterdam University Press, Amsterdam
- LingDok: Nyelvészeti Doktoranduszok Dolgozatai (Theses of PhD Students in Linguistics); JATEPress, Szeged
- Acta Linguistica Hungarica
- Pragmatic Interfaces, Equinox, London

=== Carrier-related public activities ===
- 2016 Corresponding Member of the Hungarian Academy of Sciences (HAS)
- 2013 Member of the Academy of Europe (Academia Europaea)
- 2003–2004 Visiting Fellow, Collegium Budapest - Institute for Advanced Study
- 1998 Visiting Scholar, Clare College, Cambridge, England
- 1997–2001 Széchenyi Professorial Fellowship, Hungarian Ministry of Education

== Achievements ==
His main fields of interest are in the generative grammar and theoretical linguistics with special respect to the foundational problems of syntax, semantics and morphology. Within the framework generative grammar of linguistics he revealed the relationship between the cognitive and the syntactic factors of linguistic theorizing.

== Awards and honours ==
- 2007 Order of Merit of the Republic of Hungary, Knight's Cross
- 2002 Országh László Prize, Hungarian Society for the Study of English

== Works ==
=== Books ===
- Kenesei I, Vago R, Fenyvesi A 2010: Hungarian, London: Routledge, 508 p. (Descriptive Grammars Series)

=== Selected papers ===
- Lipták Anikó, Kenesei István 2017: Passive potential affixation: syntax or lexicon?, ACTA LINGUISTICA HUNGARICA / ACTA LINGUISTICA ACADEMICA 64: (1) pp. 45–77.
- Kenesei István 2014: On a multifunctional derivational affix, WORD STRUCTURE 7: (2) pp. 214–239.
- Kenesei I 2013: The role of creativity in the cognitive turn in linguistics, INTERNATIONAL REVIEW OF PRAGMATICS 5: pp. 270–291.
- Kenesei I 2009: Quantifiers, negation, and focus on the left periphery in Hungarian, LINGUA 119: (4) pp. 564–591.
- Kenesei I 2008: Funkcionális kategóriák, In: Szerk.: Kiefer F Strukturális magyar nyelvtan 4.: A szótár szerkezete. Budapest: Akadémiai Kiadó, 2008. pp. 601–637.
- Kenesei I 2007: Semiwords and affixoids. The territory between word and affix, ACTA LINGUISTICA HUNGARICA / ACTA LINGUISTICA ACADEMICA 54: pp. 263–293.
