= Indo-European twin myth =

Actors in Proto-Indo-European mythology

The myth of *Manu and *Yemo is the foundational creation myth of Proto-Indo-European mythology. In the story, *Manu kills *Yemo and then fashions the universe from *Yemo's body. *Yemo is sometimes also interpreted as a primordial hermaphrodite.

The comparative analysis of different Indo-European tales has led scholars to reconstruct an original Proto-Indo-European creation myth involving twin brothers, *Mónus ('Man') and *YémHos ('Twin'), as the progenitors of the world and mankind, and a hero sometimes called *Trito ('Third') who ensured the continuity of the original sacrifice.

Although some thematic parallels can be made with legends of the Ancient Near East, and even of Polynesia or South America, the linguistic correspondences found in descendant cognates of *Manu and *Yemo- make it very likely that the myth discussed here has a Proto-Indo-European (PIE) origin.

Following a first paper on the cosmogonical legend of Manu and Yemo, published simultaneously with Jaan Puhvel in 1975 (who pointed out the Roman reflex of the story), Bruce Lincoln assembled the initial part of the myth with the legend of the third man Trito in a single ancestral motif.

Since the 1970s, the reconstructed motifs of Manu and Yemo, and to a lesser extent that of Trito, have been generally accepted among scholars.

== Overview ==
=== Reconstruction ===
There is no scholarly consensus as to which of the variants is the most accurate reconstruction of the Proto-Indo-European cosmogonic myth. Bruce Lincoln's reconstruction of the Proto-Indo-European motif known as "Twin and Man" is supported by a number of scholars such as Jaan Puhvel, J. P. Mallory, Douglas Q. Adams, David W. Anthony, and, in part, Martin L. West. Although some thematic parallels can be made with traditions of the Ancient Near East, and even Polynesian or South American legends, Lincoln argues that the linguistic correspondences found in descendant cognates of *Manu and *Yemo make it very likely that the myth has a Proto-Indo-European origin.

According to Edgar C. Polomé, "some elements of the [Scandinavian myth of Ymir] are distinctively Indo-European", but the reconstruction proposed by Lincoln "makes too [many] unprovable assumptions to account for the fundamental changes implied by the Scandinavian version".

=== Creation myth ===
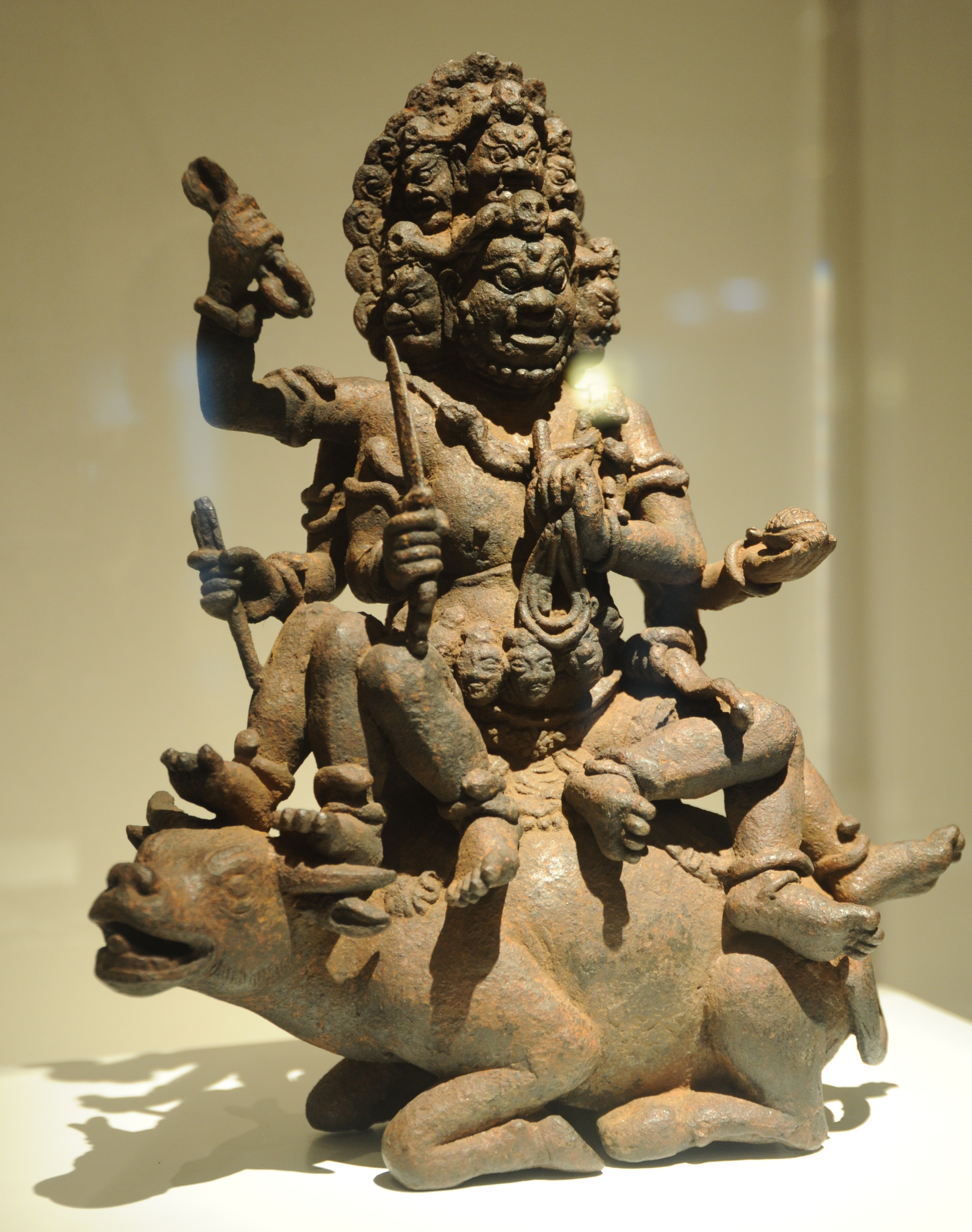
Yama, an Indic reflex of *Yemo, sitting on a water buffalo.

Lincoln reconstructs a creation myth involving twin brothers, *Manu- ('Man') and *Yemo- ('Twin'), as the progenitors of the world and humankind, and a hero named *Trito ('Third') who ensured the continuity of the original sacrifice. Regarding the primordial state that may have preceded the creation process, West notes that the Vedic, Norse and, at least partially, the Greek traditions give evidence of an era when the cosmological elements were absent, with similar formula insisting on their non-existence: "neither non-being was nor being was at that time; there was not the air, nor the heaven beyond it ..." (Rigveda), "... there was not sand nor sea nor the cool waves; earth was nowhere nor heaven above; Ginnungagap there was, but grass nowhere ..." (Völuspá), "... there was Chasm and Night and dark Erebos at first, and broad Tartarus, but earth nor air nor heaven there was ..." (The Birds).

=== First Warrior ===
To the third man Trito, the celestial gods offer cattle as a divine gift, which is stolen by a three-headed serpent named *Ngʷhi ('serpent'; and the Indo-European root for negation).

Trito first suffers at his hands, but fortified by an intoxicating drink and aided by a helper-god (the Storm-God or *H₂ner, 'Man'), together they go to a cave or a mountain, and the hero finally manages to overcome the monster. Trito then gives the recovered cattle back to a priest for it to be properly sacrificed. He is now the first warrior, maintaining through his heroic deeds the cycle of mutual giving between gods and mortals.

=== Three functions ===
According to Lincoln, Manu and Yemo seem to be the protagonists of "a myth of the sovereign function, establishing the model for later priests and kings", while the legend of Trito should be seen as "a myth of the warrior function, establishing the model for all later men of arms". He has thus interpreted the narrative as an expression of the priests' and kings' attempt to justify their role as indispensable for the preservation of the cosmos, and therefore as essential for the organization of society. The motif indeed recalls the Dumézilian tripartition of the cosmos between the priest (in both his magical and legal aspects), the warrior (the Third Man), and the herder (the cow).

=== Primeval hermaphrodite ===
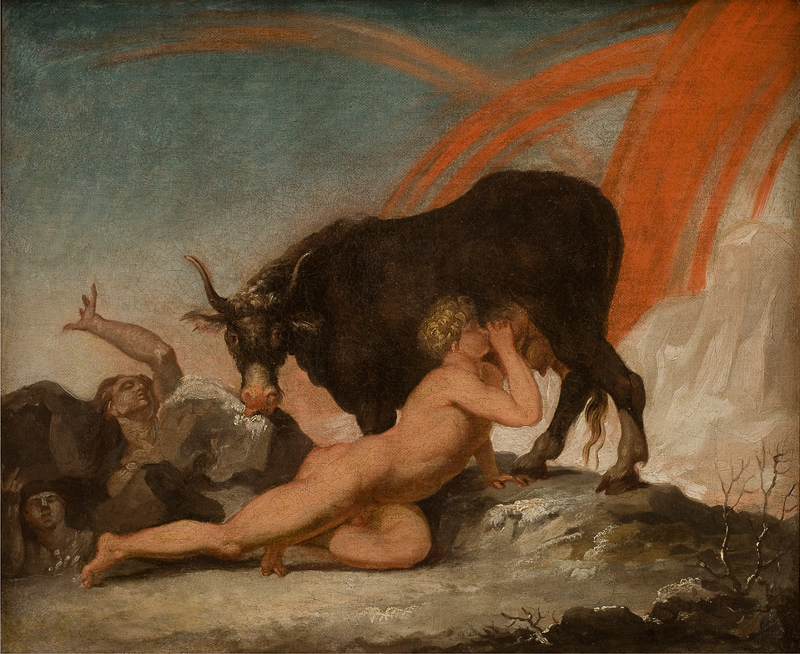
Ymir sucking the milk of the primeval cow Auðumbla. 1790.

Hermann Güntert, stressing philological parallels between the Germanic and Indo-Iranian texts, argued in 1923 for an inherited Indo-European motif of the creation of the world from the sacrifice and dismemberment of a primordial androgyne.

Some scholars have proposed that the primeval being Yemo was depicted as a two-folded hermaphrodite rather than a twin brother of Manu, both forming indeed a pair of complementary beings entwined together. The Germanic names Ymir and Tuisto were understood as 'twin', 'bisexual', or 'hermaphrodite', and some myths give a sister to the Vedic Yama, called Yamī (also 'Twin'). The primordial being may therefore have self-sacrificed, or have been divided in two, a male half and a female half, embodying a prototypal separation of the sexes that continued the primordial union of the Sky Father (*Dyēus) with the Mother Earth (*Dʰéǵʰōm).

=== Interpretations ===
The story of Trito served as a model for later epic myths about cattle raiding and most likely as a moral justification for the practice of raiding among Indo-European peoples. In the original legend, Trito is only taking back what rightfully belongs to his people, those who sacrifice properly to the gods. The myth has been interpreted either as a cosmic conflict between the heavenly hero and the earthly serpent, or as an Indo-European victory over non-Indo-European people, the monster symbolizing the aboriginal thief or usurper.

=== Legacy ===
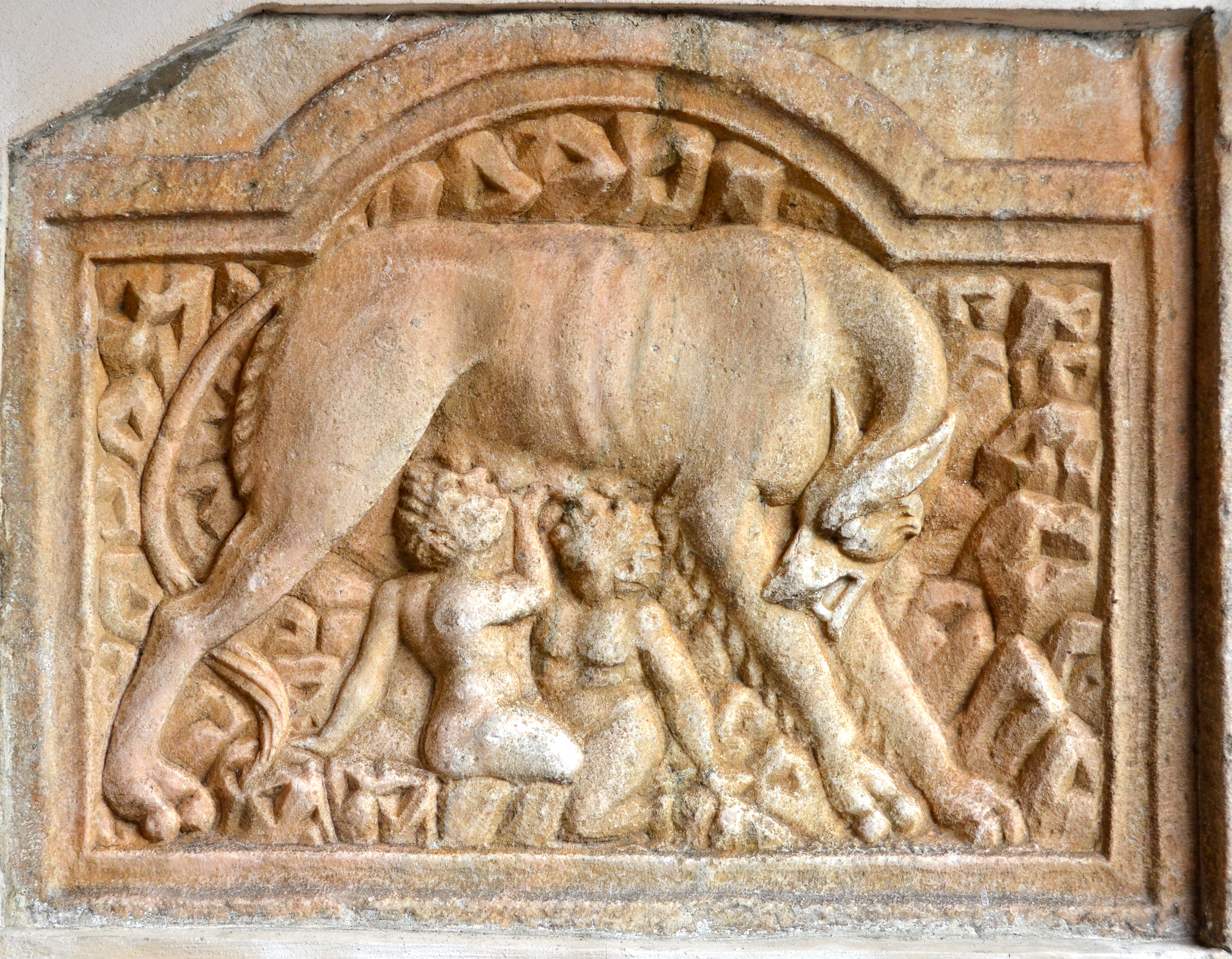
Ancient Roman relief from the Cathedral of Maria Saal showing the infant twins Romulus and Remus being suckled by a she-wolf.

Many Indo-European beliefs explain the origin of natural elements as the result of the original dismemberment of Yemo: his flesh usually becomes the earth, his hair grass, his bone yields stone, his blood water, his eyes the sun, his mind the moon, his brain the clouds, his breath the wind, and his head the heavens. The traditions of sacrificing an animal to disperse its parts according to socially established patterns, a custom found in Ancient Rome and India, has been interpreted as an attempt to restore the balance of the cosmos ruled by the original sacrifice.

The motif of Manu and Yemo has been influential throughout Eurasia following the Indo-European migrations. The Greek, Old Russian (Poem on the Dove King), depend on the Iranian, and a Chinese version of the myth has been introduced from Ancient India. The Armenian version of the myth of the First Warrior Trito depends on the Iranian, and the Roman reflexes were influenced by earlier Greek versions.

== Linguistic evidence ==
=== Manu and Yemo ===
Cognates deriving from the Proto-Indo-European First Priest *Manu ('Man', 'ancestor of humankind') include the Indic Mánu, legendary first man in Hinduism, and Manāvī, his sacrificed wife; the Germanic Mannus (Proto-Germanic *Manwaz), mythical ancestor of the West Germanic tribes; and the Persian Manūščihr (from Avestan Manūš.čiθra, 'son of Manuš'), Zoroastrian high priest of the 9th century AD.

From the name of the sacrificed First King *Yemo ('Twin') derive the Indic Yama, god of death and the underworld; the Avestan Yima, king of the Golden Age and guardian of the Otherworld; the Norse Ymir (from Proto-Germanic *Jumijaz), ancestor of the giants (jötnar); and most likely Remus (from Proto-Latin *Yemos or *Yemonos, with the initial /y/ shifting to /r/ under the influence of Rōmulus), killed in the Roman foundation myth by his twin brother Romulus. Latvian jumis ('double fruit'), Latin geminus ('twin', cf. the zodiac sign Gemini) and Middle Irish emuin ('twin') are also linguistically related.

Indo-European linguistic descendants (in bold) and thematic echoes (in italic) of the creation myth.
Tradition	First Priest	First King	First mammal	Heavenly gods
Proto-Indo-European	***Manu** ('Man')	***Yemo** ('Twin')	Primordial cow	Sky Father, Storm-god, Divine Twins
Indian	**Mánu**, Puruṣa	**Yama**, (Manāvī)	Manu's bull	The Vedic gods
Iranian	Spityura, **Manūš**čihr	**Yima**, Gayōmart	Primordial ox (Gōšūrvan)	–
Germanic	***Mannus**	**Ymir**, *Tuisto	Primordial cow (Auðhumla)	Óðinn and his brothers
Roman	Rōmulus	***Yemos** (Remus)	She-wolf	The senators

=== Trito and Ngʷhi ===
Cognates stemming from the First Warrior *Trito ('Third') include the Vedic Trita, the hero who recovered the stolen cattle from the serpent Vṛtrá; the Avestan Thrita and Thraētona ('Third' and 'Son of Third'), who won back the abducted women from the serpent Aži Dahāka; and the Norse Þriði ('Third'), one of the names of Óðinn. Other cognates may appear in the Greek expressions trítos sōtḗr (τρίτος σωτήρ; 'third saviour'), an epithet of Zeus, and tritogḗneia (τριτογήνεια, 'third born' or 'born of Zeus'), an epithet of Athena; and perhaps in the Slavic mythical hero Troyan, found in Russian and Serbian legends alike. (Note: Troyan has been tentatively connected to numeral try 'three', Ukrainian troian 'father of triplets/three sons', or considered a possible guardian deity of Russia in pre-Christian times.)

- *Ngʷhi, a term meaning 'serpent', is also related to the Indo-European root for negation (*ne-). Descendent cognates can be found in the Iranian Aži, the name of the inimical serpent, and in the Indo-Aryan áhi ('serpent'), a term used to designate the monstrous serpent Vṛtrá, both descending from Proto-Indo-Iranian *aj'hi.

Indo-European linguistic descendants (in bold) and thematic echoes (in italic) of the myth of the First Warrior.
Tradition	First warrior	Three-headed serpent	Helper god	Stolen present
Proto-Indo-European	***Trito** ('Third')	*Ngʷhi	The Storm-god or *H_{a}nēr ('Man')	Cattle
Indian	**Trita**	Vṛtrá (áhi)	Indra	Cows
Iranian	**Thraētona** ('son of **Thrita**')	**Aži** Dahāka	*Vr̥traghna	Women
Germanic	**Þriði**, Hymir	Three serpents	Þórr	Goats (?)
Graeco-Roman	Herakles	Geryon, Cācus	Helios	Cattle

== Comparative mythology ==
Many Indo-European beliefs explain aspects of human anatomy from the results of the original dismemberment of Yemo: his flesh usually becomes the earth, his hair grass, his bone yields stone, his blood water, his eyes the sun, his mind the moon, his brain the clouds, his breath the wind, and his head the heavens. The traditions of sacrificing an animal before dispersing its parts following socially established patterns, a custom found in Ancient Rome and India, has been interpreted as an attempt to restore the balance of the cosmos ruled by the original sacrifice.

In the Indo-Iranian version of the myth, his brother Manu also sacrifices the cow, and from the parts of the dead animal are born the other living species and vegetables. In the European reflexes, however, the cow (represented by a she-wolf in the Roman myth) serves only as a provider of milk and care for the twins before the creation. This divergence may be explained by the cultural differences between the Indo-Iranian and European branches of the Indo-European family, with the former still strongly influenced by pastoralism, and the latter much more agricultural, perceiving the cow mainly as a source of milk. According to Lincoln, the Indo-Iranian version best preserves the ancestral motif, since they lived closer to the original Proto-Indo-European pastoral way of life.

=== Indo-Iranian ===
==== Creation myth ====
Mánu ('Man, human') appears in the Rigveda as the first sacrificer and the founder of religious law, the Law of Mánu. He is the brother (or half-brother) of Yama ('Twin'), both presented as the sons of the solar deity Vivasvat. The association of Mánu with the ritual of sacrifice is so strong that those who do not sacrifice are named amanuṣāḥ, which means 'not belonging to Mánu', 'unlike Mánu', or 'inhuman'. The Song of Puruṣa (another word meaning 'man') tells how the body parts of the sacrificed primeval man led to the creation of the cosmos (the heaven from his head, the air from his navel, the earth from his legs) and the Hindu castes (the upper parts becoming the upper castes and the lower parts the commoners). In the later Śatapatha Brāhmana, both a primordial bull and Mánu's wife Manāvī are sacrificed by the Asuras (demi-gods). According to Lincoln, this could represent an independent variant of the original myth, with the figure of Yama laying behind that of Manāvī.

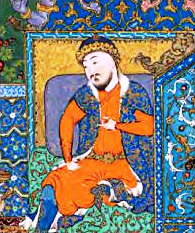
The Iranian mythical king Yima. c. 1522.

After a religious transformation led by Zarathustra around the 7th–6th centuries BC that degraded the status of prior myths and deities, *Manuš was replaced in the Iranian tradition with three different figures: Ahriman, who took his role as first sacrificer; Manūščihr ('son' or 'seed of Manuš'), who replaced him as ancestor of the priestly line; and Zarathustra himself, who took his role as priest par excellence. Manūščihr is described in the Greater Bun-dahišnīh as the ancestor of all Mōpats ('High Priests') of Pars, and it has been proposed that *Manuš was originally regarded as the First Priest instead of Zarathustra by pre-Zoroastrian tribes.

The Indo-Iranian tradition portrays the first mortal man or king, *YamHa, as the son of the solar deity, *Hui-(H)uas-uant. Invoked in funeral hymns of the Rigveda, Yama is depicted as the first man to die, the one who established the path towards death after he freely chose his own departure from life. Although his realm was originally associated with feasting, beauty and happiness, Yama was gradually portrayed as a horrific being and the ruler of the otherworld in the Epic and Puranic traditions. Some scholars have equated this abandonment (or transcendence) of his own body with the sacrifice of Puruṣa. In a motif shared with the Iranian tradition, which is touched in the Rigveda and told in later traditions, Yama and his twin sister Yamī are presented as the children of the sun-god Vivasvat. Discussing the advisability of incest in a primordial context, Yamī insists on having sexual intercourse with her brother Yama, who rejects it, thus forgoing his role as the creator of humankind.

In pre-Zoroastrian Iran, Yima was seen as the first king and first mortal. The original myth of creation was indeed condemned by Zarathustra, who makes mention of it in the Avesta when talking about the two spirits that "appeared in the beginning as two twins in a dream... (and) who first met and instituted life and non-life". Yima in particular is depicted as the first to distribute portions of the cow for consumption, and is explicitly condemned for having introduced the eating of meat. After a brief reign on earth, the king Yima was said in a later tradition to be deprived of his triple royal nimbus, which embodied the three social classes in Iranian myths. Mithra receives the part of the Priest, Thraētona that of the Warrior, and Kərəsāspa that of the Commoner. The saga ends with the real dismemberment of Yima by his own brother, the daiwic figure Spityura. In another myth of the Younger Avesta, the primal man Gayōmart (Gaya marətan; 'Mortal Life') and the primeval world ox Gōšūrvan are sacrificed by the destructive spirit Ahriman (Aŋra Mainyu, 'Evil Spirit'). From the ox's parts came all the plants and animals, and from Gayōmart's body the minerals and humankind. In the Vīdēvdāt, Yima is presented as the builder of an underworld, a sub-terrestrial paradise eventually ruled by Zarathustra and his son. The story, giving a central position to the new religious leader, is once again probably the result of a Zoroastrian reformation of the original myth, and Yima might have been seen as the ruler of the realm of the dead in the early Iranian tradition. Norbert Oettinger argues that the story of Yima and the Vara was originally a flood myth, and the harsh winter was added in due to the dry nature of Eastern Iran and Afghanistan, as flood myths didn't have as much of an effect as harsh winters. He has argued that the Videvdad 2.24's mention of melted water flowing is a remnant of the flood myth, and mentions that the Indian flood myths originally had their protagonist as Yama, but it was changed to Manu later in the Puranas, particularly the Vishnu Purana.

== Legacy ==
The motif of Manu and Yemo has been influential throughout Eurasia following the Indo-European migrations. The Greek, Old Russian (Poem on the Dove King) depend on the Iranian, and a Chinese version of the myth has been introduced from Ancient India. The Armenian version of the myth of the First Warrior Trito depends on the Iranian, and the Roman reflexes were influenced by earlier Greek versions.

Baltic mythology records a fertility deity Jumis, whose name means 'pair, double (of fruits)'. His name is also considered a cognate to Indo-Iranian Yama, and related to Sanskrit yamala 'in pairs, twice' and Prakrit yamala 'twins'. Ranko Matasović cites the existence of Jumala as a female counterpart and sister of Jumis in Latvian dainas (folksongs), as another fertility deity, and in the same vein, Zmago Smitek mentioned the pair as having "pronounced vegetational characteristics". Jumis, whose name can also mean 'double ear of wheat', is also considered a Latvian chthonic deity that lived "beneath the plowed field".

Later Iranian tradition (Pahlavi) attests a brother–sister pair named Jima (Yima) and Jimak (Yimak). Yimak, or Jamag, is described as Yima's twin sister in the Bundahishn, from Central Iran. Yima consorts with his sister Yimak to produce humankind, but is later killed by Azi Dahaka.

The name Yama is attested as a compound in personal names of the historical Persepolis Administrative Archives, such as Yamakka and Yamakšedda (from Old Persian Yama-xšaita- 'majestic Yama', modern Jamshid).

Nuristani deity Imra is also considered a reflex of Indo-Iranian Yama. The name Imra is thought to derive from *Yama-raja 'King Yama', a name possibly cognate to the Bangani title Jim Raza 'god of the dead'. He is also known as Mara "Killer, Death". This name may have left traces in other Nuristani languages: Waigali Yamrai, Kalash (Urtsun) imbro, Ashkun im'ra, Prasun yumr'a and Kati im'ro – all referring to a "creator god". This deity also acts as the guardian to the gates of hell (located in a subterranean realm), preventing the return to the world of the living – a motif that echoes the role of Yama as the king of the underworld.

Linguist and comparativist Jaan Puhvel proposed that the characters of "Man" and "Twin" are present in Proto-Latin under the names of Romulus and Remus (from *Yemo[no]s). The former was deified as god Quirinus, a name he considered to be ultimately derived from *wihₓrós ('man'). (Note: On a related note, academic John T. Koch suggests that a figure named Euron, attested in the poem Cad Goddeu in relation to Welsh goddess Modron, may ultimately derive from *u̯ironos 'the divine man, hero'.)

Following Puhvel's line of argument, Belarusian scholar Siarhiej Sanko attempted to find a Proto-Baltic related pair, possibly named Jumis ('twin') and Viras ('male, hero'). He saw a connection with quasi-historical Prussian king Widewuto and his brother Bruteno. Related to them is a pair of figures named Wirschaitos and Szwaybrutto (Iszwambrato, Schneybrato, Schnejbrato, Snejbrato), which he interprets as 'Elder' and 'His Brother', respectively. These latter two would, in turn, be connected to the worship, by the Prussians, of stone statues erected during their expansion in the 12th and 13th centuries.

Vaclav Blažek suggests that the Greek Iamos may be related to the Indo-Iranian *Yama-.

== See also ==
- Indo-European cosmogony
- Numa Pompilius
- Proto-Indo-European mythology
- Romulus and Remus
- Trito

== Bibliography ==
- Anthony, David W. (2007). The Horse, the Wheel, and Language: How Bronze-Age Riders from the Eurasian Steppes Shaped the Modern World. Princeton University Press. ISBN 978-1400831104.
- Anthony, David W.; Brown, Dorcas R. (2019). "Late Bronze Age midwinter dog sacrifices and warrior initiations at Krasnosamarskoe, Russia". In Olsen, Birgit A.; Olander, Thomas; Kristiansen, Kristian (eds.). Tracing the Indo-Europeans: New Evidence from Archaeology and Historical Linguistics. Oxbow Books. ISBN 978-1-78925-273-6.
- Arvidsson, Stefan (2006). Aryan Idols: Indo-European Mythology as Ideology and Science. University of Chicago Press. ISBN 0-226-02860-7.
- Beekes, Robert S. P. (2009). Etymological Dictionary of Greek. Brill. ISBN 978-90-04-32186-1.
- Beekes, Robert S. P. (2011). Comparative Indo-European Linguistics: An Introduction. John Benjamins Publishing. ISBN 9789027211859.
- Benveniste, Emile (1973). Indo-European Language and Society. Translated by Palmer, Elizabeth. Coral Gables, Florida: University of Miami Press. ISBN 978-0-87024-250-2.
- Burkert, Walter (1985). Greek Religion. Cambridge, Massachusetts: Harvard University Press. ISBN 0-674-36281-0.
- Delamarre, Xavier (2003). Dictionnaire de la langue gauloise: Une approche linguistique du vieux-celtique continental (in French). Editions Errance. ISBN 9782877723695.
- Derksen, Rick (2008). Etymological Dictionary of the Slavic Inherited Lexicon. Brill. ISBN 9789004155046.
- Dumézil, Georges (1996) [1966]. Archaic Roman Religion: With an Appendix on the Religion of the Etruscans. Johns Hopkins University Press. ISBN 978-0-8018-5482-8.
- Dumézil, Georges (1986). Mythe et épopée: L'idéologie des trois fonctions dans les épopées des peuples indo-européens (in French). Gallimard. ISBN 978-2-07-026961-7.
- Fortson, Benjamin W. (2004). Indo-European Language and Culture. Blackwell Publishing. ISBN 1-4051-0316-7.
- Gamkrelidze, Thomas V.; Ivanov, Vjaceslav V. (1995). Winter, Werner (ed.). Indo-European and the Indo-Europeans: A Reconstruction and Historical Analysis of a Proto-Language and a Proto-Culture. Trends in Linguistics: Studies and Monographs" series. Vol. 80. Berlin: Mouton de Gruyter.
- Haudry, Jean (1987). La religion cosmique des Indo-Européens (in French). Archè. ISBN 978-2-251-35352-4.
- Jackson, Peter (2002). "Light from Distant Asterisks: Towards a Description of the Indo-European Religious Heritage". Numen. 49 (1): 61–102. doi:10.1163/15685270252772777. JSTOR 3270472.
- Jakobson, Roman (1985). "Linguistic Evidence in Comparative Mythology". In Rudy, Stephen (ed.). Selected Writings. Vol. VII: Contributions to Comparative Mythology: Studies in Linguistics and Philology, 1972–1982. Walter de Gruyter. ISBN 9783110855463.
- Kurkjian, Vahan M. (1958). "History of Armenia: Chapter XXXIV". Penelope. University of Chicago.
- Leeming, David A. (2009). Creation Myths of the World: An Encyclopedia. Vol. 1. ABC-CLIO. ISBN 9781598841749.
- Littleton, C. Scott (1982). "From swords in the earth to the sword in the stone: A possible reflection of an Alano-Sarmatian rite of passage in the Arthurian tradition". In Polomé, Edgar C. (ed.). Homage to Georges Dumézil. Journal of Indo-European Studies / Institute for the Study of Man. pp. 53–68. ISBN 9780941694285.
- Lincoln, Bruce (November 1975). "The Indo-European Myth of Creation". History of Religions. 15 (2): 121–145. doi:10.1086/462739. S2CID 162101898.
- Lincoln, Bruce (August 1976). "The Indo-European Cattle-Raiding Myth". History of Religions. 16 (1): 42–65. doi:10.1086/462755. JSTOR 1062296. S2CID 162286120.
- Lincoln, Bruce (1991). Death, War, and Sacrifice: Studies in Ideology and Practice. University of Chicago Press. ISBN 978-0226482002.
- Mallory, James P. (1991). In Search of the Indo-Europeans. London: Thames & Hudson. ISBN 978-0-500-27616-7.
- Mallory, James P.; Adams, Douglas Q. (1997). Encyclopedia of Indo-European Culture. London: Routledge. ISBN 978-1-884964-98-5.
- Mallory, James P.; Adams, Douglas Q. (2006). The Oxford Introduction to Proto-Indo-European and the Proto-Indo-European World. Oxford University Press. ISBN 978-0-19-929668-2.
- Matasović, Ranko (2009). Etymological Dictionary of Proto-Celtic. Brill. ISBN 9789004173361.
- Parpola, Asko (2015). The Roots of Hinduism: The Early Aryans and the Indus Civilization. Oxford University Press. ISBN 9780190226923.
- Polomé, Edgar C. (1986). "The Background of Germanic Cosmogonic Myths". In Brogyanyi, Bela; Krömmelbein, Thomas (eds.). Germanic Dialects: Linguistic and Philological Investigations. John Benjamins Publishing. ISBN 978-90-272-7946-0.
- Puhvel, Jaan (1987). Comparative Mythology. Baltimore: Johns Hopkins University Press. ISBN 978-0-8018-3938-2.
- Renfrew, Colin (1987). Archaeology & Language. The Puzzle of the Indo-European Origins. London: Jonathan Cape. ISBN 978-0-521-35432-5.
- Telegrin, D. Ya.; Mallory, James P. (1994). The Anthropomorphic Stelae of the Ukraine: The Early Iconography of the Indo-Europeans. Journal of Indo-European Studies Monographs. Vol. 11. Washington, DC: Institute for the Study of Man. ISBN 978-0941694452.
- Tirta, Mark (2004). Bezhani, Petrit (ed.). Mitologjia ndër shqiptarë (in Albanian). Tirana: Mësonjëtorja. ISBN 99927-938-9-9.
- Treimer, Karl (1971). "Zur Rückerschliessung der illyrischen Götterwelt und ihre Bedeutung für die südslawische Philologie". In Henrik Barić (ed.). Arhiv za Arbanasku starinu, jezik i etnologiju. Vol. I. R. Trofenik. pp. 27–33.
- Watkins, Calvert (1995). How to Kill a Dragon: Aspects of Indo-European Poetics. Oxford University Press. ISBN 978-0-19-514413-0.
- West, Martin L. (2007). Indo-European Poetry and Myth. Oxford University Press. ISBN 978-0-19-928075-9.
- Winter, Werner (2003). Language in Time and Space. Berlin: Walter de Gruyter. ISBN 978-3-11-017648-3.
- Witzel, Michael (2012). The Origins of the World's Mythologies. Oxford University Press. ISBN 978-0-19-981285-1.
- York, Michael (1988). "Romulus and Remus, Mars and Quirinus". Journal of Indo-European Studies. 16 (1–2): 153–172. ISSN 0092-2323.
