= Indo-European cosmogony =

Proto-Indo-European myth of creation

The Indo-European cosmogony refers to the creation myth of the reconstructed Proto-Indo-European mythology.

The comparative analysis of different Indo-European tales has led scholars to reconstruct an original Proto-Indo-European creation myth involving twin brothers, *Manu and *Yemo ('Man' and 'Twin') as the progenitors of the world and mankind, and a hero named 'the Third' (*Tritós) who ensured the continuity of the original sacrifice.

Although some thematic parallels can be made with the ancient Near East (the primordial couple Adam and Eve), and even Polynesian or South American legends, the linguistic correspondences found in descendant cognates of *Manu and *Yemo make it very likely the myth has a Proto-Indo-European (PIE) origin.

== Historiography ==
Hermann Güntert, stressing philological parallels between the Germanic and Indo-Iranian texts, argued in 1923 for an inherited Indo-European motif of the creation of the world from the sacrifice and dismemberment of a primordial androgyne.

Following a first paper on the cosmogonical legend of Manu and Yemo, published simultaneously with Jaan Puhvel in 1975 (who pointed out the Roman reflex of the story), Bruce Lincoln assembled the initial part of the myth with the legend of the third man Trito in a single ancestral motif.

Since the 1970s, the reconstructed motifs of Manu and Yemo, and to a lesser extent that of Trito, have been generally accepted among scholars.

== Myths ==
=== Primordial state ===
The basic Indo-European root for the divine creation is *d^{h}eh_{1}, 'to set in place, lay down, or establish', as attested in the Hittite expression nēbis dēgan dāir ("...established heaven (and) earth"), the Young Avestan formula kə huvāpå raocåscā dāt təmåscā? ("What skillful artificer made the regions of light and dark?"), the name of the Vedic creator god Dhātr, and possibly in the Greek name Thetis, presented as a demiurgical goddess in Alcman's poetry. The concept of the cosmic egg, symbolizing the primordial state from which the universe arises, is also found in many Indo-European creation myths. A similar depiction of the appearance of the universe before the act of creation is given in the Vedic, Germanic and, at least partly, in the Greek tradition.

Rigveda 10:129 (trans. Doniger): There was neither non-existence nor existence then there was neither the realm of space nor the sky which is beyond... There was neither death nor immortality then. There was no distinguishing sign of night nor of day.	Wessobrun Prayer (trans. Blind):...neither earth there was, nor sky above; Nor tree, nor hill there was. Nor stars there were; nor shone the sun. Nor moon-light there was, nor the salty sea. Nothing there was: neither end, nor limit	Völuspá (trans. Bellows): Sea nor cool waves nor sand there were Earth had not been, nor heaven above, But a yawning gap, and grass nowhere.

Although the idea of a created world is untypical of early Greek thinking, similar descriptions have been highlighted in Aristophanes's The Birds: "...there was Chasm and Night and dark Erebos at first, and broad Tartarus, but earth nor air nor heaven there was..." The analogy between the Greek Χάος ('Chaos, Chasm') and the Norse Ginnungagap ('Gaping abyss') has also been noted by scholars. The importance of heat in Germanic creation myths has also been compared with similar Indian beliefs emphasized in the Vedic hymn on 'cosmic heat'.

=== Cosmic sacrifice ===
The first man Manu and his giant twin Yemo are crossing the cosmos, accompanied by a primordial cow. To create the world, Manu sacrifices his brother and, with the help of heavenly deities (*Dyēus, the proto-Indo-European thunder god, and the divine twins), forges both the natural elements and humans from his twin's remains. Manu thus becomes the first priest, having initiated sacrifice as the primordial condition for the world order. His deceased brother Yemo turns into the first king as social classes emerge from his anatomy (the priesthood from his head, the warrior class from his breast and arms, and the commoners from his sexual organs and legs).

Although the European and Indo-Iranian versions differ on this matter, the primeval cow was most likely sacrificed in the original myth, giving birth to the other animals and vegetables. Yemo may have become the King of the Otherworld, the realm of the dead, as the first mortal to die in the primordial sacrifice, a role suggested by the Indo-Iranian and, to a lesser extent, in the Germanic, Greek and Celtic traditions.

=== First Warrior ===
To the third man Trito, the celestial gods offer cattle as a divine gift, which is stolen by a three-headed serpent named *H₂n̥gʷʰis (both 'serpent' and the root for negation).

Trito first suffers at his hands, but fortified by an intoxicating drink and aided by a helper-god (the thunder god or *H_{a}ner, 'Man'), together they go to a cave or a mountain, and the hero finally manages to overcome the monster. Trito then returns the recovered cattle to a priest for proper sacrifice. He is now the first warrior, maintaining through his heroic deeds the cycle of mutual giving between gods and mortals.

== Interpretations ==
=== Three Functions ===
According to Lincoln, Manu and Yemo seem to be the protagonists of "a myth of the sovereign function, establishing the model for later priests and kings", while the legend of Trito should be seen as "a myth of the warrior function, establishing the model for all later men of arms". He has thus interpreted the narrative as an expression of the priests's and kings's attempt to justify their role as indispensable for the preservation of the cosmos, and therefore as essential for the organization of society. The motif indeed recalls the Dumézilian tripartition of the cosmos between the priest (in both his magical and legal aspects), the warrior (the Third Man), and the herder (the cow).

=== Primeval hermaphrodite ===
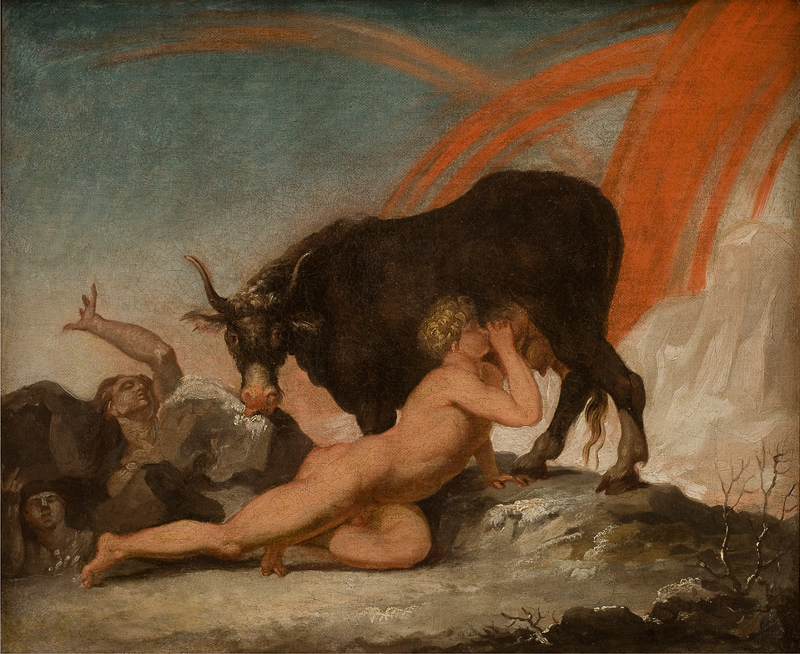
Ymir sucking the milk of the primeval cow Auðumbla. 1790.

Some scholars have proposed that the primeval being Yemo was depicted as a two-folded hermaphrodite rather than a twin brother of Manu, both forming indeed a pair of complementary beings entwined together. The Germanic names Ymir and Tuisto were understood as twin, bisexual or hermaphrodite, and some myths give a sister to the Vedic Yama, also called Yamī ('Twin'). The primordial being may therefore have self-sacrificed, or have been divided in two, a male half and a female half, embodying a prototypal separation of the sexes that continued the primordial union of the male *Dyēus 'Sky' with the female Dhéǵhōm 'Earth'.

=== Cattle-raiding myth ===
The story of Trito served as a model for later cattle raiding epic myths and most likely as a moral justification for the practice of raiding among Indo-European peoples. In their legends, Trito is portrayed as taking back only what rightfully belongs to his people, those who properly sacrifice to the gods. Although cattle raiding is a common theme found in all societies keeping cattle, it was particularly popular among Indo-European peoples, as attested by the legends of Indra and the Panis, Beowulf and Grendel, the quest of Queen Medb for the Bull, or Odysseus hunting down the cattle of Helios.

The myth has been variously interpreted as a cosmic conflict between a heavenly hero and an earthly serpent; as a depiction of the male fellowships' struggle to protect society against external evil; or as an Indo-European victory over non-Indo-European people, the monster symbolizing the aboriginal thief or usurper. The Vedic serpent Vṛtrá is indeed described as a *dāsa, a hostile indigene inimical to the Indo-European invaders; the Iranian serpent Aži Dahāka carries in his name the pejorative suffix -ka; and the Latin inimical giant Cācus is also depicted as an incola, a hostile indigene, hostile to Romans and Greeks alike. According to Martin Litchfield West, the Proto-Indo-European name *Trito 'Third' may have been a "poetic or hieratic code-name, fully comprehensible only with specialized knowledge".

== Linguistic evidence ==
=== Manu and Yemo ===
Cognates deriving from the pIE first priest *Manu ('Human', the ancestor of humanity) include the Indic Mánu, the legendary first man and Manāvī, his sacrificed wife; the Germanic Mannus (from Germ. *Manwaz), mythical ancestor of the West Germanic tribes; and the Persian Manūščihr (from Avestan Manūš.čiθra, 'son of Manuš'), the Zoroastrian high priest of the 9th century.

From the name of the sacrificed First King *Yemo 'Twin' derive the Indic Yama, god of death and the underworld; the Avestan Yima, king of the Golden Age and guardian of hell; the Norse deity Ymir (from proto-Germanic *Yumiyáz), ancestor of the jǫtnar 'giants', and most likely Remus (from proto-Italic *Yemos), who is killed in the myth of the Founding of Rome by his twin brother, Rōmulus. archaic Latvian Jumis 'doubled plant or twin fruit', Latin geminus 'twin', and Middle Irish emuin 'twin') are also linguistically related.

Indo-European linguistic descendants (in bold) and thematic echoes (in italic) of the creation myth.
Tradition	First Priest	First King	First mammal	Heavenly gods
Proto-Indo-European	***Manu** ('Man')	***Yemo** ('Twin')	Primordial Cow	*Dyēus, pIE thunder god, divine twins
Indian	**Mánu**, Puruṣa	**Yama**, (Manāvī)	Manu's bull	The Vedic gods
Iranian	Ahriman, Spityura, **Manūš**čihr	**Yima**, Gayōmart	Primordial Ox (Gōšūrvan)	–
Germanic	**Mannus**	**Ymir**, Tuisto	Primordial Cow (Auðhumla)	Óðinn and his brothers
Roman	Rōmulus	***Yemos (Remus)**	She-wolf	The senators

=== Trito and *h₂n̥gʷʰis ===
Cognates stemming from the First Warrior *Trito 'Third' include the Vedic Trita, the hero who recovered the cattle from the cattle raid by Vṛtrá; the Avestan Thraētona 'son of Thrita', who won back the women abducted from the serpent Aži Dahāka; and the Norse þriði 'Third', one of the names of Óðinn. Other cognates may appear in the Greek expressions trítos sōtḗr (Ancient Greek: τρίτος σωτήρ, lit. 'Third Saviour'), an epithet of Zeus, and tritogḗneia (Ancient Greek: τριτογήνεια, lit. 'thirdborn'), an epithet of Athena; and perhaps in the Slavic mythical hero Troyan, found in Russian and Serbian legends alike. (Note: Troyan has been tentatively connected to numeral "try" 'three', Ukrainian troian 'father of triplets/three sons', or considered a possible guardian deity of Russia in pre-Christian times.)

*H₂n̥gʷʰis 'serpent' is also related to the Indo-European root for negation (*ne-). Descendent cognates can be found in the Iranian Aži, the name of the inimical serpent, and in the Indic áhi ('serpent'), a term used to designate Vṛtrá, both descending from proto-Indo-Iranian *aj'hi.

Indo-European linguistic descendants (in bold) and thematic echoes (in italic) of the myth of the First Warrior.
Tradition	First Warrior	Three-headed Serpent	Helper God	Stolen present
Proto-Indo-European	***Trito** ('Third')	***h₂n̥gʷʰis**	The PIE thunder god or h_{2}nēr 'man, male person'	Cattle
Indian	**Trita**	Vṛtrá ('**áhi**')	Indra	Cows
Iranian	Thraētona ('son of **Thrita**')	**Aži** Dahāka	Vr̥traghna	Women
Germanic	**Þriði**, Hymir	Three serpents	Þórr	Goats (?)
Graeco-Roman	Herakles	Geryon, Cācus	Helios	Cattle

== Comparative mythology ==
Many Indo-European beliefs explain aspects of human anatomy from the results of the original dismemberment of Yemo: his flesh usually becomes the earth, his hair grass, his bone yields stone, his blood water, his eyes the sun, his mind the moon, his brain the clouds, his breath the wind, and his head the heavens. The traditions of sacrificing an animal before dispersing its parts following socially established patterns, a custom found in Ancient Rome and India, has been interpreted as an attempt to restore the balance of the cosmos ruled by the original sacrifice.

In the Indo-Iranian version of the myth, his brother Manu also sacrifices the cow, and from the parts of the dead animal are born the other living species and vegetables. In the European reflexes, however, the cow (represented by a she-wolf in the Roman myth) serves only as a provider of milk and care for the twins before the creation. This divergence may be explained by the cultural differences between the Indo-Iranian and European branches of the Indo-European family, with the former still strongly influenced by pastoralism, and the latter much more agricultural, perceiving the cow mainly as a source of milk. According to Lincoln, the Indo-Iranian version best preserves the ancestral motif, since they lived closer to the original Proto-Indo-European pastoral way of life.

=== Indo-Iranian ===
==== Creation myth ====
Mánu ('Man, human') appears in the Rigveda as the first sacrificer and the founder of religious law, the Manusmriti. He is the brother (or half-brother) of Yama 'Twin', both presented as the sons of the solar deity Vivasvat. The association of Mánu with the ritual of sacrifice is so strong that those who do not sacrifice are named amanuṣāḥ, meaning 'not belonging to Mánu', 'unlike Mánu', or 'inhuman'. The Song of Puruṣa (another word meaning 'man') tells how the body parts of the sacrificed primeval man led to the creation of the cosmos (the heaven from his head, the air from his navel, the earth from his legs) and the caste system (the upper parts becoming the upper castes and the lower parts the commoners). In the later Śatapatha Brāhmana, both a primordial bull and Mánu's wife Manāvī are sacrificed by the Asuras (demi-gods). According to Lincoln, this could represent an independent variant of the original myth, with the figure of Yama laying behind that of Manāvī.

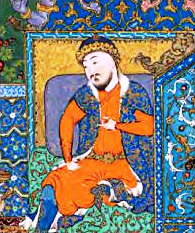
The Iranian mythical king Yima. c. 1522.

After a religious transformation led by Zarathustra around the 7th–6th centuries BC that degraded the status of prior myths and deities, *Manuš was replaced in the Iranian tradition with three different figures: Ahriman, who took his role as first sacrificer; Manūščihr ('son' or 'seed of Manuš'), who replaced him as ancestor of the priestly line; and Zarathustra himself, who took his role as priest par excellence. Manūščihr is described in the Greater Bun-dahišnīh as the ancestor of all Mōpats ('High Priests') of Pars, and it has been proposed that *Manuš was originally regarded as the First Priest instead of Zarathustra by pre-Zoroastrian tribes.

The Indo-Iranian tradition portrays the first mortal man or king, *YamHa, as the son of the solar deity, *Hui-(H)uas-uant. Invoked in funeral hymns of the Rigveda, Yama is depicted as the first man to die, the one who established the path towards death after he freely chose his own departure from life. Although his realm was originally associated with feasting, beauty and happiness, Yama was gradually portrayed as a horrific being and the ruler of the Otherworld in the epic and puranic traditions. Some scholars have equated this abandonment (or transcendence) of his own body with the sacrifice of Puruṣa. In a motif shared with the Iranian tradition, which is touched in the Rigveda and told in later traditions, Yama and his twin sister Yamī are presented as the children of the sun-god Vivasvat. Discussing the advisability of incest in a primordial context, Yamī insists on having sexual intercourse with her brother Yama, who rejects it, thus forgoing his role as the creator of humankind.

In pre-Zoroastrian Iran, Yima was seen as the first king and first mortal. The original myth of creation was indeed condemned by Zarathustra, who makes mention of it in the Avesta when talking about the two spirits that "appeared in the beginning as two twins in a dream ... (and) who first met and instituted life and non-life". Yima in particular is depicted as the first to distribute portions of the cow for consumption, and is explicitly condemned for having introduced the eating of meat. After a brief reign on earth, the king Yima was said in a later tradition to be deprived of his triple royal nimbus, which embodied the three social classes in Iranian myths. Mithra receives the part of the Priest, Thraētona that of the Warrior, and Kərəsāspa that of the Commoner. The saga ends with the real dismemberment of Yima by his own brother, the daiwic figure Spityura. In another myth of the Younger Avesta, the primal man Gayōmart 'Mortal Life', and the primeval world ox Gōšūrvan are sacrificed by the destructive spirit Ahriman 'Evil Spirit'. From the ox's parts came all the plants and animals, and from Gayōmart's body the minerals and humankind.

In the Vīdēvdāt, Yima is presented as the builder of an underworld, a sub-terrestrial paradise eventually ruled by Zarathustra and his son. The story, giving a central position to the new religious leader, is once again probably the result of a Zoroastrian reformation of the original myth, and Yima might have been seen as the ruler of the realm of the dead in the early Iranian tradition. Norbert Oettinger argues that the story of Yima and the Vara was originally a flood myth, and the harsh winter was added in due to the dry nature of Eastern Iran, as flood myths didn't have as much of an effect as harsh winters. He has argued that the Videvdad 2.24's mention of melted water flowing is a remnant of the flood myth, and notes that the Indian flood myths originally had their protagonist as Yama, but it was later changed to Manu.

==== Trita Atpya ====
Both the Rigveda and the Younger Avesta depict the slaying of a three-headed serpent by a hero named Trita Āptya or Thraēta(ona) Āthwya for the recovery of cattle or women. *Atpya may refer to the name of an Indo-Iranian family of heroes. Both heroes are known as the preparers of the Indo-Iranian sacred beverage, the *sauma, which *Trita Atpya probably drank to obtain god-like powers. The Greek story of Herakles recovering the stolen cattle from the three-headed monster Geryon is likely related, and a Germanic reflex may be found in the Migration Period depiction of a three-head man fighting three serpents while holding a goat on the Golden Horns of Gallehus.

In the Vedic tradition, Trita Āptya and the god Indra maintain a relationship of mutual assistance, Trita giving soma to the god so that he can, in return, provide help to the hero in his fight against the monster Vṛtrá. The hero confronts the three-headed dragon (áhi-) and kills him to let the cows go out. Finally, Indra cuts off three heads of Vṛtrá and drives the cows home for Trita.

In the Younger Avestan, the stolen cattle was replaced with his two beautiful wives (vantā), said to have been abducted by the serpent Aži Dahāka and whom the hero Thraētona ('son of Thrita') eventually wins back after confronting the monster. Vantā, which means 'female who is desired', has been compared with Indo-Iranian *dhainu ('one who lactates, gives milk'), a frequent word for 'cow' also used to designate female humans. Although Thraētona was aided in his quest by several deities, the pre-Zoroastrian warrior-god *Vr̥traghna ('Smasher of Resistance') appears to be the most probable helper-god in the original Iranian myth, since it was the name borrowed as Vahagn in the Armenian version of the story.

=== Graeco-Roman ===
The Roman writer Livy relates the murder of Remus by his brother Rōmulus during the legendary founding of Rome following a disagreement about which hill to build the city on. In a version of the myth, Rōmulus himself is said to have been torn limb-from-limb by a group of senators for being a tyrant, which may represent a reflex of the gods who sacrificed the twin giant in the original motif. Like in the Proto-Indo-European myth, the sacrifice of Remus (Yemos) led to a symbolical creation of humankind, represented by the birth of the three Roman 'tribes' (the Ramnes, Luceres and Tities), and to the enthronement of his brother as the 'First King'.

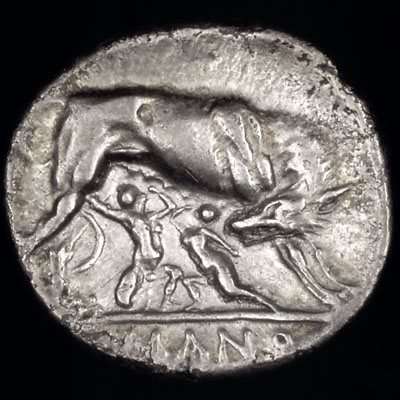
Rōmulus and Remus sucking at the udder of the mother she-wolf. c. 269–266 BC.

It is likely that Remus was originally seen as the main protagonist of the Latin myth, since the formula initially went by Remo et Romulo, and his name was often used as an elliptical replacement for the whole couple, such as in Remi nepotes ("descendants of Remus"), a poetic name for the Romans. While the name Rōmulus is interpreted as a back-formation of the city name Rōma, Remus is derived from PIE *Yemo, via an intermediary Proto-Latin form *Yemos or *Yemonos. The initial 'y' sound may have shifted to 'r' as a result of long and frequent associations with the names Roma and Rōmulus in Latin myths. In the legend reported by Livy, Rōmulus and Remus were nurtured as infants by a she-wolf, a motif that parallels the cow nourishing Ymir in the Old Norse version.

Some scholars have proposed that the original motifs of Yemo, the Proto-Indo-European sacrificed twin ancestor and ruler of the dead, have been transferred in Greek mythology to three different figures: Kronos, Rhadamanthys and Menealos.

A possible reflex of the original legend of the Third Man *Trito may be found in a Greek myth told by Hesiod. A three-headed monster named Geryon, the grandson of Medusa (the serpent-haired Gorgon), is said to have been killed by Herakles to recover a stolen cattle. The Greek hero is helped by the sun-god Helios, from whom he borrows the cup that helps him cross the western Ocean and reach the island of Erythea. Together with his herdsman Eurytion and his dog, Herakles finally overcomes the monster and drives the cattle back to Greece.

Roman versions of myth, which relied on earlier Greek texts, have been remodelled around an opposition between Hercules and a fire-breathing ogre named Cācus, who lives in a cave on the Aventine. They have nonetheless retained some features of the original three-headed monstrous opponent: Hercules' club, with which he kills Cācus with three strikes, is said to be three-noded; and Hercules runs around the mountain three times after finding the monster's cave, batters the door three times, and sits down to rest three times before finally breaking in. Like in the Iranian and Greek versions, Cācus is portrayed as the one who initially stole the cattle which rightfully belongs to the hero, Hercules.

=== Germanic ===
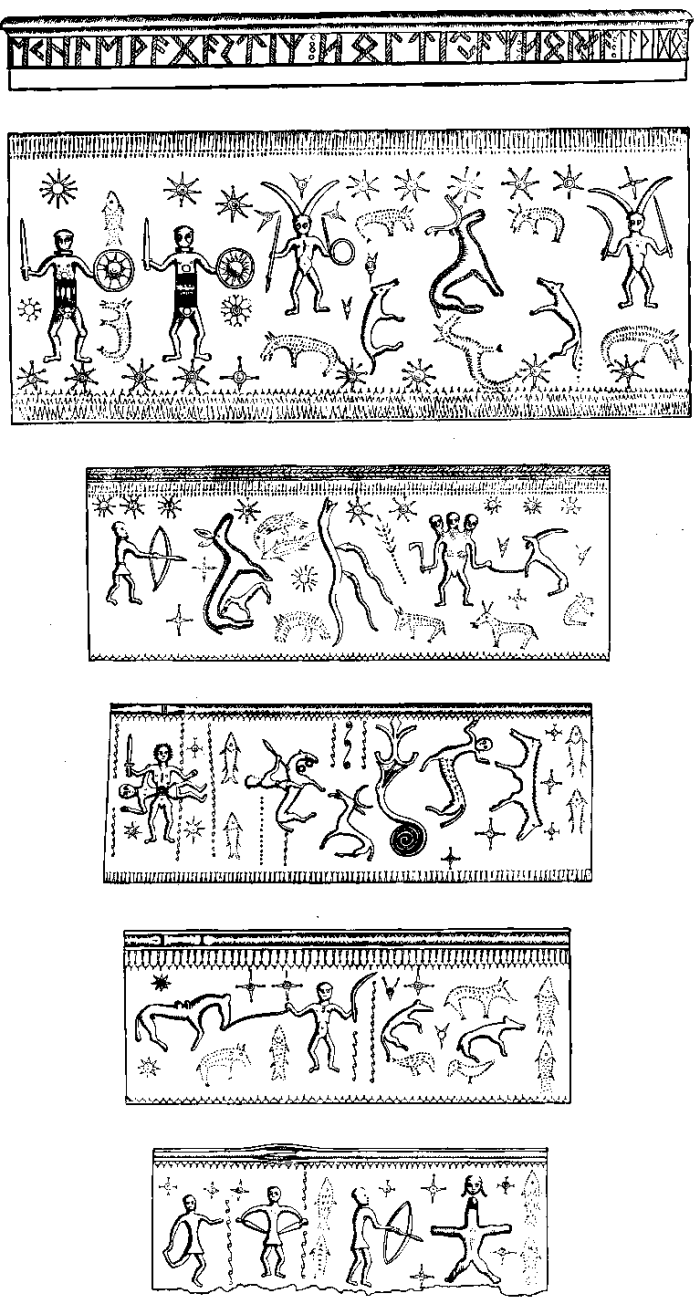
A possible Germanic depiction of the myth of *Trito on the Golden Horns of Gallehus (second from top).

Ymir is depicted in the Eddas as the primal being and a frost jötunn ('giant'). After Óðinn and his brothers killed him, they made the earth out of his flesh, the mountains from his bones, the trees from his hair, the sky from his skull, and the sea and lakes from his blood; and from his two armpits came a man and a woman. The Germanic name Ymir means 'Twin', and some scholars have proposed that it was also understood as hermaphrodite or bisexual. In fact, one of his legs is said to make love to the other one, fathering a six-headed son, the ancestor of the giants. In another Old Norse story, the primeval cow Auðhumla is said to be formed from melting ice like Ymir, and she fed him with her milk.

In his book Germania (ca. 98 AD), Tacitus reports the existence of a myth involving an earth-born god named Tuisto ('Twin') who fathered Mannus ('Man'), the ancestor of West Germanic peoples. Tuisto has begotten Mannus on his own, and his name is also understood to mean hermaphrodite. Some scholars have proposed that the Germanic tribal name Alamanni meant 'Mannus' own people', although 'all-men' remains the most widely accepted etymology among linguists.

A Germanic reflex of myth of Trito fighting the three-headed serpent *H₂n̥gʷʰis may be found on the Golden Horns of Gallehus (5th century), where a three-headed man is portrayed as holding a goat and confronting three serpents. One of the names of Óðinn, Þriði ('Third'), is also linguistically related to *Trito. Another reflex may be found in the Norse legend of the giant Hymir who employed an ox head to capture the serpent Jǫrmungandr with the help of the storm-god Thor.

=== Celtic ===
A possible Celtic reflex of the Proto-Indo-European myth of creation has been proposed in the Irish epic Táin Bó Cúailnge, where two mythical bulls, Donn Cúalnge ('the Dark [bull] of Cooley') and Findbennach Aí ('the White-horned bull of Aí'), fight each other. The battle ends with the former tearing his opponent limb from limb, creating the Irish landscape out of his body. Donn himself dies shortly after the fight from a broken heart, and thereafter also gives his body to form the island's landscape. Julius Caesar reported that the Gaulish believed in a mythical ancestor he compared to Dīs Pater, the Roman god of the underworld. According to some scholars, this could represent a reflex of the original Proto-Indo-European twin ancestor and ruler of the dead *Yemo, a function similar to that held by the Indo-Iranian Yama.

== Parallels and legacy ==
The motif of Manu and Yemo has been influential throughout Eurasia following the Indo-European migrations. The Greek, Old Russian (Poem on the Dove King) and Jewish versions depend on the Iranian, and a Chinese version of the myth has been introduced from Ancient India. The Armenian version of the myth of the First Warrior Trito depends on the Iranian, and the Roman reflexes were influenced by earlier Greek versions.

=== Latin tradition ===
Linguist and comparativist Jaan Puhvel proposed that the characters of "Man" and "Twin" are present in Proto-Latin under the names of Remus (from *Yemo(no)s) and Romulus. The latter was deified as god Quirinus, a name he considered to be ultimately derived from *wihₓrós ('man'). (Note: On a related note, academic John T. Koch suggests that a figure named Euron, attested in the poem Cad Goddeu in relation to Welsh goddess Modron, may ultimately derive from *u̯ironos 'the divine man, hero'.)

=== Baltic mythology ===
Baltic mythology records a fertility deity Jumis, whose name means 'pair, double (of fruits)'. His name is also considered a cognate to Indo-Iranian Yama, and related to Sanskrit yamala 'in pairs, twice' and Prakrit yamala 'twins'. Ranko Matasović cites the existence of Jumala as a female counterpart and sister of Jumis in Latvian dainas (folksongs), as another fertility deity, and in the same vein, Zmago Smitek mentioned the pair as having "pronounced vegetational characteristics". Jumis, whose name can also mean 'double ear of wheat', is also considered a Latvian chthonic deity that lived "beneath the plowed field", or a vegetation spirit connected to the harvest.

Following Puhvel's line of argument, Belarusian scholar Siarhiej Sanko attempted to find a Proto-Baltic related pair, possibly named Jumis ("twin") and Viras ("male, hero"). He saw a connection with (quasi-pseudo-)historical Prussian king Widewuto and his brother Bruteno. Related to them is a pair of figures named Wirschaitos (Note: Similar words in Baltic languages are Yatvingian wurszajtis 'an aged priest offering a goat'; Lithuanian viršáitis 'village-mayor, village-chief, elder in a village', and Latvian virsaitis 'village-mayor'.) and Szwaybrutto (Iszwambrato, Schneybrato, Schnejbrato, Snejbrato) which he interprets as "Elder" and "His Brother", respectively. These latter two would, in turn, be connected to the worship, by the Prussians, of stone statues erected during their expansion in the 12th and 13th centuries.

=== Indo-Iranian tradition ===
Later Iranian tradition (Pahlavi) attests a brother-sister pair named Jima (Yima) and Jimak (Yimak). Yimak, or Jamag, is described as Yima's twin sister in the Bundahishn from Central Iran. Yima consorts with his sister Yimak to produce humankind, but is later killed by Azi Dahaka.

The name Yama is attested as a compound in personal names of the historical Persepolis Administrative Archives, such as Yamakka and Yamakšedda (from Old Persian *Yama-xšaita- 'majestic Yama', modern Jamshid).

Nuristani deity Imra is also considered a reflex of Indo-Iranian Yama. The name Imra is thought to derive from *Yama-raja "King Yama", a name possibly cognate to the Bangani title Jim Raza 'god of the dead'. He is also known as Mara "Killer, Death". This name may have left traces in other Nuristani languages: Waigali Yamrai, Kalash (Urtsun) imbro, Ashkun im'ra, Prasun yumr'a and Kati im'ro – all referring to a "creator god". This deity also acts as the guardian to the gates of hell (located in a subterranean realm), preventing the return to the world of the living - a motif that echoes the role of Yama as the king of the underworld.
