= *Tritós =

Mythological figure

*Tritós is a reconstructed name or epithet for a theoretical figure in Proto-Indo-European mythology which literally means '(the) third (one)', possibly representing the first warrior and acting as a culture hero. He is connected to other prominent characters in Indo-European cosmogony, particularly the celestial twins Manu and Yemo, and is recognized as the protagonist of the myth of the warrior function, establishing the model for all later men of arms. In the legend, *Tritós is offered cattle as a divine gift by celestial gods, which is later stolen by a three-headed serpent named *H₂n̥gʷʰis ('serpent'). Despite initial defeat, *Tritós, fortified by an intoxicating drink and aided by the Sky-Father, or alternatively the Storm-God or *H₂nḗr, 'Man', together they go to a cave or a mountain, and the hero overcomes the monster and returns the recovered cattle to a priest for it to be properly sacrificed. He is now the first warrior, maintaining through his heroic deeds the cycle of mutual giving between gods and mortals. Scholars have interpreted the story of *Tritós either as a cosmic conflict between the heavenly hero and the earthly serpent or as an allegory for Indo-European victory over non-Indo-European people, with the monster symbolizing the aboriginal thief or usurper. *Tritós's character served as a model for later cattle-raiding epic myths and was seen as providing moral justification for cattle raiding. The legend of *Tritós is generally accepted among scholars and is recognized as an essential part of Proto-Indo-European mythology, although not to the level of Manu and Yemo.

== History of research ==
Following a first paper on the cosmogonical legend of Manu and Yemo, published simultaneously with Jaan Puhvel in 1975 (who pointed out the Roman reflex of the story), Bruce Lincoln assembled the initial part of the myth with the legend of the third man *Tritós in a single ancestral motif.

Since the 1970s, the reconstructed motifs of Manu and Yemo, and to a lesser extent that of *Tritós, have been generally accepted among scholars.

== Etymology ==
Cognates stemming from the First Warrior *Tritós ('Third') include the Vedic Trita, the hero who recovered the stolen cattle from the serpent Vṛtrá; the Avestan Thraētona ('son of Thrita'), who won back the abducted women from the serpent Aži Dahāka; and the Norse þriði ('Third'). Other cognates may appear in the Greek expressions trítos sōtḗr (τρίτος σωτήρ; 'Third Saviour'), an epithet of Zeus, and tritogḗneia (τριτογήνεια; 'Third born' or 'born of Zeus'), an epithet of Athena; and perhaps in the Slavic mythical hero Trojan, found in Russian and Serbian legends alike. (Note: Troyan has been tentatively connected to numeral "try" 'three', Ukrainian troian 'father of triplets/three sons', or considered a possible guardian deity of Russia in pre-Christian times.) The name of the hero-king figure called Fereydun in Iranian mythology (including in the religion of Zoroastrianism, Avestan: 𐬚𐬭𐬀𐬉𐬙𐬀𐬊𐬥𐬀 (θraētaona)) is also derived from the same stem.

== Trifunctional hypothesis ==
According to Lincoln the legend of *Tritós should be interpreted as "a myth of the warrior function, establishing the model for all later men of arms". While Manu and Yemo seem to be the protagonists of "a myth of the sovereign function, establishing the model for later priests and kings", The myth indeed recalls the Dumézilian tripartition of the cosmos between the priest (in both his magical and legal aspects), the warrior (the Third Man), and the herder (the cow).

The story of *Tritós served as a model for later cattle raiding epic myths and most likely as a moral justification for the practice of raiding among Indo-European peoples. In the original legend, *Tritós is only taking back what rightfully belongs to his people, those who sacrifice properly to the gods. The myth has been interpreted either as a cosmic conflict between the heavenly hero and the earthly serpent, or as an Indo-European victory over non-Indo-European people, the monster symbolizing the aboriginal thief or usurper.

== Serpent-slaying myth ==
One common myth found in nearly all Indo-European mythologies is a battle ending with a hero or god slaying a serpent or dragon of some sort. Although the details of the story often vary widely, several features remain remarkably the same in all iterations. The protagonist of the story is usually a thunder-god, or a hero somehow associated with thunder. His enemy the serpent is generally associated with water and depicted as multi-headed, or else "multiple" in some other way. Indo-European myths often describe the creature as a "blocker of waters", and his many heads get eventually smashed up by the thunder-god in an epic battle, releasing torrents of water that had previously been pent up. The original legend may have symbolized the Chaoskampf, a clash between forces of order and chaos. The dragon or serpent loses in every version of the story, although in some mythologies, such as the Norse Ragnarök myth, the hero or the god dies with his enemy during the confrontation. Historian Bruce Lincoln has proposed that the dragon-slaying tale and the creation myth of *Tritós killing the serpent *H₂n̥gʷʰis may actually belong to the same original story. Reflexes of the Proto-Indo-European dragon-slaying myth appear in most Indo-European poetic traditions, where the myth has left traces of the formulaic sentence *(h₁e) gʷʰent h₁ógʷʰim, meaning "[he] slew the serpent".

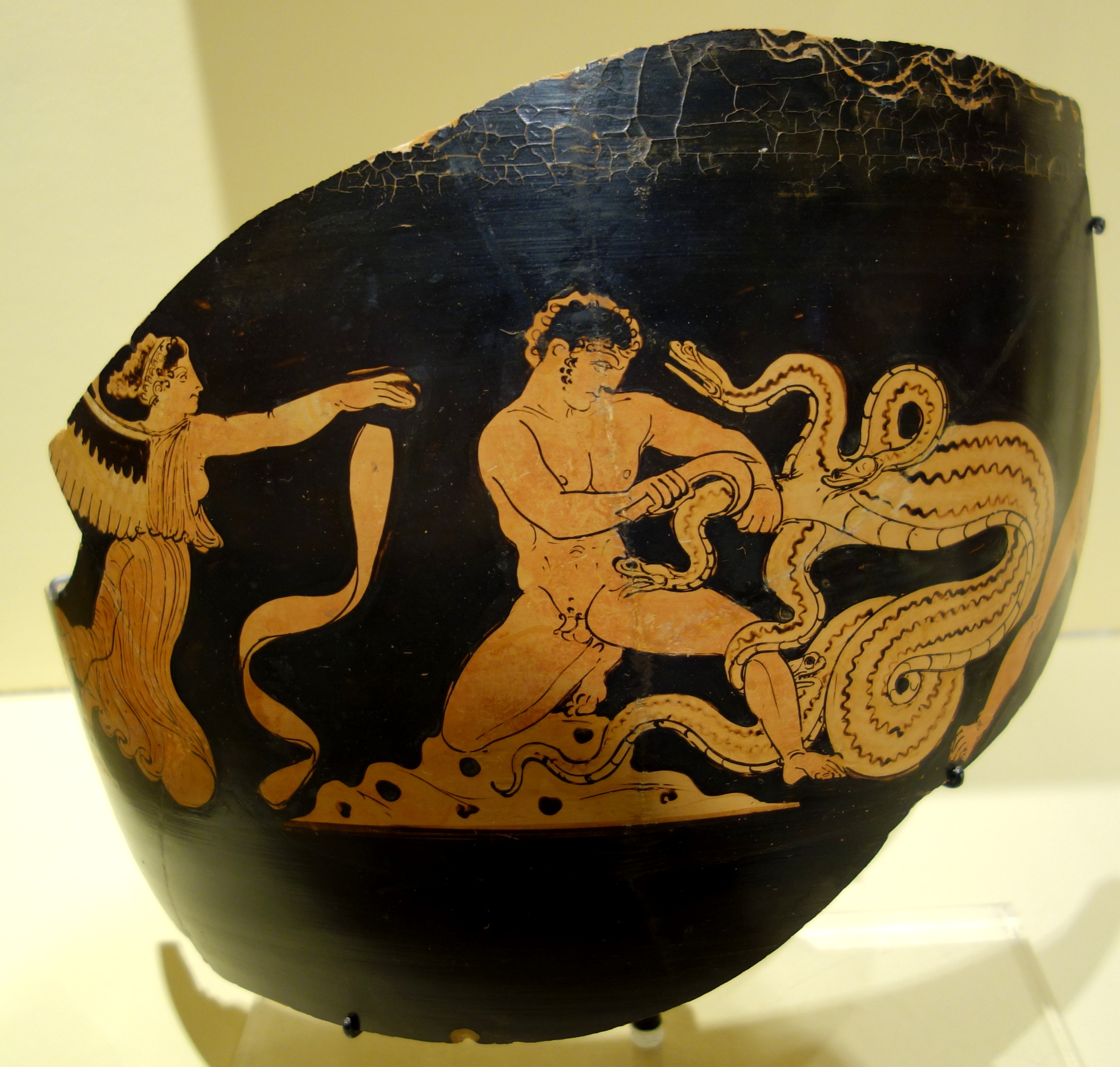
Greek red-figure vase painting depicting Heracles slaying the Lernaean Hydra, c. 375–340 BC.

In Hittite mythology, the storm god Tarhunt slays the giant serpent Illuyanka, as does the Vedic god Indra the multi-headed serpent Vritra, which has been causing a drought by trapping the waters in his mountain lair.

Several variations of the story are also found in Greek mythology. The original motif appears inherited in the legend of Zeus slaying the hundred-headed Typhon, as related by Hesiod in the Theogony, and possibly in the myth of Heracles slaying the nine-headed Lernaean Hydra and in the legend of Apollo slaying the earth-dragon Python. The story of Heracles's theft of the cattle of Geryon is probably also related. Although he is not usually thought of as a storm deity in the conventional sense, Heracles bears many attributes held by other Indo-European storm deities, including physical strength and a knack for violence and gluttony.

The original motif is also reflected in Germanic mythology. The Norse god of thunder Thor slays the giant serpent Jörmungandr, which lived in the waters surrounding the realm of Midgard. In the Völsunga saga, Sigurd slays the dragon Fafnir and, in Beowulf, the eponymous hero slays a different dragon. The depiction of dragons hoarding a treasure (symbolizing the wealth of the community) in Germanic legends may also be a reflex of the original myth of the serpent holding waters.

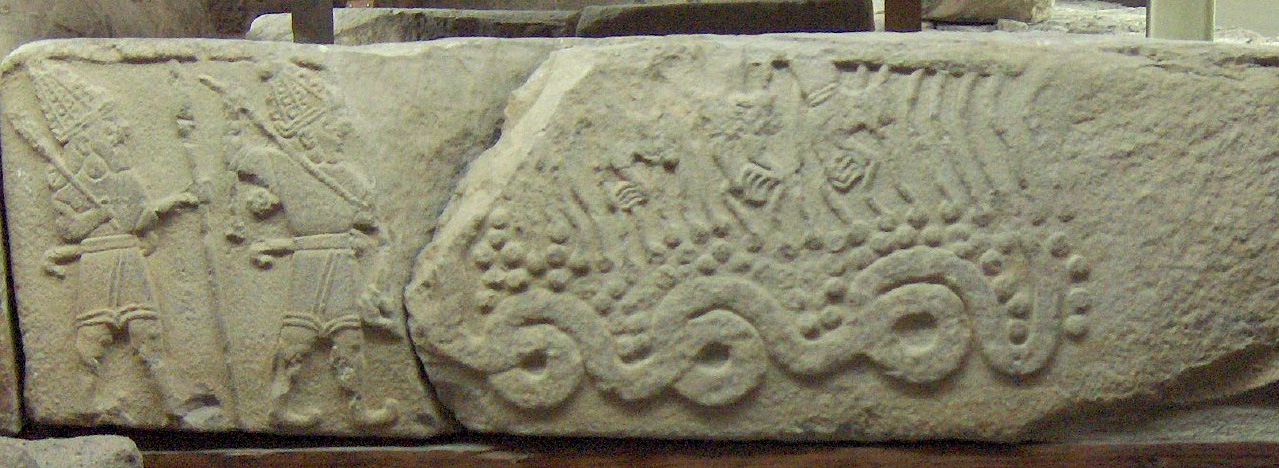
The Hittite god Tarhunt, followed by his son Sarruma, kills the dragon Illuyanka (Museum of Anatolian Civilizations, Ankara, Turkey).

In Zoroastrianism and in Persian mythology, Fereydun (and later Garshasp) slays the serpent Zahhak. In Albanian mythology, the drangue, semi-human divine figures associated with thunders, slay the kulshedra, huge multi-headed fire-spitting serpents associated with water and storms. The Slavic god of storms Perun slays his enemy the dragon-god Veles, as does the bogatyr hero Dobrynya Nikitich to the three-headed dragon Zmey. A similar execution is performed by the Armenian god of thunders Vahagn to the dragon Vishap, by the Romanian knight hero Făt-Frumos to the fire-spitting monster Zmeu, and by the Celtic god of healing Dian Cecht to the serpent Meichi.

In Shinto, where Indo-European influences through Vedic religion can be seen in mythology, the storm god Susanoo slays the eight-headed serpent Yamata no Orochi.

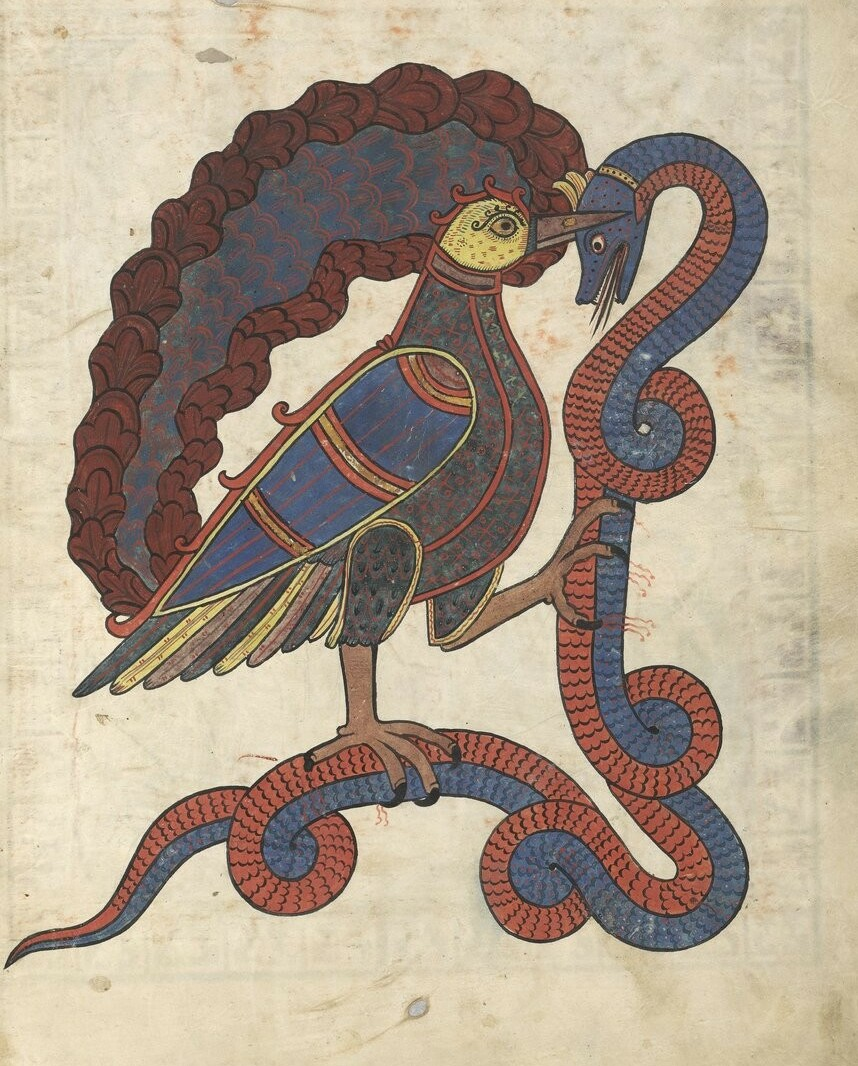
Bird (Christ) victorious over the Serpent (Satan), Saint-Sever Beatus, 11th C.

The Genesis narrative of Judaism and Christianity, as well as the dragon appearing in Revelation 12 can be interpreted as a retelling of the serpent-slaying myth. The Deep or Abyss from or on top of which God is said to make the world is translated from the Biblical Hebrew Tehom (Hebrew: תְּהוֹם). Tehom is a cognate of the Akkadian word tamtu and Ugaritic t-h-m which have similar meaning. As such it was equated with the earlier Babylonian serpent Tiamat.

Folklorist Andrew Lang suggests that the serpent-slaying myth morphed into a folktale motif of a frog or toad blocking the flow of waters.

=== *Tritós and *H₂n̥gʷʰis ===
*H₂n̥gʷʰis or *h₁ógʷʰis is a reconstructed noun meaning 'serpent'. Descendent cognates can be found in the Iranian Aži, the name of the inimical serpent, and in the Indic áhi ('serpent'), a term used to designate the monstrous serpent Vṛtrá, both descending from Proto-Indo-Iranian *Háǰʰiš.

Indo-European linguistic descendants (in bold) and thematic echoes (in italics) of the myth of the First Warrior.
Tradition	First Warrior	Three-headed Serpent	Helper God	Stolen present
Proto-Indo-European	***Tritós** ('Third')	***H₂n̥gʷʰis**	The Storm-god or *H₂nḗr ('Man')	Cattle
Indian	**Trita**	Vṛtrá ('**áhi**')	Indra	Cows
Iranian	Thraētona ('son of **Thrita**')	**Aži** Dahāka	*Vr̥traghna	Women
Germanic	**þriði**, Hymir	Three serpents	Þórr	Goats (?)
Graeco-Roman	Herakles	Geryon, Cācus	Helios	Cattle

== See also ==
- Triple deity
- Trifunctional hypothesis
- Numbers in Germanic paganism
- Numerology
- Indo-European cosmogony
- Manu and Yemo
- Hercules
- Vahagn

== Bibliography ==
- Anthony, David W. (2007). The Horse, the Wheel, and Language: How Bronze-Age Riders from the Eurasian Steppes Shaped the Modern World. Princeton University Press. ISBN 978-1400831104.
- Anthony, David W.; Brown, Dorcas R. (2019). "Late Bronze Age midwinter dog sacrifices and warrior initiations at Krasnosamarskoe, Russia". In Olsen, Birgit A.; Olander, Thomas; Kristiansen, Kristian (eds.). Tracing the Indo-Europeans: New evidence from archaeology and historical linguistics. Oxbow Books. ISBN 978-1-78925-273-6.
- Arvidsson, Stefan (2006). Aryan Idols: Indo-European Mythology as Ideology and Science. University of Chicago Press. ISBN 0-226-02860-7.
- Beekes, Robert S. P. (2009). Etymological Dictionary of Greek. Brill. ISBN 978-90-04-32186-1.
- Beekes, Robert S. P. (2011). Comparative Indo-European Linguistics: An Introduction. John Benjamins Publishing. ISBN 9789027211859.
- Benveniste, Emile (1973). Indo-European Language and Society. Translated by Palmer, Elizabeth. Coral Gables, Florida: University of Miami Press. ISBN 978-0-87024-250-2.
- Burkert, Walter (1985). Greek Religion. Cambridge, Massachusetts: Harvard University Press. ISBN 0-674-36281-0.
- Delamarre, Xavier (2003). Dictionnaire de la langue gauloise: Une approche linguistique du vieux-celtique continental (in French). Errance. ISBN 9782877723695.
- Derksen, Rick (2008). Etymological Dictionary of the Slavic Inherited Lexicon. Brill. ISBN 9789004155046.
- Dumézil, Georges (1966). Archaic Roman Religion: With an Appendix on the Religion of the Etruscans (1996 ed.). Johns Hopkins University Press. ISBN 978-0-8018-5482-8.
- Dumézil, Georges (1986). Mythe et épopée: L'idéologie des trois fonctions dans les épopées des peuples indo-européens (in French). Gallimard. ISBN 978-2-07-026961-7.
- Fortson, Benjamin W. (2004). Indo-European Language and Culture. Blackwell Publishing. ISBN 1-4051-0316-7.
- Gamkrelidze, Thomas V.; Ivanov, Vjaceslav V. (1995). Winter, Werner (ed.). Indo-European and the Indo-Europeans: A Reconstruction and Historical Analysis of a Proto-Language and a Proto-Culture. Trends in Linguistics: Studies and Monographs 80. Berlin: M. De Gruyter.
- Haudry, Jean (1987). La religion cosmique des Indo-Européens (in French). Archè. ISBN 978-2-251-35352-4.
- Jackson, Peter (2002). "Light from Distant Asterisks. Towards a Description of the Indo-European Religious Heritage". Numen. 49 (1): 61–102. doi:10.1163/15685270252772777. JSTOR 3270472.
- Jakobson, Roman (1985). "Linguistic Evidence in Comparative Mythology". In Stephen Rudy (ed.). Roman Jakobson: Selected Writings. Vol. VII: Contributions to Comparative Mythology: Studies in Linguistics and Philology, 1972–1982. Walter de Gruyter. ISBN 9783110855463.
- Kurkjian, Vahan M. (1958). "History of Armenia: Chapter XXXIV". Penelope. University of Chicago.
- Leeming, David A. (2009). Creation Myths of the World: An Encyclopedia. Vol. 1. ABC-CLIO. ISBN 9781598841749.
- Littleton, C. Scott (1982). "From swords in the earth to the sword in the stone: A possible reflection of an Alano-Sarmatian rite of passage in the Arthurian tradition". In Polomé, Edgar C. (ed.). Homage to Georges Dumézil. Journal of Indo-European Studies, Institute for the Study of Man. pp. 53–68. ISBN 9780941694285.
- Lincoln, Bruce (November 1975). "The Indo-European Myth of Creation". History of Religions. 15 (2): 121–145. doi:10.1086/462739. S2CID 162101898.
- Lincoln, Bruce (August 1976). "The Indo-European Cattle-Raiding Myth". History of Religions. 16 (1): 42–65. doi:10.1086/462755. JSTOR 1062296. S2CID 162286120.
- Lincoln, Bruce (1991). Death, War, and Sacrifice: Studies in Ideology and Practice. Chicago, Illinois: University of Chicago Press. ISBN 978-0226482002.
- Mallory, James P. (1991). In Search of the Indo-Europeans. London: Thames & Hudson. ISBN 978-0-500-27616-7.
- Mallory, James P.; Adams, Douglas Q. (1997). Encyclopedia of Indo-European Culture. London: Routledge. ISBN 978-1-884964-98-5.
- Mallory, James P.; Adams, Douglas Q. (2006). The Oxford Introduction to Proto-Indo-European and the Proto-Indo-European World. Oxford, England: Oxford University Press. ISBN 978-0-19-929668-2.
- Matasović, Ranko (2009). Etymological Dictionary of Proto-Celtic. Brill. ISBN 9789004173361.
- Parpola, Asko (2015). The Roots of Hinduism: The Early Aryans and the Indus Civilization. Oxford University Press. ISBN 9780190226923.
- Polomé, Edgar C. (1986). "The Background of Germanic Cosmogonic Myths". In Brogyanyi, Bela; Krömmelbein, Thomas (eds.). Germanic Dialects: Linguistic and Philological Investigations. John Benjamins Publishing. ISBN 978-90-272-7946-0.
- Puhvel, Jaan (1987). Comparative Mythology. Baltimore, Maryland: Johns Hopkins University Press. ISBN 978-0-8018-3938-2.
- Renfrew, Colin (1987). Archaeology & Language. The Puzzle of the Indo-European Origins. London: Jonathan Cape. ISBN 978-0-521-35432-5.
- Telegrin, D. Ya.; Mallory, James P. (1994). The Anthropomorphic Stelae of the Ukraine: The Early Iconography of the Indo-Europeans. Journal of Indo-European Studies Monograph Series. Vol. 11. Washington D.C., United States: Institute for the Study of Man. ISBN 978-0941694452.
- Tirta, Mark (2004). Petrit Bezhani (ed.). Mitologjia ndër shqiptarë (in Albanian). Tirana: Mësonjëtorja. ISBN 99927-938-9-9.
- Treimer, Karl (1971). "Zur Rückerschliessung der illyrischen Götterwelt und ihre Bedeutung für die südslawische Philologie". In Henrik Barić (ed.). Arhiv za Arbanasku starinu, jezik i etnologiju. Vol. I. R. Trofenik. pp. 27–33.
- Watkins, Calvert (1995). How to Kill a Dragon: Aspects of Indo-European Poetics. London: Oxford University Press. ISBN 978-0-19-514413-0.
- West, Martin L. (2007). Indo-European Poetry and Myth. Oxford, England: Oxford University Press. ISBN 978-0-19-928075-9.
- Winter, Werner (2003). Language in Time and Space. Berlin, Germany: Walter de Gruyter. ISBN 978-3-11-017648-3.
- Witzel, Michael (2012). The Origins of the World's Mythologies. Oxford University Press. ISBN 978-0-19-981285-1.
- York, Michael (1988). "Romulus and Remus, Mars and Quirinus". Journal of Indo-European Studies. 16 (1–2): 153–172. ISSN 0092-2323.
