= Verethragna =

Zoroastrian god of victory

Bahram Avestan: 𐬬𐬆𐬭𐬆𐬚𐬭𐬀𐬖𐬥𐬀
- God of victory and war, destroyer of obstacles
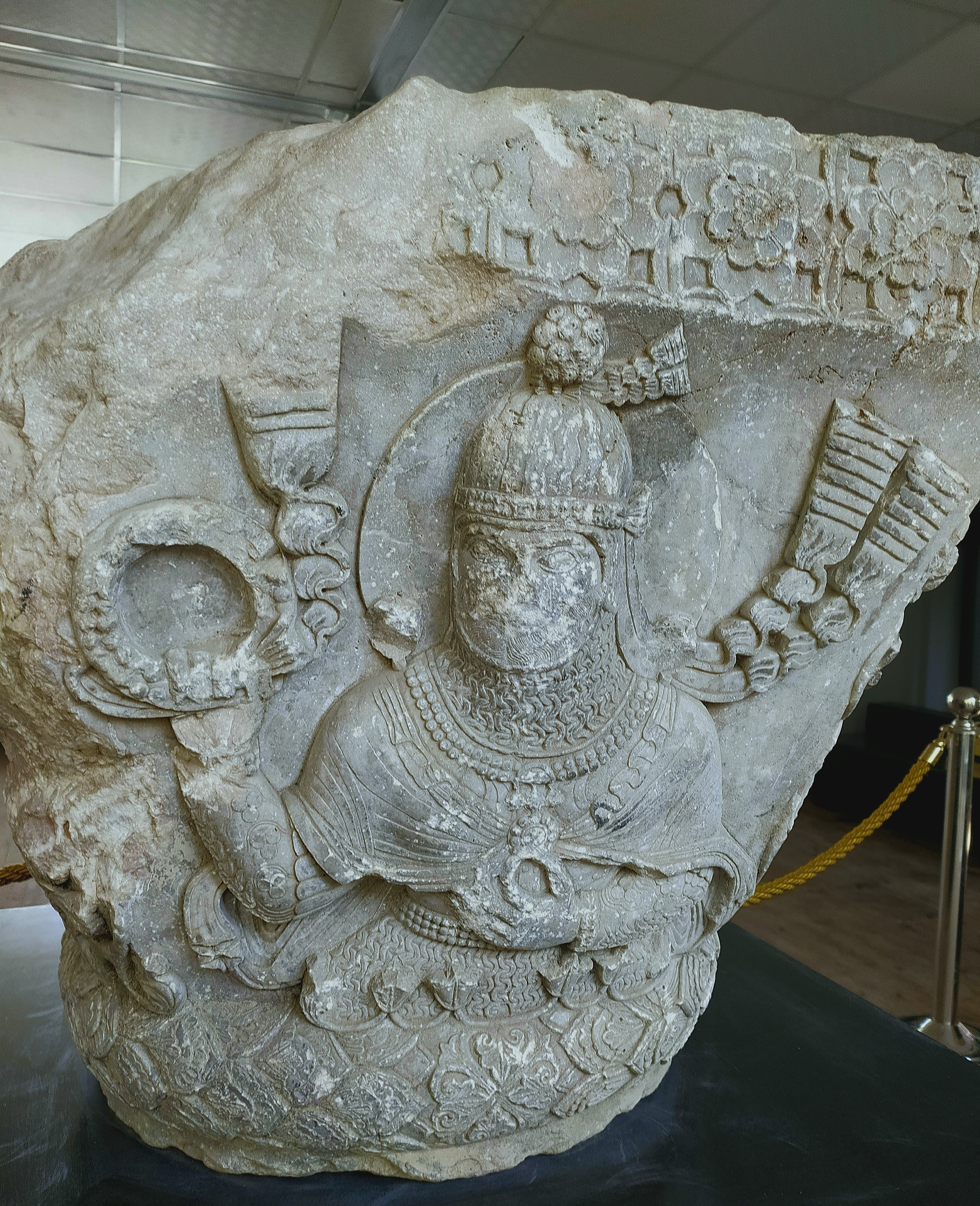
- Relief of the God Bahram on a column in Taq-e Bostan, Sassanian period
- Other names: Vahram, Varahram, Bahram, Verethragna, Wahram, Warahran, Vahram
- Affiliation: The Thirty-Three Deities, Guardians of the Days of the Month
- Planet: Mars
- Symbol: White Horse, Strong wind, Wild Boar, Camel, Bull, Young Man, Ram, Wild Goat, Magnificent Armed Man, Bird of Prey
- Sacred flower: Hyacinth
- Attributes: Victory, martial strength, protection, healing, virility, and divine glory
- Day: 20th day of every month in the Zoroastrian calendar
- Texts: Bahram Yasht, Mihr Yasht, Bundahishn
- Gender: Male
- Associated deities: Tishtrya, Mithra, Vayu-Vata, Chista

Equivalents
- Greek: Heracles
- Hindu: Indra
- Armenian: Vahagn

Bahram (Avestan: 𐬬𐬆𐬭𐬆𐬚𐬭𐬀𐬖𐬥𐬀; Vərəθraγna), also known as Warahrān (Middle Persian: 𐭥𐭫𐭧𐭫𐭠𐭭), is an Iranian yazata in Zoroastrianism who personifies victory, above all the irresistible attacking force that overcomes opposition. He is an ancient warrior god who shatters his enemies, human and demonic, and gives success to those who worship him. His violent punishments fall on wickedness and broken agreements, while his power also guards against hostile armies and plague. Beyond battle he bestows bodily health, healing and virility, and in modern worship he protects travellers. The Bahram Yasht presents him in ten forms, from a rushing wind and a raging boar to a bird of prey and a man wielding a golden sword.

His Avestan name is related to the breaking of an obstacle and to the Vedic epithet vṛtrahan, applied especially to Indra. The gods have been traced to a possible shared Indo-Iranian warrior figure, though another theory distinguishes an original victory god from the dragon-slaying hero. Bahram himself has no surviving Iranian dragon-slaying myth, unlike the Vedic Indra or the Armenian Vahagn. Zoroastrian tradition recast victory as the conquest of evil in an intellectual and moral sense, and later Middle Persian writings elevated Wahrām to the ranks of the Amahraspandān for driving Ahriman back into hell.

Bahram's cult was widespread among Iranian peoples and particularly popular with warriors. Its Avestan hymn preserves descriptions of sacred feathers, battlefield invocations, magic and exorcistic rites. His name became attached to the planet Mars and to the highest class of Zoroastrian sacred fire, Atash Bahram, although the fire's name has been traced to an older adjective meaning "victorious." In art his boar and bird forms marked Sasanian royal power, while the deity also appeared as Heracles in the Hellenistic west and as Orlagno on Kushan coins. In Armenia he survived as Vahagn, and in Sogdian Manichaeism his name was given to the heroic Adamas.

== Etymology ==
The Avestan neuter noun vərəθraγna is related to vərəθra, an "obstacle," and to the adjective vərəθraγan, "victorious." The Proto-Aryan adjective *vrtraghan, corresponding to the Avestan divine name, has an etymological cognate in Vedic Sanskrit, Vṛtra. In the Vedas, Vṛtrahan occurs predominantly as an epithet of Indra.

The name of the old Iranian victory god appears as Avestan Vərəθraγna and Middle Persian Warahrān or Wahrān, later Bahrām. The form Warahrān was frequently used as a male personal name.

== Character and functions ==
Vayu-Vata and Tishtar are associated with natural phenomena, while Anahita is conceived in more personal and affectionate terms. Bahram, by contrast, personifies an abstract idea, the aggressive and irresistible force of victory. As the divine embodiment and giver of victory, Vərəθraγna was said to have enjoyed "the greatest popularity of old." In the Avesta he has the character of an ancient warrior god whose offensive strength shatters every resistance and defense. He is therefore joined with Vanaintī Uparatāt, "Conquering Superiority," and honoured as yazatanąm zayō.tə̄mō, "the most highly armed of the gods." He is also amavastəmō, the most endowed with attacking might, and xᵛarənaŋuhastəmō, the most endowed with divine glory (xᵛarənah). He continually battles human and demonic foes, including the daēvas, wizards called yātus, the pairikās, kavis and karapans. His other Avestan epithets include amavant, "strong" or "endowed with attacking might," ahuraδāta, "created by Ahura," and barō.xᵛarəna, "bearing divine glory." The names hvāxšta, "possessing good peace," and hvāyaona, "possessing a good place," associate him with Chista. The further names aršō.kara, "conferring virility," maršō.kara, "rendering decrepit," and frašō.kara, "making wonderful," relate him to Zurwan.

Unlike Vedic Indra and Armenian Vahagn, the Iranian Bahram has no surviving myth in which he kills a monster or dragon. He instead defeats the malice of humans and demons and punishes the untruthful and wicked. In the hymn to Mithra the attacking boar throws his opponents down with his head and cuts them to pieces. The bones, hair, brains and blood of men false to their agreements are mixed together on the ground. Yasht 14.62 praises Bahram, made by Ahura, as the god who breaks apart the columns of an army, cuts them into pieces, wounds them and makes them shake. Each action is repeated as he comes against the columns of daēvas and humans, sorcerers and pairikās, oppressors, the blind and the deaf. The invocation offers him a sacrifice worthy of being heard, for his brightness and glory. The following verse likewise offers sacrifice to Bahram, made by Ahura. He binds the hands of the Mithradrujes, confounds their sight and takes away their hearing. Though they march in columns and join together by cities, they can neither move their feet nor withstand him. The verse closes with an offering worthy of being heard, again made for his brightness and glory.

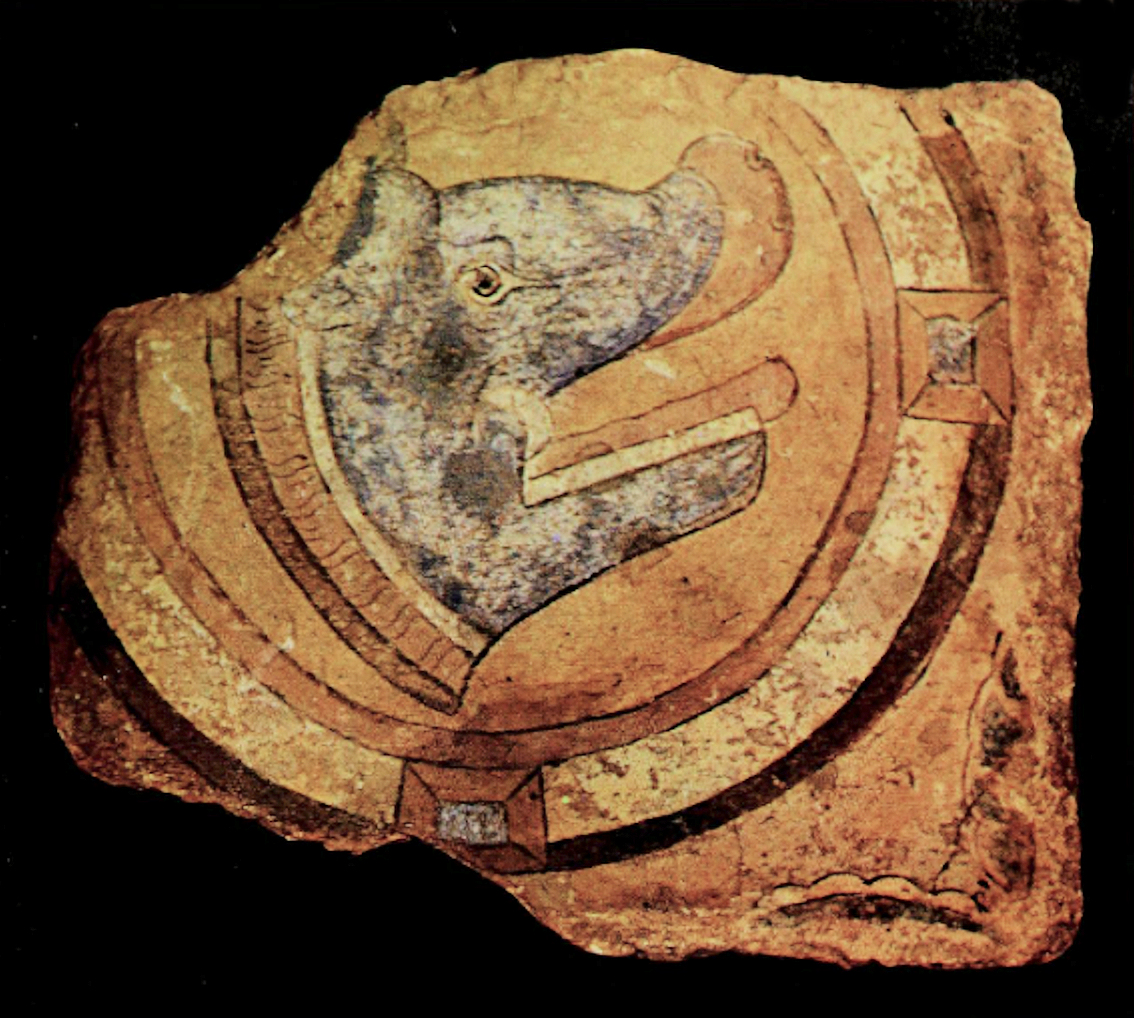
A boar in a frescoe at Bamiyan, symbol of the Mazdean god of victory Verethragna. 6th-7th century CE.

The Bahram Yasht gives the god ten successive incarnations, each expressing his force in movement and attack. He first arrives as a strong wind, then a bull with yellow ears and golden horns, and then a white horse with golden trappings. His fourth form is a sharp-toothed, burden-bearing camel stamping forward. The fifth is a furious male boar, so strong and sharp-tusked that it kills with one blow. Sixth comes a youth of fifteen, at the ideal age of vigour. His seventh form is a swift bird, perhaps a raven, followed by a wild ram and a fighting buck. The tenth is a man bearing a sword with a blade of gold. The great bird and the boar were especially popular manifestations. Ancient Iranians held a raven's feathers in superstitious awe, believing that a feather could make its bearer inviolable and bring him prosperity and glory. The ten animal and human forms have been compared to the ten incarnations of Indra and to Vishnu's avataras in Puranic literature, although the details do not correspond exactly. Bahram and Tishtar both appear as a man, a bull and a horse. Zoroastrian teaching holds that beings of the spiritual world (mēnōg) can assume material form (gētīg). The material world itself came into being through the spiritual world's taking bodily form. Earthly beings take bodies appropriate to their nature, but heavenly beings may appear in several different bodies, as Tishtar does in three forms and Bahram in ten. In the Avesta Tishtar takes the forms of a fifteen-year-old youth, a bull with horns of gold and a white horse. The vārəγna bird is also a form of divine glory (xᵛarənah), and the camel belongs to Vayu-Vata, along with his first incarnation as an impetuous wind, emphasizing their shared warlike power.

Bahram is "the strongest in strength," "the most victorious in victory" and "the most glorious in glory." Correct sacrifices bring his victory in life and on the battlefield. When he is properly worshipped, neither hostile armies nor plague can enter the Aryan lands. Bahram's powers do not end with physical victory or war. His other epithets give him functions connected with virility, sexual potency, health and the soundness of the body. He gives men the "spring of the testicles," ərəzōiš xå, and bears the title baēšazyō.təmō, "the most gifted with healing." In modern Zoroastrian practice he is particularly worshipped as a protector of travellers. Alongside Chista, Bahram is one of the principal companions of Mithra. The boar Dāmōiš Upamana in Mithra's hymn has been identified as an alter ego of Bahram, who himself takes a boar's form in Yasht 14. The name Dāmōiš Upamana itself has been interpreted as "Likeness of Ahura's creature," probably corresponding to *ahuraδātahe upamana. After recounting his incarnations, the Bahram Yasht lists the favors he grants to Zoroaster and to those who worship him according to the prescribed cult. They receive victory in thought, word and action, as well as victory in declamatory speaking and in verbal retorts. The latter gifts belong to a conception of victory extending back to Indo-Iranian contests of speech.In Pahlavi religious writings, Bahram appears in the company of Mithra, Rashn, Vayu-Vata, Arshtat and the glory of the Mazdayan religion. During the three days following death, until the fourth dawn, he joins Soroush and Vayu-Vata in accompanying and guiding the departed soul on its journey into the other world. His companionship with Mihr, Rash and Soroush continues doctrines already present in the Avesta.

== Origin and development ==
Bahram's original identity was once among the most disputed problems of Zoroastrian studies. The competing accounts of his origins also concern the far-reaching transformation of ethical, moral and religious values in the Iranian tradition. The principal linguistic comparison is between Avestan vərəθraγan, "victorious," and Sanskrit vṛtrahan, which is used predominantly of Indra. On this basis, an Aryan warrior god called Indra has been reconstructed for the Proto-Indo-Iranian period, and Bahram may preserve the Iranian form of that shared divinity. The existence of this earlier god has also been presented as accepted by Zoroastrians and Hindus alike. Sanskrit vṛtraghna is cognate with Vərəθraγna and an important epithet of Indra, whose defeat of Vṛtra could mean the overcoming of an obstacle or an adversary, or the slaying of the cosmic demon or dragon who personifies it.

In one reconstruction, Vedic Indra Vṛtrahan and Avestan Vərəθraγna (Bahram) descend from a common Proto-Indo-Aryan warrior deity, Indra Vrtraghan. Indra's well-known epithet vṛtrahan recalls his slaying of the dragon Vṛtra. The proposed common god, Indra Vṛtrahan, was therefore reconstructed as both a warrior and a dragon-slayer. In this account, Zoroastrian reform separated the older divine character into Vərəθraγna (Bahram), who no longer kills a dragon in surviving myth, and the daēva Indra, who was demonized. A further theory finds a surviving trace of Bahram's lost dragon-slaying myth in the Armenian Vahagn. Other interpretations regard Vahagn's dragon-slaying as a secondary feature or the result of local Armenian elements.

The Vedic and Avestan warrior gods have also been presented as descendants of a common Indo-Iranian divine figure, with Bahram as an Iranian continuation of Indra Vṛtrahan. In these comparisons, both serve as leading demon-slaying war gods and receive rich offerings of Haoma. Each supports the victorious heroic figure of Trita in the defeat of a primordial enemy, often imagined as a monster or dragon. The paired heroic stories concern Vedic Trita and Avestan Thraetaona, called the "Son of Trita," and their victories over the three-headed, six-eyed adversaries Trishiras and Azhdahak. Both Bahram and Indra Vṛtrahan are depicted in the collected comparisons as allied with and "carrying" the legendary sage Kavi Usan, called Kavi Usa in the Avesta and Kavi Usana in the Vedas. Both gods are also invoked for health and specifically for virility and masculine sexual power. Their warrior figures are youthful, with golden or yellow features. Each can appear in or change into animal forms for divine intervention, including an eagle or falcon, a goat, boar, ram, bull and horse. Both are connected with the Soma bird, known as śyena in the Vedic tradition and saēna in the Avesta. They are also protectors of livestock, especially cattle. Both warrior figures have Vayu-Vāta, the Indo-Iranian wind god, as a close divine companion. Later, in the Hellenistic period, both were also identified separately with the Greek Heracles. Iranian Bahram entered Greek-Persian images of Heracles, while Indra, as Vajrapāṇi or "bearer of the thunderbolt," entered Indo-Greek representations of the same Greek hero.

A second theory distinguishes two original figures, an Indo-Iranian god *Vṛtraghan and a separate dragon-slaying hero. In this view Iran kept the ancient god, whereas India innovated by raising Indra to divine rank and giving him the traits and functions of *Vṛtraghan. The common-warrior-god theory has been judged the more likely, at least in part, provided that the older figure's principal task was to overcome an obstacle, vərəθra, rather than necessarily to kill a dragon. The obstacle could have prevented the waters from flowing, and breaking it would then have been part of the creation of the cosmos. Zoroastrian reform deeply changed the meaning of Bahram's victory. Later writings, from ninth-century Pahlavi texts to Parsi religious tradition, show Warahrān or Bahram as the god who defeats evil in thought and moral conduct, not only through physical might. This development belongs to a radical change in inherited religious and ethical values, through which the old Iranian victory god took on an intellectual and moral role. In later Middle Persian writings he is even honoured as one of the Amahraspandan, because he drove back Ahriman. His special elevation made Bahram the seventh among the Amahraspandan. He is called pērōzgar, "victorious," for his success in forcing Ahriman back into hell.

== Cult and worship ==
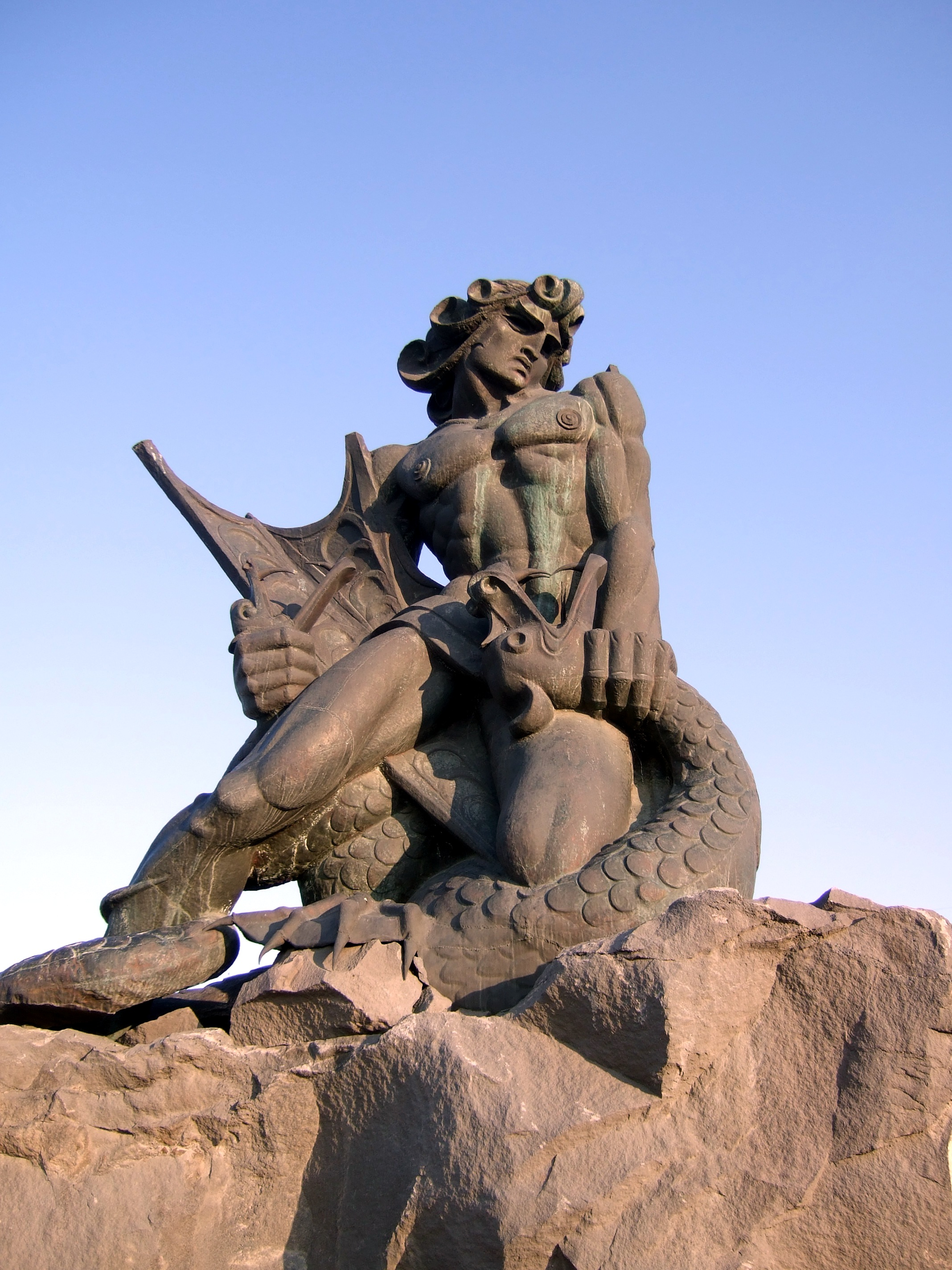
Statue of Vahagn, the Armenian equivalent to Bahram

Bahram was one of the chief gods of the ancient Iranian pantheon. His cult extended through Iranian and Iranian-influenced lands, perhaps from as early as the beginning of the Achaemenid period. The old pre-Zoroastrian worship continued, and Bahram also received a high place in Zoroastrian religion. As god of war and victory, he guarded armed Iranians, and his cult suited the warlike outlook and ambitions of expansion among the Iranian military aristocracy. Soldiers were particularly devoted to Bahram and may have carried his worship to distant regions. The god is found as Bahram-Heracles in Commagene, Vahagn in Armenia, Varlagn among the Scythians, Vasaga in Sogdia and Artagn in Chorasmia. Among the Karmanians, the Greeks identified an "Ares" reportedly enjoyed exceptional honour and was worshipped as their only god. The report, perhaps derived from Nearchus, has probably preserved evidence for the cult of the Iranian god of war and victory. This type of war god was also worshipped by Iranian peoples beyond the plateau. Herodotus records the special cult that the Scythians reserved for Ares (Barham), a practice also compared with Iranian warrior religion.

Yasht 14, the hymn dedicated to Bahram, is poorly preserved but retains apparently very ancient elements. The Bahrām Yašt has been placed among the oldest parts of the Younger Avesta, or at least regarded as a hymn containing much archaic material. Even in its surviving form, the hymn gives a vivid and extensive portrayal of the deity. Its composition is somewhat patchwork-like, with many passages echoing other Avestan texts. The Zoroastrian remaking of Bahram's cult appears in Yasht 14.28–33, alongside an older popular image tied to magic and exorcism. Similar practices occur in India. One prominent rite was the "magic of the feather," including oracles drawn from the way a falcon's feather falls or flies. In Yasht 14.42–45 Zoroaster asks where the name of Bahram, made by Ahura, should be invoked, praised and humbly honoured. Ahura Mazda answers that he should be called upon when two armies stand against each other in full battle order, each seeking to conquer without being crushed and to strike without receiving a blow. He then commands four feathers to be thrown in the path. The army that first worships well-formed Strength and Bahram, beautiful in form and made by Mazda, will be victorious. The divine reply blesses Strength and Victory as two good keepers and maintainers, followed by three obscure expressions, and names them as the two who forgive, strike off and forget. The translator marks the feather instruction as doubtful and offers the alternative reading of an arrow feathered with four feathers of the Varenjana bird.

During Sasanian calendrical and astronomical reforms (224–651 CE), the planet Mars was identified with Bahram. This has been linked to Chaldean astral religion, in which Nergal was both a Babylonian war god and the name of the red planet. The equation of Bahram with Greek Ares was also repeated in astrology introduced through Greco-Babylonian influence. The Pahlavi name for Mars was Wahrām. The most sacred class of Zoroastrian fires is now called Atash Bahram, a name later understood as "Fire of Bahram" rather than the older adjectival "Victorious Fire." The older adjective occurs in Middle Persian inscriptions, including Kartir's inscription at Kaʿba-ye Zartosht, whereas the present expression is understood as a divine possessive. The change has been explained as a natural misunderstanding, assisted in Islamic times by a gradual loss of priestly teaching about Zoroastrian beliefs and rites. The adjective vərəθraγan was applied not only to men and gods but probably also to fire. Its use in vərəθraγan ātar, "Victorious Fire," is considered the likely ancestor of ādur ī warahrān in Kartir's third-century inscriptions and of the later Atash Bahram. Only after the Sasanian period was this phrase reinterpreted as the "Fire of Vərəθraγna," the name of the god replacing the earlier adjective in the understanding of worshippers. In this interpretation the so-called Fire of Bahram is a later creation without an original direct dedication to the ancient god, a confusion reinforced as knowledge of older doctrine and religious practice gradually declined during Islamic times. In the Sasanian period wahrām also served as a general name for principal fires. A throne-altar on the reverse of certain coins, and a head within the flames on others, have been tentatively identified as representations of the Bahram fire. The Dādistān ī dēnīg 31.7 states that Bahram can be seen in the fire.

== Iconography ==
Sasanian seals and coins portray Bahram as the victorious fire, Atash Bahram. His animal incarnations, as listed in Yasht 14, also appear throughout Sasanian art. On one relief a figure has tentatively been identified as Bahram receiving homage from the future Sasanian king Bahram I, who appears smaller and faces the god. Five Sasanian kings bore the divine name.

Wings on Sasanian royal crowns derive from Bahram's bird of prey and marked a king's special relation to his divine patron. This emblem first occurs on Bahram II's crown. It was subsequently taken up by Peroz, whose name means victorious, and by Khosrow-Parviz, whose name likewise contains the idea of victory. The caps of Sasanian princes likewise bear boar or eagle heads as emblems of Bahram. Images of boars are widespread in stucco decoration, silver vessels, textiles and seals. These boars have been interpreted as the deity in his most ferocious form. A crown of Khosrow carries wings resembling both the emblem of Bahram and a symbol of the moon god Mah.

At Arsameia in Commagene, a relief shows King Mithradates Kallinikos clasping hands with a god identified in its inscription as Herakles–Bahram. The king's name itself combines Greek and Persian elements. The eastern Iranian representation of the god does not follow a Greek model. On the Iranian plateau, however, the art of Heracles influenced his portrayal. One three-dimensional carving at the foot of the Behistun cliff shows a reclining Heracles-like figure with a wine cup and lion-skin cloak. Kushan coins, including those struck for Kanishka, depict the victory god under the name ΟΡΛΑΓΝΟ, "Orlagno." He holds a spear in his left hand and rests his right hand on the hilt of a sword. He sometimes wears a headdress and a nimbus, which has been taken as an indication of a solar association comparable to the imagery of the Avestan Mihr Yasht.

Iconographic representations of Bahram

Winged Sassanian crown - fire altar

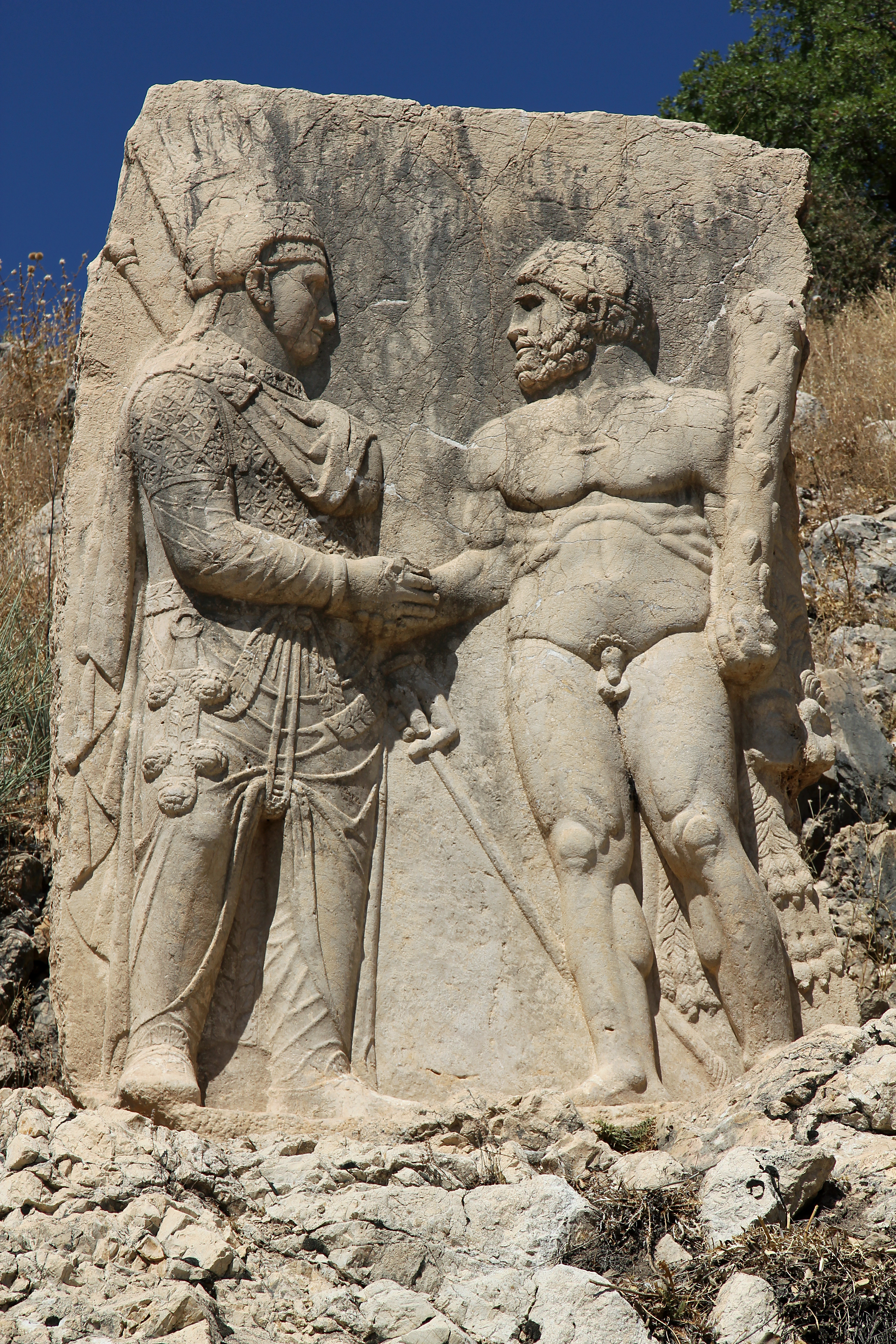
Bahram-Heracles (right)

Bahram-Orlango (Kushan)

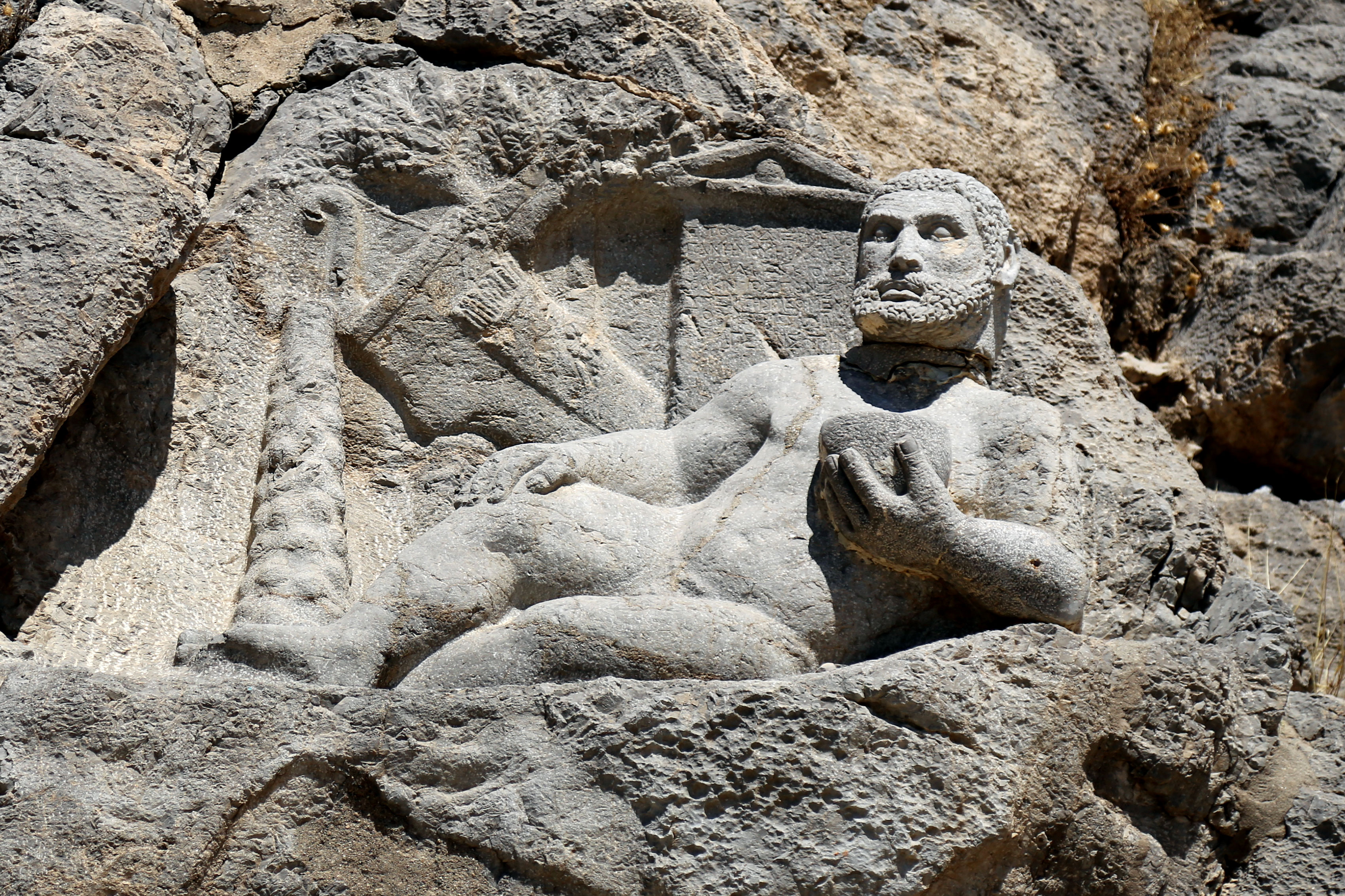
Bahram-Heracles

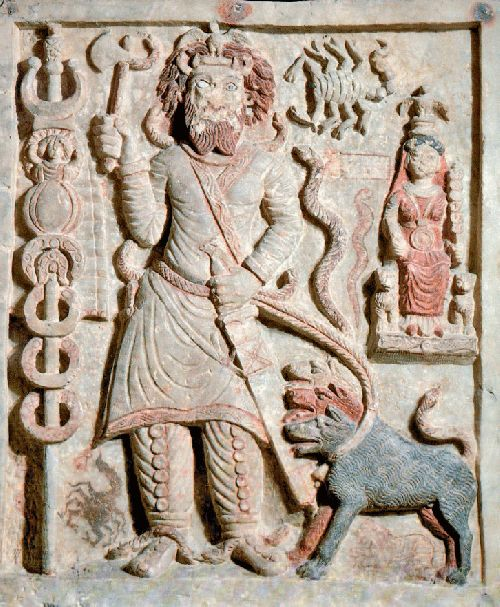
Bahram-Heracles with Cerberus

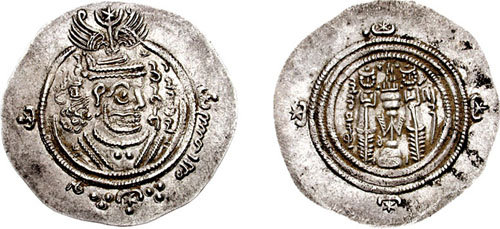
Sassanian crown with wings and moon

== Other religious traditions ==
In the Hellenistic-influenced Seleucid (330–150 BCE) and Arsacid (250 BCE–226 CE) periods, Bahram was identified with Greek Ares and associated with Heracles. He also received the Greek name Artagnes. Greek artistic portrayals also gave Bahram features of Heracles, and the resulting combination of Iranian and Hellenistic worship is widely attested. Greco-Babylonian and Iranian religious exchange also brought astrological doctrines into a Zoroastrian setting where they had not originally belonged. The correspondences among Vərəθraγna, Nergal and Ares formed part of this development. These identifications also entered the Mysteries of Mithra, where the link between Bahram and Heracles appeared in religious art.

The cult of Bahram also spread east and west into lands strongly influenced by Iranian religion. Armenia was a particularly important western example. Under strong Parthian influence, Vahagn, identified with Heracles, became one of the country's three principal divinities of Iranian origin, together with Aramazd (Ohrmazd) and Anahit (Anahita), who bore the title "strangler of dragons," višapakʿał or drakontopniktḗs. Both Anahit and Astłik were associated with him. Astłik was his concubine and was identified with Greek Aphrodite. Proposals that Vahagn originated entirely outside Iranian religion have been criticized as largely exaggerated and mistaken.

In the eastern Iranian lands, the victory god appeared as ORLAGNO in the pantheon of divinities pictured on Kushan coins. His winged headdress is an Iranian motif that links him with xᵛarənah, the divine glory known among the Kushans as Farro. Apart from coins, evidence for Orlagno in Bactria is limited to personal names derived from that of the god. Of three examples, two are Iranian but not fully Bactrian, and the reading of the third is uncertain. Unlike in western Iran, Bactria did not equate Heracles with Orlagno. Heracles appears separately on coins under the name ΗΡΑΚΙΛΟ, and the two gods have entirely independent iconographies. No surviving written source identifies them as one figure. Orlagno may eventually have lost ground among the Bactrians to other warlike divinities, notably Vayu or Wešo, especially after Wešo's image changed so that the wind was no longer its defining feature. Such a shift is placed in Kushan times because Orlagno disappeared from coinage under Huvishka.The Sogdian pantheon likewise contained a god named Wšγn, corresponding to the ancient Iranian victory divinity. In Sogdian Manichaeism the same name was given to Adamas, a heroic figure in that religion. In a much later setting, Mirza Husain Noori Tabarsi collected 182 names for the Shiʿi Mahdi in his book Al-Najm al-Thaqib. Among the ancient Persian and Zoroastrian titles in this list is Bahram.

== See also ==
- Indra
- Vritra
- List of war deities

== Bibliography ==
- Benveniste, Émile & Renou, Louis (1934). Vrtra et Vrθragna. Paris, FR: Imprimerie Nationale.
- Boyce, Mary (1975). History of Zoroastrianism. Vol. I, The early period. Leiden, NL: Brill. ISBN 90-04-10474-7.
- Boyce, Mary (1982). History of Zoroastrianism. Vol. II, Under the Achamenians. Leiden, NL: Brill. ISBN 90-04-06506-7.
- Duchesne-Guillemin, J. (1973). La religion de l'Iran ancien [Religion of ancient Iran] (in French). Bombay, IN: Tata Press.
- Gershevitch, Ilya, ed. (1959). The Avestan Hymn to Mithra. Cambridge: Cambridge University Press. OCLC 459329059.
- Gnoli, Gherardo (1989). "Bahram in old and middle Iranian texts". Encyclopaedia Iranica. Vol. 3. New York, NY: Routledge & Kegan Paul. pp. 510–513.
- Gnoli, Gherardo; Jamzadeh, P. (1988). "Bahrām (Vərəθraγna)". Encyclopaedia Iranica. Vol. III, Fasc. 5, pages 510–514.
- de Menasce, Jean-Pierre (1958). Une encyclopédie mazdéenne: le Dēnkart. Quatre conférences données à l'Université de Paris sous les auspices de la fondation Ratanbai Katrak. Paris: Presses Universitaires de France.
- Thieme, Paul (October–December 1960). "The 'Aryan' gods of the Mitanni treaties". Journal of the American Oriental Society. 80 (4): 301–317. doi:10.2307/595878. JSTOR 595878.
- Zaehner, Richard Charles (1955). Zurvan, a Zoroastrian dilemma. Oxford, UK: Clarendon. ISBN 0-8196-0280-9.
