= Trita =

Hindu minor deity

Trita (Sanskrit: त्रित tritá, "the Third") is a minor deity of the Rigveda, mentioned 41 times. He is associated with the Maruts, with Vayu and most especially with Indra, whom he sometimes assists and other times acts in place of when fighting Tvastar, Vrtra and Vala. He is called Āptya, probably meaning "of the water (Apas)."

== Relation to Apas ==
The Shatapatha Brahmana mentions Trita and his brothers Ekata and Dvita as the sons of Apas or the water deities who were born as a result of Agni's anger with the waters.

Fourfold, namely, was Agni (fire) at first. Now that Agni whom they at first chose for the office of Hotri priest passed away. He also whom they chose the second time passed away. He also whom they chose the third time passed away. Thereupon the one who still constitutes the fire in our own time, concealed himself from fear. He entered into the waters. Him the gods discovered and brought forcibly away from the waters. He spat upon the waters, saying, 'Bespitten are ye who are an unsafe place of refuge, from whom they take me away against my will!' Thence sprung the Âptya deities, Trita, Dvita, and Ekata. - 1:2:3:1

== Relation to Indra and Killing of Trishiras ==
The Shatapatha Brahmana also mentions that they followed Indra just as a Brahman follows the train of a king.

They roamed about with Indra, even as nowadays a Brâhman follows in the train of a king. When he slew Visvarûpa, the three-headed son of Tvashtri, they also knew of his going to be killed.; and straightway Trita slew him. Indra, assuredly, was free from that (sin), for he is a god. - 1:2:3:2

== Other stories ==
In RV 1.105, Trita fell into a well and begged for aid from the gods. Sayana on 1.105 comments that this relates to three rishis, Ekata, Dvita and Trita, who found a well; and Trita, drawing water, was pushed down by the other two and imprisoned, where he composed a hymn to the gods, and managed miraculously to prepare the sacrificial Soma. This is alluded to in RV 9.34.4 and described in Mahabharata 9.2095.

RV 8.47 asks Dawn to send away bad dreams to Trita, who eats them and wears them on his body as ornaments; Dvita also receives these bad dreams.

== See also ==
- Trito (Proto-Indo-European mythology)
- Fereydun
