= David Adams Leeming =

American philologist (born 1937)

- Born: February 26, 1937 (age 89); Peekskill, New York, U.S.
- Education: Princeton University (B.A., 1958); University of Caen; New York University (M.A., 1964; PhD, 1970)
- Occupation: Philologist
- Organizations: University of Connecticut
- Spouse: Pamela Elaine Fraser (m. 1967)
- Children: 3

David Adams Leeming (born February 26, 1937) is an American philologist who is Professor Emeritus of English and Comparative Literature at the University of Connecticut, and a specialist in comparative literature of mythology and an important biographer (and friend) of James Baldwin.

== Biography ==
David Adams Leeming was born on February 26, 1937, in Peekskill, New York, the son of Frank Clifford Leeming, an Episcopal priest, and Margaret Adams Reeder.

Leeming received his B.A. degree from Princeton University in 1958. In 1959, he did a summer course graduate study at the University of Caen. From New York University he received his M.A. in 1964, and his Ph.D. in 1970.

Leeming was head of the English department of the Lycée at Robert College in Istanbul, Turkey, from 1958 to 1963, and again from 1966 to 1969. From 1964 to 1967, he was the secretary-assistant of author James Baldwin in New York and Istanbul. Since 1969, Leeming was Assistant Professor of English at the University of Connecticut. He eventually became Professor of English and Comparative Literature at the University of Connecticut, where he in later years has served as Professor Emeritus.

Leeming has written variously in comparative literature of mythology and edited numerous encyclopedias and dictionaries on the subject. He has also written biographies on Beauford Delaney, James Baldwin, and Stephen Spender.

Leeming is a member of the Modern Language Association of America and the Federation of University Teachers.

On July 2, 1967, Leeming married Pamela Elaine Fraser, with whom he has the daughters Margaret Adams and Juliet Ann.

== Selected bibliography ==
- Flights: Readings in Magic, Mysticism, Fantasy, and Myth, 1974.
- Mythology, 1973.
- The World of Myth, 1990.
- James Baldwin: A Biography, 1994.
- Amazing Grace: A Life of Beauford Delaney, 1998
- Stephen Spender: A Life in Modernism, 1999
- A Dictionary of Asian Mythology, 2001.
- Myth: A Biography of Belief, 2002.
- From Olympus to Camelot: The World of European Mythology, 2003.
