= Bruce Lincoln =

American historian of religions

- Born: 1948 (age 77–78)
- Citizenship: United States
- Education: University of Chicago; Haverford College
- Scientific career
- Fields: History of Religions, Indo-Iranian religion, Ritual, Mythology
- Workplaces: University of Chicago; University of Chicago Divinity School
- Doctoral advisor: Mircea Eliade

Bruce Lincoln (born 1948) is Caroline E. Haskell Distinguished Service Professor Emeritus of the History of Religions in the Divinity School of the University of Chicago, where he also holds positions in the Center for Middle Eastern Studies, Committee on the Ancient Mediterranean World, Committee on the History of Culture, and in the departments of Anthropology and Classics (Associate Member). Before his arrival at the University of Chicago, Lincoln taught at the University of Minnesota (1976–1994), where he co-founded the Program in Comparative Studies in Discourse and Society.

For many years his primary scholarly concern was the study of Indo-European religion, where his work came to criticize the ideological presuppositions of research on purported Indo-European origins. Since the late 1990s, his work has dealt extensively with methodological problems, and issues concerning religion, power and politics.

== Education ==
Lincoln graduated from Haverford College in 1970 with a B.A. in Religion, and then took his Ph.D. in the History of Religions from The University of Chicago in 1976, where he wrote his dissertation, "Priests, Warriors, and Cattle: A Comparative Study of East African and Indo-Iranian Religious Systems" under Mircea Eliade. During this time, he also studied under J.A.B. van Buitenen, Carsten Colpe, and Charles Long.

== Awards ==
- Gordon J. Laing Award from the University of Chicago Press in 2002 for Theorizing Myth: Narrative, Ideology, and Scholarship.
- Honorary Doctorate, University of Copenhagen, Faculty of Humanities, 2001.
- American Academy of Religion Award for Excellence in the Study of Religion in 2000 for Theorizing Myth: Narrative, Ideology, and Scholarship.
- Guggenheim Fellowship (Religion), 1982.

== Books ==
- Priests, Warriors, and Cattle: A Study in the Ecology of Religions (University of California Press, 1980)
- Emerging from the Chrysalis: Studies in Rituals of Women's Initiation (Harvard University Press, 1981)
- (ed.) Religion, Rebellion, Revolution: An Interdisciplinary and Cross-Cultural Collection of Essays (St. Martin's Press, 1985)
- Myth, cosmos, and society : Indo-European themes of creation and destruction. Harvard University Press. 1986. ISBN 978-0-674-86429-0. OCLC 988217254.
- Discourse and the Construction of Society (1989)
- Death, War, and Sacrifice: Studies in Ideology and Practice (1991)
- Authority: Construction and Corrosion (1995)
- Theorizing Myth: Narrative, Ideology, and Scholarship (1999)
- Holy Terrors: Thinking about Religion after September 11 (2002)
- Religion, Empire, and Torture: The Case of Achaemenian Persia, with an appendix on Abu Ghraib (University of Chicago Press, 2007)
- Gods and Demons, Priests and Scholars: Critical Explorations in the History of Religions (University of Chicago Press, 2012)
- Happiness for Mankind: Achaemenian Religion and the Imperial Project (Louvain, 2012)
- Comparer en histoire des religions antiques, coedited with Claude Calame (Liège, 2012)
- Politique du paradis: religion et empire en Perse achéménide (Genève, 2015)
- Between History and Myth: Stories of Harald 'Fairhair' and the Founding of the State (University of Chicago Press, 2014)
- Apples and Oranges: Explorations In, On, and With Comparison (University of Chicago Press, 2018)
- Secrets, Lies, and Consequences: A Great Scholar's Hidden Past and his Protégé's Unsolved Murder (Oxford University Press, 2023)
