= Vritra =

Asura in Hinduism

- Personification of drought
- Affiliation: Asura

Genealogy
- Parents: Tvashtr (father); Danu (mother)

Equivalents
- Indo-European: blank

Vritra (Sanskrit: वृत्र, lit. 'enveloper', IAST: Vṛtrá, Vedic Sanskrit pronunciation: [ʋr̩.trɐ́]) is a danava in Hinduism. He serves as the personification of drought, and is an adversary of the king of the devas, Indra. As a danava, he belongs to the race of the asuras. Vritra is also known in the Vedas as Ahi (Sanskrit: अहि, lit. 'snake' IAST: ahi Sanskrit pronunciation: [ɐ.hi]). He appears as a human-like serpent blocking the course of the Rigvedic rivers, and is slain by Indra with his newly forged vajra.

== Etymology ==
Vritra literally means "cover, obstacle", in reference of him holding back the waters. It stems from Proto-Indo-Iranian *wr̥trás, from the Proto-Indo-European root *wer- "to cover, to obstruct". The Indo-Iranian word is also found in Avestan as vərəθraγna (Vedic vṛtraghná), literally "(one who) slays obstacles". Etymolgically related to the god Varuna, as they are both binders/envelopers, connected to waters and in semantic opposition of Indra. However this close etymolgy doesn't make them identical in mythological aspect. Functionally Vrtra is related to Jörmungandr of Norse myth, Typhon of Greek myth, and a dragon of Slavic myth, which is mentioned in the 15th century apocryphal text Conversations with Saint Ephiphanius and Saint Andrew.

== Literature ==
=== Vedas ===
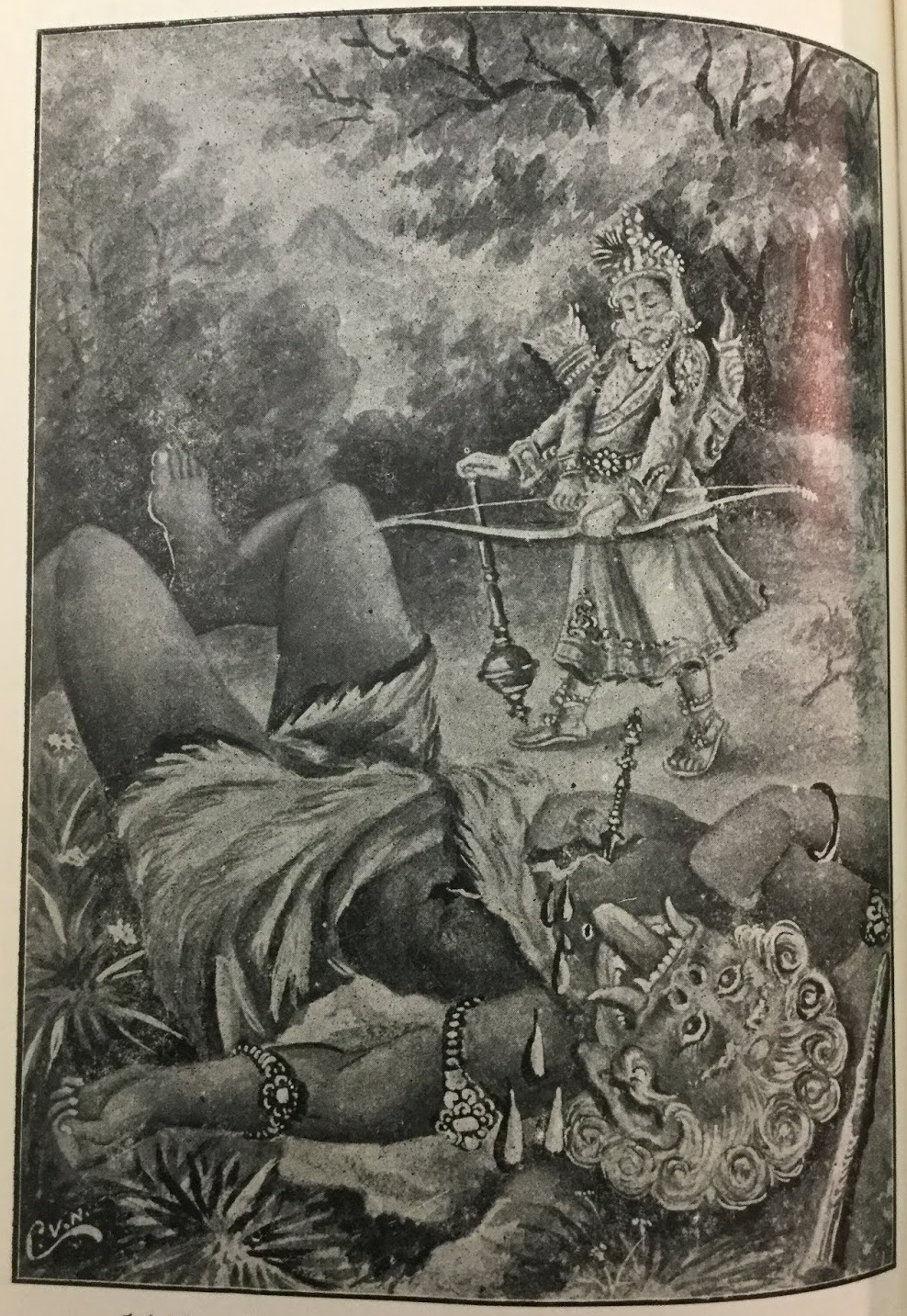
Indra kills Vritrasura (story from the Rig Veda, featured in Bhagavata)

According to the Rig Veda, Vritra kept the waters of the world captive until he was killed by Indra, who destroyed all the 99 fortresses of Vritra (although the fortresses are sometimes attributed to Sambara) before liberating the imprisoned rivers. The combat began soon after Indra was born, and he consumed a large volume of Soma at Tvashtri's house to empower him before facing Vritra. Tvashtri fashioned the thunderbolt (Vajrayudha) for Indra, and Vishnu, when asked to do so by Indra, made space for the battle by taking the three great strides, for which Vishnu became famous, and was later adapted in his legend of Vamana.

Vritra broke Indra's two jaws during the battle, but was then thrown down by Indra and, in falling, crushed the fortresses that had already been shattered. For this feat, Indra became known as "Vṛtrahan" (lit. "Slayer of Vritra" and also as "slayer of the first-born of dragons").

Vritra's mother, Danu, who was also the mother of the danava race of asuras, was then attacked and defeated by Indra with his thunderbolt. In one of the versions of the story, three devas – Varuna, Soma, and Agni – were coaxed by Indra into aiding him in the fight against Vritra, whereas before they had been on the side of Vritra (whom they called "Father").

Hymn 18 of Mandala IV provides the most elaborate account of the Vedic version. The verses describe the events and circumstances leading up to the battle between Indra and Vritra, the battle itself, and the outcome of the battle.

=== Mahabharata ===
As told in the narration given to King Yudhishthira in the Mahabharata, Vritra was an asura created by the artisan god Tvashtri to avenge the killing of his son known as Triśiras or Viśvarūpa by Indra. Vritra won the battle and swallowed Indra, but the other deities forced him to vomit Indra out. The battle continued and Indra was eventually forced to flee. Vishnu and the rishis (sages) brokered a truce, with Indra swearing that he would not attack Vritra with anything made of metal, wood or stone, nor anything that was dry or wet, or during the day or the night.

After this, Indra managed to befriend Vritra. Once, while Vritra was asleep on the seashore at twilight, Indra collected sea-foam as a weapon to kill Vritra, as it was neither wet nor dry, neither wood nor any metal and it certainly could not be categorized as a weapon. Indra summoned Lord Vishnu to enter the foam. When the Vishnu entered the foam, Indra used that foam to kill him.

=== Puranas ===
The Srimad Bhagavatam recognizes Vritra as a bhakta (devotee) of Vishnu who was slain only due to his failure to live piously and without aggression. This story runs thus:

SB 6.9.11: After Visvarupa was killed, his father, Tvashta, performed ritualistic ceremonies to kill Indra. He offered oblations in the sacrificial fire, saying, "O enemy of Indra, flourish to kill your enemy without delay."

SB 6.9.12: Thereafter, from the southern side of the sacrificial fire known as Anvaharya came a fearful personality who looked like the destroyer of the entire creation at the end of the millennium.

SB 6.9.13-17: Like arrows released in the four directions, the demon's body grew, day after day. Tall and blackish, he appeared like a burnt hill and was as lustrous as a bright array of clouds in the evening. The hair on the demon's body and his beard and moustache were the colour of melted copper, and his eyes were piercing like the midday sun. He appeared unconquerable as if holding the three worlds on the points of his blazing trident. Dancing and shouting with a loud voice, he made the entire surface of the earth tremble as if from an earthquake. As he yawned, again and again, he seemed to be trying to swallow the whole sky with his mouth, which was as deep as a cave. He seemed to be licking up all the stars in the sky with his tongue and eating the entire universe with his long, sharp teeth. Seeing this gigantic demon, everyone, in great fear, ran here and there in all directions.

SB 6.9.18: That very fearful demon, who was actually the son of Tvashta, covered all the planetary systems by dint of austerity. Therefore, he was named Vritra, or one who covers everything.

Vritra became the head of the asuras (portrayed as inherently malicious here, as opposed to the Vedic version, in which they may be benevolent or malevolent). He renounced his dharma – duty – to do good unto others and turned to violence, battling with the devas. Eventually, he gained the upper hand, and the devas were frightened of his evil might. Led by Indra, they approached Vishnu for help. He told them that Vritra could not be destroyed by ordinary means, revealing that only a weapon made from the bones of a sage could slay him. When the deities revealed their doubts about the likelihood of any ascetic donating his body, Vishnu directed them to approach the rishi Dadhichi. When approached by the deities, Dadhichi gladly gave up his bones for the cause of the good, stating that it would be better for his bones to help them attain victory than to rot in the ground. The devas collected the bones and Indra crafted the Vajrayudha from them. When they engaged Vritra again, the battle lasted for 360 days before Vritra died.

In Vaishnavism, Vritra is depicted to be a devotee of Vishnu. In the Srimad Bhagavatam, when the vajra-armed Indra and the devas battle against Vritra and his asuras, the Vritra proclaims that were he to fall in battle, he would be blessed, since the vajra was imbued with the power of Vishnu and Dadhichi. During the single combat between Indra and Vritra, the former drops his vajra when he is struck on the cheek. Even as the devas gasp, Vritra merely advises him to pick up his weapon, since life and death are the same for him, as he believes that they are all instruments of Vishnu. Indra marvels at the asura's devotion to the preserver deity. When the king of the devas succeeds in slicing both of his opponent's arms, the latter swallows him whole, along with Airavata. Protected by Vishnu, Indra cuts open the belly of Vritra and escapes, finally beheading him with the vajra. Vritra ascends to Vaikuntha upon his death.

According to the Puranas, the terrible anthropomorphic personification of Brāhmanahatya (Brahmanicide) chased Indra and forced him into hiding for his sin, and Nahusha was invited to take his place.

== Buddhism ==
In the Pali Canon, Vritra is alluded to when the Buddha addresses Śakra with the title "Vatrabhū."

== See also ==
- Jörmungandr
- Susna
- Typhon
- Vala (Vritra's brother)
- Vedic mythology
- Veles
- Verethragna
- Yamata no Orochi
- Yato-no-kami
- Nāga
- Mahoraga
