= Georges Dumézil =

French philologist and historian (1898–1986)

- Born: Georges Edmond Raoul Dumézil; 4 March 1898; Paris, France
- Died: 11 October 1986 (aged 88); Paris, France
- Occupations: Philologist, linguist, religious studies scholar
- Spouse: Madeleine Legrand (after 1925)
- Children: 2

Academic background
- Education: École normale supérieure
- Thesis: Le festin d'immortalité (1924)
- Doctoral advisor: Antoine Meillet
- Other advisor: Michel Bréal
- Influences: Max Müller; James George Frazer; Ernst Kuhn; Émile Durkheim; Marcel Granet; Hermann Güntert; Jan de Vries; Otto Höfler; Émile Benveniste; Stig Wikander

Academic work
- Discipline: Philology
- Sub-discipline: Comparative mythology; Indo-European studies
- Institutions: Istanbul University; École pratique des hautes études; Collège de France
- Main interests: Proto-Indo-European mythology and society
- Notable works: Mythe et epopee (1968–1973)
- Notable ideas: Trifunctional hypothesis
- Influenced: Jan de Vries; Otto Höfler; Stig Wikander; Émile Benveniste; Mircea Eliade; Claude Lévi-Strauss; Gabriel Turville-Petre; Werner Betz; Edgar C. Polomé; Jaan Puhvel; C. Scott Littleton; Dean A. Miller; Nicholas Allen

Signature
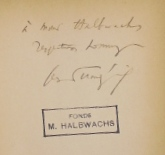

Georges Edmond Raoul Dumézil (French: [dymezil]; 4 March 1898 – 11 October 1986) was a French philologist, linguist, and religious studies scholar who specialized in comparative linguistics and mythology.

He was a professor at Istanbul University, École pratique des hautes études and the Collège de France, and a member of the Académie Française. Dumézil is well known for his formulation of the trifunctional hypothesis on Proto-Indo-European mythology and society. His research has had a major influence on the fields of comparative mythology and Indo-European studies. In the 1930s he was a supporter (though not a formal member) of the far-right group Action Française, leading to criticism from left-wing scholars in the 1980s and afterwards.

== Early life and education ==
Georges Dumézil was born in Paris, France, on 4 March 1898, the son of Jean Dumézil and Marguerite Dutier. His father was a highly educated general in the French Army.

Dumézil received an elite education in Paris at the Collège de Neufchâteau, Lycée de Troyes, Lycée Louis-le-Grand and Lycée de Tarbes. He came to master Ancient Greek and Latin at an early age. Through the influence of Michel Bréal, who was a student of Franz Bopp and the grandfather of one of Dumézil's friends, Dumézil came to master Sanskrit, and developed a strong interest in Indo-European mythology and religion. He began studying at École normale supérieure (ENS) in 1916. During World War I, Dumézil served as an artillery officer in the French Army, for which he received the Croix de Guerre. His father was inspector-general of the French artillery corps during the war.

Dumézil returned to his studies at ENS in 1919. His most important teacher there was Antoine Meillet, who gave him a rigorous introduction in Iranian and Indo-European linguistics. Meillet was to have a great influence on Dumézil. Unlike other students of Meillet, Dumézil was more interested in mythology than linguistics. In the 19th century, philologists such as Franz Felix Adalbert Kuhn, Max Müller and Elard Hugo Meyer (who had influenced Bréal) had conducted notable work on comparative mythology, but their theories had since been found to be mostly untenable. Dumézil became determined to restore the field of comparative mythology from its contemporary discredit.

Dumézil lectured at Lycée de Beauvais in 1920, and taught French at the University of Warsaw in 1920–1921. While lecturing at Warsaw, Dumézil was struck by striking similarities between Sanskrit literature and the works of Ovid, which suggested to him that these pieces of literature contained traces of a common Indo-European heritage.

Dumézil gained his PhD in comparative religion in 1924 with the thesis Le festin d'immortalité. Inspired by the "works of Ernst Kuhn, the thesis examined ritual drinks in Indo-Iranian, Germanic, Celtic, Slavic and Italic religion. Dumézil's early writings were also inspired by the research of James George Frazer, whose views were however becoming discredited due to advances in the field of anthropology. At ENS, Dumézil became a close friend of Pierre Gaxotte. Gaxotte was a follower of Charles Maurras, leader of the nationalist Action Française movement. Though some later accused Dumézil of being in sympathy with Action Française, Dumézil denied this, and was never a member of the organization.

Dumézil's PhD thesis was highly praised by Meillet, who requested Marcel Mauss and Henri Hubert, both followers of Émile Durkheim, to assist Dumézil with further studies. For reasons unknown, the request was turned down. Mauss and Hubert were both socialists in the spirit of Jean Jaurès, who actively used their academic influence to advance their own political ideology. Hubert in particular was a fervent Dreyfusard known for his philosemitism, republicanism, anti-racism and Germanophobia. Dumézil had deliberately avoided attending Hubert's lectures, and had to be convinced by Meillet to provide Hubert with a copy of his PhD thesis, which Hubert subsequently bitterly criticized. The refusal of Mauss and Hubert to provide Dumézil with a position may have been motivated by suspicions that Dumézil did not agree with them politically. The rejection by Hubert led to Dumézil losing support from Meillet as well. Meilett informed Dumézil that it would be impossible for him to acquire a position in France, and encouraged him to move abroad.

== Early career ==
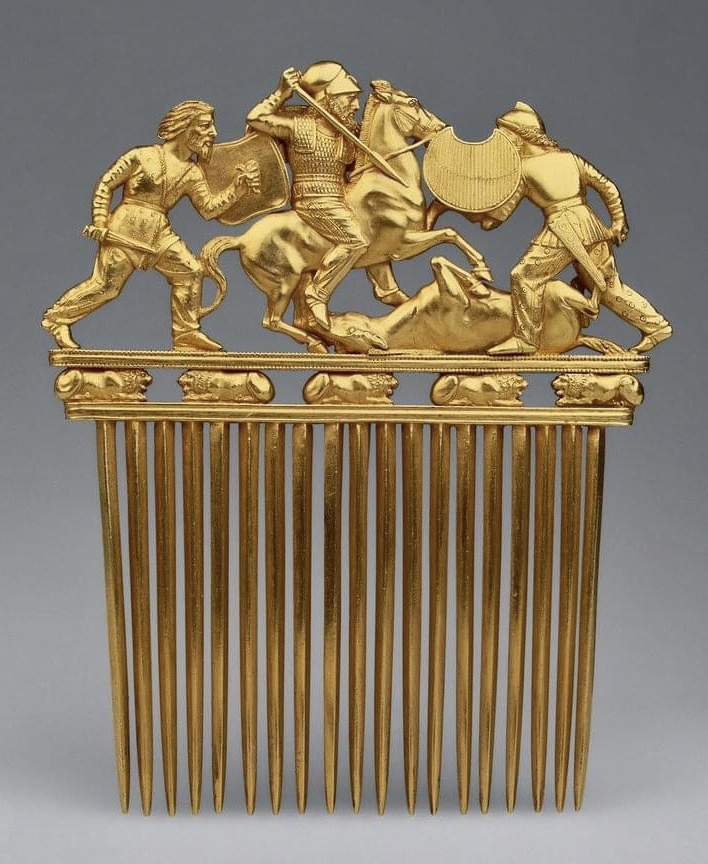
Scythian comb from Solokha. Dumézil was greatly interested in Scythian and Ossetian mythology, and its relationship with wider Indo-European mythology.

From 1925 to 1931, Dumézil was Professor of the History of Religions at Istanbul University. During his years in Istanbul, Dumézil acquired proficiency in Armenian and Ossetian, and many non-Indo-European languages of the Caucasus. This enabled him to study the Nart saga, on which he published a number of influential monographs. Dumézil developed a strong interest in the Ossetians and their mythology, which was to prove indispensable for his future research. For the rest of his life, Dumézil would make yearly visits to Istanbul to conduct field research among Ossetians in Turkey. During this time he also published his Le problème des centaures (1929), which examined similarities in Greek and Indo-Iranian. It was inspired by Elard Hugo Meyer. Together with Le festin d'immortalité (1924) and Le crime des Lemniennes (1924), Le problème des centaures would form part of the works Dumézil referred to as his "Ambrosia cycle".

Dumézil's work in Istanbul would be of enormous importance to his future research, and he would later consider his years in Istanbul as the happiest of his life. In 1930, Dumézil published his important La préhistoire indo-iranienne des castes. Drawing upon evidence from Avestan, Persian, Greek, Ossetian and Arabic sources, Dumézil suggested that ancient Indo-Iranians, including the Scythians, maintained a caste system which had been established before the Indo-Iranian migrations into South Asia. This article eventually caught the attention of French linguist Émile Benveniste, with whom Dumézil entered a fruitful correspondence.

From 1931 to 1933, Dumézil taught French at Uppsala University. Here he became acquainted with the influential professor Henrik Samuel Nyberg and the latter's favourite students, Stig Wikander and Geo Widengren. Through Wikander and Widengren, Dumézil further became acquainted with Otto Höfler. Wikander, Widengren and Höfler would remain lifelong friends and intellectual collaborators of Dumézil. Throughout their careers, these scholars would have a strong influence on each other's research. Most notably, Höfler's research on the Germanic comitatus, and Wikander's subsequent research on related warrior fraternities among early Indo-Iranians, would have enormous influence on Dumézil's later research.

== Return to France ==
Dumézil returned to France in 1933, where he through the assistance of Sylvain Lévi, a friend of Meillet, was able to gain a position at the École pratique des hautes études (EPHE). From 1935 to 1968, Dumézil was Director of Studies at the Department of Comparative Religion at EPHE. In this capacity he was responsible for teaching and research on Indo-European religions. Students of Dumézil during this time include Roger Caillois. At EPHE, through the recommendation of Lévi, Dumézil also attended lectures by sinologist Marcel Granet, whose methodology for the study of religions was to have a strong influence on Dumézil. Seeking to acquire knowledge of non-Indo-European cultures, Dumézil became proficient in Chinese and gained a deep understanding of Chinese mythology.

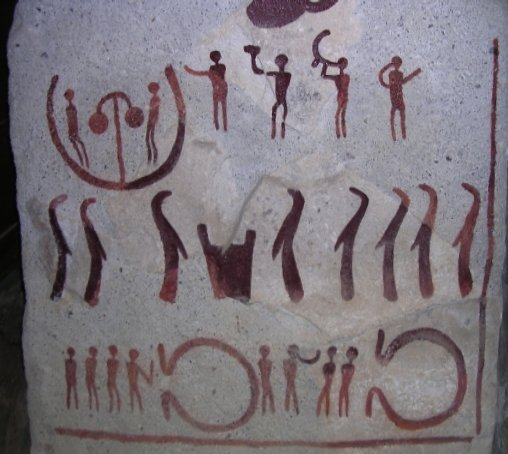
Depiction of ancient rituals on a Nordic Bronze Age stone slab from The King's Grave in southern Sweden. In his trifunctional hypothesis, Dumézil suggested that Proto-Indo-European society was characterized by an ideology in which the Proto-Indo-Europeans and their deities were hierarchically divided into classes of priests, warriors and producers.

In his research on the social structure of ancient Indo-Iranians, Dumézil was greatly aided by Benveniste, who had earlier been critical of Dumézil's theories. During his early years at EPHE, Dumézil modified many of his theories. Most importantly, he increasingly shifted his focus from linguistic evidence to evidence from ancient social structures. Iranologists who influenced Dumézil in this approach included Arthur Christensen, James Darmesteter, Hermann Güntert and Herman Lommel. Notable works of Dumézil from this period include Ouranos-Varuna (1934) and Flamen-Brahman (1935). Ouranos-Varuna examined similarities in Greek and Vedic mythology, while Flamen-Brahman examined the existence of a distinct priestly class among the Proto-Indo-Europeans.

In the early 1930s, under the pseudonym "Georges Marcenay", he wrote some articles for the right-wing newspapers Candide and Le Jour, where he advocated an alliance between France and Italy against Nazi Germany. Dumézil's opposition to Nazism figures prominently in several of his later works on Germanic religion. At this time, Dumézil joined the Grande Loge de France, a pro-Jewish Masonic lodge, for which he would later be persecuted by the Nazis.

== Formulation of the trifunctional hypothesis ==
In the late 1930s, Dumézil broadened his research to include the study of Germanic religion. His research on Germanic religion was greatly influenced by the renowned Dutch philologist Jan de Vries, and also by Höfler. It was while lecturing on the Indo-European component in Germanic religion at Uppsala University in the spring of 1938 that Dumézil made a major discovery which was to revolutionize his future research. In his subsequent Mythes et dieux des Germains (1939), Dumézil found that early Germanic society was characterized by the same social divisions as those among the early Indo-Iranians. On this basis, Dumézil formulated his trifunctional hypothesis, which argued that ancient Indo-European societies were characterized by a trifunctional hierarchy composed of priests, warriors and producers.

In Dumézil's trifunctional model, the priests were responsible for the "maintenance of cosmic and juridical sovereignty", while warriors were tasked with the "exercise of physical prowess", and the commoners were responsible for "the promotion of physical well-being, fertility, wealth, and so on". In Norse mythology, these functions were according to Dumézil represented by Týr and Odin, Thor, and Njörðr and Freyr, while in Vedic mythology, they were represented by Varuna and Mitra, Indra, and the Aśvins. Dumézil's trifunctional hypothesis would come to revolutionize modern research on ancient civilizations.

== Career during World War II ==
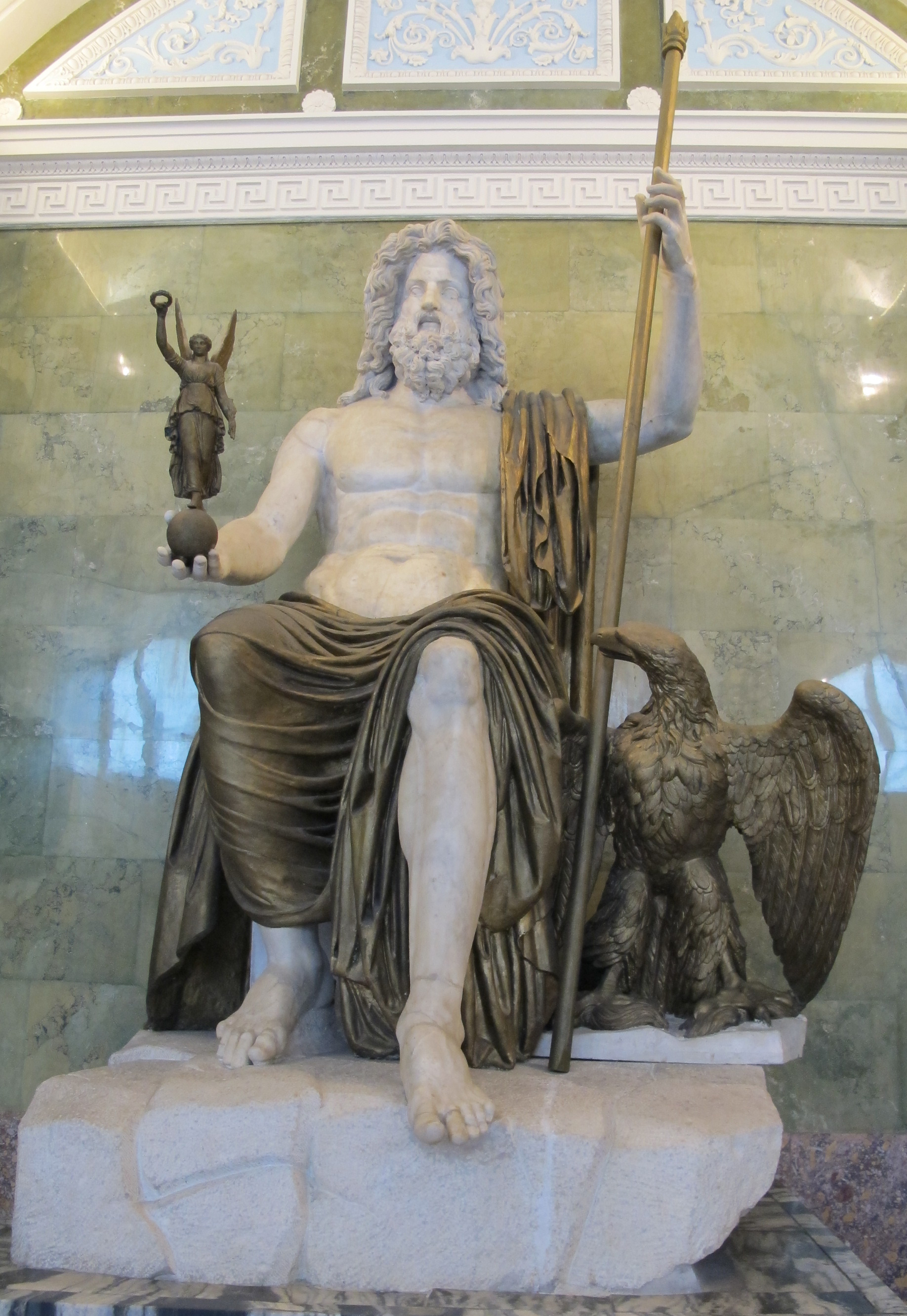
Marble statue of the Roman sky god Jupiter. During World War II, Dumézil conducted pioneering studies on Roman mythology.

In the prelude to World War II, Dumézil returned to military service as a captain of the reserves in the French Army. He was subsequently posted at Liège as a liaison officer with the Belgian Army. Through the assistance of Maxime Weygand, a friend of his father, Dumézil was in April 1940 posted to the French military mission in Ankara, Turkey, where he remained during the Battle of France. He was repatriated to France in September 1940, and subsequently returned to full-time teaching at EPHE. Because he had been a Freemason as a young man, Dumézil was fired from EPHE by the pro-Nazi Vichy government in early 1941. Through the influence of colleagues, he was however able to regain his position in the fall of 1943.

During the war, Dumézil significantly reformulated his theories, and applied his trifunctional hypothesis to the study of Indo-Iranians, most notably in his work Mitra-Varuna (1940). In this work, Dumézil suggested that the Indo-Iranian gods Mitra and Varuna represented juridical and religious sovereignty respectively, and that these functions were relics of an earlier Indo-European tradition also manifested in Roman and Norse mythology. In works such as Jupiter, Mars, Quirinus (1941), Horace et les Curiaces (1942), Servius et la Fortune (1943) and Naissance de Rome (1944), Dumézil applied his trifunctional hypothesis to the study of the Indo-European heritage of ancient Rome.

== Expanding the trifunctional hypothesis ==
From the late 1940s onwards, the comparative study of Vedic, Roman and Norse mythology and society would constitute the main focus of Dumézil's research. Iranian and Greek mythology played less conspicuous roles in his research. Naissance des archanges (1945) is his sole book on Iranian and Zoroastrian material. In this work, Dumézil suggests that the pantheon of the Mitanni was derived from an earlier pantheon shared by all Indo-Iranians, and that the main deities in the Indo-Iranian pantheon represented the three functions of Indo-European society. According to Dumézil, it was only during the rise of Zoroaster that Ahura Mazda became the chief deity in Iranian mythology.

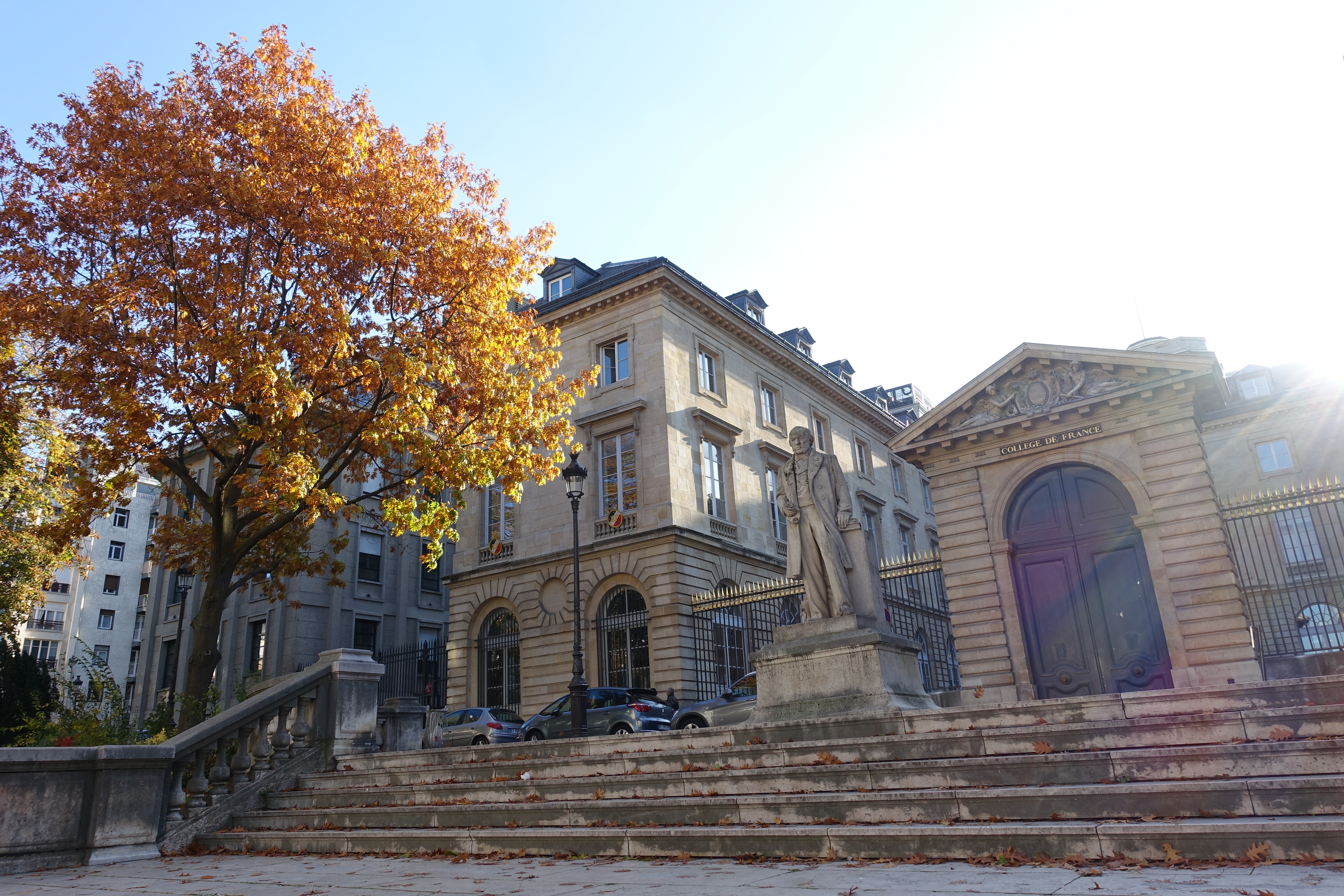
Collège de France, where Dumézil from 1949 to 1968 served as Chair of Indo-European Civilization

In the years immediately after World War II, Dumézil recruited Claude Lévi-Strauss and Mircea Eliade to EPHE, and both became close friends whom he strongly influenced. These three men are widely considered the most influential mythographers of all time. Notable works published by Dumézil in the late 1940s include Tarpeia (1947), Loki (1948), L'Héritage Indo-Européen à Rome (1949) and Le Troisième souverain (1949). The latter work examined the role of Aryaman and his Indo-European counterparts, such the Norse god Heimdallr, in wider Indo-European mythology. Through several influential works of his friend Wikander, Dumézil came to doubt the universalist theories of Durkheim and Lévi-Strauss, and thus contended that the trifunctional structure of Indo-European society was a distinct characteristic of the Indo-Europeans. Dumézil had studied the languages and mythology of several indigenous peoples of the Americas, and contended that trifunctionalism was not prevalent among those peoples.

Dumézil was elected to the Collège de France in 1949, where he until 1968 was Chair of Indo-European Civilization. This position was specifically created for him. In the 1950s and 1960s, Dumézil's theories gained increasing acceptance among scholars. The spread of Dumézil's theories was greatly aided by support he received from friends such as Émile Benveniste, Stig Wikander, Otto Höfler and Jan de Vries. Notable Iranologists who adopted Dumézil's theories include Benveniste, Wikander, Geo Widengren, Jacques Duchesne-Guillemin and Marijan Mole. Dumézil was however also criticized by certain Indologists, Iranologists and Romanists. Indologist Paul Thieme notably argued that the gods of the Mitanni were distinctly Indo-Aryan rather than Indo-Iranian, and that Dumézil's reconstruction of Indo-Iranian religion was thus mistaken. Dumézil responded vigorously to such criticism, while also continuously refining his theories. Most notably, Dumézil modified his theories on the trifunctional Indo-European social structure, which he now regarded more as an ideology than an established system.

In 1955, Dumézil spent several months as a visiting professor at the University of Lima, during which he dedicated much time to the study of the language and mythology of the Quechua people. During the 1950s, Dumézil conducted much research on what he hypothesised to be a war between the various functions in Indo-European mythology, which he suggested culminated in the incorporation of the third function into the first and second function. Dumézil's ideas on this topic were published in Aspects de la fonction guerrière chez les Indo-Européens (1956). Other notable works published by Dumézil in the 1950s include Hadingus (1953), and several works on Roman, Celtic and Germanic religion. His L'Idéologie tripartie des Indo-Européens, published in 1958, has been described as the best introductory work on Dumézil's core ideas.

== Retirement ==
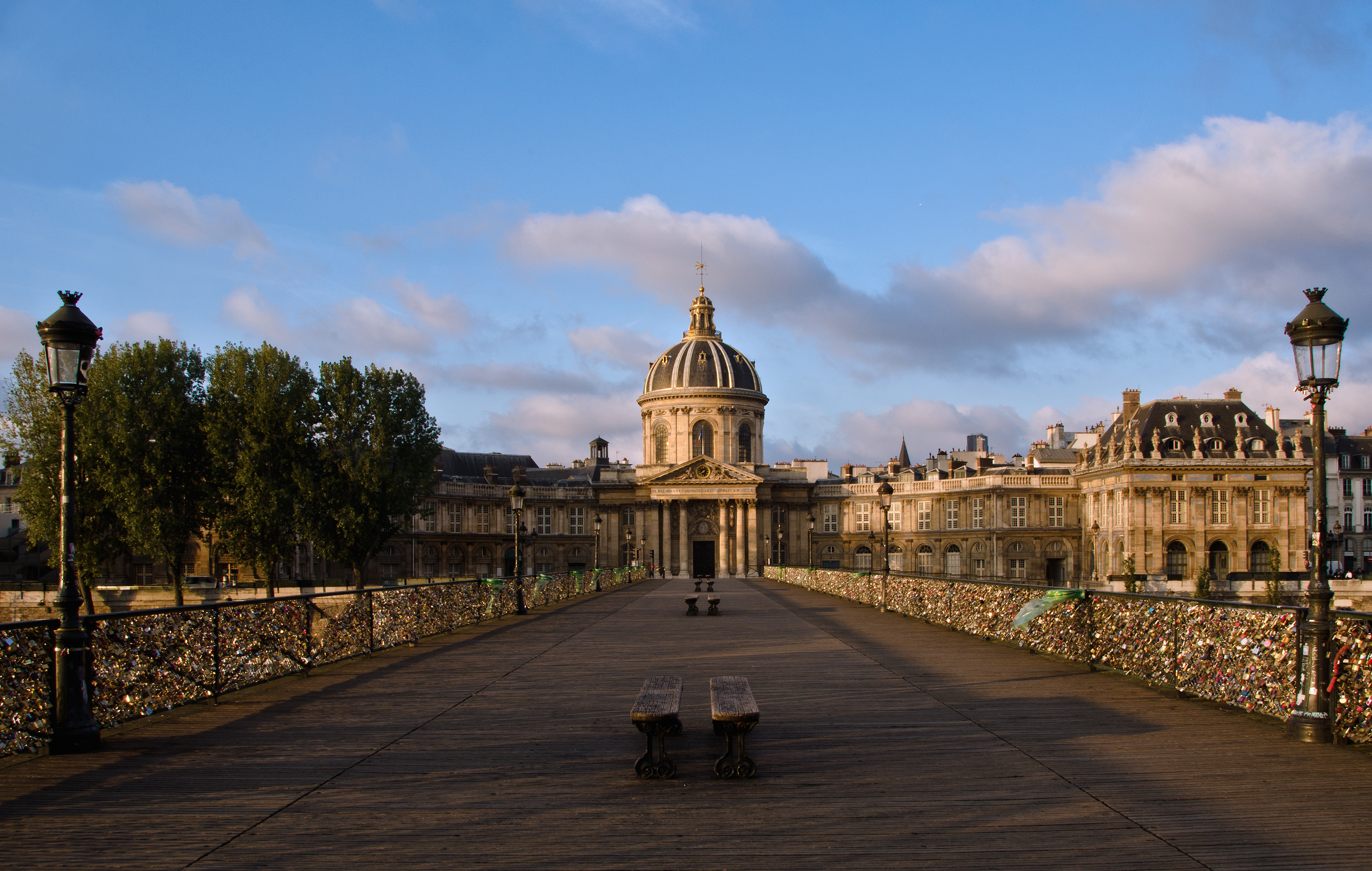
Académie Française, to which Dumézil was elected in 1975

Dumézil retired from teaching in 1968, but nevertheless continued a vigorous program of research and writing until his death. He would eventually become proficient in more than 40 languages, including all branches of the Indo-European languages, most languages of the Caucasus, and indigenous languages of the Americas (most notably Quechuan). Dumézil is credited with having saved the Ubykh language from extinction. His magnum opus, Mythe et épopée, published in three volumes (1968-1973) provides a thorough overview of the trifunctional ideology of Indo-European mythology. In 1974, Dumézil would earn the Prix Paul Valery for this work.

Dumézil's research has been credited with being largely responsible for the revival of Indo-European studies and comparative mythology in the latter part of the 20th century. He was generally regarded as the world's foremost expert on the comparative study of Indo-European mythology. From the late 1960s towards the end of his life, Dumézil's research came to be widely celebrated in the United States, where many of his works on Indo-European mythology were translated into English and published. Additional works inspired by Dumézil's theories were also published in the United States by scholars such as Jaan Puhvel, C. Scott Littleton, Donald J. Ward, Udo Strutynski and Dean A. Miller. Many of these scholars were associated with the University of California, Los Angeles (UCLA).

Dumézil was made an Honorary Professor of the Collège de France in 1969, and became a Member of the Académie des Inscriptions et Belles-Lettres in 1970. Dumézil was a visiting professor at UCLA in 1971. He was elected to the highly prestigious Académie Française in 1975. His election to the Académie Française was sponsored by Lévi-Strauss, who gave him the welcoming address. Dumézil was also an Associate Member of the Royal Academy of Science, Letters and Fine Arts of Belgium, Corresponding Member of the Austrian Academy of Sciences, Honorary Member of the Royal Irish Academy, Honorary Fellow of the Royal Anthropological Institute of Great Britain and Ireland, and the recipient of honorary doctorates from the universities of Uppsala, Istanbul, Berne and Liège. He was an Officer of the Legion of Honor.

In the 1970s and 1980s, Dumézil vigorously continued with research and publishing, and devoted himself particularly to the study of the Indo-European components in Ossetian and Scythian mythology. The much awaited third edition of his Mitra-Varuna was published in 1977. He received the Prix mondial Cino Del Duca in 1984.

In his later years, Dumézil became a visible figure in French society, and was frequently interviewed and cited in the public press. His theories on Indo-European society were celebrated by Nouvelle Droite figures such as Alain de Benoist, Michel Poniatowski and Jean Haudry, but Dumézil was careful to distance himself from them. Dumézil openly identified with the political right, but always presented his works as apolitical, and had many friends and admirers on the left, such as Michel Foucault.

== Personal life and death ==
Animated map of Indo-European migrations in accordance with the Kurgan hypothesis. Dumézil's research, along with that of Marija Gimbutas, formed a basis for modern Indo-European studies.

Dumézil died in Paris from a massive stroke on 11 October 1986. He had deliberately refrained from writing a memoir, believing that the legacy of his work should stand on its scholarly merits alone. However, shortly before his death, Dumézil gave a series of in-depth interviews with his defender Eribon, which were subsequently published in Entretiens avec Georges Dumézil (1987). This book remains the closest Dumézil ever came to writing a memoir. Upon his death, Dumézil left a number of unfinished works on Indo-European mythology, some of which were subsequently edited by his friends and published.

Dumézil married Madeleine Legrand in 1925, with whom he had a son and a daughter.

== Legacy and reception ==
=== Indo-European studies ===
Throughout his career, Dumézil published more than seventy-five books and hundreds of scholarly articles. His research continues to have a strong influence among Indo-Europeanists, classicists, Celticists, Germanicists, and Indologists. Prominent scholars heavily influenced by Dumézil include Emile Benveniste, Stig Wikander, Jan de Vries, Gabriel Turville-Petre, Werner Betz, Edgar C. Polomé, Jaan Puvhvel, Joël Grisward, Nicholas Allen, Georges Charachidzé, François-Xavier Dillmann, Jacques Duchesne-Guillemin, Daniel Dubuisson, Lucien Gerschel, Emily Lyle, Dean A. Miller, Alwyn Rees, Brinley Rees, Robert Schilling, Bernard Sergent, Udo Strutynski, Donald J. Ward and Atsuhiko Yoshida. Along with Marija Gimbutas, Dumézil's research continues to form the basis for modern Indo-European studies. His formulation of the trifunctional hypothesis has been described by C. Scott Littleton as one of the most important scholarly achievements of the 20th century. Since 1995, the Académie Française awards the annual Prix Georges Dumézil for a work of philology.

Some critics, particularly adherents of Lévi-Strauss, contended that the mythological and social structures Dumézil identified with Indo-Europeans were not distinctly Indo-European, but rather characteristic of all humanity. Among those were Colin Renfrew, who doubts that Indo-Europeans had anything distinctly in common beyond speaking Indo-European languages.

=== Criticism of political affiliations ===
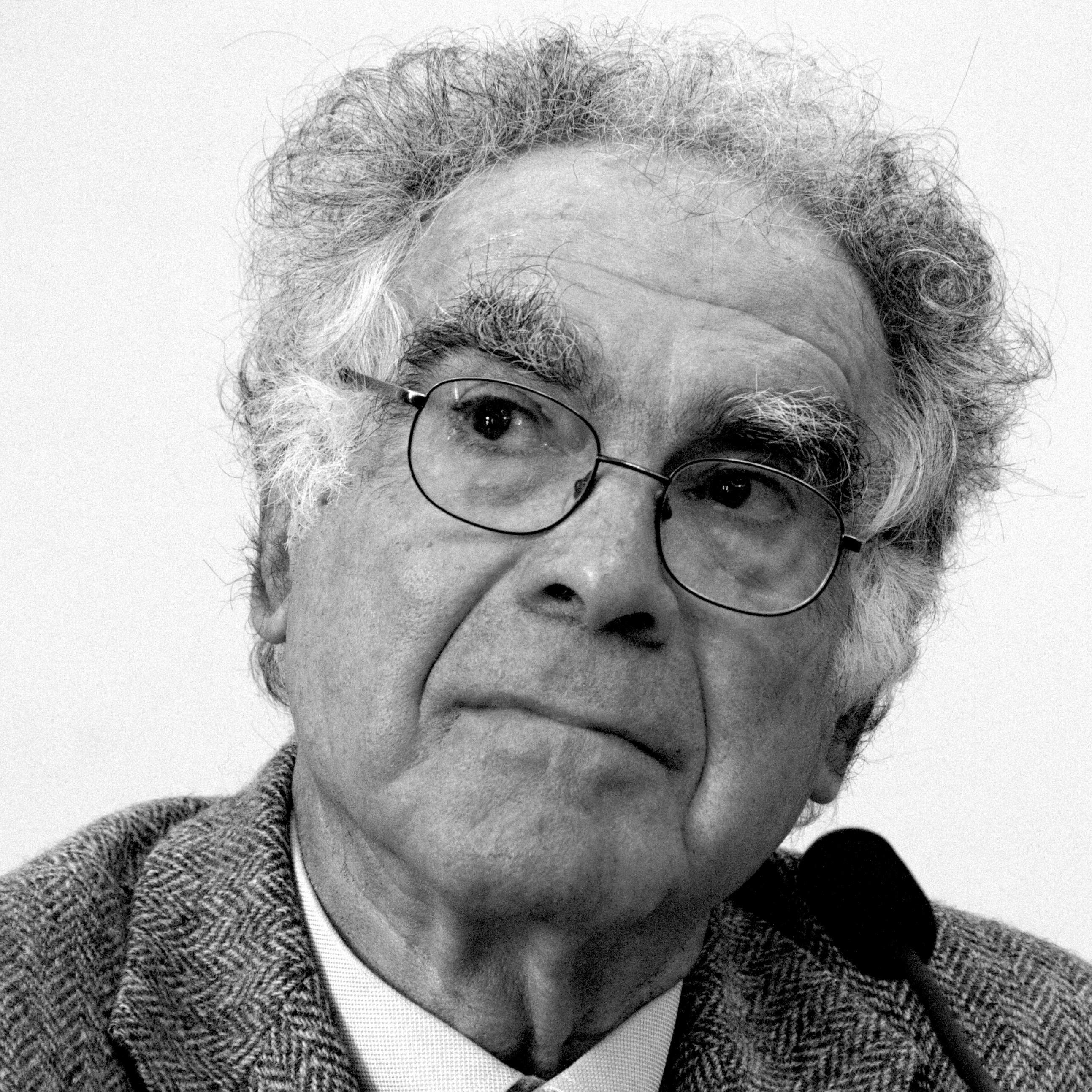
Carlo Ginzburg charged Dumézil with having "sympathy for Nazi culture" for his works on Germanic and Indo-European religion, and accused Dumézil of conspiring to undermine "Judeo-Christian" values.

In the 1980–1990s, Dumézil came under heavy criticism from certain scholars, particularly left-wing historians, who accused Dumézil of being a crypto-Fascist and a neo-traditionalist, by implicitly defending in his scholarly writings the restoration of a traditional hierarchical order in Europe (e.g. the three estates). Many of these critics pointed out that Dumézil's lifelong close friend Pierre Gaxotte had been the secretary of Action Française leader Charles Maurras, and that his work had been influential on members of the European New Right, including Alain de Benoist, Jean Haudry, or Roger Pearson, who used his theories to support far-right political positions, with an "Indo-European race" (conflated with white people) being seen as superior to all other peoples. Bruce Lincoln has argued that Dumézil "maintained a cautiously ambiguous relation" with Nouvelle Droite figures like de Benoist and Haudry, "both of whom courted him avidly".

During the 1930s, Dumézil supported the far-right, royalist, anti-democratic, and anti-German Action Française. While he held for a while Benito Mussolini in high regard, he steadfastly opposed Nazism and voiced as a journalist his opposition to the growing danger posed by German nationalism. However, Dumézil never joined Action Française, contending that "too many things separated [him] from them. The credo of Action Française was a block: it forbade both appreciating Edmond Rostand and believing in the innocence of Captain Dreyfus." Furthermore, Dumézil joined Freemasonry in the early 1930s as a member of the Portique lodge of the Grande Loge de France of the Scottish Rite, and was consequently dismissed from his teaching positions and from the civil service by the collaborationist Vichy State during World War II.

The harshest critics of Dumézil were Arnaldo Momigliano and Carlo Ginzburg, who charged Dumézil with having "sympathy for Nazi culture" due to his writings on Germanic religion in the 1930s. They also accused Dumézil's trifunctional hypothesis of similarity with Fascism, and wrote that his reconstruction of Indo-European society was motivated by a desire to abolish "Judeo-Christian" values. Momigliano had himself been a member of the National Fascist Party in the 1930s, but was not open about this.

Dumézil was defended by many colleagues, including C. Scott Littleton, Jaan Puhvel, Edgar C. Polomé, Dean A. Miller, Udo Strutynski, and most notably Didier Eribon. Polomé and Miller saw the criticism of Dumézil as an expression of political correctness and Marxist ideology, and questioned the scholarly credentials of the critics. Dumézil himself responded vigorously to these accusations, pointing out that he had never been a member of a Fascist organization, never been sympathetic to Fascist ideology, and that the ancient Indo-European hierarchical social structure never appealed to him. In order to clarify his political position, he declared to Éribon in 1987: "the principle, not simply monarchical, but dynastic, which protects the highest office of the State from caprices and ambitions, seemed to me, and still seems to me, preferable to the generalized election in which we have been living since Danton and Bonaparte. The example of the [constitutional] monarchies of the North (of Europe) confirmed to me this feeling. Of course, the formula is not applicable in France."

Accusations of Fascist sympathies continued after Dumézil's death. Eribon's Faut-il brûler Dumézil? (1992) has been credited with permanently debunking accusations that Dumézil was a crypto-Fascist. Charges of Fascist sympathies have nevertheless continued to be leveled, most notably by Eliade's former student Bruce Lincoln. Inspired by the critique of Momigliano and Ginzburg, Lincoln has criticized Dumézil from a Marxist perspective, and suggested that Dumézil was a Germanophobic Fascist. Similar accusations have also been leveled by the Swedish Marxist historian Stefan Arvidsson, who hopes that the "exposure" of Dumézil's alleged political Fascist sympathies may lead to the abolition ("Ragnarök") of the concept of Indo-European mythology.

== Honours and awards ==
=== Honours ===
- Officier of the Legion of Honour
- Croix de Guerre 1914-1918
- Commander of the Ordre des Palmes académiques

=== Recognition ===
- Member of the Académie Française
- Member of the Académie des Inscriptions et Belles-Lettres
- Member of the Royal Academy of Science, Letters and Fine Arts of Belgium
- Member of the Austrian Academy of Sciences
- Member of the Royal Irish Academy

=== Honorary degrees ===
- University of Liège
- University of Bern
- Uppsala University
- Istanbul University

=== Awards ===
- Prix mondial Cino Del Duca

== Selected works ==
- —— (1924). Le crime des Lemniennes: rites et légendes du monde Égéen (in French). Paris: Geuthner. ISBN 978-2-7053-1071-4.
- —— (1924). Le festin d'immortalité: Etude de mythologie comparée indo-européenne. Annales du Musée Guimet, Bibliothèque d'études (in French). Vol. 34. Paris: Geuthner.
- —— (1929). Le problème des Centaures: Etude de mythologie comparée indo-européenne. Annales du Musée Guimet, Bibliothèque d'études (in French). Vol. 41. Paris: Geuthner. BnF 320570351.
- —— (1930). Légendes sur les Nartes: suivies de cinq notes mythologiques (in French). Paris: Champion.
- —— (1931). La langue des Oubykhs (in French). Paris: Champion.
- —— (1932). Études comparatives sur les langues caucasiennes du nord-ouest (in French). Paris: Adrien-Maisonneuve.
- —— (1933). Introduction à la grammaire comparée des langues caucasiennes du nord (in French). Paris: Champion.
- —— (1933). Recherches comparatives sur le verbe caucasien (in French). Paris: Champion.
- —— (1934). Ouranos-Varuna: Etude de mythologie comparée indo-européenne (in French). Paris: Adrien-Maisonneuve.
- ——; Charmet, Raymond (1935). Flamen-Brahman. Annales du Musée Guimet, Bibliothèque de vulgarisation (in French). Vol. 51. Paris: Geuthner.
- —— (1937). Contes lazes. Travaux et mémoires de l'Institut d'ethnologie (in French). Vol. 27. Paris: Institut d'ethnologie.
- —— (1939). Mythes et dieux des Germains: Essai d'interpretation comparative (in French). Paris: Leroux.
- —— (1941). Jupiter, Mars, Quirinus: Essai sur la conception indo-européenne de la société et sur les origines de Rome (in French). Paris: Gallimard.
- —— (1942). Horace et les Curiaces (in French). Paris: Gallimard.
- —— (1943). Servius et la fortune (in French). Paris: Gallimard.
- —— (1944). Naissance de Rome: Jupiter, Mars, Quirinus II (in French). Paris: Gallimard.
- —— (1945). Naissance d'archanges, Jupiter, Mars, Quirinus III: Essai sur la formation de la théologie zoroastrienne (in French). Paris: Gallimard.
- —— (1947). Tarpeia (in French). Paris: Gallimard.
- —— (1948). Loki (in French). Paris: G. P. Maisonneuve.
- —— (1948). Mitra-Varuna: Essai sur deux representations indo-européennes de la souveraineté (in French). Paris: Gallimard.
- —— (1949). L'héritage indo-européen a Rome (in French). Paris: Gallimard.
- —— (1949). Le Troisième Souverain: Essai sur le dieu indo-iranien Aryaman et sur la formation de l'histoire mythique d'Irlande (in French). G. P. Maisonneuve.
- —— (1952). Les dieux Indo-Européens (in French). Paris: Presses Universitaires de France.
- —— (1954). Rituels indo-européens à Rome (in French). Paris: Klincksieck.
- —— (1956). Aspects de la fonction guerrière chez les Indo-Européens (in French). Paris: Presses Universitaires de France.
- —— (1956). Déesses latines et mythes védiques (in French). Brussels: Collection Latomus.
- ——, ed. (1957). Contes et legendes des Oubykhs (in French). Translated by Dumézil, Georges. Paris: Institut d'ethnologie.
- —— (1958). L'ideélogie tripartie des Indo-Européens (in French). Collection Latomus.
- —— (1959). Etudes oubykhs (in French). A. Maisonneuve.
- —— (1959). Les dieux des Germains: Essai sur la formation de la religion scandinave (in French). Paris: Presses Universitaires de France. translation published in Mythe et épopée, three volumes, Gallimard (Paris), 1968–73.
- —— (1960). Documents anatoliens sur les langues et les traditions du Caucase (in French). A. Maisonneuve.
- —— (1964). Notes sur le parler d'un Armenien musulman de Hemsin (in French). Brussels: Palais des Academies.
- ——, ed. (1965). Le livre des héros (in French). Translated by Dumézil, Georges. Paris: Gallimard.
- —— (1966). La religion romaine archaïque (in French). Paris: Payot.
- —— (1970). Archaic Roman Religion. Translated by Krapp, Philip. Chicago: University of Chicago Press. — translation of La religion romaine archaïque
- —— (1970). The Destiny of the Warrior. Translated by Hiltebeitel, Alf. Chicago: University of Chicago Press.
- —— (1970). Du mythe au roman: La saga de Hadingus (in French). Paris: Press universitaires de France.
- —— (1970). Heur et malheur de guerrier (in French) (2nd ed.). Paris: Presses Universitaires de France.
- —— (1973). From Myth to Fiction: The Saga of Hadingus. Translated by Coltman, Derek. Chicago: University of Chicago Press. — translation of Du myth au roman: La saga de Hadingus
- —— (1973). Gods of the Ancient Northmen. Berkeley: University of California Press.
- —— (1974). The Destiny of a King. Translated by Hiltebeitel, Alf. Chicago: University of Chicago Press.
- —— (1975). Fêtes romaines d'été et d'automne suivies de Dix questions romaines (in French). Paris: Gallimard.
- —— (1977). Les dieux souverains des indo-européens (in French). Paris: Gallimard.
- —— (1978). Romans de Scythie et d'alentour (in French). Paris: Payot.
- —— (1979). Discours (in French). Paris: Institut de France.
- —— (1979). Mariages indo-européens, suivi de Quinze questions romaines (in French). Paris: Payot.
- —— (1980). Camillus: A Study of Indo-European Religion as Roman History. Translated by Aronowicz, Annette; Bryson, Josette. Berkeley: University of California Press.
- —— (1981). Pour un Temps (in French). Paris: Pandora Editions.
- —— (1983). La courtisane et les seigneurs colorés, et autres essais (in French). Paris: Gallimard.
- —— (1983). The Stakes of the Warrior. Berkeley: University of California Press.
- —— (1986). L'Oubli de l'homme et l'honneur des dieux (in French). Paris: Gallimard.
- —— (1986). The Plight of a Sorceror. Berkeley: University of California Press.
- —— (1987). Apollon sonore et autres essais: vingt-cinq esquisses de mythologie (in French). Paris: Gallimard.
- —— (1987). Entretiens avec Didier Eribon (in French). Paris: Gallimard.
- —— (1988). Mitra-Varuna: An Essay on Two Indo-European Representations of Sovereignty. Translated by Coltman, Derek. New York: Zone Books. ISBN 978-0-942299-12-0. — translation of Mitra-Varuna: Essai sur deux representations indo-européennes de la souveraineté, 2nd edition; revised and critical edition, ed. Stuart Elden, Chicago: Hau, 2023
- —— (1994). Le Roman des jumeaux et autres essais: vingt-cinq esquisses de mythologie (in French). Paris: Gallimard.
- —— (1996). Archaic Roman Religion: With an Appendix on the Religion of the Etruscans. Baltimore, MD: Johns Hopkins University Press. LCCN 96014884.
- —— (1999). The Riddle of Nostradamus: A Critical Dialogue. Translated by Wing, Betsy. Baltimore: Johns Hopkins University Press. ISBN 978-0-8018-6128-4.

== See also ==
- Hector Munro Chadwick
- John Colarusso
- Dennis Howard Green
- Winfred P. Lehmann
- J. P. Mallory
- Franz Rolf Schröder
- Calvert Watkins
- Martin Litchfield West

== Sources ==
- Académie Française. "Prix Georges Dumézil". academie-francaise.fr (in French).
- Arvidsson, Stefan (June 1999). "Aryan Mythology As Science and Ideology". Journal of the American Academy of Religion. 67 (2). Oxford University Press: 327–354. doi:10.1093/jaarel/67.2.327. JSTOR 1465740.
- Arvidsson, Stefan (2006). Aryan Idols: Indo-European Mythology as Ideology and Science. University of Chicago Press. ISBN 0226028607.
- Carlson, Maria (2008). "A Detailed Look at Stefan Arvidsson's Aryan Idols". Slavic Cultural Studies. University of Kansas.
- Dumézil, Georges (1985). "Science et politique. Réponse à Carlo Ginzburg". Annales. Histoire, Sciences Sociales (in French). 40 (5). School for Advanced Studies in the Social Sciences: 985–989. doi:10.3406/ahess.1985.283216. JSTOR 27583135. S2CID 162317036.
- Dumézil, Georges; Eribon, Didier (1987). Entretiens avec Didier Eribon (in French). Gallimard. ISBN 2070323986.
- Dumézil, Georges (2006). "Une idylle de vingt ans (A. Momigliano, OPVS, II, 2 pp. 329–341)". L'oubli de l'homme et l'honneur des dieux et autres essais (in French). Gallimard. ISBN 2070703169.
- Eribon, Didier (1992). Faut-il brûler Dumézil? (in French). Flammarion. ISBN 2080667092.
- Ginzburg, Carlo (1989). "Germanic Mythology and Nazism: Thoughts on an Old Book by Georges Dumézil". Clues, Myths, and the Historical Method. Johns Hopkins University Press. pp. 114–131. ISBN 1-4214-0991-7.
- Lincoln, Bruce (1991). "Shaping the Past and the Future". Death, War, and Sacrifice: Studies in Ideology & Practice. University of Chicago Press. pp. 231–243. ISBN 0-226-48199-9.
- Lincoln, Bruce (1999). Theorizing Myth: Narrative, Ideology, and Scholarship. University of Chicago Press. ISBN 0226482022.
- Lincoln, Bruce (15 March 2010). "DUMÉZIL, Georges". Encyclopædia Iranica.
- Littleton, C. Scott (2005). "DUMÈZIL, GEORGES". In Jones, Lindsay (ed.). Encyclopedia of Religion. Vol. 4 (2 ed.). Macmillan Reference USA. pp. 2518–2520. ISBN 0-02-865737-3.
- Littleton, C. Scott (1999). "Gods, Myths And Structures: Dumézil". In Glendinning, Simon (ed.). The Edinburgh Encyclopedia of Continental Philosophy. Psychology Press. pp. 558–568. ISBN 1579581528.
- Miller, Dean A. (2000). "Georges Dumézil: Theories, Critiques and Theoretical Extensions". Religion. 30. Routledge: 27–40. doi:10.1006/reli.1999.0239. S2CID 171034204.
- Momigliano, Arnoldo (October 1984). "Georges Dumézil and the Trifunctional Approach to Roman Civilization". History and Theory. 23 (3). Wiley-Blackwell: 312–330. doi:10.2307/2505078. JSTOR 2505078.
- Momigliano, Arnoldo (1994). "Introduction to a Discussion to Georges Dumézil". Studies on Modern Scholarship. University of California Press. pp. 286–301. ISBN 0-520-07001-1.
- Polomé, Edgar C. (1999). "About Dumézil". Journal of Indo-European Studies. 27 (1): 248–251. ProQuest 206808390.
- Scott, Paula Pyzik (5 November 2003). "Georges (Edmond Raoul) Dumezil". Contemporary Authors. Gale.
- "M George Dumézil". The Times. 16 October 1986. p. 22 – via Gale.
