= Udo Strutynski =

American linguist

- Born: September 21, 1942; Vienna, Austria

Academic background
- Education: University of California, Los Angeles
- Academic advisor: C. Scott Littleton
- Influences: Georges Dumézil

Academic work
- Discipline: Linguistics
- Sub-discipline: Germanic studies; Indo-European studies
- Main interests: Germanic mythology; Indo-European mythology

Udo Mario Strutynski (born September 21, 1942) is an Austrian-born American linguist and lawyer. As a linguist, Strutynski specializes in Indo-European and Germanic studies, particularly the study of Germanic and Indo-European mythology. As a lawyer he has distinguished himself to helping out victims of the sexual abuse scandal in the Catholic archdiocese of Los Angeles, of which he is himself a survivor.

== Biography ==
Udo Strutynski was born in Vienna, Austria on 21 September 1942. Together with his mother, Strutynski came to Los Angeles as a refugee in 1950. His mother was a devout Roman Catholic. Having graduated at the head of his class at Loyola High School, Strutynski received his A.B. from Loyola Marymount University in 1963, his M.A. from the University of California, Los Angeles (UCLA) in 1966, and his Ph.D. in Germanic languages from UCLA in 1975. He subsequently served as Assosicate Editor at University of California Press (1975-1978), Assistant Professor of Anthropology at Occidental College (1979-1980) and Assistant Professor of Comparative Literature and Germanic at Northwestern University (1980-?). He became a member of the Modern Language Association.

Strutynski specializes in the study Germanic and Indo-European mythology, epic poetry, and Germanic and European folklore. He has authored a number of influential studies on those subjects. His research is strongly influenced by that of Georges Dumézil.

Strutynski gained a J.D. from UCLA in 1992, and was admitted to the State Bar of California on August 4, 1993. He subsequently became a partner at the firm of Chan & Strutynski, and notably provided legal counseling for Chinese clients in California. While a high school student, Strutynski was sexually abused by Father Thomas J. Sullivan, and Strutynski has dedicated himself towards helping other victims of the sexual abuse scandal in the Catholic archdiocese of Los Angeles. Strutynski was a plaintiff in a suit against the Roman Catholic Archdiocese of Los Angeles, in which more than 500 victims reached a $660 million settlement.

== Selected works ==
- The Three Functions of Indo-European Tradition in the "Eumenides" of Aeschylus, 1970
- (Contributor) Myth and Law among the Indo-Europeans, 1970
- (Contributor) Gods of the Ancient Northmen , 1973
- (Contributor) Myth in Indo-European Antiquity , 1974
- "Germanic Divinities in Weekday Names", 1975
- "Philippson Contra Dumezil: An Answer to the Attack", 1977
- (Editor) Camillus: A Study of Indo-European Religion as Roman History , 1980
- "Ares: A Reflex of the Indo-European War God?", 1980
- (Contributor) Georges Dumézil, 1981
- Honi Soit Qui Mal Y Pense: The Warrior Sins of Sir Gawain, 1982
- (Contributor) Homage to Georges Dumézil, 1983
- "The Survival of Indo-European Mythology in Germanic Legendry", 1984
- (With Gunar Freibergs and C. Scott Littleton) "Indo-European Tripartition and the Ara Pacis Augustae: An Excursus in Ideological Archaeology", 1986

== See also ==
- Edgar C. Polomé
- Dean A. Miller
- Calvert Watkins
- Martin Litchfield West
- Donald J. Ward
- Jaan Puhvel
