= Dean A. Miller =

American folklorist (1931–2018)

- Born: July 31, 1931; Chicago, Illinois
- Died: January 28, 2018 (aged 86); Chicago, Illinois

Academic background
- Education: Northwestern University; Columbia University; Rutgers University

Academic work
- Discipline: History
- Institutions: Saint Peter’s College; University of Rochester
- Main interests: Heroic poetry
- Notable works: The Epic Hero (2000)

Dean Arthur Miller (July 29, 1931 - January 28, 2018) was an American historian who was Professor of History at the University of Rochester. He specialized in the classics, Celtic studies and Indo-European studies, with a particular focus on Heroic poetry.

== Biography ==
Miller was born in Chicago on July 29, 1931, the son of Donald Braud Miller and Bessie Garrison. He graduated from Rock Island High School in 1949. From 1955 to 1958 he served in the Counterintelligence Corps of the United States Army at Fort Meade, Maryland. He received his Bachelor's degree in history from Northwestern University in 1953, his Master's degree in Byzantine history from Columbia University in 1958, and his PhD in history from Rutgers University in 1963. His dissertation was on Byzantine diplomacy.

After serving as an assistant professor at Saint Peter's College, Miller was appointed an associate professor at University of Rochester in 1963. Books published by Miller during this time include The Byzantine Tradition (1966) and Imperial Constantinople (1969). Within seven years at Rochester he was appointed a full professor of history there, and also held a secondary appointment in religion and classics. Miller researched a diverse set of subjects, including the Byzantine Empire, Ancient Sparta, Greek mythology and Indo-European studies. He was proficient in a large number of languages, including Latin, Ancient Greek, French, German, and Russian, Old Church Slavonic and Bulgarian. Miller was an adherent of Georges Dumézil's research on Indo-European religion, and published several papers on the relevance of Dumézil's work.

Miller retired from the University of Rochester in 1993, but continued to research, write and attend academic conferences. He was a mythology editor for the Journal of Indo-European Studies. His magnum opus, The Epic Hero, was published in 2000. It was the result of 20 years of scholarship, drew on interdisciplinary research spanning the fields of classics, anthropology, psychology, philology, and spanned all the Western epic traditions, including Greek, Roman, Nordic and Celtic, in addition to Indian and Persian. The Epic Hero was selected as an Outstanding Academic Title by Choice.

Married three times. He married his first wife, Elizabeth Walter, on January 16, 1955, with whom he had the sons Douglas and Kenneth. He married his second wife, Mona Schekter, on January 24, 1966, with whom he had the sons Scott and Eric. He subsequently married Marta Swift, who died in 2017. Miller was a member of the Democratic Party.

Miller died at his home in Chicago on January 28, 2018. He was survived by his four sons.

== Selected works ==
- The Byzantine Tradition, 1966
- Imperial Constantinople, 1969
- The Tie That Blinds: The UN/Vatican Connection, 1999
- The Epic Hero, 2000

== See also ==
- C. Scott Littleton
- Hector Munro Chadwick
- Jaan Puhvel
- Calvert Watkins
- Mircea Eliade
- Martin Litchfield West
- Donald J. Ward
- Nicholas Allen

== Sources ==
- Knispel, Sandra (April 3, 2019). "Colleagues remember history professor emeritus Dean A. Miller". University of Rochester.
- "D(ean) A(rthur) Miller". Contemporary Authors. Gale. December 12, 2001.
