= Trifunctional hypothesis =

Hypothesis about Proto-Indo-European society

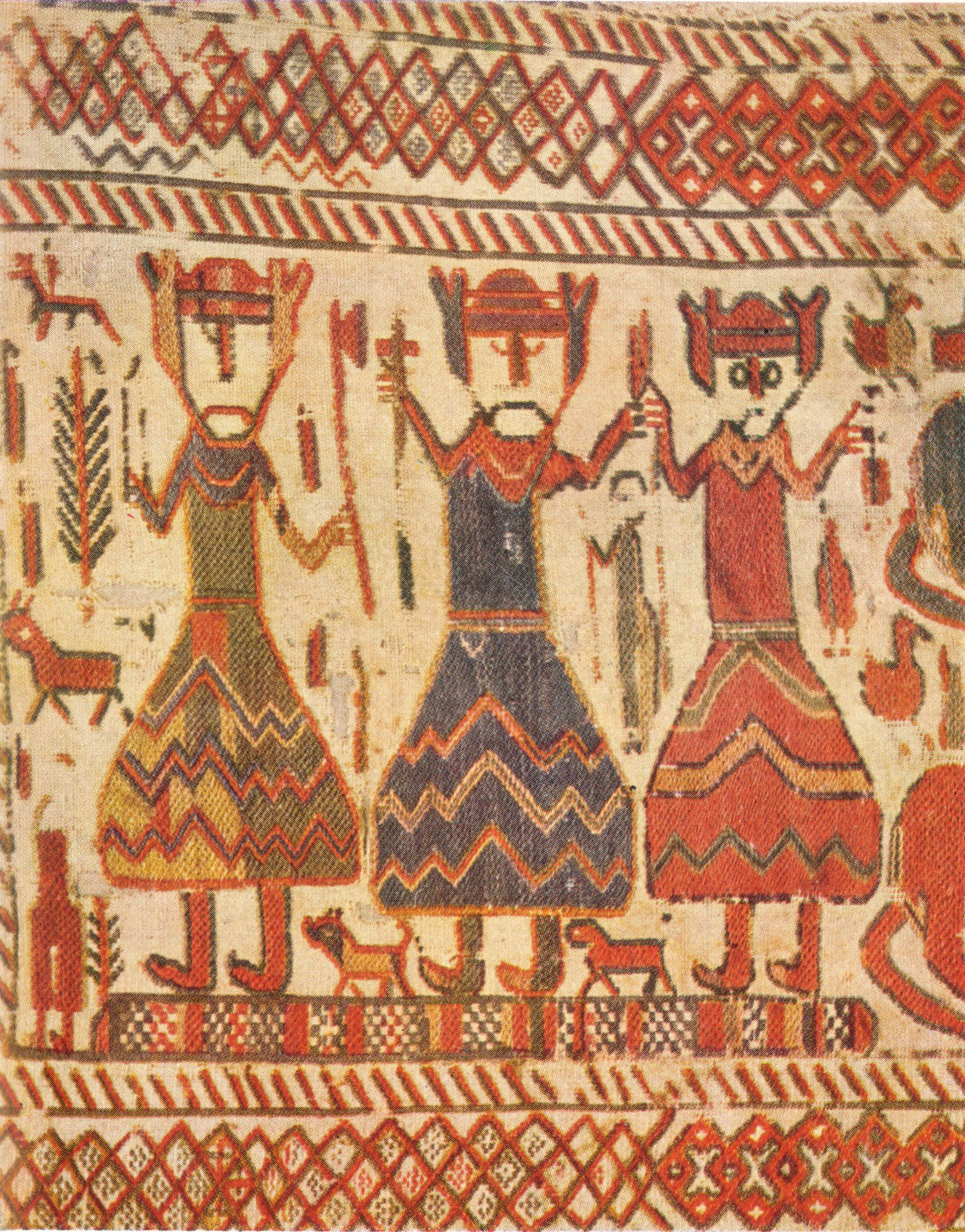
This part of the 12th-century Swedish Skog tapestry has, possibly erroneously, been interpreted to show, from left to right, the one-eyed Odin, the hammer-wielding Thor and Freyr holding up wheat. Terje Leiren believes this grouping corresponds closely to the trifunctional division.

The trifunctional hypothesis is a theory that prehistoric Proto-Indo-European society and religion reflected a tripartite ideology ("idéologie tripartite") organized around three functions: the sacral, or sovereign, the martial, and the productive, or economic. These functions were sometimes associated with three social classes or castes: priests, warriors, and commoners (farmers, herders, craftspeople or tradesmen). The trifunctional thesis is primarily associated with the French comparative mythologist Georges Dumézil, who developed the hypothesis across studies of Roman, Indo-Iranian, Germanic and epic traditions, notably in Flamen-Brahman and Mitra-Varuna. In Dumézil's later formulation, the hypothesis concerned a religious and ideological structure rather than a direct reconstruction of three original social segments.

== Three-way division ==
According to Georges Dumézil (1898–1986), Proto-Indo-European society and religion could be interpreted through three main functions, sometimes corresponding to three main groups:

- Sovereignty, which fell into two distinct and complementary sub-parts:
  - one formal, juridical and priestly but worldly;
  - the other powerful, unpredictable and priestly but rooted in the supernatural world.
- Military, connected with force, the military and war.
- Productivity, fertility, prosperity, herding, farming, food, wealth and crafts; ruled by the other two.

Dumézil initially related the three functions to social organization, but later described them chiefly as an ideological pattern. The pattern could be expressed in social classes, ritual institutions, groups of gods, myths, heroic narratives and legendary history. In the Proto-Indo-European mythology as reconstructed by Dumézil and later scholars, a function could be represented by its own god or family of gods, and the function of the god or gods matched the function of the group. Many such divisions occur in the history of Indo-European societies:

- Southern Russia: Bernard Sergent associates the Indo-European language family with certain archaeological cultures in Southern Russia and reconstructs an Indo-European religion based upon the tripartite functions.
- Early Baltic society: Norbertas Vėlius, in his book Senovės baltų pasaulėžiūra (The Ancient Baltic Worldview), identified three regions with three classes. The priestly class was centered in Prussia, the warrior class was prominent in the outer highlands, and the farming class predominated in the intermediate flatlands.
- Early Germanic society: Dumézil identified a division between the king, warrior aristocracy and regular freemen.
- Norse mythology: Odin (sovereignty), Týr (law and justice), the Vanir (fertility). (Note: Terje Leiren discerns another grouping of three Norse gods that may correspond to the trifunctional division: Odin as the patron of priests and magicians, Thor of warriors, and Freyr of fertility and farming.) Odin has been interpreted as a death-god and connected to cremations, and has also been associated with ecstatic practices.
- Roman religion: Dumézil interpreted the archaic triad of Jupiter, Mars and Quirinus as a Roman expression of the three functions, with Jupiter representing sovereignty, Mars war, and Quirinus the third function of productivity and civic fertility.
- Classical Greece: the three divisions of the ideal society as described by Socrates in Plato's The Republic. Bernard Sergent examined the trifunctional hypothesis in Greek epic, lyric and dramatic poetry, while also arguing that the three functions were less clearly organized in Greek religion than in some other Indo-European traditions.
- India: the three higher Hindu varnas, the Brahmins or priests, the Kshatriyas, the warriors and military, and the Vaishyas, the agriculturalists, cattle rearers and traders. The Shudra is a fourth varna. Dumézil and other scholars also compared Indo-Iranian divine pairs and groups, such as Mitra and Varuna, with the first function of sovereignty.

=== War of the functions ===
Dumézil and later scholars also identified a recurring mythic pattern sometimes called the "war of the functions", "interfunctional war", "war of foundation" or "war between the functions". In this interpretation, a foundational conflict opposes representatives of the first two functions, sovereignty and warfare, to representatives of the third function, associated with fertility, wealth, women, food, prosperity or productive abundance. The conflict ends not by eliminating the third function, but by incorporating it into the victorious group. The resulting society or pantheon becomes complete only after the three functions have been joined.

The Roman legend of the Rape of the Sabine women has been treated as a central example in this interpretation. In this reading, the early Romans represent the first and second functions, while the Sabines represent the third function through wealth, fecundity and marriage. The abduction of the Sabine women leads to war between Romans and Sabines, but the conflict is resolved when the women intervene and the two peoples are united under a shared political order. Other scholars have explained the Sabine legend as a projection of later Sabine incursions and incorporation into the Roman state, or as reflecting a significant Sabine element in Rome's earliest population.

A similar pattern has been identified in the Æsir and Vanir conflict in Norse mythology. The Æsir, associated with gods such as Odin, Týr and Thor, have been interpreted as representing sovereignty and warrior force. The Vanir, especially Njörðr, Freyr and Freyja, are associated with fertility, wealth, sexuality and prosperity. Their war ends with an exchange of hostages and the incorporation of Vanir gods into the Æsir pantheon.

C. Scott Littleton extended the comparison to the Iliad, arguing that the Trojan War could be examined in light of the same interfunctional pattern. In this interpretation, the Greek side is associated especially with royal and warrior functions, while Troy is associated with wealth, luxury and the third function. Littleton presented the Homeric comparison as a possible Indo-European theme. The fate of Trojan women has been compared with the incorporation of Sabine women into Rome.

== Reception ==
Supporters of the hypothesis include scholars such as Émile Benveniste, Bernard Sergent and Iaroslav Lebedynsky, the last of whom concludes that "the basic idea seems proven in a convincing way". Benveniste initially criticized aspects of Dumézil's comparative method, but later supported the tripartite model and developed related arguments from Indo-European institutional vocabulary. C. Scott Littleton helped develop and disseminate Dumézilian comparison in Indo-European studies and comparative mythology.

The hypothesis was embraced outside the field of Indo-European studies by some mythographers, anthropologists and historians such as Mircea Eliade, Claude Lévi-Strauss, Marshall Sahlins, Rodney Needham, Jean-Pierre Vernant and Georges Duby. Duby used the model in his analysis of the medieval estates of the realm, especially the division between those who pray, those who fight and those who work. Jacques Le Goff argued that in medieval studies the significance of the model lay less in proving Indo-European origins than in explaining how a social ideology worked and whose interests it served.

Some scholars have sought to modify rather than reject Dumézil's model. Although critical of strict tripartition, Nicholas Allen has suggested that Dumézil's three functions may form part of a broader classificatory system, and argued that reconstructions of Indo-European myth and poetry that rely less on Dumézil's system can understate the importance of ordered groupings of gods, heroes and social roles. André Sauzeau and Pierre Sauzeau have argued for a fourth function associated with disorder, marginality, ambiguity and transformation.

Other scholars have questioned the scope, coherence or historical application of the hypothesis. Benjamin W. Fortson reports a view that Dumézil blurred the lines between the three functions and that some examples had contradictory characteristics. Jan Gonda also raised methodological objections to Dumézil's use of Indo-Iranian evidence. John Brough argued that comparable social divisions occur outside Indo-European societies, limiting the hypothesis's value for reconstructing prehistoric Indo-European society. Cristiano Grottanelli stated that while Dumézilian trifunctionalism may be visible in modern and medieval contexts, its projection onto earlier cultures is mistaken. Wouter W. Belier criticized the origin and development of Dumézil's tripartite ideology. Arnaldo Momigliano argued in particular that Dumézil's approach had not shown how alleged Indo-European survivals related to the wider body of Roman beliefs, rituals and institutions.

The hypothesis and Dumézil's scholarship have also been discussed in relation to his political background and the politics of Indo-European studies. Historians including Carlo Ginzburg, Arnaldo Momigliano and Bruce Lincoln connected Dumézil's work with his sympathies for the political right or with the possible projection of modern hierarchical ideology onto ancient materials. Guy Stroumsa discussed the resulting controversy and treated it as significant for the study of mythology, religion and modern politics.

The trifunctional hypothesis continues to be discussed in comparative mythology and Indo-European studies. Some modern comparativists, such as M. L. West, have reconstructed Indo-European myth and poetry with less reliance on Dumézil's system.

== See also ==
- Arthashastra
- Comparative mythology
- Estates of the realm
- Four occupations
- Mythography
- Proto-Indo-European religion
- Proto-Indo-European society
- Sphere sovereignty

== Sources ==
- Davidson, Hilda Ellis (1990), Gods and Myths of Northern Europe, Penguin Books, ISBN 0-14-013627-4
- de Vries, Jan (1970), Altgermanische Religionsgeschichte, volume 2. 2nd ed. repr. as 3rd ed (in German), Walter de Gruyter, OCLC 466619179
- Polomé, Edgar Charles (1970), "The Indo-European Component in Germanic Religion", in Puhvel, Jaan (ed.), Myth and Law Among the Indo-Europeans: Studies in Indo-European Comparative Mythology, University of California, ISBN 9780520015876
- Turville-Petre, Gabriel (1964), Myth and Religion of the North: The Religion of Ancient Scandinavia, Weidenfeld and Nicolson, OCLC 645398380
