= Puhvel =

Family name

Puhvel is a surname of Estonian origin. Notable people with the surname include:

- Jaan Puhvel (1932–2026), Estonian-American Indo-Europeanist and mythographer
- Martin Puhvel (1933–2016), Estonian-Canadian philologist
