= Donald J. Ward =

American folklorist

- Born: March 16, 1930; Petaluma, California, U.S.
- Died: September 16, 2004 (aged 74); Sherman Oaks, Los Angeles, California, U.S.
- Children: 2, including Jim

Academic background
- Education: San Francisco State University; University of California, Los Angeles
- Academic advisor: Wayland Hand
- Influences: Jaan Puhvel

Academic work
- Discipline: Philology
- Sub-discipline: Folklore studies
- Institutions: University of California, Los Angeles
- Main interests: Germanic mythology and folklore; Indo-European mythology
- Notable works: The Divine Twins: An Indo-European Myth in Germanic Tradition (1968)

Donald J. Ward (March 16, 1930 – September 16, 2004) was an American folklorist who was Professor of German and Folklore and Director of Center for the Study of Comparative Folklore and Mythology at University of California, Los Angeles. He specialized in the study of Germanic and Indo-European mythology.

== Biography ==
Donald J. Ward was born on March 16, 1930, in Petaluma, California, the son of James E. Ward (an estimator) and Henriette Gink. He attended high school and junior college in Santa Rosa, California. He served as a cryptographer in Germany for the United States Air Force from 1950 to 1954, reaching the rank of staff sergeant. During this time, he developed an interest in German culture. After his discharge, he remained in Germany for two years to study at the University of Mainz. He received in A.B. from San Francisco State University in 1959, and his M.A. (1961) and PhD (1965) in Germanic Linguistics from the University of California, Los Angeles (UCLA). His PhD was supervised by the celebrated folklorist Wayland Hand.

From 1965 to 1974, Ward was Associate Professor of German and Folklore at the UCLA. From 1969 to 1971, he was Associate Director of University of California Study Center at the University of Göttingen, Germany. He was a Fellow of the Alexander von Humboldt Foundation at the University of Freiburg from 1971 to 1972. Since 1974, Ward was Professor of German and Folklore at the UCLA. From 1974 to 1978, he was also Director of Center for the Study of Comparative Folklore and Mythology. From 1985 to 1986, he held a Fulbright Research Scholarship at the University of Freiburg. At the UCLA, Ward supervised more than 20 PhDs. Ward retired from UCLA as Professor Emeritus in 1991, but continued to teach and research. In 1991, he held several visiting appointments at the University of Innsbruck, Austria.

Ward specialized in the study of Indo-European mythology, Old High German and Middle High German literature, and particularly Germanic folklore. Ward's book The Divine Twins: An Indo-European Myth in Germanic Tradition (1968) received a Second Place Award of the Chicago Folklore Prize, and his German Legends of the Brothers Grimm (1981), a translation of the works of the Brothers Grimm, was named by Choice as one of the best scholarly books of 1981.

Ward was a member of the American Folklore Society, the International Society for Ethnology and Folklore, the International Society of Folk-Narrative Research, the California Folklore Society and Pacific Coast Philology. He was editor of Encyclopedia of American Popular Belief and Superstitions (1986–), Associate Editor of Abstracts of Folklore Studies (1965–1978) and Fabula (1974–), co-editor (with Joseph F. Nagy) of Western Folklore (1996–2000), Member of the Board of Governors of Maledicta, and the contributor of articles to Handbuch des deutschen Volksliedes, Zeitschrift für deutsche Philologie, Jahrbuch fuer Volksliedforschung, Deutsche Vierteljahrsschrift für Literaturwissenschaft und Geistesgeschichte, Classica et Mediaevalia, The German Quarterly, Journal of American Folklore, Myth and Law Among Indo-Europeans, Encyclopedia of Fairy Tales and numerous other prestigious publications.

Ward married Mary Louise Moore on June 9, 1958, with whom he had two children. His hobbies included painting, theatre and opera. He resided in Sherman Oaks, Los Angeles.

Ward died from Alzheimer's disease on September 16, 2004. He was survived by his wife, his two children, including actor Jim Ward and three grandchildren.

== Selected works ==
- The Divine Twins: An Indo-European Myth in Germanic Tradition, 1968

== See also ==
- C. Scott Littleton
- Dean A. Miller
- Edgar C. Polomé
- Martin Litchfield West

== Sources ==
- Wagener, Hans (2004). "Donald J. Ward". University of California, Los Angeles.
- Wagener, Hans (2010). "A Brief Biography of Donald J. Ward". Western Folklore. 69 (1). Western States Folklore Society: 15–18. JSTOR 25735281. ProQuest 762374109.
- "Ward, Donald J." Los Angeles Times. September 22, 2004. p. 24.
- "Donald Ward". Contemporary Authors. Gale. June 12, 2002.
