= Archaic Roman Religion =

Archaic Roman religion may refer to:

- Archaic Roman Religion (La Religion romaine archaïque in French), a 1966 book by philologist Georges Dumézil
- The religion in ancient Rome
