= Elard Hugo Meyer =

German philologist

- Born: 6 October 1837; Bremen, Germany
- Died: 11 February 1908 (aged 70); Freiburg, Germany

Academic background
- Education: University of Berlin
- Influences: Jacob Grimm

Academic work
- Discipline: Germanic studies; Indo-European studies
- Institutions: University of Freiburg
- Main interests: German folklore; Germanic mythology; Indo-European mythology
- Notable works: Indogermanische Mythen (1883-1897)

Elard Hugo Meyer (6 October 1837 – 11 February 1908) was a German philologist who specialized in Germanic and Indo-European studies.

== Biography ==
Elard Hugo Meyer was born in Bremen, Germany on 6 October 1837. His father was a lawyer who served as the city librarian in Bremen. Gaining his earliest education in Bremen, Meyer studied philology at the universities of Bonn, Tübingen and Berlin.

From 1860 to 1862, Meyer worked as a research assistant for the historian Johann Martin Lappenberg. Since 1863 he worked as a teacher in Bremen, while publishing essays on a variety of topics, including German and French poetry, the history of Bremen, and life and works of Johann Smidt. From 1875 to 1878, Meyer edited the fourth edition of Jacob Grimm's Deutsche Mythologie.

Meyer fell ill in 1882, and subsequently retired as a teacher and moved to Freiburg. He subsequently published his Indogermanische Mythen (1883–1897), which examined Indo-European mythology. Since 1889, Meyer lectured at the University of Freiburg, and was subsequently appointed Honorary Professor of Folklore there. In this capacity he lectured on Germanic mythology. Since 1898, Meyer published the journal Deutsche Volkskunde.

Meyer died in Freiburg on 11 February 1908.

== Selected works ==
- Indogermanische Mythen. 2 Bände. Dümmler, Berlin 1883–1987;
  - Band 1: Gandharven – Kentauren.
  - Band 2: Achilleis.
- Germanische Mythologie (= Lehrbücher der germanischen Philologie. Bd. 1). Mayer & Müller, Berlin 1891.
- Deutsche Volkskunde. Karl J. Trübner, Straßburg 1898 (Reprint). Reprint-Verlag Leipzig, Holzminden 1997, ISBN 3-8262-1304-1.
- Badisches Volksleben im neunzehnten Jahrhundert. Karl J. Trübner, Straßburg 1900 (Reprint, ergänzt um ein Ortsregister, eine Auswahlbibliografie zur neueren Brauchforschung und einer Kurzbiografie zu E. H. Meyer. (= Forschungen und Berichte zur Volkskunde in Baden-Württemberg. Bd. 8). Theiss, Stuttgart 1984, ISBN 3-8062-0786-0). Digitalisat der Ausgabe von 1900 im Internet Archive
- Mythologie der Germanen, gemeinfasslich vorgestellt. Karl J. Trübner, Straßburg 1903.

== See also ==
- Max Müller
- Georg Hüsing
- Hermann Güntert
- Franz Rolf Schröder

== Sources ==
- Herbert Schwarzwälder: Das Große Bremen-Lexikon. 2., aktualisierte, überarbeitete und erweiterte Auflage. Edition Temmen, Bremen 2003, ISBN 3-86108-693-X, S. #.
- Patricia Laukó: Die badische Volkskunde, Elard Hugo Meyer und seine Fragebogenaktion
