= Atsuhiko Yoshida =

Japanese classical scholar (born 1934)

- Born: December 22, 1934

Academic background
- Education: Seikei University; University of Tokyo
- Influences: Georges Dumézil

Academic work
- Discipline: Classics
- Main interests: Indo-European mythology; Japanese mythology

Atsuhiko Yoshida (吉田敦彦, born 22 December 1934) is a Japanese classical scholar best known for his research on parallels between Indo-European and Japanese mythology.

== Biography ==
Atsuhiko Yoshida was born on 22 December 1934. He received his degrees in classical studies at Seikei University and the University of Tokyo. Yoshida subsequently researched at the French National Centre for Scientific Research, where he came under the influence of Georges Dumézil. He subsequently worked as a visiting lecturer at the University of Geneva and the University of California, Los Angeles. Returning to Japan, Yoshida became a professor at Seikei University. He subsequently became a professor at Gakushuin University. Yoshida retired as professor emeritus in 2006.

With Taryo Obayashi and C. Scott Littleton, Yoshida has conducted pioneering studies in relations between Indo-European (particularly Greek) and Japanese mythology. He was awarded the Order of the Sacred Treasure in 2013.

== Scholarship ==
Yoshida first came to the attention of the field of comparative mythology with a series of articles published in the 1960s.

In "Survivances de la tripartition fonctionelle en Grèce" (1964), Yoshida discusses the concept of ideological tripartition in early Greek mythological sources, with examples drawn from Homer, Hesiod, and some Mycenaean-era texts. This area of scholarship had been pursued by Yoshida's mentor, Georges Dumézil, who considered it a very difficult field.

The same year, Yoshida published "La structure de l'illustration du bouclier d'Achille" discusses how the elaborate design described by Homer for the shield of Achilles, the topic of which concerns much of Book XVIII of the Iliad, reflects Indo-European ideology. This article also expanded on Dumézil's exploration of tripartite function in Indo-European myth.

In subsequent articles, Yoshida discussed parallels between a series of deaths within a Greek mythological family and another instance from Norse mythology, how the function of cups as symbols of sovereignty in Greek myth corresponds to similar traditions in Celtic and other Indo-European traditions, and the appearance of functional triads in the depiction of Dionysus and in the Iliad.

Separately, Yoshida discussed instances in which Indo-European concepts also appear in some of the earliest surviving Japanese mythology, suggesting that these elements might have been foreign introductions, rather than indigenous traditions that merely resembled those of the west. Yoshida further explored the possible relationship between Japanese and western mythology in "Japanese Mythology and the Indo-European Trifunctional System" (1977), building on Dumézil's earlier research. The transmission of mythological elements from the west to Japan, as well as the incorporation of other east Asian myths within early Japanese tradition, formed the basis of much of Yoshida's Japanese-language scholarship between 1974 and 1993.

== See also ==
- Jaan Puhvel
- Stig Wikander
- Edgar C. Polomé
