= Atsuhiko =

- Pronunciation: At-su-hi-ko
- Gender: Male

Origin
- Origin: Japanese
- Meaning: Different meanings depending on the kanji used

Atsuhiko (written: 篤彦 or 敦彦) is a masculine Japanese given name. Notable people with the name include:

- Atsuhiko Ejiri (江尻 篤彦; born 1967), Japanese footballer
- Atsuhiko Mori (森 敦彦; born 1972), Japanese footballer
- Atsuhiko Yoshida (吉田 敦彦; born 1934), Japanese classical scholar
