= Raimo Aulis Anttila =

Finnish linguist (1935–2023)

- Born: April 21, 1935; Lieto, Finland
- Died: January 27, 2023 (aged 87); Turku, Finland

Academic work
- Discipline: Comparative Linguistics
- Institutions: University of Helsinki; University of California, Los Angeles
- Main interests: Indo-European linguistics

Raimo Aulis Anttila (April 21, 1935 – January 27, 2023) was a Finnish linguist and professor of Indo-European linguistics at the University of California, Los Angeles.

== Biography ==
Raimo Aulis Anttila was born in Finland in 1935. He was a professor of comparative linguistics at the University of Helsinki from 1971 to 1976. He was appointed a professor of Indo-European linguistics at the University of California, Los Angeles (UCLA) in 1976. Anttila was also an authority on Finno-Ugric languages. Along with Marija Gimbutas, Edgar C. Polomé, and Roger Pearson, Anttila was a cofounder of the Journal of Indo-European Studies, and he was a member of its editorial committee in the 1970s. Anttila was elected a corresponding member of the Finnish Academy of Science and Letters in 1995. Anttila retired from UCLA as a professor emeritus.

== Selected works ==
- 1992: "Field Theory of Meaning and Semantic Change." In: G. Kellermann and M. Morrissey, eds., Diachrony within Synchrony: Language History and Cognition, pp. 23–83. (= Duisburger Arbeiten zur Sprach- und Kulturwissenschaft 14). Frankfurt: Peter Lang.
- 1993: "Change and Metatheory at the Beginning of the 1990s: The Primacy of History." In: Charles Jones, ed., Historical Linguistics: Perspectives and Problems, pp. 43–73. London: Longman.
- 1995: "Pattern Explanation and Etymology: Collateral Evidence and Estonian kolle 'hearth', and Related Words." Studi Finno-Ugrici 1: 29–48.
