= Bernard Sergent =

French historian and comparative mythologist (born 1946)

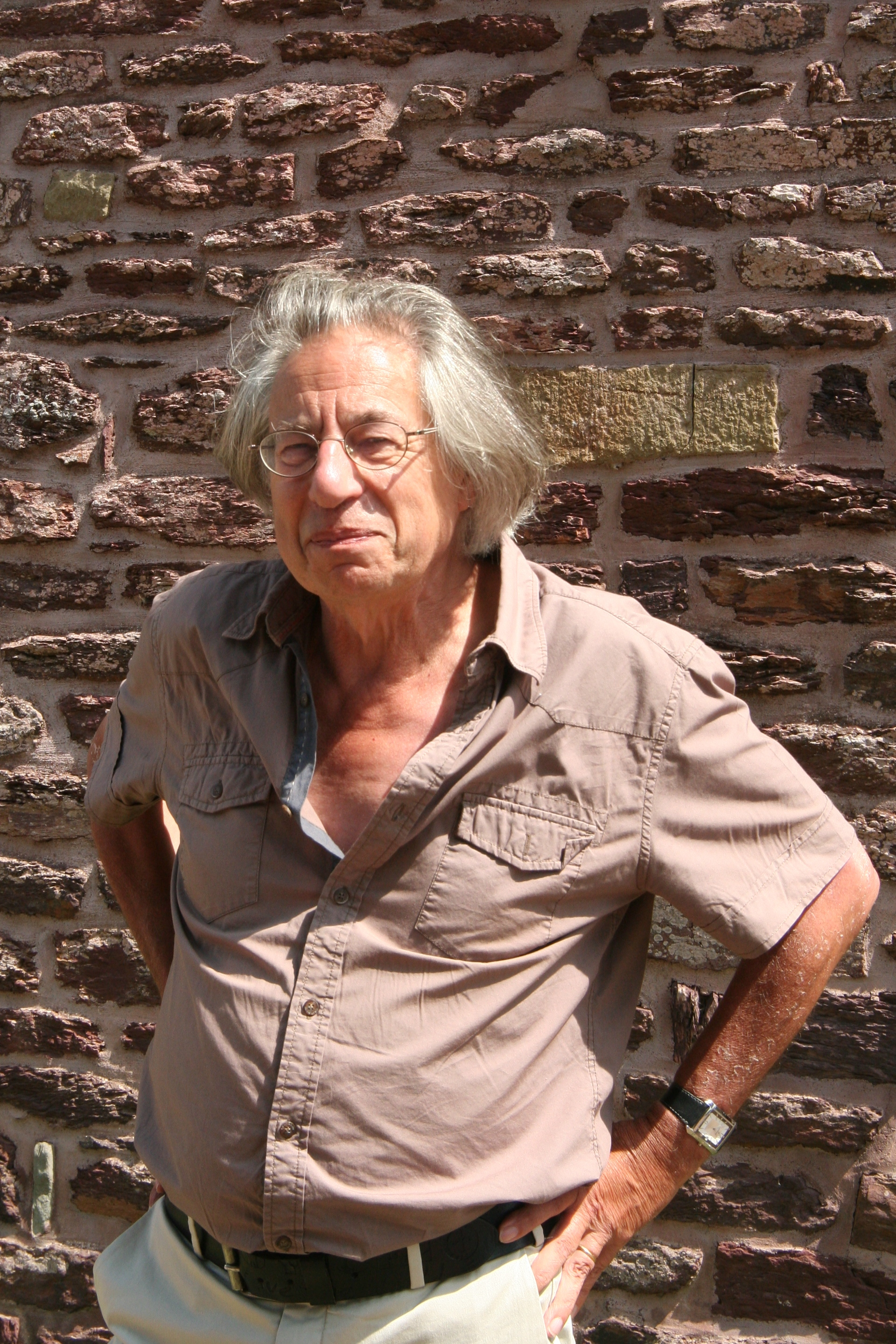
- Sergent in 2014
- Born: 23 February 1946

Academic background
- Education: Paris Nanterre University

Academic work
- Discipline: Ancient history; Comparative mythology
- Main interests: Proto-Indo-European mythology and society

Bernard Sergent (French: [sɛʁʒɑ̃]; born 23 February 1946) is a French ancient historian and comparative mythologist. He is researcher of the CNRS and president of the Société de mythologie française.

== Publications ==
He has written a seminal work on Greek mythology entitled Homosexuality in Greek Myth, translated into English two years later by Beacon Press. In 1986, he followed up with a study covering early homosexuality in Europe, under the title of L'homosexualité initiatique dans l'Europe ancienne (Payot 1986), which has yet to be translated into English. The two studies have been published together, with a postface, as Homosexualité et initiation chez les peuples indo-européens.

In Genèse de L'Inde, he attacks the recent anti-invasionist reconstructions of early Indian history. Instead he defends the traditional hypothesis that the Indo-Aryans came into India in the 2nd millennium BC. According to Sergent, the Dravidian languages originated in Africa before reaching South Asia.

The book Les Indo-Européens - Histoire, langues, mythes is a general introduction to the Indo-European language family. Sergent associates the Indo-European language family with certain archaeological cultures in Southern Russian Steppes or Deshti Kipchak, and he reconstructs an Indo-European religion (relying on the method of Georges Dumézil).

In the monograph, Les trois fonctions indo-européennes en Grèce ancienne, vol. 1: De Mycènes aux Tragique, Sergent examines the employment of the Dumézilian tripartite system in Greek epic, lyric and dramatic poetry. In a second volume, which has not been published yet, he will continue this examination with Greek philosophy and religion.

His recent work, Celtes et Grecs, is dedicated to comparative Greek and Celtic mythology. In volume 1, Le livre de héros (Payot 1999 ISBN 2-228-89257-2), the Irish hero Cuchulainn is compared with the Greek heroes Achilleus, Bellerophon and Melanthius and the Irish epic Táin Bó Cúailnge with the Greek Iliad, which, according to Sergent, presuppose an Indo-European "pre-Iliad". In volume 2, Le livre des dieux, Sergent argues that the Celtic and Greek pantheons derive from a common Indo-European inheritance.

== Works ==
- L'homosexualité initiatique dans l'Europe ancienne, Payot 1986 ISBN 2-228-89052-9
- Les Indo-Européens Payot, 1995 ISBN 2-228-88956-3
- Genèse de l'Inde (Genesis of India), Payot, Paris 1997 ISBN 978-2-228-89116-5
- De Mycènes aux Tragique, Économica 1998 ISBN 2-7178-3587-3
- Celtes et Grecs, Payot, 1999
- La guerre à la culture: aspects des attaques contre l'intelligence dans la période jospino-raffininesque, L'Harmattan, 2005, ISBN 978-2-7475-7823-3
- Les Dragons. Mythes, rites et légendes, 2018, Fouesnant-Embanner, 2018

=== Books with English translations ===
- Homosexuality in Greek Myth, tr. Arthur Goldhammer, pref. Georges Dumezil. Beacon Press, Boston, 1986. ISBN 0-8070-5700-2
- Rommel Mendès-Leite; Pierre-Olivier de Busscher, eds. (1993). "Paedestary and Political Life in Archaic Greek Cities". Gay studies from the French cultures: voices from France, Belgium, Brazil, Canada, and the Netherlands. Routledge. ISBN 978-1-56024-436-3.
