= Stefan Arvidsson =

Swedish historian

- Born: 1968 (age 57–58); Tranås, Sweden

Academic background
- Education: Lund University

Academic work
- Discipline: History
- Sub-discipline: History of religion
- Institutions: Stockholm University; Linnaeus University

Stefan Arvidsson (born 1968) is a Swedish historian who is Professor in the Study of Religions at Linnaeus University. In 2007, he was appointed Associate Professor of the History of Religions at Stockholm University. Since 2012, he has been Professor in the History of Religions at Stockholm University and Professor in the Study of Religions at Linnaeus University.

== Research ==
Arvidsson's PhD thesis examined Indo-European studies, and was published in English under the title Aryan Idols. The Indo-European Mythology as Ideology and Science (2006; 2nd ed. 2025). Arvidsson considers Indo-European studies to be a pseudoscientific field, and has described Indo-European mythology as "the most sinister mythology of modern times". In his works, Arvidsson has sought to expose what he considers to be fascist political sympathies of Indo-Europeanists such as Georges Dumézil. Arvidsson suggests that such an exposure may result in the abolishment ("Ragnarök") of the concept of Indo-European mythology.

Overall his research focuses on the cultural history of modern ideologies. Arvidsson studies ideas from modern-day religions, political movements, and commercial milieus. More specifically, his research falls into three areas of interest. The first area is modern mythology. In Aryan Idols, Arvidsson investigates the most sinister mythology of modern times and its (pseudo-)scientific legitimations. In Draksjukan, he explores how an Old Norse myth was rewritten to fit modern sentiments. Turning from the study of how chiefly nationalist, conservative, and fascist ideologies have influenced modern culture, Arvidsson's second area of interest is the cultural history of socialism—broadly understood to include utopian socialism, social democracy, communism, and anarchism. The Style and Mythology of Socialism was his first major publication in this field. It was followed by the volume Socialist Imaginations: Utopias, Myths, and the Masses (2019), co-edited with Jakub Beneš and Anja Kirsch. Red Faith I and Red Faith II offer an overview of the relationship between various socialist movements and both religious and secular traditions since the French Revolution. Arvidsson’s third area of research concerns the philosophy of science and the nature of the humanities. Religion and Politics under Capitalism attempts to uncover the philosophical and theoretical premises underlying contemporary studies on the relationship between modern religion and mythology, and politics.

== Awards ==
CHOICE 2018 Outstanding Academic Title Award Winner for Socialist style and mythology: socialist idealism, 1871-1914. 2017.

== Selected works ==
- Aryan idols: Indo-European mythology as ideology and science. 2025. New Delhi: Motilal Banarsidass Publishing House. ISBN 978-93-6853-867-7. Previous edition: Aryan idols: Indo-European mythology as ideology and science. 2006. Revised and translated from Swedish by Sonia Wichmann. Chicago: University of Chicago Press. ISBN 0226028607
- Draksjukan: mytiska fantasier hos Tolkien, Wagner och de Vries. 2007. Lund: Nordic Academic Press. ISBN 9789189116931. E-book 2022. ISBN 9789189361560
- Socialist style and mythology: socialist idealism, 1871-1914. 2017. Translated from Swedish by Karen Swartz. Book series: Routledge studies in Modern History. Abingdon, Oxon: Routledge. ISBN 9781138738355
- Socialist imaginations: utopias, myths, and the masses. 2019. Editor with Jakub Beneš and Anja Kirsch. Book series: Routledge studies in modern history. Abingdon, Oxon: Routledge, ISBN 9781138299948
- Religion and politics under capitalism: a humanistic approach to the terminology. 2019. Book series: Routledge studies in Religion. Abingdon, Oxon: Routledge. ISBN 9780367147884
- Secularist, Religious, and Scientific Socialism: Red Faith I. 2025. Translated from Swedish by Rikard Ehnsiö. Book series: Critiques and Alternatives to Capitalism. Abingdon, Oxon: Routledge. ISBN 9781032710853
- Humanist Socialism and the Religion of Socialism: Red Faith II. 2026. Translated from Swedish by Rikard Ehnsiö. Book series: Critiques and Alternatives to Capitalism. Abingdon, Oxon: Routledge. ISBN 9781032710860
