= Hermann Güntert =

German linguist

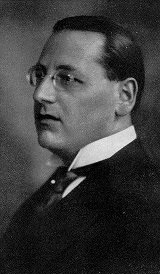
- Born: 5 November 1886; Worms, Germany
- Died: 23 April 1948 (aged 51); Heidelberg, Germany
- Spouse: Gisela Wachenfeld (m. 1923)

Academic background
- Education: Heidelberg University
- Academic advisors: Hermann Osthoff; Christian Bartholomae

Academic work
- Discipline: Linguistics
- Sub-discipline: Germanic linguistics; Indo-European linguistics
- Institutions: University of Rostock; Heidelberg University

Hermann Güntert (5 November 1886 – 23 April 1948) was a German linguist who specialized in Germanic and Indo-European linguistics.

== Biography ==
Hermann Güntert was born in Worms, Germany on 5 November 1886. His father was a Roman Catholic merchant, and his mother was a Huguenot. Güntert became fluent in Sanskrit and Hebrew as a high school student, graduating at the top of his class in 1905.

Güntert subsequently studied classical philology and German philology at the University of Heidelberg. He studied comparative linguistics under Hermann Osthoff, Indo-Iranian languages under Christian Bartholomae, and religious studies under Albrecht Dieterich and Franz Boll. He received his PhD with the dissertation Zur Geschichte der griechischen Gradationsbildungen, which was about the Greek language. It was published in Indogermanische Forschungen in 1909. Güntert subsequently studied for one semester at the University of Leipzig.

In 1909, Güntert passed the staatsexamen in German, Greek and Latin, and subsequently worked as a gymnasium teacher in Heidelberg from 1909 to 1921. He completed his habilitation in 1912/1913 in Indo-European linguistics and classics with the thesis Reimwortbildung im Arischen und Altgriechischen, which examined rhymes in Indo-Iranian and Ancient Greek. He was appointed Associate Professor at the University of Heidelberg in 1918. In 1921, Güntert succeeded Gustav Herbig as Professor of Comparative Linguistics at the University of Rostock. In 1926, he succeeded Bartholomae as Professor at the University of Heidelberg. He was elected Member of the Heidelberg Academy of Sciences and Humanities in 1931. From 1933, Güntert was also a lecturer in Germanic studies. Since 1938, he was the editor of Wörter und Sachen.

Since the spring of 1938, Güntert suffered from declining health, which forced him to reduce his activity at the University. He retired in December 1945, and died in Heidelberg on 23 April 1948.

== Research ==
Güntert's research centered on Indo-Iranian, Ancient Greek and Germanic. He was critical of the North European hypothesis of Gustav Kossinna. Instead he supported the steppe hypothesis of Otto Schrader and Guntërt's Heidelberg colleague Ernst Wahle. In his Der Ursprung der Germanen (1934), Güntert suggested that the Germanic peoples emerged through the conquest of the Funnelbeaker culture by Indo-European invaders of the Corded Ware culture.

Güntert has been referred to as one of the most influential mythographers of his era. His Der arische Weltkönig und Heiland (1923) is widely regarded as the finest work ever published on Indo-European religion. Güntert's research on Indo-European religion has had a strong influence on the later work of Georges Dumézil, Mircea Eliade, Herman Lommel and other scholars.

== Personal life ==
Güntert married Gisela Wachenfeld in 1923.

== See also ==
- Jan de Vries (philologist)
- Edgar C. Polomé
- Otto Höfler
- Rudolf Much
- Georges Dumézil
- Stig Wikander
- Émile Benveniste
- Jaan Puhvel

== Selected works ==
- Zur Geschichte der griechischen Gradationsbildungen, 1909
- Über Reimwortbildungen im Arischen und Altgriechischen, 1914
- Indogermanische Ablautprobleme. Untersuchungen über Schwa secundum, einen zweiten indogermanischen Murmelvokal, 1916
- Kalypso. Bedeutungsgeschichtliche Untersuchungen auf dem Gebiet der indogermanischen Sprachen, 1919
- Von der Sprache der Götter und Geister. Bedeutungsgeschichtliche Untersuchungen zur homerischen und eddischen Göttersprache, 1921
- Der arische Weltkönig und Heiland. Bedeutungsgeschichtliche Untersuchungen zur indo-iranischen Religionsgeschichte und Altertumskunde, 1923
- Grundfragen der Sprachwissenschaft, 1925
- Zur Frage nach der Urheimat der Indogermanen, 1930
- Labyrinth. Eine sprachwissenschaftliche Untersuchung, 1932
- Am Nornenquell (Gedichte), 1933
- Der Ursprung der Germanen, 1934
- Das faustische Wesen des germanischen Menschen, 1934
- Das germanische Erbe in der deutschen Seele, 1934
- Runen, Runenbrauch und Runeninschriften der Germanen, 1934
- Altgermanischer Glaube nach Wesen und Grundlage, 1937
- Geschichte der germanischen Völkerschaften, 1943

== Sources ==
- Wolf H. Goegginger: Hermann Güntert als Religionsforscher. Numen 1967, pp. 150–158.
- Lincoln, Bruce (2008). "Hermann Güntert in the 1930s. Heidelberg, Politics, and the Study of Germanic/Indogermanic Religion". In Junginger, Horst (ed.). The Study of Religion Under the Impact of Fascism. Studies in the History of Religions. Vol. 117. Brill. pp. 179–204. ISBN 978-90-04-16326-3. ISSN 0169-8834.
- Manfred Mayrhofer (ed.): Antiquitates Indogermanicae. Studien zur indogermanischen Altertumskunde und zur Sprach- und Kulturgeschichte der indogermanischen Völker. Gedenkschrift für Hermann Güntert zur 25. Wiederkehr seines Todestages am 23. April 1973, Innsbruck 1974 (pp. 523–528).
