= C. Scott Littleton =

American anthropologist (1933–2010)

- Born: 1 July 1933; Los Angeles, California
- Died: 25 November 2010 (aged 77); Pasadena, California
- Citizenship: USA
- Spouse: Mary Ann Wuest (m. 1961)
- Children: 2

Academic background
- Education: El Camino College; University of California, Los Angeles
- Academic advisor: Jaan Puhvel
- Influences: Georges Dumézil

Academic work
- Discipline: Anthropology
- Institutions: University of California, Los Angeles; Occidental College
- Main interests: Indo-European mythology; King Arthur; Shinto

Covington Scott Littleton (July 1, 1933 – November 25, 2010) was an American anthropologist who was Professor and Chair of the Department of Anthropology at Occidental College. A co-founder of the Journal of Indo-European Studies, Littleton was an expert on Indo-European mythology and Shinto, on which he was the author of numerous works.

== Biography ==
Covington Scott Littleton was born in Los Angeles, California on July 1, 1933, and grew up in Hermosa Beach, California. He was the son of Covington Scott (an investigator and writer) and Adelaide Littleton. Littleton served in the United States Army in Korea during the Korean War, having lied about his age in order to get into the army.

Attending El Camino College from 1952 to 1954, Littleton subsequently studied at the University of California, Los Angeles, where he received his A.B. (with the highest honors) in 1957, M.A. in 1962, and Ph.D. in anthropology in 1965. He was the Graduate Commencement Speaker at University of California, Los Angeles in 1965.

Littleton's 1965 PhD dissertation was published in 1966 under the title The New Comparative Mythology: An Anthropological Assessment of the Theories of Georges Dumézil. He played an important role in disseminating Dumézil's theories Trifunctional hypothesis to an English-speaking audience. Littleton's work on the theories of Dumézil is still considered the most comprehensive source on the subject.

Littleton was a research assistant in folklore center at University of California, Los Angeles from 1961 to 1962. Since 1962, Littleton worked at Occidental College as assistant professor of anthropology (1962–68), Associate Professor of Anthropology (1968–80), Chair of the Department of Sociology and Anthropology (1967–72, 1974–93), and Professor of Anthropology and Chair of the Department of Anthropology (1994–98). He continued to lecture at Occidental until 2002. Littleton was a member of the editorial board of the Journal of Indo-European Studies from its inception, and served as its Mythology Editor since 2000.

Littleton specialized in the study of religion, mythology and folklore, particularly Shinto, King Arthur and Indo-European mythology. He was the author of numerous works on these subjects. He also authored a personal memoir and a science fiction novel. Altogether, Littleton authored hundreds of articles, reviews, monographs and other publications throughout his career.

Littleton was the member of a large number of scholarly organizations. He was a Fulbright Scholar and a member of Phi Beta Kappa.

Littleton died of pneumonia after complications from heart surgery at Pasadena, California on November 25, 2010.

== Personal life ==
Littleton married Mary Ann Wuest on 26 August 1961, with whom he had two daughters, Leslie and Cynthia. He was a member of the Democratic Party and an avid runner, cycler, swimmer, photographer, and reader of science fiction.

== Selected works ==
- Littleton, C. Scott (1973). The New Comparative Mythology: An Anthropological Assessment of the Theories of Georges Dumézil. University of California Press. ISBN 978-0-520-02404-5.
- Littleton, C. Scott; Malcor, Linda A. (1993). From Scythia to Camelot: A Radical Reassessment of the Legends of King Arthur, the Knights of the Round Table, and the Holy Grail. Routledge. ISBN 978-1-317-77770-0.
- Littleton, C. Scott (1998). Mythology: The Illustrated Anthology of World Myth & Storytelling. Duncan Baird Publishers. ISBN 978-1-84483-061-9.
- Littleton, C. Scott (2002). Understanding Shinto: Origins, Beliefs, Practices, Festivals, Spirits, Sacred Places. Watkins Pub. ISBN 978-1-907486-70-8.

== Sources ==
- Malcor, Linda (November 25, 2011). "C. Scott Littleton". Journal of Indo-European Studies. 39 (1–2). Institute for the Study of Man: 230–231. ProQuest 1095735658.
- Miller, Dean (November 25, 2011). "C. Scott Littleton". Journal of Indo-European Studies. 39 (3–4). Institute for the Study of Man: 496–498. ProQuest 1095612957.
- "C. Scott Littleton". Los Angeles Times. September 5, 2010. p. 37 – via Newspapers.com.
- "C. Scott Littleton". Gale Literature: Contemporary Authors. Gale. January 12, 2011.
