= Nicholas Allen (anthropologist) =

English anthropologist (1939–2020)

- Born: 8 July 1939; London, England
- Died: 21 March 2020 (aged 80)
- Children: 2

Academic background
- Education: Oxford University
- Academic advisor: Rodney Needham
- Influences: Georges Dumézil

Academic work
- Discipline: Social anthropology
- Institutions: Wolfson College, Oxford
- Main interests: Indo-European studies

Nicholas Justin Allen (8 July 1939 – 21 March 2020) was an English physician and social anthropologist who specialized in Indo-European studies. Allen was Viceregent at Wolfson College, Oxford and Anthropology Editor of the Journal of Indo-European Studies.

== Biography ==
Nicholas Allen was born in London, England on 8 July 1939. He descended from a long line of British Army officers and administrators in British India. His father was a civil servant with a strong interest in Celtic studies.

After graduating from Rugby School, Allen received a Classics Scholarship to study at New College, Oxford. He started studying medicine at the University of Oxford in 1957, and received his BM BCh in 1964. Allen subsequently worked at St Mary's Hospital, London for a year. Inspired by Alfred Cort Haddon History of Anthropology, Allen began studying anthropology at the University of Oxford in 1965, where he was a member of Linacre College. During this time he also acquired proficiency in Nepali by taking courses at the SOAS University of London. He received his BLitt in 1969, and lectured in anthropology at the University of Durham from 1972 to 1976. He received his PhD in 1976. His thesis was supervised by Rodney Needham. It examined the oral traditions of Kirati people of east Nepal. His thesis was eventually published under the title Miyapma: Traditional Narratives of the Thulung Rai (2015), and is considered a pioneering and fundamental work on the anthropology of Nepal. During his studies, Allen took courses in Paris, where he became acquainted with the research of Georges Dumézil and became a friend of Louis Dumont. Allen's subsequent research was significantly influenced by the research of Dumézil, Dumont and Christoph von Fürer-Haimendorf.

Allen began lecturing on social anthropology at Oxford University in 1976, becoming a Governing Body Fellow at Wolfson College, Oxford. At Wolfson he distinguished himself as a teacher and researcher. He supervised a large number of doctoral students. From 1985 to 1987 he was Viceregent at Wolfson College. Allen was made Reader in the Social Anthropology of South Asia at Wolfson College in 1997, and served as Head of Department. Allen retired from Wolfson as Emeritus Fellow at the School of Anthropology and Museum Ethnography in 2001, but continued to teach and research.

Allen's research centered on kinship, the anthropology of the Himalayas, Tibeto-Burman languages, peoples and cultures, and Indo-European studies. He was strongly influenced by the research of Émile Durkheim, Marcel Mauss, Georges Dumézil and Louis Dumont. Allen was considered one the world's foremost authorities on the comparative study of Indo-European mythology, on which he made significant contributions. He had deep knowledge of both Celtic, Greek, Indian and Roman mythology and literature. Throughout his career, Allen was an editor of several publications, including World Anthropology, the Journal of Hindu Studies, the Journal of Indo-European Studies, and Studia Indo-Europaea. He was the author of seven books, eighty articles and hundreds of scholarly reviews. He was notably Mythology Editor at the Journal of Indo-European Studies for twenty years.

Allen died on 21 March 2020. He was survived by his wife Sheila and two daughters.

== Selected works ==
- Sketch of Thulung grammar, with three texts and a glossary, Cornell University China-Japan Program, 1975
- (Editor with R. Gombrich, T. Raychaudhuri and G. Rizvi) Oxford University Papers on India, OUP, 1986
- (Editor with W. S. F. Pickering and W. Watts Miller) On Durkheim’s Elementary Forms of Religious Life, Routledge, 1998a
- (Editor with W. James) Marcel Mauss: A Centenary Tribute, Berghahn, 1998b
- Categories and Classifications: Maussian Reflections on the Social, Berghhan, 2000
- (Editor and Translator) Marcel Mauss: Manual of Ethnography, Berghahn, 2007
- (Editor with Hilary Callan, Robin Dunbar and Wendy James) Early Human Kinship: From Sex to Social Reproduction, Blackwell, 2008
- Miyapma: Traditional Narratives of the Thulung Rai, Vajra Publications, 2015
- Arjuna–Odysseus: Shared Heritage in Indian and Greek Epic, Routledge, 2020

== See also ==
- David W. Anthony
- A. Richard Diebold Jr.

== Sources ==
- Parkin, Robert (24 March 2020). "Dr Nicholas Allen (1939-2020)". Wolfson College, Oxford.
- Vukovic, Kresimir (2020). "In Memoriam Nicholas Justin Allen". Journal of Indo-European Studies. 48 (1–2): 240–242.
