= Arnaldo Momigliano =

Italian historian of classical antiquity (1908–1987)

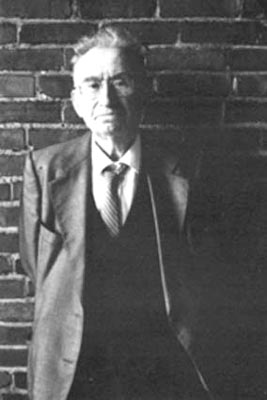
Arnaldo Momigliano

Arnaldo Dante Momigliano (5 September 1908 – 1 September 1987) was an Italian historian of classical antiquity, known for his work in historiography, and characterised by Donald Kagan as "the world's leading student of the writing of history in the ancient world". He was a MacArthur Fellow in 1987.

== Biography ==
Momigliano was born on 5 September 1908 in Caraglio, Piedmont. In 1936, he became Professor of Roman History at the University of Turin, but as a Jew, soon lost his position due to the anti-Jewish Racial Laws enacted by the Fascist regime in 1938, and moved to England, where he remained. After a time at Oxford University, he taught Ancient History at the University of Bristol where he was made a lecturer in 1947. He went to University College London and was elected Chair of Ancient History from 1951 to 1975. He was a Fellow of the Warburg Institute and supervised the PhD of Wolf Liebeschuetz. Momigliano visited regularly at the University of Chicago where he was named Alexander White Professor in the Humanities, and at the Scuola Normale Superiore di Pisa. He wrote reviews for The New York Review of Books. In addition to studying the ancient Greek historians and their methods, he also took an interest in modern historians, such as Edward Gibbon, and wrote a number of studies of them.

After 1930, Momigliano contributed a number of biographies to the Enciclopedia Italiana; in the 1940s and 1950s he contributed biographies to the Oxford Classical Dictionary and Encyclopædia Britannica. In his retirement, he was made a distinguished visiting professor for life at the University of Chicago and held fellowships at All Souls College, Oxford and Peterhouse, Cambridge. He was elected to the American Philosophical Society in 1969 and the American Academy of Arts and Sciences in 1971. In 1974 he was made an honorary Knight Commander of the Order of the British Empire (KBE).

Momigliano died in London on 1 September 1987. A number of his essays were collected into volumes published posthumously. The University of Bristol also established an academic prize in his name, awarded for the best undergraduate performance in Ancient History.

== Views ==
In the 1930s, Momigliano joined the National Fascist Party, swore loyalty to Benito Mussolini, and sought exemption from antisemitic Italian racial laws as a party member. He believed that several classical works of European literature had contributed to the nationalism and warfare in Europe, and considered works such as Germania and the Iliad as "among the most dangerous books ever written". He considered it wasteful and "comical" to spend much efforts at identifying and explaining the forces held responsible for the gradual disintegration of the Roman Empire. In the 1980s, Momigliano and fellow historian Carlo Ginzburg leveled heavy criticism against French philologist Georges Dumézil, whom they charged with being a fascist opposed to "Judeo-Christian" society. Momigliano's attacks on Dumézil, who was then in very poor health, have been described as "unfair and vicious" by Edgar C. Polomé.

== Works ==
- Claudius, the Emperor, and his achievement, Oxford: Clarendon Press, 1934.
- George Grote and the Study of Greek History, London: Lewis, 1952.
- The Conflict Between Paganism and Christianity in the Fourth Century, Clarendon Press, 1963
- Studies in Historiography, Garland Pub., 1985, ISBN 978-0-8240-6372-6
- The Development of Greek Biography: Four Lectures, Harvard University Press, 1971; revised and expanded, Harvard University Press, 1993, ISBN 978-0-674-20041-8
- Alien Wisdom: The Limits of Hellenization, Cambridge University Press, 1975; reprint, Cambridge University Press, 1978, 1990, 1991, 1993 ISBN 978-0-521-38761-3
- Essays in Ancient and Modern Historiography, Wesleyan University Press, 1977, ISBN 978-0-8195-5010-1
- "History and Biography" and "Greek Culture and the Jews", in The Legacy of Greece, a new Appraisal, Moses I Finley (ed.), Clarendon Press, Oxford, 1981
- How to Reconcile Greeks and Trojans, North-Holland Pub. Co., 1982
- "Premesse per una discussione su Georges Dumézil", Opus 2 (1983): 329–42.
  - English translation: "Introduction to a Discussion of Georges Dumezil", in Studies on Modern Scholarship (see below), pp. 286–301.
- "Georges Dumézil and the Trifunctional Approach to Roman Civilization", History and Theory 23, no. 3 (1984): 312–20.
- "Two Types of Universal History: The Cases of E. A. Freeman and Max Weber," The Journal of Modern History Vol. 58, No. 1, March 1986
- On Pagans, Jews and Christians, reprint, Wesleyan University Press, 1987, ISBN 978-0-8195-6218-0
- The Classical Foundations of Modern Historiography, University of California Press, 1990, ISBN 978-0-520-07870-3
- Essays on Ancient and Modern Judaism, Editor Silvia Berti, University of Chicago Press, 1994; ISBN 978-0-226-53381-0
- Bowersock, G. W.; Cornell, T. J., eds. (1994). A. D. Momigliano: Studies on Modern Scholarship. Berkeley: University of California Press. ISBN 0520070011.
- "The Rules of the Game in the Study of Ancient History", History and Theory 55, no. 1 (February 2016).

== Sources ==
- Arvidsson, Stefan (2006). Jones, Lindsay (ed.). Aryan Idols: Indo-European Mythology as Ideology and Science. Translated by Wichmann, Sonia. University of Chicago Press. pp. 9734–9736. ISBN 0226028607.
- Todd, Robert B. (2004). The Dictionary of British Classicists. Vol. 2. Bristol: Thoemmes Continuum. p. 661. ISBN 1-85506-997-0. OCLC 187531343.
