= Marijan Mole =

Slovenian-Polish scholar of Middle and Modern Iranian studies

Marijan Molé (28 July 1924, in Ljubljana – 6 May 1963, in Paris) was a Slovenian-Polish scholar of Middle and Modern Iranian studies, who also contributed to the fields of Islamic and particularly Sufi studies.

== Biography ==
His father, Vojeslav Molé (1886-1973), was a Slovenian writer and historian of art who lectured at the University of Ljubljana. In 1925 he moved as a visiting professor to Poland, the native land of Marijan's mother. Molé showed an early interest in linguistics and mathematics. When World War II broke out, his family escaped to Leopoli in Ukraine. Back in Poland, he obtained his doctorate in Iranian philology under the direction of Tadeusz Jan Kowalski at the Jagiellonian University. In 1949 he was invited by the French government to pursue his studies in Paris. There he made the acquaintance of Jean de Menasce, who became an influential figure for him, and of other renowned specialists in Iranian and Islamic studies such as Louis Massignon and Henry Corbin. Molè eventually settled permanently in France, where he married Éliane Janet, and from where he would make study trips to Iran, staying for periods at Tehran's Institut Français d'Iranologie. Molé was found dead in his Paris apartment at the age of 39, when he was already considered one of the most gifted Iranists of his generation. He was survived by his wife and a son.

== Bibliography ==
- "Na prograniczu czterech światów", Młodej Rzeczypospolitej 27 (8—15 grudnia 1946).
- "Kilka uwag o rozwoju prasłowiańskiego systemu wokalicznego w porównaniu z niektórymi innymi językami indoeuropejskimi", Sprawozdania Polskiej Akademii Umiejętności XLIX, no 1 (Kraków, 1948), pp. 18–21.
- "Z historii prasłowiańskiego ě w słoweńskim", Rocznik Slawistyczny 16 (1948), pp. 24–7.
- "Contributions à l’étude du genre grammatical en Hittite", Rocznik Orientalistyczny 15 (Kraków, 1948), pp. 25–62.
- "Rustam a Krsāspa. Przyczynek do badań nad formacją eposu irańskiego", Sprawozdania PAU XLIX, no 6 (1948), pp. 269–72.
- "Legenda o Yamie w 2. fargardzie Vendidād i początki dualizmu irańskiego", Sprawozdania PAU XLIX, no 7 (1948), pp. 355–9.
- "Iranian Notes", Lingua Poznaniensis 1 (Poznan, 1949), pp. 244–51.
- "Wyrazy irańskie w Piśmie św.", Ruch Biblijny i Liturgiczny (Kraków, 1950).
- "Problem lokalizacji języka awestyjskiego", Biuletyn Polskiego Towarzystwa Językoznawczego 10 (Kraków, 1950), pp. 156–7.
- "Garshāsp et les Sagsār", 3 (1951), pp. 128–38.
- "Les implications historiques du prologue du Livre d’Artā Vīrāz", Revue de l’histoire des religions (1951), 35—44.
- "Riassunto del precedente", Proceedings of the 7th Congress for the History of Religions (Amsterdam, 4—9 September 1950), pp. 135–7.
- "La structure du premier chapitre du Vidēvdāt", Journal Asiatique 239 (1951), pp. 283–98.
- "Un poème «persan» du comte de Gobineau", La Nouvelle Clio 4 (1952), pp. 116–30.
- "Some Remarks on the Nineteenth Fargard of the Vidēdvāt", Rocznik Orientalistyczny 16 (Kraków, 1949), pp. 281–9 (Mélanges Th. Kowalski).
- "Le partage du monde dans la tradition iranienne", Journal Asiatique CCXL/4 (1952), pp. 455–63.
- "Deux aspects de la formation de l’orthodoxie zoroastrienne", Annuaire de l’Institut de Philologie et d’Histoire Orientales et Slaves 12 (1952), pp. 289–324 (Mélanges Henri Grégoire IV).
- "L’épopée iranienne après Firdōsī", La Nouvelle Clio 5 (1953), pp. 377–93 (Mélanges A. Dupont-Sommer).
- "Le partage du monde dans la tradition iranienne. Note complémentaire", Journal Asiatique 241, no 2 (1953), pp. 271–3.
- "Compte rendu de Sven S. Hartman, Gayōmart. Etude sur le syncrétisme dans l’ancien ", RHR 146 (1954/2), pp. 228–31.
- "La religion iranienne et le zoroastrisme", Atti dell’VIII Congresso Internazionale di Storia delle Religioni a Roma, 18 aprile 1955, pp. 206–9.
- "La version persane du Traité des dix principes de Najm al-Dīn Kobrā par ‘Alī b. Shihāb al-Dīn Hamadānī", Farhang-e Īrān Zamīn 6 (1338), pp. 38–66.
- "Naqšbandiyāt I: Quelques traités naqšbandis", Farhang-e Īrān-Zamīn 5 (1337), pp. 273–323.
- "Un ascétisme moral dans les livres pehlevis", RHR 155 (1959/1), pp. 145–90.
- "L’ordre des Gāthās", Akten des XXIV. Internazionalen Orientalisten-Kongresses (Monaco, August 30, 1957), p. 474.
- "La naissance du monde dans l’Iran préislamique", Sources Orientales I: La naissance du monde (Paris: éditions du Seuil, 1959), pp. 299–328.
- "La guerre des Géants selon le Sūtkar nask", Indo-Iranian Journal 3 (1959), pp. 282–305.
- "Autour du Daré Mansour: L’apprentissage mystique de Bahā’ al-Dīn Naqshband", Revue des Études Islamiques (1959), pp. 35–66.
- "Le problème zurvanite", Journal Asiatique 247 (1959), pp. 431–69.
- "Deux notes sur le Rāmāyana", Hommages à Georges Dumézil (Bruxelles, 1960), pp. 140–50 (Collection Latomus XLV).
- "Daēnā, le pont Činvat et l’initiation dans le Mazdéisme", RHR 157 (1960), pp. 155–85.
- Reviews: "Ringbone, Paradisus Terrestris"; "Aubin, Matériaux pour la biographie de Shāh Ni‘matullāh Walī Kermānī"; "Gölpinarlī, Vilāyet-nāme", RHR 157 (1960), pp. 250–1, 253—6, 256.
- "Vīs u Rāmīn et l’histoire seldjoukide", Annali dell’Istituto Orientale di, NS 9 (1960), 1—30.
- "Compte rendu de Humbach, Die Gāthās des Zarathustra", RHR 158 (1960), pp. 83–9.
- "Rituel et escatologie dans le mazdéisme", Numen 1 (1960), pp. 148–60.
- "Le jugement des morts dans l’Iran préislamique", Sources Orientales IV: Le jugement des morts (1961), pp. 146–75.
- "Naqšbandiyāt III", Farhang-e Īrān-Zamīn 8 (1339), pp. 72–134.
- "Réponse à M. Duchesne-Guillemin", Numen 8 (1961), pp. 51–63.
- "Un traité de ‘Alā’ al-Dawla Simnānī sur ‘Alī b. Tālib (= Kubrawiyāt IV)", Bulletin d’Études Orientales de l’Institut français de Damas 16 (1958—1960), pp. 61–99.
- Reviews: " Religiosa"; "Rypka, Iranische Literaturgeschichte", RHR 159 (1961), pp. 226–30, 250—2.
- "Kubrawiyāt II: ‘Alī b. Şihābeddīn-i Hamadānī’nin Risāla-i Futuvvatiyya’si", Şarkiyet Mecmuasi IV (1961), pp. 33–72.
- "Le problème des sectes zoroastriennes dans les livres pehlevis", Oriens 13-14 (1960–61), pp. 1–28.
- "La lune en Iran ancien", Sources Orientales VI: La lune. Mythes et Rites (1962), pp. 219–29.
- "Temps et sacrifice dans la religion zoroastrienne", Bulletin de la Société Ernest-Renan, NS 10 (1961), pp. 124–6.
- "Les Kubrawiya entre sunnisme et shiisme aux huitième et neuvième siècles de l’hégire", Revue des Etudes Islamiques 29 (1961), pp. 61–142.
- "Professions de foi de deux Kubrawīs: ‘Alī-i Hamadānī et Muhammad Nūrbakhsh", Bulletin d’Études Orientales de l’Institut français de Damas 17 (1961—1962), pp. 133–204.
- ‘Azīzoddīn Nasafī, Le Livre de l’Homme Parfait (Kitāb Insān al-Kāmil). Recueil de traités de soufisme en persan publiés avec une introduction — Bibliothèque Iranienne 11 (Paris: Maisonneuve, 1962).
- "Une histoire du mazdéisme est-elle possible? — Notes et remarques en marge d’un ouvrage récent (Premier Article)", RHR 162 (1962/2), pp. 45—67.
- "Yasna 45 et la cosmogonie mazdéenne", ZDMG 112, Hf. 2 (1962), pp. 345—52.
- "Traites mineurs de Nağm al-Dīn Kubrā", Annales Islamologiques 4 (Cairo, 1963), pp. 1—78.
- Culte, mythe et cosmologie dans l’Iran ancien (Paris, 1963).
- "La danse extatique en islam", Sources Orientales VI: Les Danses Sacrées (1963), pp. 145—280 – posthumously.
- "Entre le mazdéisme et l’islam: la bonne et la mauvaise religion", Mélanges d’orientalisme offerts à Henri Massé à l’occasion de son 75ème anniversaire / G. C. Anawati, A. J. Arberry, H. W. Bailey [et al.] (Tehran, 1963), pp. 303—16 – posthumously.
- "There is a time for everything", Dr J. M. Unvala Memorial Volume [ii], xviii (Bombay, 1964) – posthumously. A review on: J. K. Teufel. Eine Lebensbeschreibung des Scheichs ‘Ali-i Hamadani (gestorben 1385). Die Xulāsat ul-manāqib des Maulānā Nur ud-Din Ca‘far-i Badaxsi (Leiden: Brill, 1962) in ZDMG 114, Hft. 2 (1964), 437-8 – posthumously. Les mystiques musulmans (Paris: Presses universitaires de France, 1965; Paris: Les Deux Océans, 1982) – posthumously. L’Iran ancient (Paris, 1965) – posthumously; translated into Persian as: Irān bāstān (Tehran, 1977).
- La legende de Zoroastre selon les textes pehlevis, Travaux de l’Institut d’Études Iraniennes 3 (Paris, 1967; 1993) – posthumously.

== External Sources ==
- A. Khismatulin, S. Azarnouche, "The Destiny of a Genius Scholar": Marijan Molé (1924—1963) and His Archives in Paris”, in: Manuscripta Orientalia, 20/2 (St. Petersburg: Thesa, 2014), 45–56.
