= Western Folklore =

- Discipline: Regional, national, and international Folklore
- Language: English
- Edited by: Rachel Gonzalez-Martin

Publication details
- Former name: California Folklore Quarterly
- History: 1942-present
- Publisher: Western States Folklore Society (United States)
- Frequency: Quarterly

Standard abbreviations
- ISO 4: West. Folk.

Indexing
- ISSN: 0043-373X
- LCCN: 44049420
- JSTOR: 0043373X
- OCLC no.: 5910334

Links
- Journal homepage; Online access

Western Folklore is a quarterly academic journal for the study of folklore published by the Western States Folklore Society (formerly the California Folklore Society). It was established in 1942 as the California Folklore Quarterly and obtained its current name in 1947. It is indexed in JSTOR.

== Abstracting and indexing ==
The journal is abstracted and indexed in Historical Abstracts, Humanities Index, Music Index, Prepublication Online Data System, and Arts and Humanities Search.
