= Franz Rolf Schröder =

German philologist

- Born: 8 September 1893; Kiel, Germany
- Died: 24 March 1979 (aged 85); Würzburg, Germany

Academic background
- Education: University of Kiel; Heidelberg University
- Doctoral advisor: Hugo Gering

Academic work
- Discipline: Philology
- Sub-discipline: Germanic philology
- Institutions: University of Würzburg
- Doctoral students: Norbert Wagner
- Main interests: Germanic religion; Indo-European religion

Franz Rolf Schröder (8 September 1893 – 24 March 1979), often referred to as F. R. Schröder, was a German philologist who was Professor and Chair of German Philology at the University of Würzburg. He specialized in the study German and early Germanic literature, and Germanic and Indo-European religion. He was for many decades editor of the Germanisch-Romanische Monatsschrift.

== Biography ==
Franz Rolf Schröder was born in Kiel, Germany on 8 September 1893. He was the son of Johannes Franz Heinrich Schröder and Minna Amanda Rolfs. His father was a prominent linguist and educator, and editor of the Germanisch-Romanische Monatsschrift.

Schröder graduated from high school in 1911, and subsequently studied German philology at the University of Kiel. He served as a volunteer in the German Army during the early months of World War I, and gained a PhD at Kiel in 1916 under the supervision of Hugo Gering. His thesis was on the Hálfdanar saga Eysteinssonar. He completed his habilitation in German and Nordic philology at Heidelberg University in 1920 with a thesis on the Nibelungen. Schröder subsequently lectured at Heidelberg.

In 1925, Schröder was made Professor and Chair of German Philology at the University of Würzburg. He would eventually also succeed his father as editor of the Germanisch-Romanische Monatsschrift. Schröder specialized in the study of Germanic religion from a comparative perspective, and was particularly interested in its relationship with Indo-European religion.

Schröder retired in 1959, and was made a Corresponding Member of the Austrian Academy of Sciences in 1965. He died in Würzburg on 24 March 1979.

== Selected works ==
- Germanentum und Hellenismus. Untersuchungen zur germanischen Religionsgeschichte, 1924
- Die Parzivalfrage, 1928
- Altgermanische Kulturprobleme, 1929
- Die Germanen – Religionsgeschichtliches Lesebuch, 1929
- Quellenbuch zur germanischen Religionsgeschichte, 1933
- Germanische Heldendichtung, 1935
- Untersuchungen zur germanischen und vergleichenden Religionsgeschichte, 1941

== See also ==
- Jan de Vries (philologist)
- Hermann Güntert
- Edgar C. Polomé
- Otto Höfler
- Gabriel Turville-Petre
- Rudolf Much
- Wolfgang Krause

== Sources ==
- Wagner, Norbert [in German] (2004). "Ranke". In Beck, Heinrich; Geuenich, Dieter; Steuer, Heiko (eds.). Reallexikon der Germanischen Altertumskunde (in German). Vol. 27. Walter de Gruyter. pp. 334–336. ISBN 3110181169.
