= Martin Puhvel =

Canadian linguist

Martin Puhvel (9 December 1933 – 7 December 2016) was an Estonian-Canadian literature researcher.

== Early life and education ==
Puhvel was born in Tallinn, Estonia. Jaan Puhvel was his brother. The family moved to Finland in 1944, and thereafter to Sweden in the same year and to Canada in 1949.

Puhvel studied at McGill University from 1949–1954, and at Harvard University from 1954–1958.

== Career ==
Puhvel was a lecturer at McGill University for old and medieval English literature from 1957 to 1996. He had been a professor since 1980 and professor emeritus since 1998.

Puhvel published 52 works, including the books Beowulf and Celtic Tradition, The Crossroads in Folklore and Myth, Cause and Effect in 'Beowulf, and Beowulf: A Verse Translation and Introduction. He lectured in Canada, the United States, Britain and Italy. He was a member of a number of academic organizations.
