= Jaan Puhvel =

Estonian linguist (1932–2026)

- Puhvel in 2008
- Born: 24 January 1932; Tallinn, Estonia
- Died: 25 April 2026 (aged 94); Los Angeles, California, U.S.
- Spouse: Madli Puhvel (m. 1960)
- Children: 3
- Father: Karl Puhvel
- Relatives: Martin Puhvel (brother)
- Awards: Order of the White Star, Third Class (2001)

Academic background
- Education: McGill University; Harvard University
- Academic advisors: Georges Dumézil; Stig Wikander

Academic work
- Discipline: Linguistics
- Sub-discipline: Indo-European studies
- Institutions: University of California, Los Angeles
- Notable students: C. Scott Littleton; Donald J. Ward
- Main interests: Hittites; Proto-Indo-European mythology and society
- Notable works: Hittite Etymological Dictionary (1984–)

Jaan Puhvel (24 January 1932 – 25 April 2026) was an Estonian comparative linguist and comparative mythologist who specialised in Indo-European studies. Born in Estonia, Puhvel fled his country with his family in 1944 and eventually ended up in Canada. After gaining his Ph.D. in comparative linguistics at Harvard University, he became a professor of classical languages, Indo-European studies and Hittite at the University of California, Los Angeles (UCLA).

At UCLA, he founded the Center for the Study of Comparative Folklore and Mythology and was Chairman of the Department of Classics. Puhvel was the founder of the Hittite Etymological Dictionary, and the author and editor of several works on Proto-Indo-European mythology and Proto-Indo-European society.

== Early life and education ==
Jaan Puhvel was born in Tallinn, Estonia, on 24 January 1932, the son of Karl Puhvel and Meta Elisabeth Paern. His father, a surveyor by profession, was a forest manager working for the Estonian government. Jaan received his earliest education in Aegviidu and at the Jakob Westholm Gymnasium. In April 1944, ahead of the expected Soviet occupation of the Baltic states, the family emigrated to Finland. The following autumn they moved to Sweden. While a high school student in Sweden, Puhvel decided that he wanted to become a scholar in Indo-European linguistics.

Puhvel graduated from high school in Sweden in 1949, and his family subsequently emigrated to Canada. He studied Latin, French and Ancient Greek at McGill University, where he graduated with an MA in comparative linguistics in 1952, for which he earned the Governor General's Gold Medal.

With a scholarship from the Canadian government, Puhvel went to study at Harvard University, where he was elected a Member of the Harvard Society of Fellows in 1953. From 1954 to 1955, he studied at Sorbonne University in Paris, France, and at Uppsala University in Uppsala, Sweden. In Paris, his teachers included the linguists Émile Benveniste, Georges Dumézil, Pierre Chantraine and Michel Lejeune, and the philologist Alfred Ernout, while at Uppsala, philologist Stig Wikander was among his teachers. He subsequently lectured on the classics at McGill, Harvard and University of Texas at Austin. Puhvel gained his PhD in comparative linguistics at Harvard University in 1959 with a dissertation on the laryngeal theory. It was later published as Laryngeals and the Indo-European Verb (1960).

== Career ==
Puhvel taught classical languages and comparative Indo-European linguistics at the University of California, Los Angeles (UCLA), from 1958. In 1965, he was appointed Professor of Indo-European Studies there. Puhvel founded the Center for the Study of Comparative Folklore and Mythology at UCLA in 1961. At UCLA, he was Director of the Center for Research in Languages and Linguistics (1962–1967), Vice Chairman of Indo-European Studies (1964–1968), and Chairman of the Department of Classics (1968–1975). Prominent students of Puhvel at UCLA include anthropologist C. Scott Littleton and folklorist Donald J. Ward.

He was President of the Association for the Advancement of Baltic Studies from 1971 to 1972. He was a member of many other scholarly organizations, including the Linguistic Society of America, the American Oriental Society and the American Philological Association. Puhvel was a Fellow of the American Council of Learned Societies (1961–1962), and a Guggenheim Fellow (1968–1969). He became an Officer First Class of the Order of the White Rose of Finland in 1967. Puhvel is the creator of the Hittite Etymological Dictionary (1984–), which as of 2020 has been published in ten volumes. This project represents the culmination of more than a half a century of work by Puhvel. Since volume 5 (2001), it complements the Chicago Hittite Dictionary, which began in 1980.

Puhvel retired from UCLA as Professor Emeritus of Classical Linguistics, Indo-European Studies and Hittite. He was a visiting professor at the University of Tartu from 1993 to 1999. Studies in Honor of Jaan Puhvel (1997), a Festschrift in his honor, was published in two parts by the Institute for the Study of Man. Puhvel received the Estonian Order of the White Star, Third Class in 2001. He took part in the editing process of the Epic of Gilgamesh when the translation into Estonian was being prepared.

The Estonian poet Kaarel Kressa characterized Puhvel as one of the world's most prominent Hittitologists, and one of the foremost Estonian scholars.

== Personal life and death ==
Puhvel married Estonian microbiologist Madli Puhvel on 4 June 1960, with whom he had three children. He was the brother of philologist Martin Puhvel. Jaan Puhvel resided in Encino, Los Angeles, but spent every summer at the restored family farm in Kõrvemaa, Estonia.

Puhvel died on 25 April 2026, at the age of 94.

== Selected works ==
- (Contributor) Studies Presented to Joshua Whatmough, Mouton, 1957.
- Laryngeals and the Indo-European Verb. University of California Press, 1960.
- (Contributor) Mycenaean Studies, University of Wisconsin Press, 1964.
- (Contributor) Evidence for Laryngeals, Mouton, 1965.
- (Editor with Henrik Birnbaum, and Contributor) Ancient Indo-European Dialects, University of California Press, 1966.
- (Editor) Substance and Structure of Language, University of California Press, 1969.
- (Editor and Contributor) Myth and Law among the Indo-Europeans: Studies in Indo-European Comparative Mythology, University of California Press, 1970.
- (Contributor) Indo-European and Indo- Europeans, University of Pennsylvania Press, 1970.
- (Editor and Contributor) Baltic Literature and Linguistics, Association for the Advancement of Baltic Studies, 1973.
- (Co-editor with Gerald James Larson and C. Scott Littleton, and Contributor) Myth in Indo-European Antiquity, University of California Press, 1974.
- (Editor with Ronald Stroud) California Studies in Classical Antiquity, Volume 8, University of California Press, 1976.
- Analecta Indoeuropaea, Institut für Sprachwissenschaft der Universität Innsbruck, 1981.
- (Editor) Georges Dumezil, The Stakes of the Warrior, University of California Press, 1983.
- (Editor) Hittite Etymological Dictionary. Mouton de Gruyter, 1984– .
- (Editor with David Weeks) The Plight of the Sorcerer, University of California Press, 1986.
- Comparative Mythology, The Johns Hopkins University Press, 1987.
- Homer and Hittite. Institut für Sprachwissenschaft der Universität Innsbruck, 1991.
- Ulgvel ja umbes: poole sajandi hajalauitmeid, esseid ja arvustusi, Ilmamaa, 2001.
- Võõraile võõrsil: eesti- ja soomeainelisi esseid ja arvustusi, Ilmamaa, 2007.
- (Contributor) Gilgameši eepos”, Alfapress, 2010.

== Sources ==
- Disterheft, Dorothy; Huld, Martin; Greppin, John, eds. (1997). "Bibliography of Jaan Puhvel". Studies in Honor of Jaan Puhvel – Part 1. Journal of Indo-European Studies Monograph Series. Vol. 20. Institute for the Study of Man. pp. IX–?. ISBN 0-941694-54-2. ISSN 0895-7258.
- Valk, Ülo (2007). "Päike Anatoolia maastikel. Jaan Puhvel 75" (PDF). Keel ja Kirjandus. 74–75. Association for the Advancement of Baltic Studies: 37–39.
- "Jaan Puhvel". Contemporary Authors. Gale. 13 February 2001.
