= Contemporary Authors =

Biographical reference work published by Gale Cengage

- Country: United States
- Language: English
- Discipline: Reference
- Publisher: Gale
- Published: 1962–present

Contemporary Authors is a reference work that has been published by Gale since 1962. The work provides short biographies and bibliographies of contemporary and near-contemporary writers and is a major source of information on over 116,000 living and deceased authors from around the world. The work is a standard in libraries and has been described by the American Library Association as a distinguished reference title.

== Content ==
Entries in Contemporary Authors consist of a biography of the writer and bibliographies of their work and secondary sources covering it. Along with featuring biographies of fiction and nonfiction writers, Contemporary Authors also includes authors who write for newspapers, magazines, motion pictures, TV, and theater.

Writing need not be a person's primary occupation for them to be covered in Contemporary Authors; Martin Luther King Jr. and Bear Bryant have entries even though they are not mainly known as writers. The series focuses on people who have published in English, but sometimes includes writers in other languages whose works have been translated. Contemporary Authors is not selective about whom it includes. However, according to Gale, authors whose works have been published only by vanity presses are generally excluded.

Most biographical data published in Contemporary Authors comes from questionnaire responses. Its staff may also conduct independent research if an entry's subject does not respond to questions. Some entries contain a "Sidelights" section where writers can offer personal commentary on their life or work.

== Publication ==
The first edition of Contemporary Authors was released in 1962. The work has since become a standard in libraries. As of 1990, it was published twice per year.

Contemporary Authors has been published in five different series, each assigned its own entry in the International Standard Serial Number database: the original series, not otherwise named; first revision; new revision; permanent; and autobiography series. Some of its iterations group multiple volumes into a single printed book. As of 2002, it was published both in print and on CD-ROM.

Gale also provides an online version of Contemporary Authors, which includes updates to previously published biographies, expanded entries, award listings, and other information. The online entries are also cross-referenced to other Gale online works, such as the Dictionary of Literary Biography.

== Reception ==
In 1985, the American Library Association named Contemporary Authors one of the "most distinguished reference titles" of the preceding 25 years.
