= Émile Benveniste =

Ottoman-born French linguist (1902–1976)

- Born: 27 May 1902; Aleppo, Ottoman Empire (modern-day Syria)
- Died: 3 October 1976 (aged 74); Versailles, France

Émile Benveniste (French: [emil bɛ̃venist]; 27 May 1902 – 3 October 1976) was an Ottoman-born French structural linguist and semiotician. He is best known for his work on Indo-European languages and his critical reformulation of the linguistic paradigm established by Ferdinand de Saussure.

== Biography ==
Émile Benveniste was born Ezra Benveniste in Aleppo, Aleppo Vilayet, Ottoman Syria. His father, Mathatias Benveniste, was born into a prominent Sephardic family in Smyrna, and his mother, Maria née Malkenson, was an Ashkenazi born in Vilna. Both parents worked as school inspectors for the Alliance Israélite Universelle. He had an older brother, Henri né Hillel, who was murdered at Auschwitz in 1942, and a younger sister, Carmelia, who died in 1979.

Benveniste's father sent him to Paris to undertake rabbinical studies, but he left the Rabbinical School after receiving his baccalauréat, and enrolled in the École pratique des hautes études. There he studied under Antoine Meillet, a former student of Saussure, and Joseph Vendryes, completing his degree in 1920. He gained his teaching qualification in 1922, and taught at the Collège Sévigné in Paris for two years. Benveniste changed his first name to Émile upon naturalization as a French citizen in 1924. He then spent 18 months in Pune, British India working as a tutor to children of the Tata family. After serving as an infantryman in the Rif War from 1926 to 1927 (despite personal opposition to the war), he would return to the École pratique des hautes études in 1927 as a director of studies, and would receive his doctorate there in 1935, with his major thesis on the formation of noun roots, and his secondary thesis on the Avestan infinitive. Following Meillet's death in 1936, he was elected to the Chair of Comparative Grammar in the Collège de France in 1937. He was taken prisoner by the invading Germans in 1940, and escaped in 1941, spending most of the rest of the war in exile in Switzerland. He held his seat at the Collège de France until his death, but ceased lecturing in December 1969, after suffering a stroke that left him aphasic. He also held several high academic positions as a scholar of Iranian and Armenian studies. A few months prior to his 1969 stroke, he was elected as the first President of the International Association for Semiotic Studies, and stayed nominally in that position until 1972. Benveniste died in a nursing home in Versailles, aged 74. He is buried in Versailles at the Cimetière des Gonards.

== Career ==
At the start of his career, his highly specialised and technical work limited his influence to a small circle of scholars. In the late thirties, he aroused some controversy for challenging the influential Saussurian notion of the sign, that posited a binary distinction between the phonic shape of any given word (signifier) and the idea associated with it (signified). Saussure argued that the relationship between the two was psychological, and purely arbitrary. Benveniste challenged this model in his Nature du signe linguistique. In 1934 he co-authored Vrtra et Vrθragna: Étude de Mythologie Indo-Iranienne, with Louis Renou. As the text's 'Avant-Propos' says, Renou wrote the part on India, and Benveniste the part on Iran, the Introduction and Conclusion.

The publication of his monumental text, Problèmes de linguistique générale or Problems in General Linguistics, would elevate his position to much wider recognition. The two volumes of this work appeared in 1966 and 1974 respectively. The book exhibits not only scientific rigour but also a lucid style accessible to the layman, consisting of various writings culled from a period of more than twenty-five years. In Chapter 5, Animal Communication and Human Language, Benveniste repudiated behaviourist linguistic interpretations by demonstrating that human speech, unlike the so-called languages of bees and other animals, cannot be merely reduced to a stimulus-response system.

The I–you polarity is another important development explored in the text. The third person acts under the conditions of possibility of this polarity between the first and second persons. Narration and description illustrate this.

"I signifies "the person who is uttering the present instance of the discourse containing I." This instance is unique by definition and has validity only in its uniqueness ... I can only be identified by the instance of discourse that contains it and by that alone."

You, on the other hand, is defined in this way:

"by introducing the situation of "address," we obtain a symmetrical definition for you as "the individual spoken to in the present instance of discourse containing the linguistic instance of you." These definitions refer to I and you as a category of language and are related to their position in language." — from Problems in General Linguistics

A pivotal concept in Benveniste's work is the distinction between the énoncé and the énonciation, which grew out of his study on pronouns. The énoncé is the statement independent of context, whereas the énonciation is the act of stating as tied to context. In essence, this distinction moved Benveniste to see language itself as a "discursive instance", i.e., fundamentally as discourse. This discourse is, in turn, the actual utilisation, the very enactment, of language.

One of the founders of structuralism, Roland Barthes, attended Benveniste's seminars at École Pratique. Pierre Bourdieu was instrumental in publishing Benveniste's other major work, Vocabulaire des Institutions Indo-Européennes in his series Le Sens commun at radical publisher Les Éditions de Minuit (1969). The title is misleading: it is not a “vocabulary”, but rather a comprehensive and comparative analysis of key social behaviors and institutions across Germanic, Romance-speaking, Greco-Roman, and Indo-Iranian cultures, using the words (vocables) that denote them as points of entry. It makes use of philology, anthropology, phenomenology and sociology. A number of contemporary philosophers (e.g. Giorgio Agamben, Barbara Cassin, Nicole Loraux, Philippe-Joseph Salazar, François Jullien, Marc Crépon) have often referred to Benveniste's Vocabulaire and are inspired by his methodology and the distinction he draws between meaning (signification) and what is referred to (désignation). Jacques Derrida's famous work on "hospitality, the Other, the enemy" is an explicit "gloss" on Benveniste's ground-breaking study of host/hostility/hospitality in the Vocabulary.

== Publications translated to English ==
- 1971: Problems in General Linguistics (Problèmes de linguistique générale, vol. 1, 1966), translated by Mary Elizabeth Meek. Coral Gables, Florida: University of Miami. ISBN 0-87024-132-X.
- 1973: Indo-European language and society (Le Vocabulaire des institutions indo-européennes, 1969), translated by Elizabeth Palmer. London: Faber and Faber. ISBN 0-87024-250-4. Republished as Dictionary of Indo-European Concepts and Society, translated by Elizabeth Palmer. Chicago: HAU Books 2016. ISBN 0-98613-259-4.
- 2018: Last lectures: Collège de France, 1968 and 1969 (Dernières leçons : Collège de France 1968 et 1969, ed. by Jean-Claude Coquet and Irène Fenoglio, 2012), translated by John E. Joseph. Edinburgh: Edinburgh University Press. ISBN 9781474439916.

== Selected works ==
- Vrtra et Vrθragna: Étude de Mythologie Indo-Iranienne, with Louis Renou, Paris: Imprimerie Nationale, 1934.
- Hittite et indo-européen : études comparatives
- Indo-European language and society
- Les infinitifs avestiques
- Langue, discours, société (festschrift for Benveniste, edited by Kristeva et al)
- Origines de la formation des noms en indo-européen
- The Persian religion, according to the chief Greek texts
- Problèmes de linguistique générale (2 vols.)
- Le Vocabulaire des institutions indo-européennes
- Inscriptions de bactriane extraits
- Last lectures: Collège de France, 1968 and 1969

== Sources ==
- Gérard Dessons, Émile Benveniste : L'invention du discours, In Press, 2006. (in French)
