= Journal of Indo-European Studies =

Academic journal

- Discipline: Indo-European studies
- Language: English
- Edited by: Emily Blanchard West

Publication details
- History: 1973–present
- Publisher: Institute for the Study of Man
- Frequency: Quarterly

Standard abbreviations
- ISO 4: J. Indo-Eur. Stud.

Indexing
- ISSN: 0092-2323
- LCCN: 73642748
- OCLC no.: 489056118

Links
- Journal homepage

The Journal of Indo-European Studies (JIES) is a peer-reviewed academic journal of Indo-European studies. The journal publishes papers in the fields of anthropology, archaeology, mythology and linguistics relating to the cultural history of the Indo-European-speaking peoples. It is published every three months. Since 2020, the journal's editor-in-chief is Emily Blanchard West, Associate Professor of Classics and History at St. Catherine University.

It also publishes the Journal of Indo-European Studies Monograph Series. Among the prominent issues were the Proceedings of the Annual UCLA Indo-European Conference from 1995 (the tenth conference) until 2007 (the twentieth conference). This collaboration was discontinued in 2008: today, the proceedings are published by the Buske Verlag.

== History ==
JIES was founded in 1973 by Lithuanian archaeologist and anthropologist Marija Gimbutas, Belgian-American philologist Edgar C. Polomé, Finnish linguist Raimo Aulis Anttila, and British publisher Roger Pearson, and published through Pearson's Institute for the Study of Man.

The collaboration with Roger Pearson, "one of Americas foremost Nazi apologists and quite clearly a racist with one of the worlds [sic] best web of contacts", has sparked some controversy. The Institute for the Study of Man also publishes Mankind Quarterly and the Journal of Social, Political and Economic Studies, known to champion "debunked pseudoanthropological claims of a racial Aryanist diaspora".

Pearson was on the journal's editorial board for many years, which prompted some scholars to boycott the journal. However, In 2002 American psychologist William H. Tucker noted that, unlike Pearson's other publications, editorial control of JIES was left to Gimbutas and Polomé. In this context, Tucker referred to the JIES as "the one publication at the [Institute for the Study of Man] of acknowledged academic value."

In 2017, the journalist Karin Bojs interviewed archaeologist and long-time JIES editor J. P. Mallory on the topic:

Mallory makes it clear to me that he totally disagrees with Pearson’s views, such as the supposed existence of races hypothetically linked to different levels of intelligence. However, he believes democracy should allow researchers to write about crackpot theories, including politically sensitive ones. Moreover, if Pearson did not publish the Journal of Indo-European Studies, who would? Mallory hopes to see one of Pearson’s sons take over soon.

In 2000, American journalists Chip Berlet and Matthew Nemiroff Lyons applied the terms "racialist" and "Aryanist" to the journal, although without giving any specific examples of such content.
