= Rigveda 1.32 =

Poem within the Rigveda (c 1400–1000 BCE)

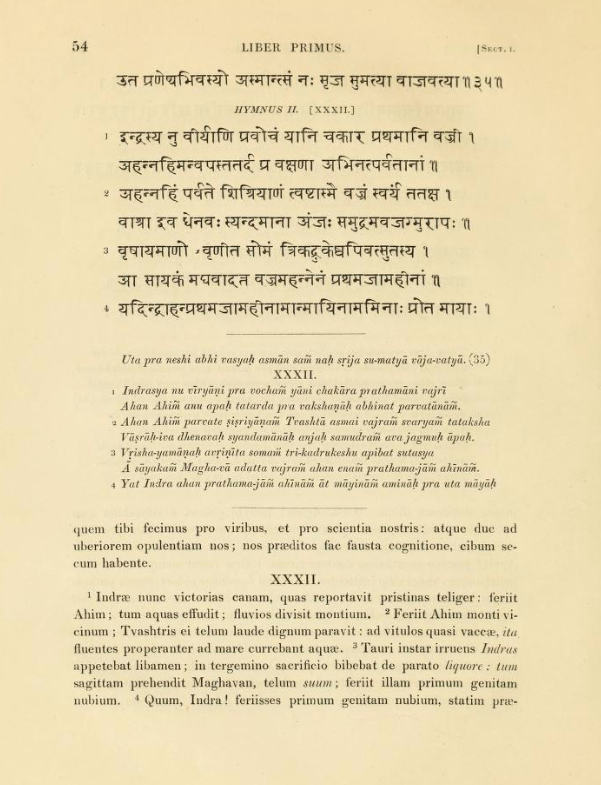
The first printed edition of hymn 1.32 appeared in 1838 along with a Latin translation by Friedrich August Rosen beginning Indræ nunc victorias canam.

Hymn 1.32 of the Rigveda is a poem praising the deity Indra for his victory over the serpent Vritra. While this story is often referred to in the Rigveda, hymn 1.32 is the only detailed description of it. The poem describes in 15 stanzas how Indra smashes Vritra with his mace, thereby liberating the waters. The hymn is rich in similes and has long been valued for its beauty. The linguistic and metrical traits of the poem suggest it was composed relatively late in the Rigveda period. Preserved in mandala 1 of the Rigveda, the hymn is attributed to Hiraṇyastūpa Āṅgirasa, a rishi of the Angiras clan.

== Synopsis ==
Indra's victory over Vritra is a principal feat referred to repeatedly in the Rigveda. However, hymn 1.32 is the only detailed description of it. Even so, the hymn is not a simple linear narrative but circles around and repeatedly returns to the confrontation between Indra and Vritra. The poem consists of 15 stanzas, each of which has 4 lines while each line has 11 syllables. The meter is called triṣṭubh, a common metrical form in the Rigveda.

The first stanza begins with the poet stating that he will "proclaim the manly deeds of Indra" who is called the wielder of the vajra (mace). The Indra-Vritra myth is then presented in a nutshell – Indra slew the serpent, bored out the waters and split the bellies or innards of the mountains. The word used for serpent is áhi- which is also sometimes translated as 'dragon'. The phrase áhann áhim "he slew the serpent" is formulaic, occurring 11 times in the Rigveda and always applied to Indra.

Stanza 2 returns to Indra's "resounding mace", attributing its creation to Tvashtr. Then the poem's first simile appears, the waters which Indra freed from Vritra are like "bellowing milk-cows". The bovine imagery continues in stanza 3 where Indra is compared to a bull. The smashing of Vritra with the mace is further described in stanzas 3 and 4 while stanza 4 also credits Indra for "producing sun, sky, and dawn". Stanza 5 has a simile comparing the defeated Vritra to "a tree-trunk split asunder with an axe". Stanza 6 has a further simile to describe Vritra's defeat:

Like a nonwarrior who can't hold his liquor, he provoked the hard-pressing, lees-quaffing super champion. He did not withstand the onslaught of his weapons. He was crushed for having challenged Indra, his features smashed.

A simile in stanza 7 compares Vritra to a steer going against a bull. Stanzas 8–11 describe the liberation of the waters which Vritra was holding back. The female figure Danu is mentioned and described as the mother of Vritra. Stanzas 12–13 return to a description of the battle but here it is portrayed as more of an even fight, with Vritra attacking Indra with his fangs and other means. Indra is, nevertheless, the victor. This is followed by the puzzling stanza 14, which states that Indra fled after the battle, terrified of a would-be avenger.

Whom did you see, Indra, as the avenger of the serpent when fear came into your heart after you smashed him, and when you crossed over the ninety-nine flowing rivers, like a frightened falcon through the airy realms?

The final stanza 15 extolls Indra as a king over different peoples, like a rim encompassing the spokes of a wheel.

== Dating and authorship ==
The Rigveda hymns in general are dated to approximately 1400–1000 BCE. Edward Vernon Arnold divided the poetry of the Rigveda into five periods, based on metrical and linguistic criteria. He also noted chronological trends in content of the poems, such as mythological narration being characteristic of later poetry. Arnold analyzed 1.32 as a relatively late poem, assigning it to the fourth phase, the "cretic" period.

The Anukramaṇī indices attribute hymn 1.32 to Hiraṇyastūpa Āṅgirasa, a rishi who is also ascribed another hymn to Indra (1.33) as well as several hymns to other deities. The traditional identifications of poets are seen as plausible by some scholars as they correspond to verbal and thematic connections between the hymns. The Āṅgiras seers are a celebrated clan of poets whose hymns are found mainly in mandala 8 and mandala 1 of the Rigveda.

== Reception ==
Hiraṇyastūpa Āṅgirasa's hymns to Indra seem to have long been especially valued. The Aitareya Brahmana says that with hymn 1.32, Hiraṇyastūpa "obtained the favour of Indra" and "gained the highest world". The poem is also valued highly by Western scholars who have praised its enduring beauty and described it as "a fine hymn" and "a poetic masterwork" that is "justly famous".

The hymn has had a variety of functions in the śrauta liturgy, including use at the midday pressing of Soma. Laurie L. Patton comments that its verses "are meant to indicate the power of Soma as a world-conquering drink that releases nothing less than the waters of the world". In the Rig Vidhana, the hymn is indicated for use as a kind of magical incantation:

He who is restrained should mutter Hiraṇyastūpa's hymn [RV 1.32] which is a high praise of Indra's deeds: he pushes against his enemies with very little effort.

The first three stanzas of the hymn are used in hymn 2.5 of the Atharva Veda, an invitation to Indra.

The poem is a part of mandala 1 of the Rigveda which was first published by Friedrich August Rosen in 1838 along with a Latin translation. It has appeared in English as a part of complete translations of the Rig-Veda and in publications of selected hymns as well as in mythological studies. It is frequently referred to in studies of Proto-Indo-European mythology such as How to Kill a Dragon by Calvert Watkins.

== Works cited ==
- Arnold, E. Vernon (1905). Vedic Metre in its Historical Development. Cambridge: Cambridge University Press.
- Aufrecht, Theodor (1877). Die Hymnen des Ṛigveda. Erster Theil. Bonn: Adolph Mareus.
- Bhat, M. S. (1997). Vedic Tantrism. A Study of Ṛgvidhāna of Śaunaka with Text and Translation. Delhi: Motilal Banarsidass. ISBN 8120801970.
- Doniger O'Flaherty, Wendy (1975). Hindu Myths. A Sourcebook Translated from the Sanskrit. Harmondsworth: Penguin Books.
- Doniger O'Flaherty, Wendy (1981). The Rig Veda. An Anthology. London: Penguin Books.
- Eggeling, Julius (1882). The Śatapatha-Brâhmaṇa According to the Text of the Mâdhyandina School. Part 1. Oxford: Oxford University Press.
- Elizarenkova, Tatyana J. (1995). Language and Style of the Vedic Ṛṣis. Albany: State University of New York Press. ISBN 0791416674.
- Griffith, Ralph T. H. (1889). The Hymns of the Rigveda. Benares: E. J. Lazarus and co.
- Griffith, Ralph T. H. (1916). The Hymns of the Atharva-Veda. Vol. 1. Benares: E. J. Lazarus and co.
- Haug, Martin (1863). The Aitareya Brahmanam of the Rigveda. Vol. II. Bombay: Government Central Book Depot.
- Jamison, Stephanie W.; Brereton, Joel P. (2014). The Rigveda. The Earliest Religious Poetry of India. Oxford: Oxford University Press. ISBN 9780199370184.
- Klostermaier, Klaus (1984). Mythologies and Philosophies of Salvation in the Theistic Traditions of India. Waterloo: Canadian Corporation for Studies in Religion. ISBN 0889201587.
- Maurer, Walter H. (1986). Pinnacles of India's Past. Selections from the Ṛgveda. Amsterdam: John Benjamins Publishing Company. ISBN 0915027623.
- Mey, Jacob L. (2002). "The relation between micro- and macropragmatics in modern language studies". In Hansen, Hans Lauge (ed.). Changing Philologies. Contributions to the Redefinition of Foreign Language Studies in the Age of Globalisation. Copenhagen: Museum Tusculanum Press. pp. 89–104. ISBN 8772897902.
- Patton, Laurie L. (2005). Bringing the Gods to Mind. Mantra and Ritual in Early Indian Sacrifice. Berkeley: University of California Press. ISBN 978-0520240872.
- Perry, Edward Delavan [in German] (1885). "Indra in the Rig-Veda". Journal of the American Oriental Society. 11: 117–208. doi:10.2307/592191. JSTOR 592191.
- Puhvel, Jaan (1987). Comparative Mythology. Baltimore: The Johns Hopkins University Press. ISBN 0801839386.
- Rosen, Friedrich August (1838). Rigveda-Sanhita. Liber primus. Sanskritè et latinè. London: The Oriental Translation Fund of Great Britain and Ireland.
- Watkins, Calvert (1987). "How to kill a dragon in Indo-European". In Watkins, C. (ed.). Studies in memory of Warren Cowgill (1929–1985). Berlin: de Gruyter. pp. 270–299.
- Watkins, Calvert (1995). How to Kill a Dragon. Aspects of Indo-European Poetics. New York, Oxford: Oxford University Press.
- West, M. L. (2007). Indo-European Poetry and Myth. Oxford: Oxford University Press.
- Witzel, Michael; Gotō, Toshifumi (2007). Rig-Veda. Erster und zweiter Liederkreis. Frankfurt am Main: Verlag der Weltreligionen.
- Witzel, Michael (2018). "Ṛṣis". Brill’s Encyclopedia of Hinduism Online. Brill.
- Wilson, H. H. (1866). Rig-Veda Sanhitá. London: N. Trübner and co.
