= Indo-European Poetry and Myth =

Non-fiction book on Proto-Indo-European mythology

- Author: Martin L. West
- Language: English
- Subject: Indo-European studies
- Publisher: Oxford University Press
- Publication date: 2007
- Pages: 525

Indo-European Poetry and Myth is a 2007 non-fiction book on comparative Proto-Indo-European mythology by the British philologist and classicist Martin Litchfield West.

Published by Oxford University Press, the book is a work of comparative religion focused on Indo-European literature and religion. Rather than relying solely on linguistic reconstruction, West also examines shared concepts and mythological motifs across the various Indo-European traditions. Like Indogermanische Religion (2025) by Norbert Oettinger and Peter Jackson Rova, it builds on a comparative method of reconstruction previously established by Calvert Watkins in How to Kill a Dragon: Aspects of Indo-European Poetics (1995).

== Reception ==
Anthropologist Manvir Singh, writing in The New Yorker, described it as "the most comprehensive treatment" of Indo-European mythology available in English. American Indologist Wendy Doniger praised it as the "definitive book on Indo-European language and religion" in the London Review of Books.

== Reviews ==
- Nagy, Gregory (2008). "Review of M. L. West, Indo-European Poetry and Myth (Oxford 2007)". Indo-European Studies Bulletin. 13: 60–65. ISSN 1533-9769.
- Nagy, Gregory (2010). "The Origins of Greek Poetic Language - (M.L.) West Indo-European Poetry and Myth. Pp. xiv + 525. Oxford: Oxford University Press, 2007. Cased, £80. ISBN: 978-0-19-928075-9". The Classical Review. 60 (2): 333–338. doi:10.1017/S0009840X1000003X. ISSN 0009-840X.
- Doniger, Wendy (2008-04-10). "The Land East of the Asterisk". London Review of Books. Vol. 30, no. 07. ISSN 0260-9592.

== See also ==
- How to Kill a Dragon (1997), by Calvert Watkins
