= How to Kill a Dragon =

Book by Calvert Watkins

How to Kill a Dragon: Aspects of Indo-European Poetics
- Author: Calvert Watkins
- Language: English
- Subject: Comparative Indo-European poetics
- Genre: Non-fiction
- Published: 1995
- Publisher: Oxford University Press
- Media type: Print
- Pages: 640 pages
- ISBN: 0195085957

How to Kill a Dragon: Aspects of Indo-European Poetics is a 1995 book about comparative Indo-European poetics by the linguist and classicist Calvert Watkins. It was first published on November 16, 1995, through Oxford University Press and is both an introduction to comparative poetics and an investigation of the myths about dragon-slayers found in different times and in different Indo-European languages. Watkins received the 1998 Charles J. Goodwin Award of Merit from the American Philological Association (now the Society for Classical Studies) for his work on the book.

== Synopsis ==
The book consists of seven parts and 59 chapters. Watkins uses the comparative method to find cognate formulas and mythological features that could be traced back to a common past in ancient texts written in Indo-European languages. He claims that it is not possible to understand fully the traditional elements in an early Indo-European poetic text without the background of what he calls a "genetic intertextuality" of particular formulas and themes in all languages of the family.

== Reception ==
Critical reception for the text since its release has been positive. The Classical Journal and the Journal of American Folklore both gave How to Kill a Dragon positive reviews, and The Journal of American Folklore remarked that it was a "landmark book". Journal of the American Oriental Society also praised the book, which they viewed as "a fundamentum which must henceforth serve as the starting point and inspiration for a discipline whose future is now secure."

== See also ==
- Indo-European Poetry and Myth (2007), by Martin Litchfield West
