= Rutgers Preparatory School =

School in Franklin Township, New Jersey, US

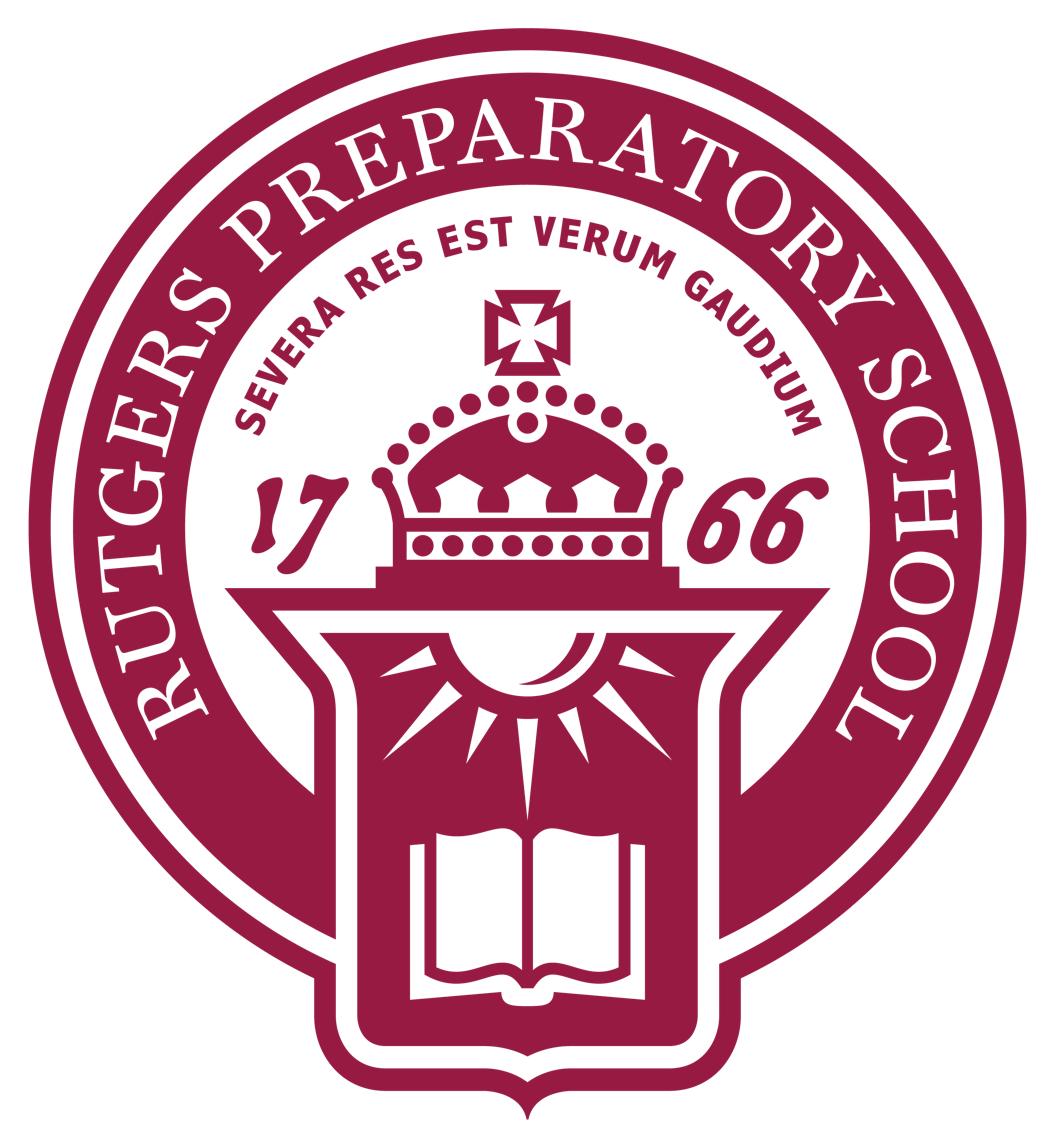

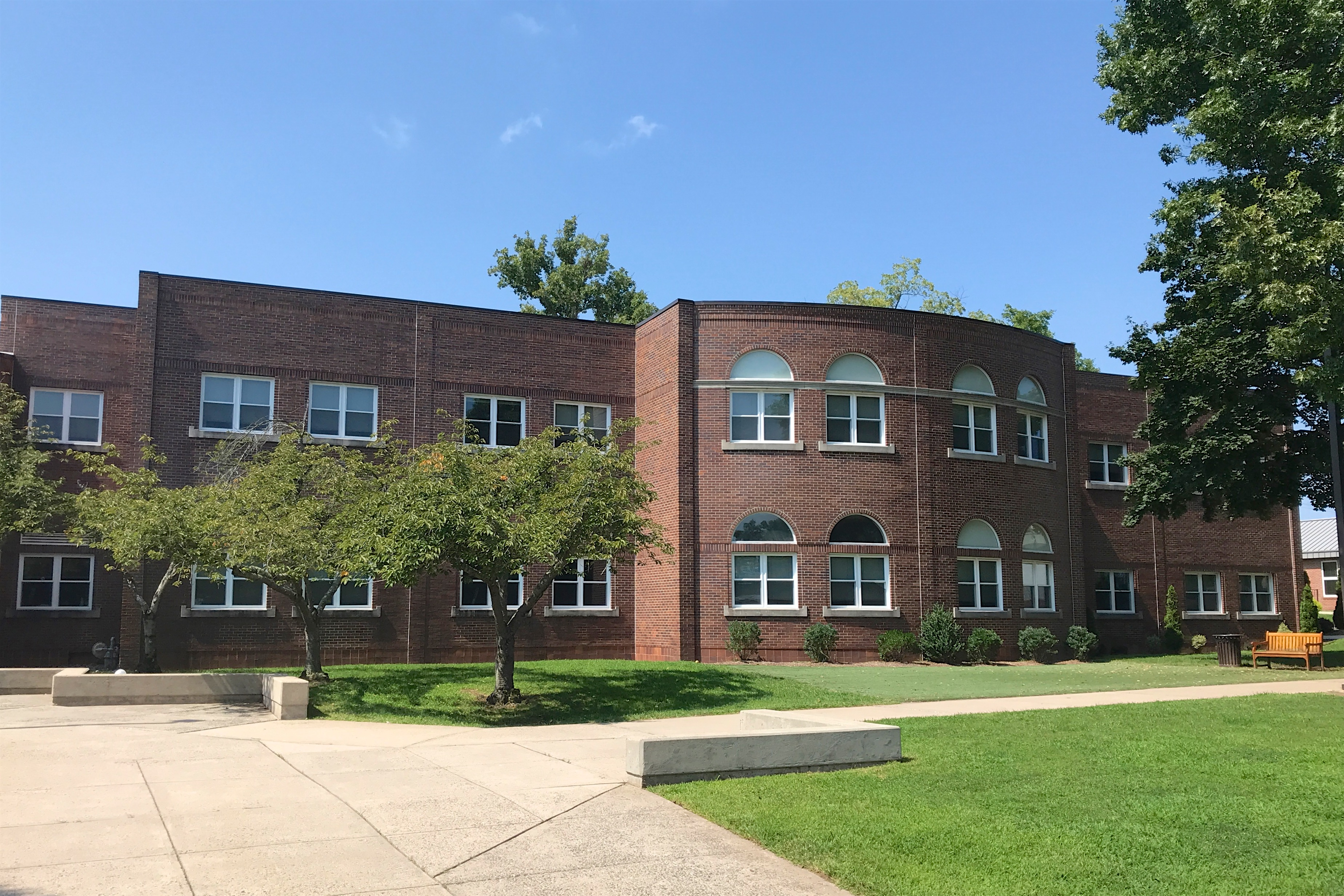

Location
- 1345 Easton Avenue; Somerset, Somerset County, New Jersey 08873; United States; 40.525135°N 74.49627°W

Information
- Type: Independent, Day
- Motto: Severa res est verum gaudium (Hard work is true joy)
- Established: 1766; 260 years ago
- NCES School ID: 00868724
- President: Ana Aymes ’94
- Upper School Principal: Joe Chodl
- Middle School Principal: Stacy McMillen
- Lower School Principal: Namita Tolia
- Head of school: Steven Loy
- Faculty: 85.9 FTEs
- Grades: PreK-12
- Enrollment: 673 (plus 36 in PreK, as of 2023–24)
- Average class size: 19
- Student to teacher ratio: 7.8:1
- Campus: 41 acres (0.17 km^{2})
- Colors: Maroon and white
- Athletics: 21 interscholastic sports
- Athletics conference: Skyland Conference
- Mascot: Argonaut
- Team name: Argonauts
- Accreditation: New Jersey Independent Schools Athletic Association
- National ranking: K-12: #58, Private High Schools: #123, College Prep Private High Schools: #190, High School Diversity: #240, High School STEAM/STEM: #268 High School Athletes: #957. Data according to Niche at www.niche.com/k12/rutgers-preparatory-school-somerset-nj/rankings/
- Publication: Excelsior (literary magazine)
- Newspaper: The Argo
- Yearbook: Ye Dial
- Endowment: $43.5 million
- Budget: $22,000,000
- Tuition: $48,815 (2024–25 for grades 9-12)
- Website: www.rutgersprep.org

Rutgers Preparatory School (also known as Rutgers Prep or RPS) is a private, coeducational, college preparatory day school established in 1766. The school educates students in pre-kindergarten through twelfth grade, located on a 41-acre (0.17 km^{2}) campus along the banks of the Delaware and Raritan Canal in the Somerset section of Franklin Township, in Somerset County, in the U.S. state of New Jersey. Established in 1766, Rutgers Preparatory School is the oldest independent school in the state of New Jersey and the 16th-oldest in the country.

The school has a frequently cited student honor code, and requires its high school students to complete ten hours of community service each school year in order to advance to the next grade level. The vast majority of students take Advanced Placement (AP) courses, and the academic environment at the school is highly competitive. Rutgers Preparatory School is a member of the New Jersey Association of Independent Schools.

As of the 2023–24 school year, the school had an enrollment of 673 students (plus 36 in Pre-K) and 85.9 classroom teachers (on an FTE basis), for a student–teacher ratio of 7.8:1. The school's student body was 43.7% (294) Asian, 34.2% (230) White, 14.4% (97) Black, 4.0% (27) two or more races, 3.4% (294) Hispanic and 0.3% (2) Native Hawaiian / Pacific Islander. Tuition for the 2024–25 school year for grades 9-12 was set at $48,815. The school does not publicly release endowment figures; however IRS filings indicate close to $60 million in investable assets alone.

== History ==
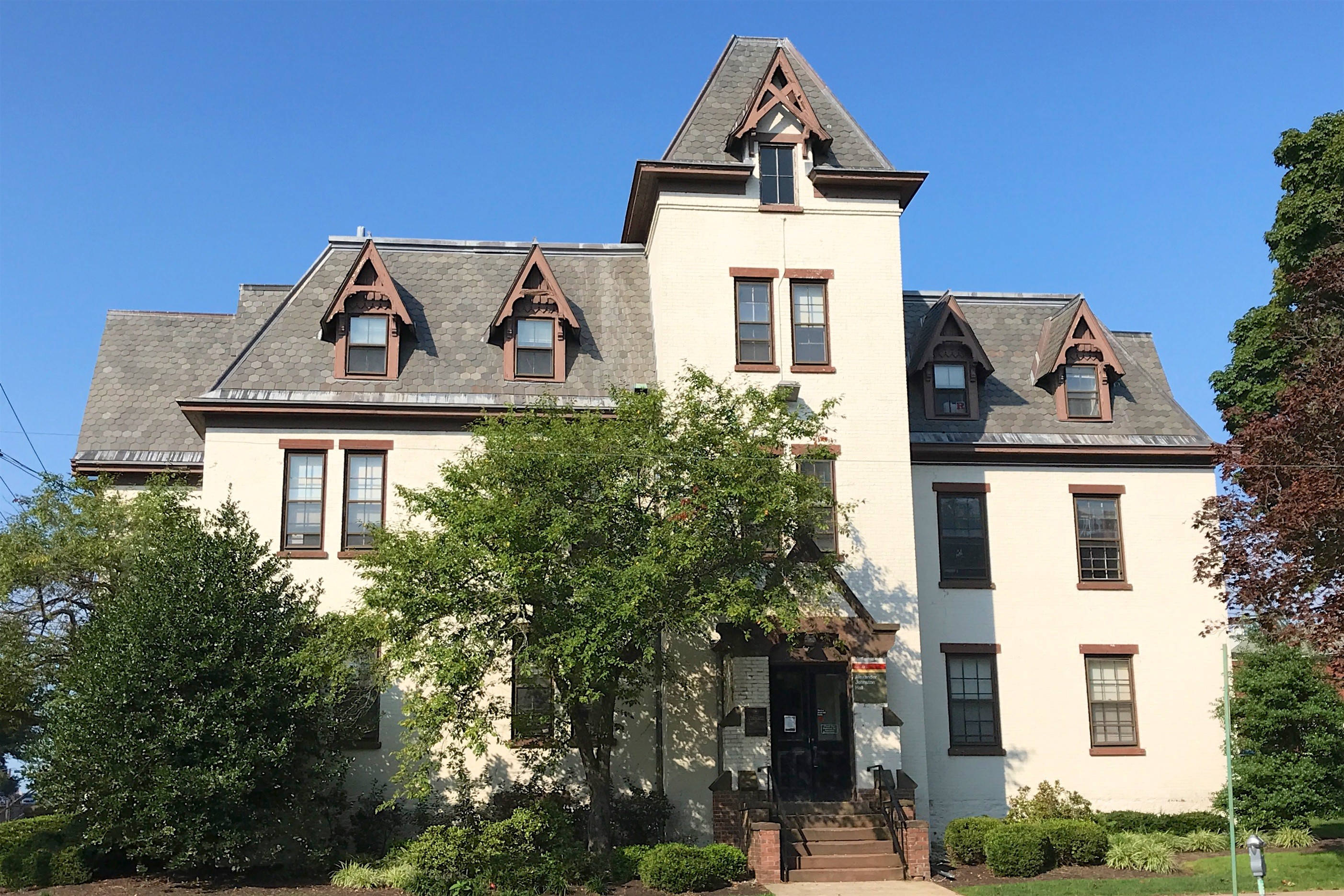
Now known as Alexander Johnston Hall of Rutgers University, this was the original building of Rutgers Preparatory School in New Brunswick

Rutgers Preparatory School is the oldest independent preparatory school in the state of New Jersey. Founded as the Queen's College Grammar School, it was established on November 10, 1766, under the same charter that founded Queen's College (now Rutgers University). It was originally located in New Brunswick.

Instruction began on August 15, 1768, under the school's first master Caleb Cooper, a graduate of the College of New Jersey (now Princeton University). In those early years, instruction of students was carried on in various taverns and boarding houses in New Brunswick. From 1809 to 1830, the grammar school shared the Old Queens building with Queens College (after 1825, Rutgers College) and the New Brunswick Theological Seminary.

In 1825, the trustees renamed the college and grammar school after Colonel Henry Rutgers, whose donation allowed the college to reopen after years of financial difficulties. In 1830, the Rutgers College Grammar School moved to a building designed and constructed by local architect and builder Nicholas Wyckoff, at the corner of College Avenue and Somerset Street. From 1829 until 1963, the school operated at this location. The building is now known as Alexander Johnston Hall and is the second-oldest surviving building on the Rutgers University campus. The Grammar School also included an Elementary School division (now called the Lower School) that was located in its own building nearby on College Avenue.

Though officially nondenominational, the school's original mission was to train young men for the ministry, and its curriculum focused on theology and classical studies. Over the course of the 19th century, however, more modern options were added. During the Progressive Era, Rutgers Preparatory School was among the first schools in the nation to institute a curriculum involving the laboratory sciences, student publications, and community service. Progressive-minded headmasters like Eliot R. Payson (served 1891–1908), Myron T. Scudder (1908–1911) and William P. Kelly (1911–1934) consistently supported the implementation of new educational ideas and methods.

Rutgers Preparatory School opened its doors to international students in the 19th century. In the 1860s, as the Japanese Empire embarked on the reforms of the Meiji Era, several young men from prominent Japanese families enrolled at the school. Notable among them was Matsukata Kōjirō, class of 1884, who later became president of the Kawasaki Dockyard Company and whose art collection served as the nucleus of Japan's National Museum of Western Art. Japanese students continued to attend Rutgers Prep through the early 20th century. Several students from various other regions, particularly Latin America, were also drawn to the school in those years.

Rutgers Prep's lower grades (i.e., 8th grade and below) became coeducational in the 1890s, and have remained so ever since. Coeducation was allowed in the Upper School from 1892 to 1912, during which time some 93 girls were graduated. Coeducation lapsed after 1912, but in 1923 Headmaster William Kelly announced plans to open a girls' school that would operate "as an allied department of the Preparatory School." Seven girls were enrolled, but a lack of support from the community forced Kelly to abandon his plans after only one year.

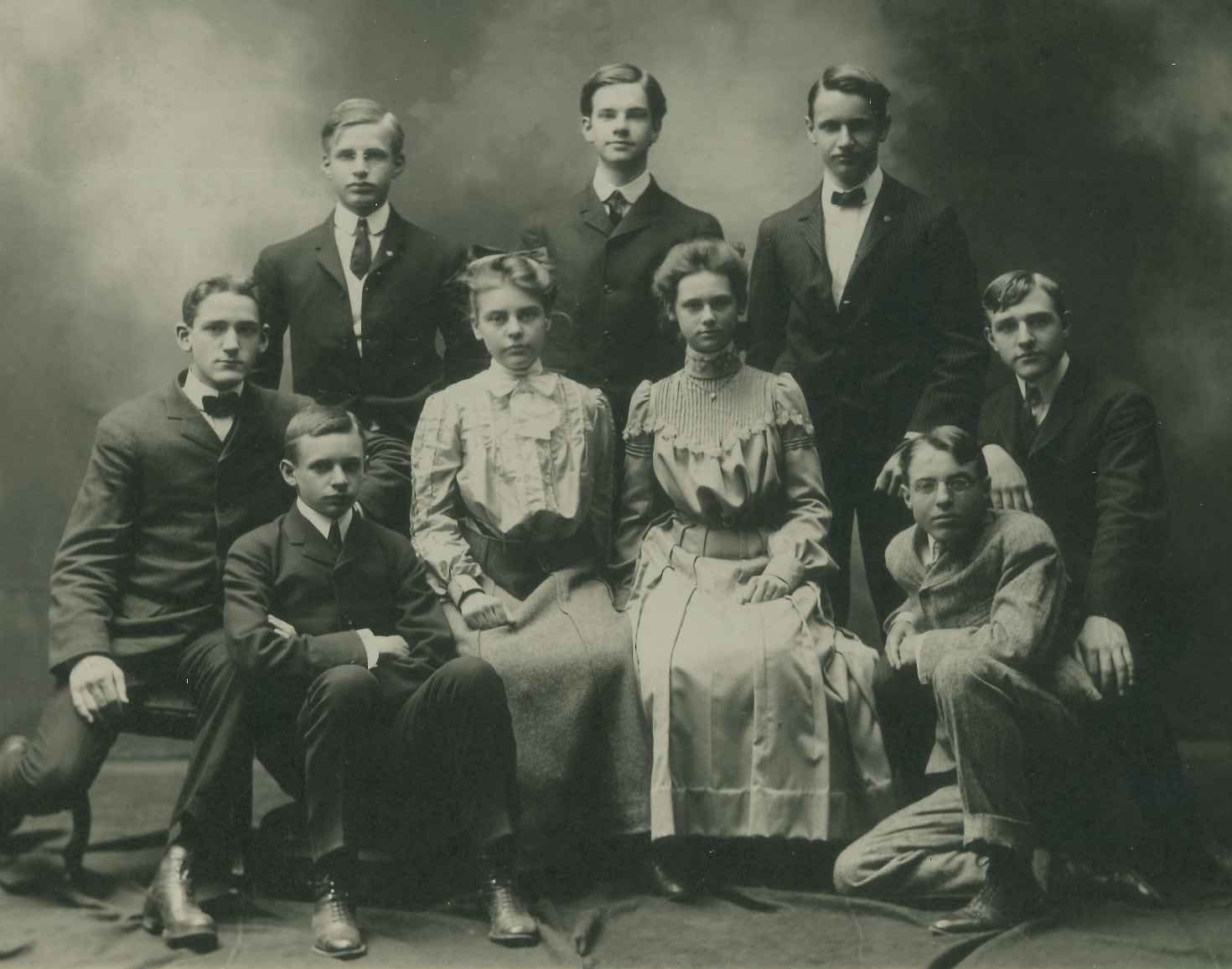
Staff of the Argo, c. 1903. Joyce Kilmer is in the back row center.

Rutgers Preparatory School became fully and permanently coeducational in 1951. That same year, it disbanded its football team and ended its boarding program to become a day school. A shakeup of its faculty resulted in the hiring of several young, highly talented teachers and coaches, most of whom would remain at the school for decades. Notable among them were French teachers Al Gaggini and Helene Spratford, science teacher Gus Daviet, history teacher Frank Sperduto, and athletic director Dick O'Connell. In 1953, Dr. David M. Heinlein became Headmaster. One of his priorities was to increase the economic, ethnic, and gender diversity of the school's students and faculty.

In 1956, as Rutgers University became the State University of New Jersey, the university's board of trustees decided to divest itself of the preparatory school. The school created its own Board of Trustees and Parents Association, and began looking for a new campus outside of New Brunswick. In early 1958, Rutgers Prep purchased the Wells Estate (also known as Elm Farm) in nearby Somerset. The Wells family was eager to sell the property to the school partly because Elm Farm had originally been the home of Abraham Beach, one of Queens College Grammar School's co-founders in the 1760s. By the end of 1958, Rutgers University and Rutgers Preparatory School had officially separated from one another. Rutgers Prep's Lower School began operating at Elm Farm that fall. The Upper School remained in its old quarters in New Brunswick until 1963, when a new upper school building, constructed with the assistance of the Colgate-Palmolive Company, opened at Elm Farm. Since 1963, all divisions of the school have been located on the same campus.

The school expanded rapidly in its new setting. A field house was built in 1968, and, shortly afterward, a center for early childhood education. During the 1960s, the school's curriculum, athletic program, and extracurricular offerings all expanded dramatically.

Despite the economic downturn of the mid-1970s, Rutgers Prep continued to grow. It added a Middle School and a larger library in 1974. Athletic Director O'Connell introduced and vigorously promoted an athletic program for the school's female population. By the end of the 1970s, the school was much larger and more diverse than it had been a generation earlier.

In November 1983, an electrical fire destroyed a large part of the Upper School building. Classes were held in trailers while a new, larger, and more modern Upper School was built. The new building, which is still in use, opened in 1985. During the 1980s, Rutgers Preparatory School also aggressively supported the application of technology to education, creating a computer science department and encouraging computer literacy in all grades.

After Steven Loy became headmaster in 1992, the school began a series of campus expansions funded by a capital campaign. The new construction included a second gymnasium, an art studio, a music building, and a new library shared by all three school divisions. The campus was also fully wired for Internet access.

== Academics ==
Rutgers Preparatory School offers three levels of education: a Lower School serving pre-kindergarten to fifth grade, a Middle School offering grades six to eight and an Upper School offering traditional secondary level education from grades nine to twelve. Students are required to complete twenty course credits in order to graduate, accumulating a minimum of five credits per year, and are to take courses based in a traditional liberal arts curriculum that spans across several academic departments (English, History, Mathematics, Science, World Languages, Art, Computers, Music, and Drama).

The school offers a wide variety of AP (Advanced Placement) courses, which are the high school equivalent of a college-level course. Additionally, the School offers five language courses: Spanish, French, Latin, Chinese, and Arabic. Rutgers Preparatory School has also partnered with the Waksman Institute of Microbiology at Rutgers University, and by participating in its Waksman Student Scholars Program (WSSP), Upper School students are able to participate in, and contribute to, an authentic research project in molecular biology and bioinformatics.

Each student in the Upper School is required to perform a minimum of ten hours of community service during each academic year as a condition for advancing to the next grade level and for graduation. This community-service obligation may be fulfilled either through volunteer work with a non-profit organization, through a charity, or through a service that in some way benefits the school community (tutoring, etc.). In addition, at least five of these hours must be completed outside the school campus.

=== Matriculation ===
The school has a 100% college admissions rate. A majority of the students are given offers of admission to selective public and private universities in the Northeast and throughout the country.

== Institutional awards and recognition ==
Rutgers Preparatory School is accredited by the Middle States Association of Colleges and Schools and was recognized for the 1992–93 school year as a National Blue Ribbon School Award of Excellence by the United States Department of Education.

The school received its most recent accreditation from the New Jersey Association of Independent Schools (NJAIS) in 2012.

The school's delegation was awarded first place in the 2010 Euro Challenge, an international high school economics competition.

In 2014, Rutgers Preparatory School received the Franklin Township Organization Environmental Stewardship Award, in recognition of contributions to the environment of Franklin Township, including participation in the "Rutgers Green Purchasing" and "River-Friendly School Certification" programs, recent construction of a new LEED certified building, new energy management installations, and development of an effective composting and recycling program.

Rutgers Preparatory School is the only school in New Jersey to be a member of the Council of International Schools. It is also the only high school in the world to be granted Non-governmental Organization (NGO) status by the United Nations.

== Campus ==
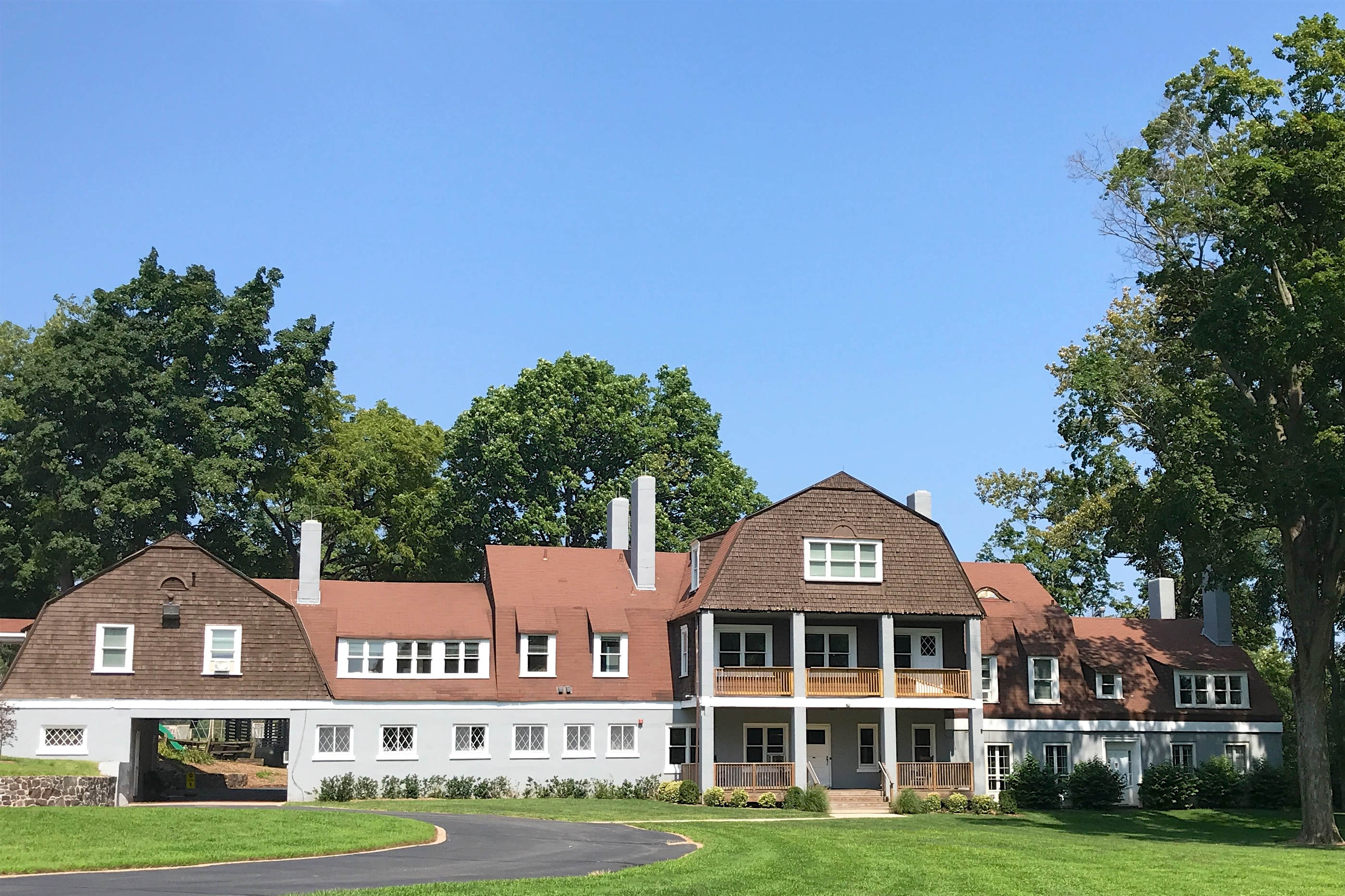
Elm Farm

The 41-acre (170,000 m^{2}) campus is located in Somerset, New Jersey directly on the Delaware and Raritan Canal and the Raritan River. The historic Elm Farm house, built in the mid-18th century, was the home of local minister Abraham Beach, one of the co-founders of the school. Elm Farm was the country estate of the Wells family during the 19th and early 20th centuries. The school purchased it in 1958. Elm Farm now houses administrative offices and several classrooms. The campus includes three full-size athletic fields, a FieldTurf synthetic turf field, a softball field, and a full size baseball field. The "Field House" currently features two full size gyms, male and female locker rooms with showers, a wrestling room, a fitness center, and the offices of the athletic administration and trainer. In addition to the Early Childhood Education Center, and Lower, Middle, and Upper School buildings, an art studio was constructed in 1992 and a new music building was constructed in 2001.

In 2009, the school broke ground on a multimillion-dollar, multi-phased endeavor that includes an expansion of the system of roads and parking on the campus, a widening of Easton Avenue, the addition of new athletic fields and tennis courts, and the construction of an entirely new complex. The first phase of the new complex, which was completed for the 2011–2012 school year, houses the dining commons and several new classrooms on the first floor. The second floor of this new building was completed in Fall 2012, and includes several more upper school classrooms as well as a state-of-the-art all-division room and other multi-use spaces. This new facility is LEED certified.

== Music ==
=== Lower School ===
Students in Lower School Pre-K to 3rd grade partake in music class twice a week for 30 minutes. 4th and 5th graders participate "Musical Performance" class daily. Music Performance classes include Band, Choir, and Orchestra and the student chooses which class they would prefer to take. At the end of the year, 5th and 6th graders also participate in a concert at the end of the year were they show off some of the music they were working on.

=== Middle school ===
Once in Middle School, all students still must take Band, Choir, or Orchestra, but the class only occurs 3 days a week. Middle School students also participate in 2 concerts throughout the year, once in the Winter, and again in the Spring. The Upper School also participates in the concerts with them. Band Choir, and Orchestra all participate in separate concerts. In addition, Middle School band students may also participate in Middle School Jazz Band, which takes place once a week during the study hall period and is invite only.

=== Upper School ===
Once in the Upper School, students are no longer required to take music classes, but they are encouraged to do so. Upper schoolers also have many different options available to them in Upper School music as well. Music classes that Upper School students may take include:

==== Orchestra ====
- Upper School Orchestra
  - No requirements
  - Every day for 30 minutes (9th period)
- Chamber Orchestra
  - Approve by instructor and a minimum for 4 years of experience are required
  - 3 days a week, 2 ether 60–70 minutes, 1 40 minutes

==== Band ====
- Concert Band
  - No requirements
  - Every day for 30 minutes (9th period)
- Brass Ensemble
  - Approval of the instructor, and student must demonstrate a high interest and good skills
  - 3 days a week, 2 ether 60–70 minutes, 1 40 minutes
- Saxophone Ensemble
  - Approval of the instructor, and student must demonstrate a high interest and good skills
  - 3 days a week, 2 ether 60–70 minutes, 1 40 minutes
- Woodwind Ensemble
  - Approval of the instructor, and student must demonstrate a high interest and good skills
  - 3 days a week, 2 ether 60–70 minutes, 1 40 minutes

==== Choir ====
- Concert Choir
  - No requirements
  - Every day for 30 minutes (9th period)
- Madrigals Ensemble (auditioned)
  - Approval from instructor from auditions and enrollment in an additional musical ensemble
  - 3 days a week, 2 ether 60–70 minutes, 1 40 minutes
- Women's Vocal Chamber Ensemble (auditioned)
  - Approval by instructor by auditions or invite
  - 3 days a week, 2 ether 60–70 minutes, 1 40 minutes

==== Music Theory ====
- Music Theory
  - Approval by instructor
  - 3 days a week, 2 ether 60–70 minutes, 1 40 minutes

==== Other Info ====
Since the late 1990s, the Rutgers Preparatory School Madrigal Singers have been attending the New Jersey American Choral Directors Association High School Choral Festival and have regularly received ratings of "Superior." In 2000, 2008 and 2019, the Madrigal Singers performed at Carnegie Hall. In 2013 and 2014 flute players from the school's Music Department performed at Carnegie Hall with Sir James Galway.

== Athletics ==
The Rutgers Prep Argonauts compete as a member school in the Skyland Conference, which is comprised of public and private high schools covering Hunterdon County, Somerset County and Warren County and operates under the auspices of the New Jersey State Interscholastic Athletic Association (NJSIAA). The athletic program fields 44 high school and middle school teams, including 15 varsity athletic teams. Boys' teams include soccer, basketball, baseball, tennis, lacrosse, wrestling, and cross country. Girls' teams consist of soccer, basketball, softball, volleyball, cross country, tennis and lacrosse. Additionally, the school has two co-ed teams: golf and swimming. Rutgers Prep is a member of the NJSIAA Non-Public B, NJISAA Prep B, and Skyland Conferences.

Rutgers Prep also had a no-cut policy, meaning that students who want to participate are guaranteed to make a team, but still have no guarantee on receiving playing time.

=== NJSIAA state champions ===
- Baseball - 2013 (won Non-Public B title vs. Morris Catholic High School)
- Boys lacrosse - won Non-Public B title in 2013 (defeating Immaculata High School in the title game) and 2022 (vs. Montclair Kimberley Academy)
- Girls basketball - won the Non-Public Group B state title in 2016 (defeating Saddle River Day School in the tournament final), 2017 (vs. Queen of Peace High School) and 2022 (vs. Saddle River Day School)
- Girls soccer - 2019 (won the Non-Public Group B state championship against runner-up Saddle River Day School).
- Boys Cross Country – 1990, 1996
- Girls Cross Country – 1997, 2002
- Boys Basketball – 1956, 1972, 1979, 1981, 1986, 1987, 1988, 1991, 2005, 2009, 2011, 2012
- Girls Basketball – 1992, 1997, 2001, 2003, 2004, 2006, 2007, 2008, 2009, 2011, 2012
- Volleyball – 1992, 2002, 2005, 2011
- Wrestling – 1993, 1999, 2000, 2001, 2002, 2003, 2004, 2005, 2007, 2009
- Swimming – 1991, 2001
- Boys Lacrosse – 1988, 1989, 1990, 2009, 2010, 2013, 2019, 2022
- Girls Lacrosse – 1986, 1999, 2002
- Golf – 1987
- Baseball – 1988, 2011, 2012, 2016, 2019
- Softball – 1988, 2005, 2007, 2008, 2009, 2010
- Boys Tennis – 2001, 2002, 2004
- Girls Tennis – 2000
- Girls Soccer – 2004, 2005, 2006, 2007, 2008, 2019, 2022, 2023, 2024

=== NJSIAA sectional championships ===
- Baseball – 2013
- Girls Basketball - 2016, 2017, 2018
- Boys Tennis - 2018
- Boys Soccer - 2018
- Girls Soccer - 2019, 2022, 2023, 2024
- Girls Tennis - 2025

=== Somerset County Championships ===
- Boys Tennis – 2001
- Boys Basketball - 1979, 1981, 1983
- Girls Basketball – 2004, 2008, 2011, 2015, 2016, 2017
- Baseball - 2017
- Girls Soccer - 2023, 2024, 2025

=== Patriot Conference Championships (1985 and later) ===
- Boys Cross Country – 1986, 1990, 1995, 1996
- Girls Cross Country – 1996, 1997, 1998
- Boys Lacrosse – 2006, 2007, 2008, 2009, 2010
- Girls Soccer - 2004, 2006
- Boys Basketball – 1985, 1986, 1987, 1988, 1989, 1990, 1992, 1995, 2004, 2005, 2009
- Girls Basketball – 1997, 2001, 2002, 2003, 2004, 2005, 2006, 2007, 2008, 2009
- Volleyball – 1992, 1996, 1997, 1998, 1999, 2002, 2003, 2004, 2005, 2006, 2007, 2008, 2009
- Wrestling – 1994, 1995, 1996,1997, 1998, 1999, 2000, 2001, 2002, 2003, 2004, 2005, 2007
- Golf – 1996, 1998, 2010
- Boys Tennis – 2001, 2003, 2004
- Baseball – 2002, 2003, 2004, 2005, 2006, 2008
- Softball – 2000, 2005, 2007, 2008, 2009, 2010

=== Skyland Conference Championships ===
- Boys Basketball - Delaware Division - 2015
- Boys Tennis - Valley Division - 2015, 2016, 2017, 2019
- Girls Soccer - 2019
- Girls Tennis - Mountain Division - 2018
- Volleyball - Raritan Division -2015
- Girls Basketball -Raritan Division - 2016, 2017, 2018, 2019
- Boys Cross Country - Mountain Division - 2017, 2018
- Girls Cross Country - Mountain Division - 2017, 2018
- Girls Soccer - Mountain Division - 2017
- Baseball - Mountain Division - 2019

In recent years, student-athletes have been awarded individual honors including:

- All-American
- All-State
- All-Metro Region
- All- Prep B
- All- Prep
- All-Somerset County
- All-Area
- All-Non-Public
- Player of the Year
- All-Skyland Conference

== Student publications ==
- The Argo — Award-winning monthly newspaper
- Excelsior — biannual literary magazine
- Ye Dial — school yearbook

== Notable alumni ==
- Marvadene Anderson (born 1993), basketball player
- Jesús Arango Cano (1915–2015), Colombian economist, diplomat, anthropologist, archaeologist and writer
- James Bishop (1816–1895), politician who represented New Jersey's 3rd congressional district in the United States House of Representatives from 1855 to 1857
- Mikayla Blakes (born 2005), basketball player
- James Dickson Carr (1868–1920), Assistant District Attorney, New York County (1899–1901)
- Leilani Correa (born 2001), basketball player
- William Henry Steele Demarest (1863–1956), Minister, President of Rutgers College (1906–1924) and President of the New Brunswick Theological Seminary (1924–1934)
- Fred A. Hartley Jr. (1902–1969), member of the United States House of Representatives who sponsored the Taft–Hartley Act
- Robert Wood Johnson II (1893–1968), chairman of Johnson & Johnson
- Stanley Kamel (1943–2008), actor who appeared on the television series Monk
- Aline Murray Kilmer (1888–1941), poet and author
- Joyce Kilmer (1886–1918), poet and World War I soldier
- Keshia Knight Pulliam (born 1979), actress who appeared on the television series The Cosby Show
- Leroy Lins (1913–1986), professional basketball player who played for the Akron Goodyear Wingfoots in the National Basketball League
- Kōjirō Matsukata (1865–1950), son of Japanese Prime Minister Matsukata Masayoshi and future director of Kawasaki Dockyard Company
- Judy Melick (born 1954, class of 1972), former competition swimmer who participated as part of the U.S. team at the 1972 Summer Olympics
- Zach Perez (born 1996), professional soccer player who plays as a defender for USL League One club Richmond Kickers
- Max Raab (1926–2008), film producer who made his initial fortune in the garment industry
- Manvir Singh (born 1990, class of 2008), anthropologist and contributing writer for The New Yorker
- Marc Turtletaub (born 1946, class of 1963), film producer
- Breein Tyree (born 1998, transferred), point guard / shooting guard for the Ole Miss Rebels men's basketball team
- Constance H. Williams (born 1944), politician who served from 2001 to 2009 in the Pennsylvania State Senate

== See also ==
- Queens Campus, Rutgers University
- History of Rutgers University
- Rutgers University
- Rutgers Prep Twitter
- Rutgers Prep Instagram
