= Edward Vernon Arnold =

British Indologist and Classical scholar (1857–1926)

- Born: 18 July 1857; South Norwood
- Died: 19 September 1926 (aged 69)
- Occupations: Indologist and Classical scholar
- Notable work: Vedic grammar; Vedic metre; Roman stoicism

Edward Vernon Arnold (18 July 1857 – 19 September 1926) was a British Indologist and classical scholar. His most important work was a mathematically-based study of the internal chronology of the hymns of the Rigveda.

== Education ==
After attending Westminster School he studied at the University of Cambridge (Trinity College), graduating in 1879 (B.A., 1st class Classical and Mathematical Triposes; M.A. 1882) then at the University of Tübingen (under the Sanskrit scholar Rudolf von Roth).

== Career ==
A fellow of Trinity College, Cambridge, from 1884 to 1924 he was Professor of Latin at the University College of North Wales in Bangor. He was awarded Litt.D. at Cambridge in 1907, and Hon. D.Litt. at Manchester University in 1919. In addition to his work on Vedic Sanskrit, he published a number of textbooks on Classical studies, most notably on the pedagogical pronunciation of Latin and Greek, and on Roman Stoicism.

Arnold was involved in Welsh protests against the Armenian massacres of 1894 to 1896 by Turkish troops, editing a newspaper titled Wales and Armenia – Cymru unllais.

== Arnold's work on Vedic grammar and metre ==
Arnold's study of Vedic Sanskrit grammar appeared in 1897. However, his most important work was on the internal chronology of the hymns of the Rigveda, culminating in his book Vedic Metre in its Historical Development. In the opinion of Stephanie W. Jamison "The most important attempt at a complete chronology is that of Arnold 1905, based primarily on metrical criteria". In the opinion of Philipp Kubisch "the stanza and verse types of the Rgveda (RV) have been described in detail for the first time by Hermann Oldenberg in ... his Die Hymnen des Rigveda (1888: 1–190) and even more comprehensively by Edward Vernon Arnold in his monograph Vedic Metre in its Historical Development (1905)". The importance of Arnold's mathematical approach to the study of metre is pointed out by Saul Migron: "Unfortunately, our task is rendered difficult by the state of our knowledge in Rgvedic metrics. E. V. Arnold's Vedic Metre of 1905 is usually made the basis of our pronouncements – with perfect justice, since in it the data are presented with computer-like accuracy". Arthur Berriedale Keith wrote in 1906 "Every student of Vedic chronology owes a great debt to the labour expended by Dr. Arnold on the collection of materials to determine the chronological sequence of the several parts of the Rgveda".

== Family ==
Arnold was a son of the Reverend Charles Maddock Arnold, Vicar of Saint Mark’s, South Norwood. He married Violet Osborn in 1894. They had two daughters and three sons.

== Selected publications ==
- Arnold, Edward Vernon (1897). "Historical Vedic Grammar (Sketch of the historical grammar of the Rig and Atharva Vedas)". Journal of the American Oriental Society. 18:2: 203–354.
  - Reprint: Historical Vedic Grammar. New Haven, Connecticut: The American Oriental Society, 1897. Google Books.
- Arnold, Edward Vernon (1905). Vedic Metre in its Historical Development. Cambridge University Press.
- Arnold, E. V. and Conway, R. S. (1908) The Restored Pronunciation of Greek and Latin, 4th edition. Cambridge University Press.
- Arnold, Edward Vernon (1911). Roman Stoicism; being lectures on the history of the Stoic philosophy with special reference to its development within the Roman Empire. Cambridge University Press.
- Arnold, E. V. (1912) Cothvrnvlvs: Three Short Latin Historical Plays for the Use of Beginners. London: G. Bell.
