= Martin Litchfield West =

British philologist and classical scholar (1937–2015)

Martin Litchfield West OM FBA
- Born: 23 September 1937; London, England
- Died: 13 July 2015 (aged 77); Oxford, England
- Education: Balliol College, Oxford
- Occupations: Professor, academic and author
- Known for: Classics scholar
- Spouse: Stephanie Pickard (m. 1960)
- Honours: Order of Merit (2014)

Martin Litchfield West, OM, FBA (23 September 1937 – 13 July 2015) was a British philologist and classical scholar. In recognition of his contribution to scholarship, he was appointed to the Order of Merit in 2014.

West wrote on ancient Greek music, Greek tragedy, Greek lyric poetry, the relations between Greece and the ancient Near East, and the connection between shamanism and early ancient Greek religion, including the Orphic tradition. This work stems from material in Akkadian, Phoenician, Hebrew, Hittite, and Ugaritic, as well as Greek and Latin. West also studied the reconstitution of Indo-European mythology and poetry and its influence on Ancient Greece, notably in the 2007 book Indo-European Poetry and Myth (IEPM).

West also produced an edition of Homer's Iliad for the Bibliotheca Teubneriana, accompanied by a study of its critical tradition and overall philology entitled Studies in the Text and Transmission of the Iliad. A further volume on The Making of the Iliad appeared ten years later, and one on The Making of the Odyssey was published in 2014.

== Life and career ==
=== Early life and education ===
Martin Litchfield West was born on 23 September 1937 at Eltham General Hospital (Eltham, London), the elder child (there being a younger daughter, Dr Jennifer Bywaters) of civil engineer Maurice Charles West and Catherine Baker, née Stainthorpe. His parents lived at that time in Orpington, but moved in 1939 to Hampton, where his father was appointed resident engineer at the Metropolitan Water Board-operated waterworks. West's father's family were from the Home Counties, and his mother's family from Yorkshire and Durham. His paternal grandfather, Robert West, lectured in electrical engineering; his maternal grandfather, John Stainthorpe, was a railwayman from Pickering. Litchfield was the maiden name of his paternal grandmother.

Aged four, West entered the private preparatory school of Denmead. At 11, he lost a scholarship at Colet Court (now St Paul's Juniors), but was offered a feepaying place instead. West discovered at Colet his interest in languages and invented at 14 a competitor of Esperanto he labelled 'Unilingua'. In 1951, he won a scholarship to the main school, St Paul's. Excelling at both linguistics and mathematics, he was advanced to the 'Upper Eighth' and sat for a scholarship to Balliol College a year early. His tutors included Donald Russell, Michael Stokes and Russell Meiggs. Among his peers were future Nobel Prize winner Anthony J. Leggett, and future Permanent Secretary Peter Gregson.

=== Career ===
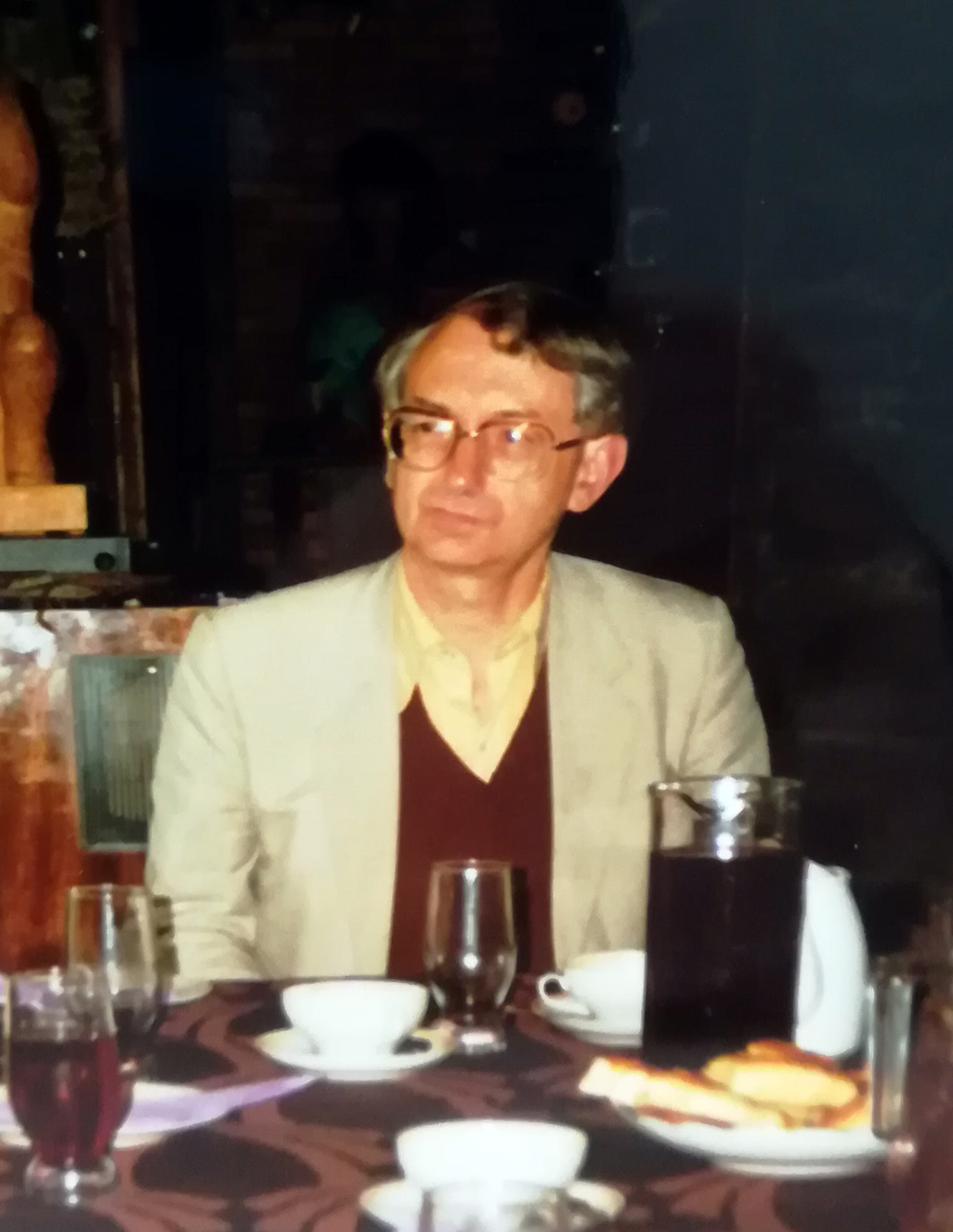
West on a visit to Estonia in September 1996

West married fellow scholar Stephanie Pickard in 1960 at Nottingham, after meeting her at a lecture given by Eduard Fraenkel at Corpus Christi College, Oxford, whose seminars he attended. He became a junior research fellow at St John's College from 1960 to 1963. His doctoral thesis, a commentary on Hesiod's Theogony, won the Conington Prize for the best classical dissertation of the year in 1965, and was edited as a printed book the following year.

From the mid-sixties, West took especial interest in the relation of Greek literature to the Orient, and over several decades, culminating in his masterpiece The East Face of Helicon (1997), defended his view that Greek literature derives significant influences and inspiration from Near Eastern literature. He took up a position as tutorial fellow at University College, a position he filled from 1963 to 1974. In 1973 he became the second youngest person to be elected a Fellow of the British Academy, at the age of 35. He obtained a chair at Royal Holloway and Bedford New College, which he held from 1974 until 1991, when he became a fellow of All Souls College. West retired formally in 2004, but remained active in All Souls until the end of his life.

=== Death ===
West died of a heart attack in 2015 in Oxford at the age of 77. Fellow Oxford academic Armand D'Angour paid tribute to him as "a man of few words in seven languages".

== Works ==
West edited and commented on Hesiod's Theogony and Works and Days. In 1967, he published with Reinhold Merkelbach Fragmenta Hesiodea, an edition containing other fragmentary poems attributed to Hesiod. He also edited a book on the fragments of the Hesiodic Catalogue of Women. West edited Homer's Iliad and Odyssey for the Bibliotheca Teubneriana, and the Homeric Hymns for the Loeb Classical Library.

== Awards and honours ==
- 2000: Balzan Prize for Classical Antiquity
- 2002: Kenyon Medal for Classical Studies from the British Academy
- 2007: A book of essays on ancient Greek literature written for West on his 70th birthday

West was a DPhil and DLitt of Oxford University, and was elected a Fellow of the British Academy, a Corresponding Member of the Akademie der Wissenschaften, Göttingen, and a Member of the Academia Europaea, London. Queen Elizabeth II appointed him a Member of the Order of Merit (OM) in the 2014 New Year Honours.

== Academic teaching and research history ==
- Emeritus Fellow, All Souls College, Oxford (since 2004)
- Senior Research Fellow, All Souls College, Oxford (1991–2004)
- Professor of Greek, University of London (Bedford College, later Royal Holloway and Bedford New College) (1974–91)
- Fellow and Praelector in Classics, University College, Oxford (1963–74)
- Jr. Woodhouse Research Fellow, St. John's College, Oxford (1960–63)

== Selected bibliography ==
=== Monographs ===
- Early Greek Philosophy and the Orient, Oxford: Clarendon Press 1971, xv + 256 pp.; translation into Italian, Bologna 1993
- Textual Criticism and Editorial Technique Applicable to Greek and Latin Texts (Teubner Studienbücher), Stuttgart: B.G. Teubner 1973, 155 pp.; translation into Greek, Athens 1989; translation into Italian, Palermo 1991; translation into Hungarian, Budapest 1999
- Studies in Greek Elegy and Iambus (Untersuchungen zur antiken Literatur und Geschichte 14), Berlin, New York: Walter de Gruyter 1974, ix + 198 pp. ISBN 978-3-110-04585-7.
- Immortal Helen: an inaugural lecture delivered on 30 April 1975, London: Bedford College 1975, 18 pp. ISBN 0-900145-30-7
- Greek Metre, Oxford 1982, xiv + 208 pp. ISBN 0-19-814018-5
- The Orphic Poems, Oxford: Clarendon Press 1983, xii + 275 pp. ISBN 0-19-814854-2; translation into Italian, Naples 1993;
- The Hesiodic Catalogue of Women: Its Nature, Structure, and Origins, Oxford: Clarendon Press 1985, viii + 193 pp. ISBN 0-19-814034-7
- Introduction to Greek Metre, Oxford: Clarendon Press 1987, xi + 90 pp. ISBN 0-19-872132-3
- Studies in Aeschylus (Beiträge zur Altertumskunde 1), Stuttgart: B.G. Teubner 1990, x + 406 pp. ISBN 3-519-07450-8
- Ancient Greek Music, Oxford: Clarendon Press 1992, xiii + 410 pp ISBN 0-19-814897-6; translation into Greek, Athens 1999
- Die griechische Dichterin: Bild und Rolle (Lectio Teubneriana v), Stuttgart & Leipzig: B.G. Teubner 1996, 48 pp. ISBN 3-519-07554-7
- The East Face of Helicon: West Asiatic Elements in Greek Poetry and Myth, Oxford: Clarendon Press 1997, xxvi + 662 pp. ISBN 0-19-815042-3
- Studies in the text and transmission of the Iliad. München: K.G. Saur 2001 304 pp. ISBN 3-598-73005-5
- Indo-European Poetry and Myth. Oxford: Oxford University Press, 2007 480 pp. ISBN 978-0-19-928075-9
- The Making of the Iliad: Disquisition and Analytical Commentary. Oxford: Oxford University Press 2011 441 pp. ISBN 978-0-199-59007-0
- The Epic Cycle: A Commentary on the Lost Troy Epics, Oxford University Press 2013. ISBN 9780199662258
- The Making of the 'Odyssey', Oxford University Press 2014. ISBN 978-0-198-71836-9

=== Editions, commentaries and translations ===
- Hesiod, Theogony, ed. with prolegomena and commentary by M. L. West, Oxford: Clarendon Press 1966, xiii + 459 pp. ISBN 0-19-814169-6.
- Fragmenta Hesiodea, ed.: R. Merkelbach et M. L. West, Oxford: Clarendon Press 1967, 236 pp.
- Iambi et elegi Graeci ante Alexandrum cantati. 1 : Archilochus. Hipponax. Theognidea, ed. M. L. West, Oxford: Clarendon Press 1971, revised edition 1989, xvi + 256
- Iambi et elegi Graeci ante Alexandrum cantati. 2 : Callinus. Mimnermus. Semonides. Solon. Tyrtaeus. Minora adespota, ed. M. L. West, Oxford: Clarendon Press 1972, revised edition 1992 x + 246 pp.
- Sing me, goddess. Being the first recitation of Homer's Iliad, translated by Martin West, London: Duckworth 1971, 43 pp. ISBN 0-7156-0595-X
- Theognidis et Phocylidis fragmenta et adespota quaedam gnomica, ed. M. L. West (Kleine Texte für Vorlesungen und Übungen 192), Berlin: Walter de Gruyter 1978, iv + 49 pp.
- Hesiod, Works and Days, ed. with prolegomena and commentary by M.L. West, Oxford: Clarendon Press 1978, xiii + 399 pp.
- Delectus ex Iambis et Elegis Graecis, ed. M. L. West, Oxford: Clarendon Press 1980, ix + 295 pp. ISBN 0-19-814589-6
- Carmina Anacreontea, edidit Martin L. West (Bibliotheca scriptorum Graecorum et Romanorum Teubneriana), Leipzig: Teubner 1984, xxvi + 64 pp.; corrected reprint with one page of Addenda, 1993 ISBN 3-8154-1025-8
- Euripides, Orestes, ed. with transl. and commentary by M. L. West, Warminster: Aris & Phillips 1987, ix + 297 pp. ISBN 0-85668-310-8
- Hesiod, Theogony, and Works and Days, transl. and with an introduction by M. L. West, Oxford: Oxford University Press 1988, xxv + 79 pp. ISBN 0-19-281788-4
- Aeschyli Tragoediae cum incerti poetae Prometheo, recensuit Martin L. West (Bibliotheca scriptorum Graecorum et Romanorum Teubneriana), Stuttgart: B.G. Teubner 1990, lxxxv + 508 pp. ISBN 3-519-01013-5
- Greek Lyric Poetry. The poems and fragments of the Greek iambic, elegiac, and melic poets (excluding Pindar and Bacchylides) down to 450 B.C., [verse translation] Oxford: Oxford university Press 1993, xxv + 213 pp. ISBN 0-19-282360-4
- Homeri Ilias. Volumen prius rhapsodias I-XII continens, recensuit Martin L. West (Bibliotheca scriptorum Graecorum et Romanorum Teubneriana), Stuttgart & Leipzig: B.G. Teubner 1998, lxii + 372 pp. ISBN 3-519-01431-9
- Homeri Ilias. Volumen alterum rhapsodias XIII-XXIV continens, recensuit Martin L. West (Bibliotheca scriptorum Graecorum et Romanorum Teubneriana), K. G. Saur: Leipzig & Munich 2000, vii + 396 pp.
- Homeric Hymns, Homeric Apocrypha, Lives of Homer, edited and translated by Martin L. West. (The Loeb Classical Library 496) Cambridge, Massachusetts: Harvard University Press 2003 ISBN 0-674-99606-2
- Greek Epic Fragments from the Seventh to the Fifth Centuries BC, edited and translated by Martin L. West (The Loeb Classical Library 497). London Cambridge, Massachusetts: Harvard University Press 2003 ISBN 0-674-99605-4
- Barrett, W. S., Greek Lyric, Tragedy, and Textual Criticism: Collected Papers, ed. M. L. West (Oxford & New York, 2007): papers dealing with Stesichorus, Pindar, Bacchylides and Euripides
- The Hymns of Zoroaster: A New Translation of the Most Ancient Sacred Texts of Iran, Leiden, 2010.
- Old Avestan Syntax and Stylistics: With an Edition of the Texts, Berlin: De Gruyter, 2011.
- Homerus, Odyssea, ed. M. L. West, (Bibliotheca scriptorum Graecorum et Romanorum Teubneriana), De Gruyter: Berlin 2017 (posthumous)

=== Articles ===
His works also include contributions to dictionaries and books and more than 200 articles and papers since 1960.

- West, M. L. (1960). "Anaxagoras and the Meteorite of 467 B.C.". Journal of the British Astronomical Association. 70 (8): 45–46.
- West, M. L. (1961). "An Ancient Reference to the Quadrantids". Journal of the British Astronomical Association. 71 (5): 104.
- West, M. L. (1961). "Alleged Apparitions of Halley's Comet in the Eighteenth Century B.C. and Earlier". Journal of the British Astronomical Association. 71 (7): 324–326.
- West, M. L. (1961). "Hesiodea". The Classical Quarterly. 11 (2): 130–145. doi:10.1017/S0009838800015469. ISSN 0009-8388. JSTOR 637705. S2CID 246875859.
- West, M. L. (1964). "Two Versions of 'Jabberwocky'". Greece & Rome. 11 (2): 185–187. doi:10.1017/S0017383500014236. ISSN 0017-3835. JSTOR 642244. S2CID 162986660.
- West, M. L. (1964). "The Medieval and Renaissance Manuscripts of Hesiod's Theogony". The Classical Quarterly. 14 (2): 165–189. doi:10.1017/S0009838800023739. ISSN 0009-8388. JSTOR 637722. S2CID 171014323.
- West, Martin L. (1966). "Conjectures on 46 Greek Poets". Philologus. 110 (1–2): 147–168. doi:10.1524/phil.1966.110.12.147. ISSN 0031-7985. S2CID 164267981.
- West, M. L. (1967). "The Contest of Homer and Hesiod". The Classical Quarterly. 17 (2): 433–450. doi:10.1017/S0009838800028548. ISSN 0009-8388. JSTOR 638018. S2CID 170296593.
- West, Martin L. (1968). "Lidell and Scott". Gnomon. 40 (2): 224. ISSN 0017-1417. JSTOR 27684419.
- West, M. L. (1968). "Notes on the Orphic Hymns". The Classical Quarterly. 18 (2): 288–296. doi:10.1017/S0009838800022126. ISSN 0009-8388. JSTOR 638072. S2CID 170274576.
- West, M. L. (1969). "Near Eastern Material in Hellenistic and Roman Literature". Harvard Studies in Classical Philology. 73: 113–134. doi:10.2307/311152. ISSN 0073-0688. JSTOR 311152.
- West, M. L. (1970). "Note: Hesiod, Fragmenta, Again". The Classical Review. 20 (3): 416. doi:10.1017/S0009840X00227972. ISSN 0009-840X. JSTOR 706397. S2CID 220338675.
- West, M. L. (1971). "Note on a Note". The Journal of Hellenic Studies. 91: 143. doi:10.2307/631383. ISSN 0075-4269. JSTOR 631383. S2CID 161692272.
- West, M. L. (1971). "Stesichorus". The Classical Quarterly. 21 (2): 302–314. doi:10.1017/S0009838800033450. ISSN 0009-8388. JSTOR 637783. S2CID 246878823.
- West, M. L. (1971). "The Cosmology of 'Hippocrates', De Hebdomadibus". The Classical Quarterly. 21 (2): 365–388. doi:10.1017/S0009838800033504. ISSN 0009-8388. JSTOR 637788. PMID 11620550. S2CID 536245.
- West, M. L. (1973). "Indo-European Metre". Glotta. 51 (3/4): 161–187. ISSN 0017-1298. JSTOR 40266268.
- West, M. L. (1973). "Greek Poetry 2000-700 B. C.". The Classical Quarterly. 23 (2): 179–192. doi:10.1017/S0009838800036648. ISSN 0009-8388. JSTOR 638170. S2CID 170581047.
- West, M. L. (1974). "The Medieval Manuscripts of the Works and Days". The Classical Quarterly. 24 (2): 161–185. doi:10.1017/S0009838800032717. ISSN 0009-8388. JSTOR 638479. S2CID 170161908.
- West, M. L. (1978). "Stesichorus at Lille". Zeitschrift für Papyrologie und Epigraphik. 29: 1–4. ISSN 0084-5388. JSTOR 20181538.
- West, M. L. (1979). "Four Hellenistic First Lines Restored". The Classical Quarterly. 29 (2): 324–326. doi:10.1017/S0009838800035953. ISSN 0009-8388. JSTOR 638099. S2CID 170219390.
- West, M. L. (1979). "The Prometheus Trilogy". The Journal of Hellenic Studies. 99: 130–148. doi:10.2307/630637. ISSN 0075-4269. JSTOR 630637. S2CID 161700684.
- West, M. L. (1982). "Three Topics in Greek Metre". The Classical Quarterly. 32 (2): 281–297. doi:10.1017/S0009838800026458. ISSN 0009-8388. JSTOR 638567. S2CID 170738420.
- West, M. L. (1984). "Problems in the Anacreontea". The Classical Quarterly. 34 (1): 206–221. doi:10.1017/S000983880002944X. ISSN 0009-8388. JSTOR 638350. S2CID 170444118.
- West, M. L. (1985). "Hesiod's Titans". The Journal of Hellenic Studies. 105: 174–175. doi:10.2307/631535. ISSN 0075-4269. JSTOR 631535. S2CID 164115755.
- West, M. L. (1988). "The Rise of the Greek Epic". The Journal of Hellenic Studies. 108: 151–172. doi:10.2307/632637. ISSN 0075-4269. JSTOR 632637. S2CID 162976726.
- West, M. L. (1990). "Notes on Sappho and Alcaeus". Zeitschrift für Papyrologie und Epigraphik. 80: 1–8. ISSN 0084-5388. JSTOR 20187195.
- West, M. L. (1992). "Analecta Musica". Zeitschrift für Papyrologie und Epigraphik. 92: 1–54. ISSN 0084-5388. JSTOR 20188688.
- West, M. L. (1993). "Simonides Redivivus". Zeitschrift für Papyrologie und Epigraphik. 98: 1–14. ISSN 0084-5388. JSTOR 20188914.
- West, M. L. (1994). "Some Oriental Motifs in Archilochus". Zeitschrift für Papyrologie und Epigraphik. 102: 1–5. ISSN 0084-5388. JSTOR 20189117.
- West, M. L. (1994). "The Babylonian Musical Notation and the Hurrian Melodic Texts". Music & Letters. 75 (2): 161–179. doi:10.1093/ml/75.2.161. ISSN 0027-4224. JSTOR 737674.
- West, M. L. (1994). "Ab ovo: Orpheus, Sanchuniathon, and the Origins of the Ionian World Model". The Classical Quarterly. 44 (2): 289–307. doi:10.1017/S0009838800043767. ISSN 0009-8388. JSTOR 639634. S2CID 246879701.
- West, Martin L. (1995). "The Date of the "Iliad"". Museum Helveticum. 52 (4): 203–219. ISSN 0027-4054. JSTOR 24819564.
- West, M. L. (1997). "Akkadian poetry: metre and performance". IRAQ. 59: 175–187. doi:10.1017/S0021088900003405. ISSN 0021-0889.
- West, M. L. (1999). "The Invention of Homer". The Classical Quarterly. 49 (2): 364–382. doi:10.1093/cq/49.2.364. ISSN 0009-8388. JSTOR 639863.
- West, Martin L. (2000). "The Name of Aphrodite". Glotta. 76 (1/2): 134–138. ISSN 0017-1298. JSTOR 40267103.
- West, Martin L. (2001). "Some Homeric Words". Glotta. 77 (1/2): 118–135. ISSN 0017-1298. JSTOR 40262722.
- West, Martin L. (2010). "Rhapsodes at Festivals". Zeitschrift für Papyrologie und Epigraphik. 173: 1–13. ISSN 0084-5388. JSTOR 20756824.
- West, Martin L. (2014). "Nine Poems of Sappho". Zeitschrift für Papyrologie und Epigraphik. 191: 1–12. ISSN 0084-5388. JSTOR 43909573.

== See also ==
- Lille Stesichorus

== Notes ==
=== Bibliography ===
- Fowler, Robert (2018). "Martin Litchfield West" (PDF). Biographical Memoirs of Fellows of the British Academy. XVII: 89–120.
- Gibert, John (23 June 2008). "Review of Finglass, Collard & Richardson 2007". Bryn Mawr Classical Review. 2008.06.23.
- Lightfoot, Jane L. (13 August 2015). "Martin West obituary". The Guardian.
- Lightfoot, Jane. L. (2019). "West, Martin Litchfield (1937–2015), Greek scholar, textual critic, and philologist". Oxford Dictionary of National Biography. doi:10.1093/odnb/9780198614128.013.109926. ISBN 978-0-19861-412-8.
- Finglass, P. J.; Collard, C.; Richardson, N. J., eds. (2007). Hesperos: Studies in Ancient Greek Poetry. Oxford University Press. ISBN 978-0-19-928568-6.
- Staff (21 July 2015). "Professor Martin West, OM". The Telegraph.
