= Shamanism =

Religious practice

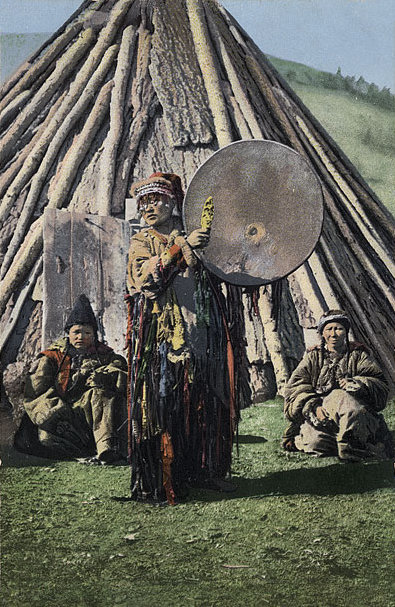
Russian postcard based on a photo taken in 1908 by S. I. Borisov, showing a female shaman of probable Khakas ethnicity

Shamanism is a spiritual practice that involves a practitioner (shaman) interacting with the spirit world through altered states of consciousness, such as trance. The goal of this is usually to direct spirits or spiritual energies into the physical world for the purpose of healing, divination, or to aid human beings in some other way.

Beliefs and practices categorized as shamanic have attracted the interest of scholars from a variety of disciplines, including anthropologists, archeologists, historians, religious studies scholars, philosophers, and psychologists. Hundreds of books and academic papers on the subject have been produced, with a peer-reviewed academic journal being devoted to the study of shamanism.

== Terminology ==
=== Etymology ===
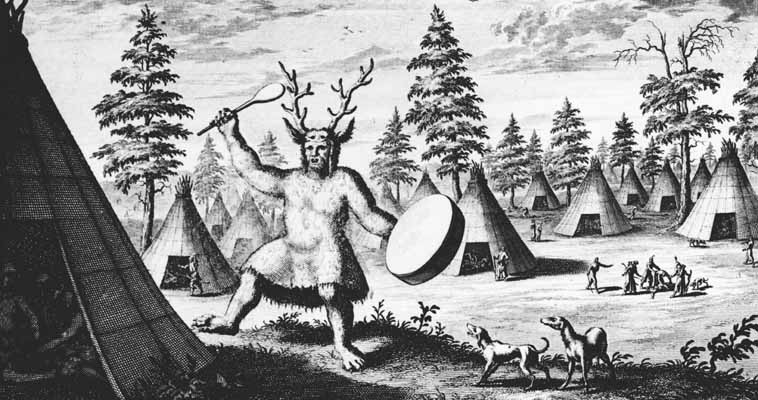
The earliest known depiction of a Siberian shaman, by the Dutch explorer Nicolaes Witsen, 17th century. Witsen called him a "priest of the Devil" and drew clawed feet for the supposed demonic qualities.

The Modern English word shamanism derives from the Russian word шаман, šamán, which itself comes from the word samān from a Tungusic language – possibly from the southwestern dialect of the Evenki spoken by the Sym Evenki peoples, or from the Manchu language. The etymology of the word is sometimes connected to the Tungus root sā-, meaning "to know". However, Finnish ethnolinguist Juha Janhunen questions this connection on linguistic grounds: "The possibility cannot be completely rejected, but neither should it be accepted without reservation since the assumed derivational relationship is phonologically irregular (note especially the vowel quantities)."

Mircea Eliade noted that the Sanskrit word श्रमण, śramaṇa, designating a wandering monastic or holy figure, has spread to many Central Asian languages along with Buddhism and could be the ultimate origin of the word shaman. The word has been reported in Gandhari as ṣamana, in Tocharian A as ṣāmaṃ, in Tocharian B as ṣamāne and in Chinese as 沙門, shāmén.

The term was adopted by Russians interacting with the indigenous peoples in Siberia. It is found in the memoirs of the exiled Russian churchman Avvakum. It was brought to Western Europe twenty years later by the Dutch statesman Nicolaes Witsen, who reported his stay and journeys among the Tungusic- and Samoyedic-speaking Indigenous peoples of Siberia in his book Noord en Oost Tataryen (1692). Adam Brand, a merchant from Lübeck, published in 1698 his account of a Russian embassy to China; a translation of his book, published the same year, introduced the word shaman to English speakers.

Anthropologist and archeologist Silvia Tomášková argued that by the mid-1600s, many Europeans applied the Arabic term shaitan (meaning "devil") to the non-Christian practices and beliefs of Indigenous peoples beyond the Ural Mountains. alongside the term shaman, which she suggests was equally non-indigenous but some mongrelized but originally Slavic foreignism created by Europeans.

A female shaman is sometimes called a shamanka, which is not an actual Tungus term but simply shaman plus the Russian suffix -ka (for feminine nouns).

=== Definitions ===
There is no single agreed-upon definition for the word "shamanism" among anthropologists. Anthropologist Manvir Singh argues that the most justifiable definition includes three basic features: entering non-ordinary states, engaging with unseen realities, and providing services like healing and divination.

The English historian Ronald Hutton noted that by the dawn of the 21st century, there were four separate definitions of the term which appeared to be in use:

1. To refer to "anybody who contacts a spirit world while in an altered state of consciousness".
2. Those who contact a spirit world while in an altered state of consciousness at the behest of others.
3. In an attempt to distinguish shamans from other magico-religious specialists who are believed to contact spirits, such as "mediums", "witch doctors", "spiritual healers" or "prophets", this definition suggests that shamans undertake some particular technique not used by the others. However, scholars advocating the third view have failed to agree on what the defining technique should be.
4. "Shamanism" referring to the Indigenous religions of Siberia and neighboring parts of Asia.

According to the Oxford English Dictionary, a shaman (/ˈʃɑːmən/ SHAH-mən, /ˈʃæmən/ SHAM-ən or /ˈʃeɪmən/ SHAY-mən) is someone who is regarded as having access to, and influence in, the world of benevolent and malevolent spirits, who typically enters into a trance state during a ritual, and practices divination and healing. The word "shaman" probably originates from the Tungusic Evenki language of North Asia. According to Juha Janhunen, "the word is attested in all of the Tungusic idioms" such as Negidal, Lamut, Udehe/Orochi, Nanai, Ilcha, Orok, Manchu and Ulcha, and "nothing seems to contradict the assumption that the meaning 'shaman' also derives from Proto-Tungusic" and may have roots that extend back in time at least two millennia.

The term "shamanism" was first applied by Western anthropologists as outside observers of the ancient religion of indigenous Siberians , as well as those of the neighbouring Tungusic- and Samoyedic-speaking peoples. Upon observing more religious traditions around the world, some Western anthropologists began to also use the term in a very broad sense. The term was used to describe unrelated religious practices found within the ethnic religions of other parts of Asia, Africa, Australasia and even completely unrelated parts of the Americas, as they believed these practices to be similar to one another. While the term has been incorrectly applied by cultural outsiders to many Indigenous spiritual practices, the words "shaman" and "shamanism" do not accurately describe the variety and complexity that is Indigenous spirituality. Each nation and tribe has its own way of life, and uses terms in their own languages.

Mircea Eliade writes, "A first definition of this complex phenomenon, and perhaps the least hazardous, will be: shamanism = 'technique of religious ecstasy'." Shamanism encompasses the premise that shamans are intermediaries or messengers between the human world and the spirit worlds. Shamans are said to treat ailments and illnesses by mending the soul. Alleviating traumas affecting the soul or spirit are believed to restore the physical body of the individual to balance and wholeness. Shamans also say that they enter supernatural realms or dimensions to obtain solutions to problems afflicting the community, or visit other worlds or dimensions to bring guidance to misguided souls and to ameliorate illnesses of the human soul caused by foreign elements. Shamans operate primarily within the spiritual world, which, they believe, in turn affects the human world. The restoration of balance is said to result in the elimination of the ailment.

=== Criticism of the term ===
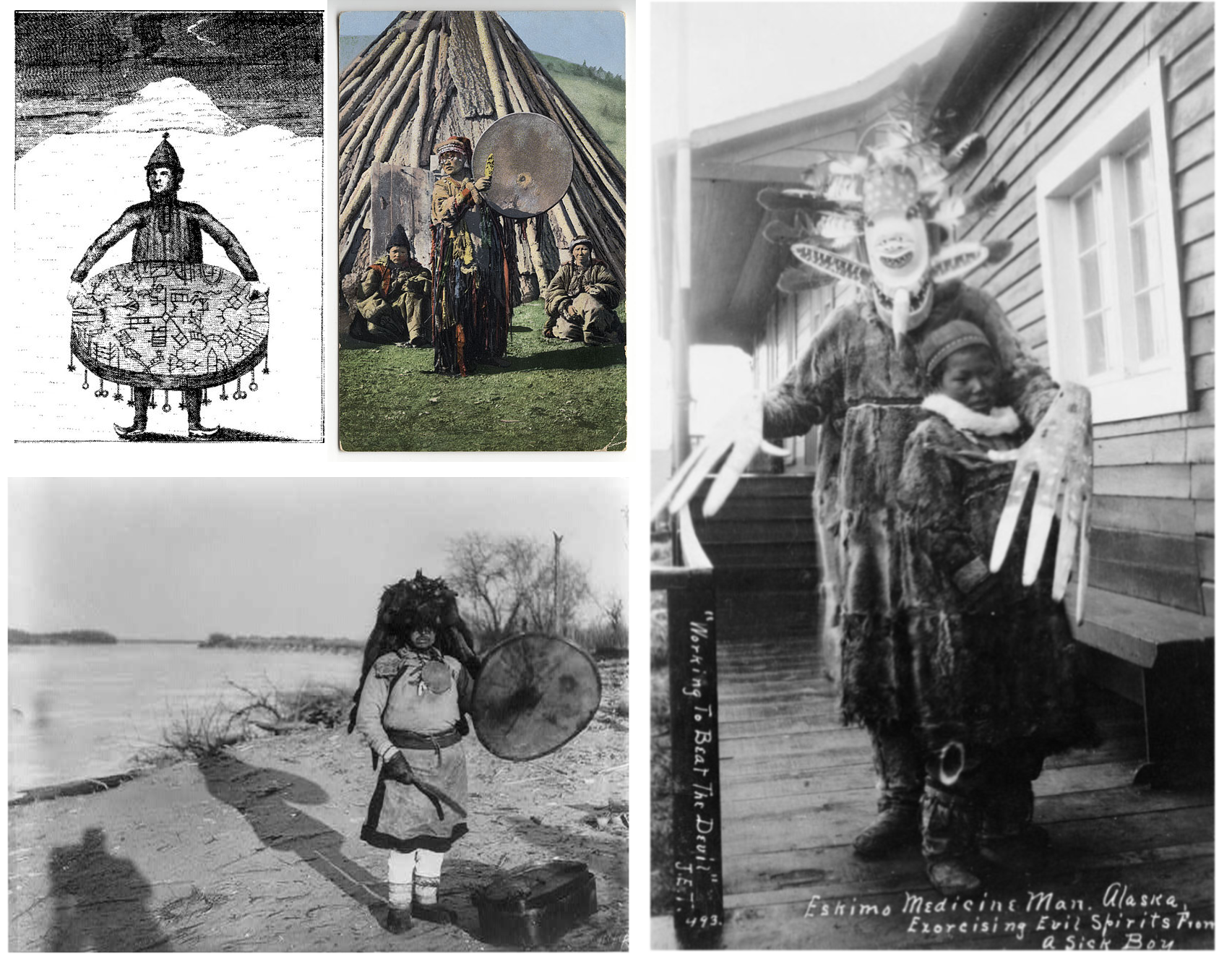
A tableau presenting figures from various cultures described as "shamans" in Western academic literature.

The anthropologist Alice Kehoe criticizes the term "shaman" in her book Shamans and Religion: An Anthropological Exploration in Critical Thinking. Part of this criticism involves the notion of cultural appropriation. This includes criticism of New Age and modern Western forms of shamanism, which, according to Kehoe, misrepresent or dilute Indigenous practices. Kehoe also believes that the term reinforces racist ideas such as the noble savage.

Kehoe is highly critical of Mircea Eliade's work on shamanism as an invention synthesized from various sources unsupported by more direct research. To Kehoe, citing practices such as drumming, trance, chanting, entheogen and hallucinogen use, spirit communication, and healing as definitive of shamanism ignores the fact that they exist outside of what is defined as shamanism and even play similar roles in nonshamanic cultures, for example chanting in the Abrahamic religions. She argues that these expressions are unique to each culture that uses them and that such practices cannot be generalized easily, accurately, or usefully into a global religion of shamanism. Because of this, Kehoe is also highly critical of the hypothesis that shamanism is an ancient, unchanged, and surviving religion from the Paleolithic period.

Anthropologist Mihály Hoppál claims that for many readers "-ism" implies a particular dogma, like Buddhism, Catholicism or Judaism. He recommends using the term "shamanhood" or "shamanship" (a term used in old Russian and German ethnographic reports at the beginning of the 20th century) for stressing the diversity and the specific features of the discussed cultures. He believes that this places more stress on the local variations and emphasizes that shamanism is not a religion of sacred dogmas, but linked to the everyday life in a practical way. Following similar thoughts, he also conjectures a contemporary paradigm shift. Piers Vitebsky also claims that despite really astonishing similarities, there is no unity in shamanism. The various, fragmented shamanistic practices and beliefs coexist with other beliefs everywhere. There is no record of pure shamanistic societies (although their existence is not impossible). Norwegian social anthropologist Hakan Rydving has likewise argued for the abandonment of the terms "shaman" and "shamanism" as "scientific illusions".

Dulam Bumochir has affirmed the above critiques of "shamanism" as a Western construct created for comparative purposes and, in an extensive article, has documented the role of Mongols themselves, particularly "the partnership of scholars and shamans in the reconstruction of shamanism" in post-1990/post-communist Mongolia. This process has also been documented by Swiss anthropologist Judith Hangartner in her landmark study of Darhad shamans in Mongolia. Historian Karena Kollmar-Polenz argues that the social construction and reification of shamanism as a religious "other" actually began with the 18th-century writings of Tibetan Buddhist monks in Mongolia and later "probably influenced the formation of European discourse on Shamanism".

== History ==
Shamanism is a system of religious practice. Historically, it is often associated with Indigenous and tribal societies, and involves belief that shamans, with a connection to the otherworld, have the power to heal the sick, communicate with spirits, and escort souls of the dead to the afterlife. The origins of Shamanism stem from Mongolia and indigenous peoples of far northern Europe and Siberia.

Despite structural implications of colonialism and imperialism that have limited the ability of Indigenous peoples to practice traditional spiritualities, many communities are undergoing resurgence through self-determination and the reclamation of dynamic traditions. Other groups have been able to avoid some of these structural impediments by virtue of their isolation, such as the nomadic Tuvan (with an estimated population of 3000 people surviving from this tribe). Tuva is one of the most isolated Asiatic tribes in Russia where the art of shamanism has been preserved until today due to its isolated existence, allowing it to be free from the influences of other major religions.

== Beliefs ==
Bonda "disari" (shaman) Sukra Dhangdamajhi shares his shamanic practices in the Bonda language

There are many variations of shamanism throughout the world, but several common beliefs are shared by all forms of shamanism. Common beliefs identified by Eliade (1972) are the following:

- Spirits exist and they play important roles both in individual lives and in human society
- The shaman can communicate with the spirit world
- Spirits can be benevolent or malevolent
- The shaman can treat sickness caused by malevolent spirits
- The shaman can employ trances inducing techniques to incite visionary ecstasy and go on vision quests
- The shaman's spirit can leave the body to enter the supernatural world to search for answers
- The shaman evokes animal images as spirit guides, omens, and message-bearers
- The shaman can perform other varied forms of divination, scry, throw bones, and sometimes foretell of future events

Shamanism is based on the premise that the visible world is pervaded by invisible forces or spirits which affect the lives of the living. Although the causes of disease lie in the spiritual realm, inspired by malicious spirits, both spiritual and physical methods are used to heal. Commonly, a shaman "enters the body" of the patient to confront the spiritual infirmity and heals by banishing the infectious spirit.

Many shamans have expert knowledge of medicinal plants native to their area, and an herbal treatment is often prescribed. In many places shamans learn directly from the plants, harnessing their effects and healing properties, after obtaining permission from the indwelling or patron spirits. In the Peruvian Amazon Basin, shamans and curanderos use medicine songs called icaros to evoke spirits. Before a spirit can be summoned it must teach the shaman its song. The use of totemic items such as rocks with special powers and an animating spirit is common.

Belief in witchcraft and sorcery, known as brujería in Latin America, exists in many societies. Other societies assert all shamans have the power to both cure and kill. Those with shamanic knowledge usually enjoy great power and prestige in the community, but they may also be regarded suspiciously or fearfully as potentially harmful to others.

=== Soul and spirit concepts ===
Soul
Soul can generally explain more, seemingly unassociated phenomena in shamanism:

Healing
Healing may be based closely on the soul concepts of the belief system of the people served by the shaman. It may consist of the supposed retrieving the lost soul of the ill person.

Scarcity of hunted game
Scarcity of hunted game can be solved by "releasing" the souls of the animals from their hidden abodes. Besides that, many taboos may prescribe the behavior of people towards game, so that the souls of the animals do not feel angry or hurt, or the pleased soul of the already killed prey can tell the other, still living animals, that they can allow themselves to be caught and killed.

Spirits
Spirits are invisible entities that only shamans can see. They are seen as persons that can assume a human or animal body. Some animals in their physical forms are also seen as spirits such as the case of the eagle, snake, jaguar, and rat. Beliefs related to spirits can explain many different phenomena. For example, the importance of storytelling, or acting as a singer, can be understood better if the whole belief system is examined. A person who can memorize long texts or songs, and play an instrument, may be regarded as the beneficiary of contact with the spirits (e.g. Khanty people).

== Practice ==
Generally, shamans traverse the axis mundi and enter the "spirit world" by effecting a transition of consciousness, entering into an ecstatic trance, either autohypnotically or through the use of entheogens or ritual performances. The methods employed are diverse, and are often used together.

=== Music and songs ===
Just like shamanism itself, music and songs related to it in various cultures are diverse. In several instances, songs related to shamanism are intended to imitate natural sounds, via onomatopoeia.

Sound mimesis in various cultures may serve other functions not necessarily related to shamanism: practical goals such as luring game in the hunt; or entertainment (Inuit throat singing).

=== Initiation and learning ===
Shamans often say that they have been called through dreams or signs. However, some say their powers are inherited. In traditional societies shamanic training varies in length, but generally takes years.

Turner and colleagues mention a phenomenon called "shamanistic initiatory crisis", a rite of passage for shamans-to-be, commonly involving physical illness or psychological crisis. The significant role of initiatory illnesses in the calling of a shaman can be found in the case history of Chuonnasuan, who was one of the last shamans among the Tungus peoples in Northeast China.

The wounded healer is an archetype for a shamanic trial and journey. This process is important to young shamans. They undergo a type of sickness that pushes them to the brink of death. This is said to happen for two reasons:

- The shaman crosses over to the underworld. This happens so the shaman can venture to its depths to bring back vital information for the sick and the tribe.
- The shaman must become sick to understand sickness. When the shaman overcomes their own sickness, they believe that they will hold the cure to heal all that suffer.

=== Items used in spiritual practice ===
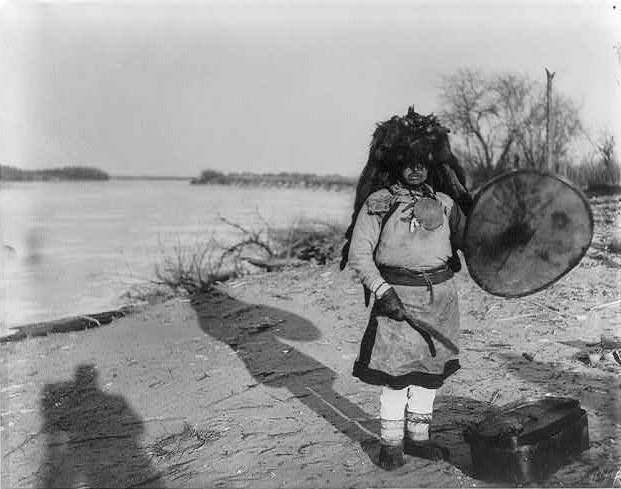
Goldes shaman priest in his regalia

Shamans may employ varying materials in spiritual practice in different cultures.

The drum is used by shamans of several peoples in Siberia. The beating of the drum allows the shaman to achieve an altered state of consciousness or to travel on a journey between the physical and spiritual worlds. Much fascination surrounds the role that the acoustics of the drum play to the shaman. Shaman drums are generally constructed of an animal-skin stretched over a bent wooden hoop, with a handle across the hoop.

== Roles ==
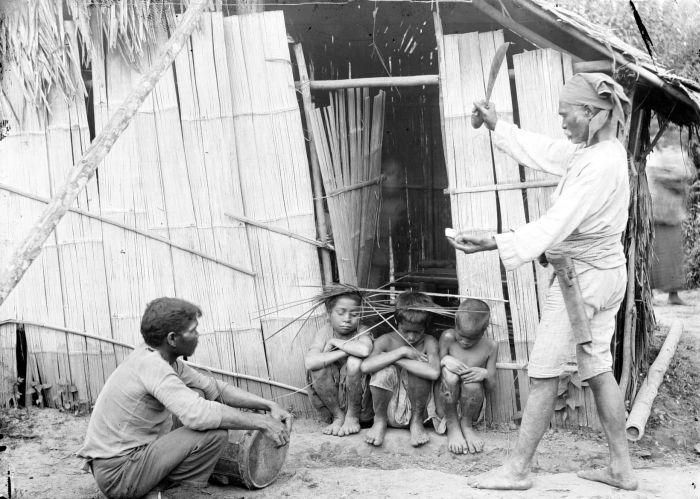
South Moluccan shaman in an exorcism ritual involving children, Buru, Indonesia (1920)

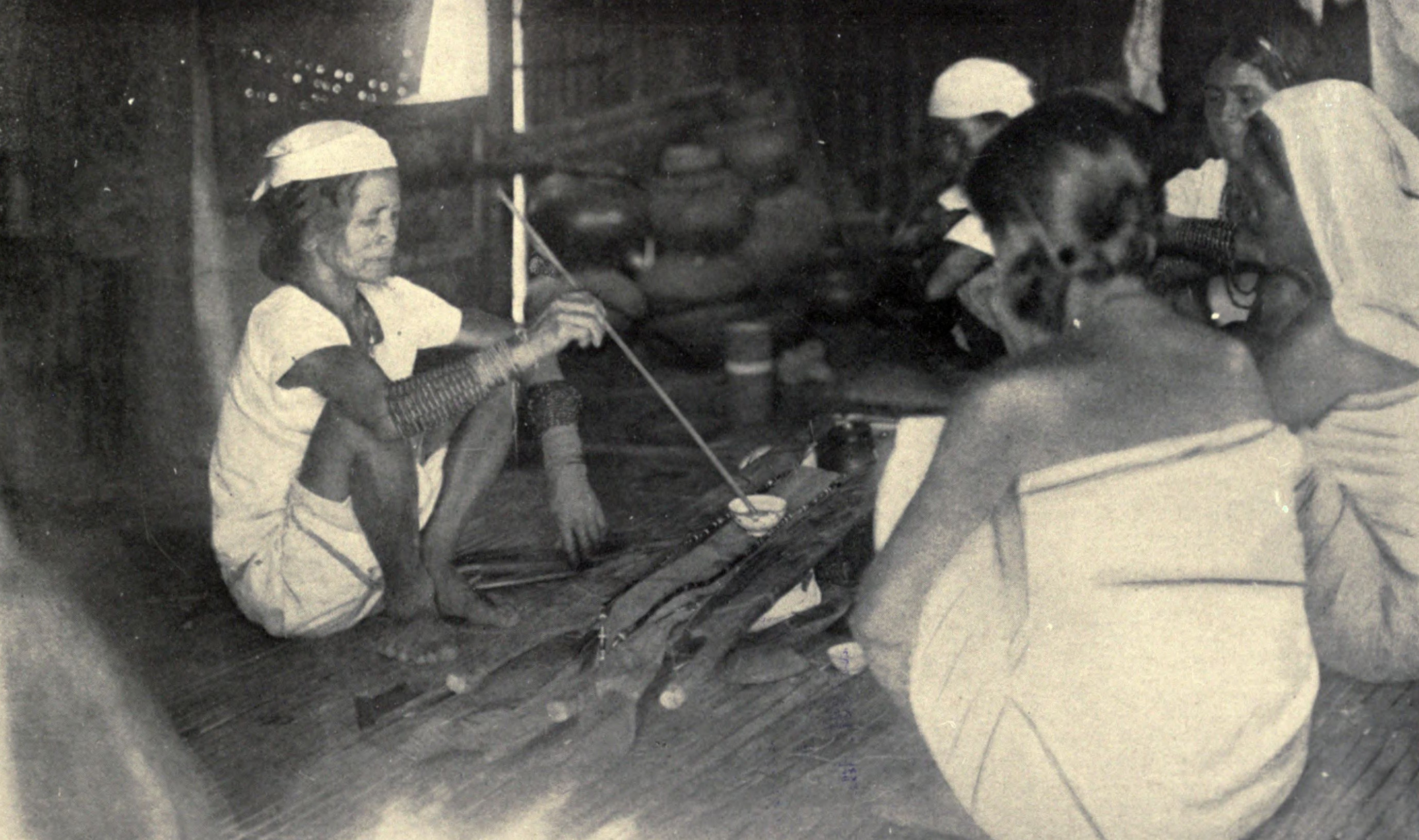
A shaman of the Itneg people in the Philippines renewing an offering to the spirit (anito) of a warrior's shield (kalasag) (1922)

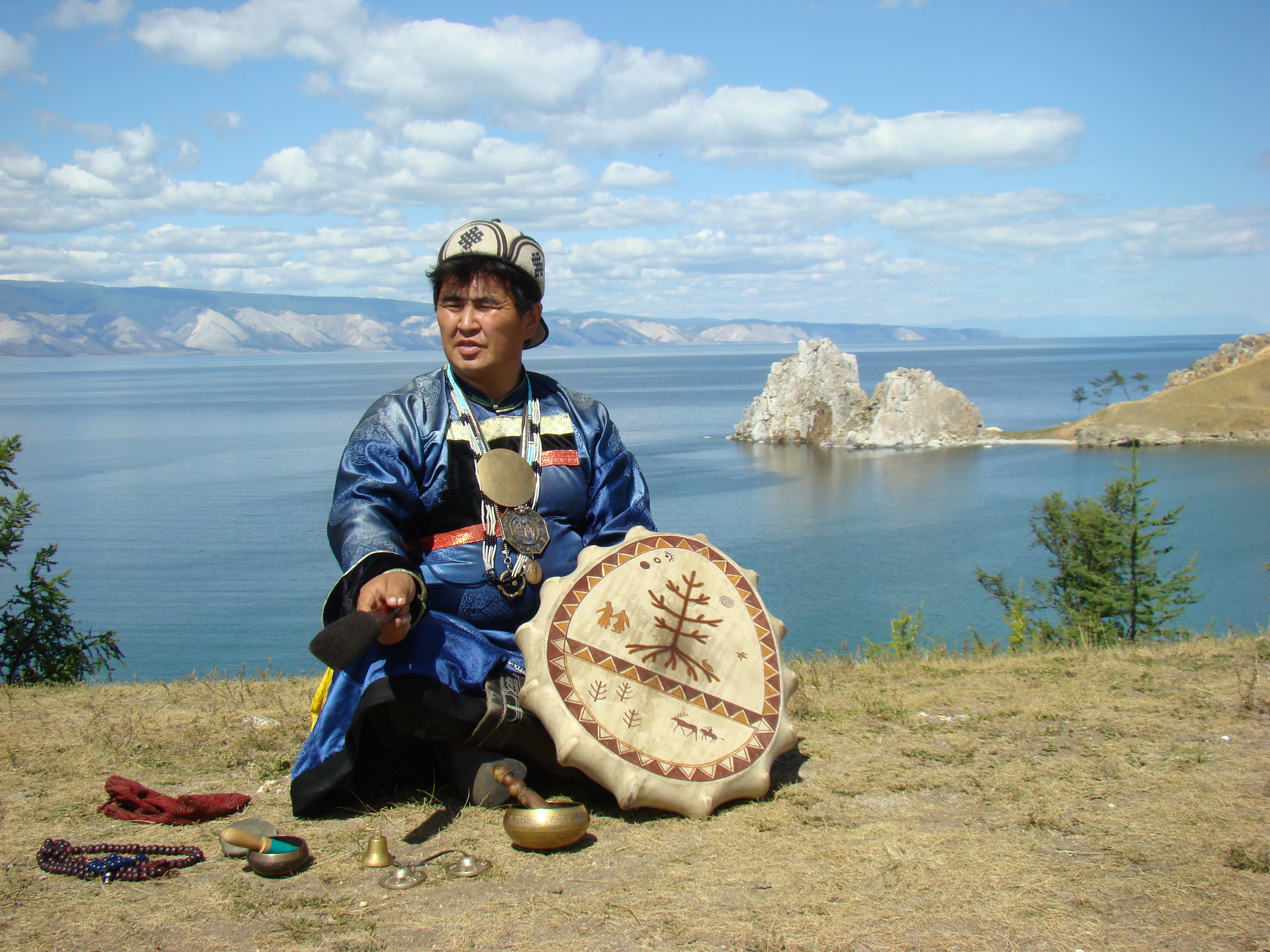
Buryat shaman on Olkhon Island, Russia

Shamans have been conceptualized as those who are able to gain knowledge and power to heal in the spiritual world or dimension. Most shamans have dreams or visions that convey certain messages. Shamans may say that they have or have acquired many spirit guides, who they believe guide and direct them in their travels in the spirit world. These spirit guides are always thought to be present within the shaman, although others are said to encounter them only when the shaman is in a trance. The spirit guide energizes the shamans, enabling them to enter the spiritual dimension. Shamans say that they heal within the communities and the spiritual dimension by returning lost parts of the human soul from wherever they have gone. Shamans also say that they cleanse excess negative energies, which are said to confuse or pollute the soul. Shamans act as mediators in their cultures. Shamans say that they communicate with the spirits on behalf of the community, including the spirits of the deceased. Shamans believe they can communicate with both living and dead to alleviate unrest, unsettled issues, and to deliver gifts to the spirits.

Shamans perform a variety of functions depending upon their respective cultures; healing, leading a sacrifice, preserving traditions by storytelling and songs, fortune-telling, and acting as a psychopomp ("guide of souls"). A single shaman may fulfill several of these functions.

There are distinct types of shamans who perform more specialized functions. For example, among the Nanai people, a distinct kind of shaman acts as a psychopomp. Other specialized shamans may be distinguished according to the type of spirits, or realms of the spirit world, with which the shaman most commonly interacts. These roles vary among the Nenets, Enets, and Selkup shamans.

The assistant of an Oroqen shaman (called jardalanin, or "second spirit") knows many things about the associated beliefs. He or she accompanies the rituals and interprets the behaviors of the shaman. Despite these functions, the jardalanin is not a shaman. For this interpretative assistant, it would be unwelcome to fall into a trance.

== Ecological aspect ==
As the primary teacher of tribal symbolism, the shaman may have a leading role in this ecological management, actively restricting hunting and fishing. Among the Tucano people, a sophisticated system exists for environmental resources management and for avoiding resource depletion through overhunting. This system is conceptualized mythologically and symbolically by the belief that breaking hunting restrictions may cause illness. The shaman is able to "release" game animals, or their souls, from their hidden abodes. The Piaroa people have ecological concerns related to shamanism. Among the Inuit the angakkuq (shamans) fetch the souls of game from remote places, or soul travel to ask for game from mythological beings like the Sea Woman.

== Economics ==
The way shamans get sustenance and take part in everyday life varies across cultures. In many Inuit groups, they provide services for the community and get a "due payment", and believe the payment is given to the helping spirits. An account states that the gifts and payments that a shaman receives are given by his partner spirit. Since it obliges the shaman to use his gift and to work regularly in this capacity, the spirit rewards him with the goods that it receives. These goods, however, are only "welcome addenda". They are not enough to enable a full-time shaman. Shamans live like any other member of the group, as a hunter or housewife.

Since the early 2000s, the growth of ayahuasca tourism in South America has created an economic niche for practitioners, particularly in Iquitos, Peru, where retreat centers cater to foreign visitors. Media attention in international outlets further contributed to this trend, and many shamans and facilitators now sustain themselves by leading ceremonies for paying participants.

Furthermore, due to the predominant number of female shamans over males, shamanism was and continues to be an integral part of women's economic liberation. Shamanism often serves as an economic resource due to the requirement of payment for service. This economic revenue was vital for female shamans, especially those living during the Chosun Dynasty in Korea (A.D. 1392–1910). In a culture that disapproved of female economic autonomy, the practice of shamanism allowed women to advance themselves financially and independently, in a way that had not been possible for them before.

== Academic study ==
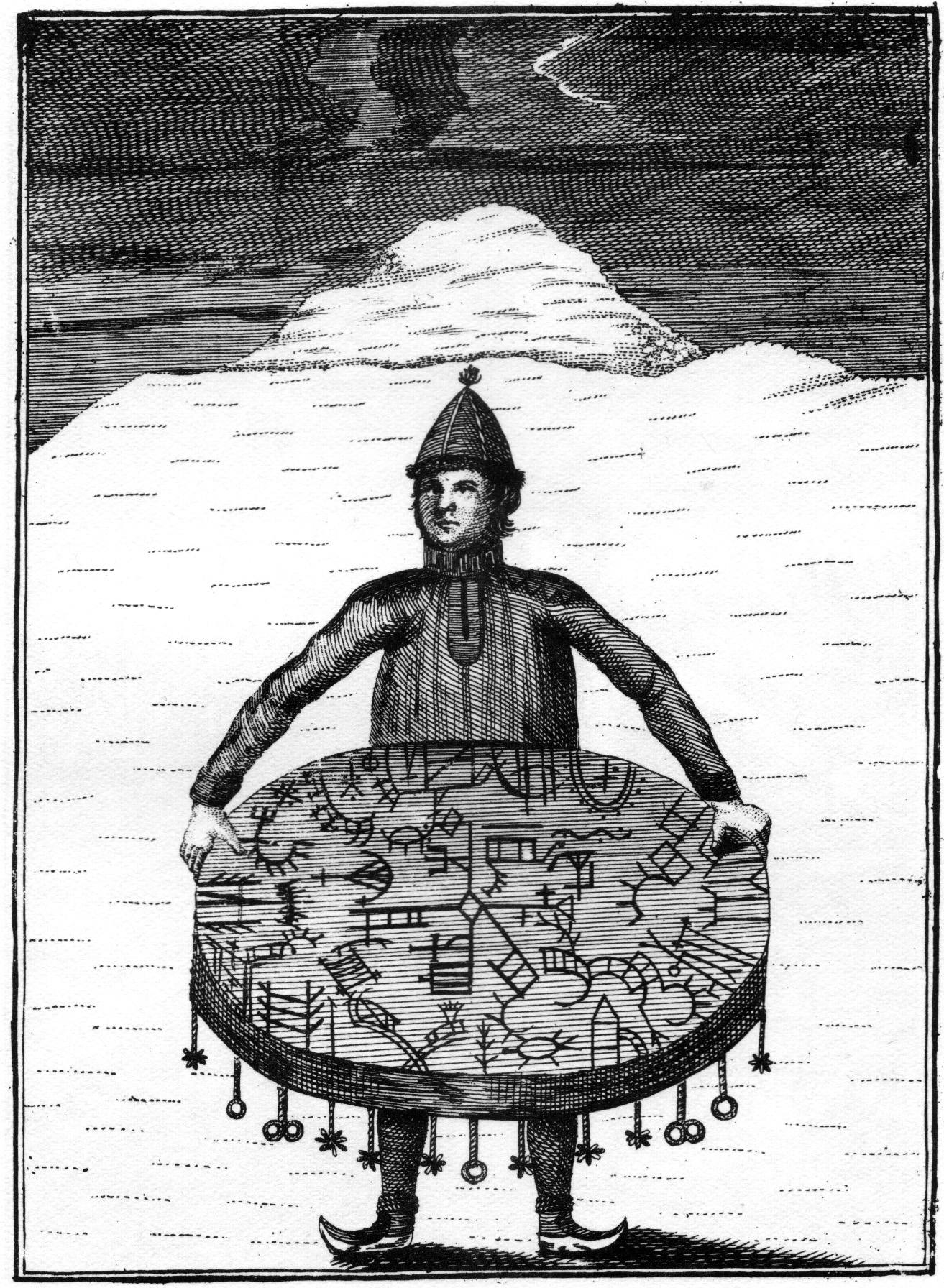
Sámi noaidi with his drum

=== Cognitive and evolutionary approaches ===
There are two major frameworks among cognitive and evolutionary scientists for explaining shamanism. The first, proposed by anthropologist Michael Winkelman, is known as the "neurotheological theory". According to Winkelman, shamanism develops reliably in human societies because it provides valuable benefits to the practitioner, their group, and individual clients. In particular, the trance states induced by dancing, hallucinogens, and other triggers are hypothesized to have an "integrative" effect on cognition, allowing communication among mental systems that specialize in theory of mind, social intelligence, and natural history. With this cognitive integration, the shaman can better predict the movement of animals, resolve group conflicts, plan migrations, and provide other useful services.

The neurotheological theory contrasts with the "by-product" or "subjective" model of shamanism developed by anthropologist Manvir Singh. According to Singh, shamanism is a cultural technology that adapts to (or hacks) our psychological biases to convince us that a specialist can influence important but uncontrollable outcomes. Citing work on the psychology of magic and superstition, Singh argues that humans search for ways of influencing uncertain events, such as healing illness, controlling rain, or attracting animals. As specialists compete to help their clients control these outcomes, they drive the evolution of psychologically compelling magic, producing traditions adapted to people's cognitive biases. Shamanism, Singh argues, is the culmination of this cultural evolutionary process—a psychologically appealing method for controlling uncertainty. For example, some shamanic practices exploit our intuitions about humanness: Practitioners use trance and dramatic initiations to seemingly become entities distinct from normal humans and thus more apparently capable of interacting with the invisible forces believed to oversee important outcomes. Influential cognitive and anthropological scientists, such as Pascal Boyer and Nicholas Humphrey, have endorsed Singh's approach, although other researchers have criticized Singh's dismissal of individual- and group-level benefits.

=== Ecological approaches and systems theory ===
Gerardo Reichel-Dolmatoff relates these concepts to developments in the ways that modern science (systems theory, ecology, new approaches in anthropology and archeology) treats causality in a less linear fashion. He also suggests a cooperation of modern science and Indigenous lore.

=== Historical origins ===
Some scholars suggest that shamanic practices may originate as early as the Paleolithic, predating all organized religions, and at least as early as the Neolithic period. The earliest burial interpreted by some researchers as that of a shaman (and by extension the earliest supposed evidence of shamans and shamanic practices) dates back to the early Upper Paleolithic era (c. 30,000 BP) in what is now the Czech Republic.

One influential but debated theory proposed by Sanskrit scholar and comparative mythologist Michael Witzel suggests that all of the world's mythologies, and also the concepts and practices of shamans, can be traced to the migrations of two prehistoric populations: the "Gondwana" type (of circa 65,000 years ago) and the "Laurasian" type (of circa 40,000 years ago).

In November 2008, researchers from the Hebrew University of Jerusalem announced the discovery of a 12,000-year-old site in Israel that is perceived as one of the earliest-known shaman burials. The elderly woman had been arranged on her side, with her legs apart and folded inward at the knee. Ten large stones were placed on the head, pelvis, and arms. Among her unusual grave goods were 50 complete tortoise shells, a human foot, and certain body parts from animals such as a cow tail and eagle wings. Other animal remains came from a boar, leopard, and two martens. "It seems that the woman … was perceived as being in a close relationship with these animal spirits", the researchers wrote. The grave was one of at least 28 graves at the site, located in a cave in lower Galilee and belonging to the Natufian culture, but is said to be unlike any other among the Epipaleolithic Natufians or in the Paleolithic period.

=== Semiotic and hermeneutic approaches ===
A debated etymology of the word "shaman" is "one who knows", implying, among other things, that the shaman is an expert in keeping together the multiple codes of the society, and that to be effective, shamans must maintain a comprehensive view in their mind which gives them certainty of knowledge. According to this view, the shaman uses (and the audience understands) multiple codes, expressing meanings in many ways: verbally, musically, artistically, and in dance. Meanings may be manifested in objects such as amulets. If the shaman knows the culture of their community well, and acts accordingly, their audience will know the used symbols and meanings and therefore trust the shamanic worker.

There are also semiotic, theoretical approaches to shamanism, and examples of "mutually opposing symbols" in academic studies of Siberian lore, distinguishing a "white" shaman who contacts sky spirits for good aims by day, from a "black" shaman who contacts evil spirits for bad aims by night. (Series of such opposing symbols referred to a world-view behind them. Analogously to the way grammar arranges words to express meanings and convey a world, also this formed a cognitive map). Shaman's lore is rooted in the folklore of the community, which provides a "mythological mental map". Juha Pentikäinen uses the concept "grammar of mind".

Armin Geertz coined and introduced the hermeneutics, or "ethnohermeneutics", interpretation. Hoppál extended the term to include not only the interpretation of oral and written texts, but that of "visual texts as well (including motions, gestures and more complex rituals, and ceremonies performed, for instance, by shamans)". Revealing the animistic views in shamanism, but also their relevance to the contemporary world, where ecological problems have validated paradigms of balance and protection.

=== Medical anthropology approaches ===
In many societies where shamanism is practiced, the understanding and treatment of illness are closely tied to social and cultural processes. Disease is often seen not just as a biological condition but as a disruption in the balance of spiritual and social relationships. The concept of the body in these contexts is multifaceted, encompassing physical, social, and cultural dimensions. Anthropologists Nancy Scheper-Hughes and Margaret Lock expand on this by introducing the idea of "the three bodies": the "individual body", relating to personal health experiences; the "social body", connecting health to social and cultural values; and the "body politic", reflecting the influence of power structures on health outcomes.

According to anthropologist Donald Joralemon, the practice of medicine is inherently a social process, both in shamanistic societies and contemporary biomedicine. Joralemon argues that healing rituals, diagnoses, and treatments are deeply embedded in the cultural norms and social expectations of a community. This is particularly evident in shamanism, where the shaman addresses not only physical symptoms but also the spiritual and communal aspects of illness. The shaman's role is to restore harmony within the individual and the community, reinforcing the social bonds believed to influence health. Joralemon emphasizes that in both traditional and modern medical practices, disease is not merely a biological fact but a social phenomenon, shaped by the cultural and societal contexts in which it occurs .

Where a Shaman is present within a community - the group determines whether an individual is true Shaman or not. The group also determines whether an individual is sick and doomed by sorcery, this is where a Shaman is given the role to dispel an illness. The Shaman does not become a great Shaman because they cure a person, it is because they are known by the group as great Shamans. Community members known as dreamers also listen in on private conversations to convey an individual's known sickness.

== Decline and revitalization and tradition-preserving movements ==
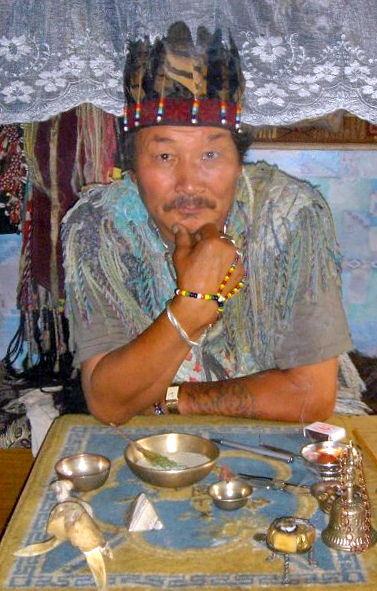
A shaman doctor of Kyzyl, 2005. Attempts are being made to preserve and revitalize Tuvan shamanism: former authentic shamans have begun to practice again, and young apprentices are being educated in an organized way.

Traditional, Indigenous shamanism is believed to be declining around the world. Whalers who frequently interacted with Inuit groups are one source of this decline in that region. In many areas, former shamans ceased to fulfill the functions in the community they used to, as they came to be mocked by their own community, or regarded their own past as deprecated and were unwilling to talk about it to ethnographers.

Besides personal communications of former shamans, folklore texts may narrate directly about a deterioration process. For example, a Buryat epic text details the wonderful deeds of the ancient "first shaman" Kara-Gürgän: he could even compete with God, create life, steal back the soul of the sick from God without his consent. A subsequent text laments that shamans of older times were stronger, possessing capabilities like omnividence, fortune-telling even for decades in the future, moving as fast as a bullet.

In most affected areas, shamanic practices ceased to exist, with authentic shamans dying and their personal experiences dying with them. The loss of memories is not always lessened by the fact the shaman is not always the only person in a community who knows the beliefs and motives related to the local shaman-hood. Although the shaman is often believed and trusted precisely because they "accommodate" to the beliefs of the community, several parts of the knowledge related to the local shamanhood consist of personal experiences of the shaman, or root in their family life, thus, those are lost with their death. Besides that, in many cultures, the entire traditional belief system has become endangered (often together with a partial or total language shift), with the other people of the community remembering the associated beliefs and practices (or the language at all) grew old or died, many folklore memories, songs, and texts were forgotten—which may threaten even such peoples who could preserve their isolation until the middle of the 20th century, like the Nganasan.

Some areas could enjoy a prolonged resistance due to their remoteness.

- Variants of shamanism among Inuit were once a widespread (and very diverse) phenomenon, but today is rarely practiced, as well as already having been in decline among many groups, even while the first major ethnological research was being done, e.g. among Inuit, at the end of the 19th century, Sagloq, the last angakkuq who was believed to be able to travel to the sky and under the sea died—and many other former shamanic capacities were lost during that time as well, like ventriloquism and sleight of hand.
- The isolated location of Nganasan people allowed shamanism to be a living phenomenon among them even at the beginning of the 20th century, the last notable Nganasan shaman's ceremonies were recorded on film in the 1970s.

After exemplifying the general decline even in the most remote areas, there are revitalizations or tradition-preserving efforts as a response. Besides collecting the memories, there are also tradition-preserving and even revitalization efforts, led by authentic former shamans (for example among the Sakha people and Tuvans).

Native Americans in the United States do not call their traditional spiritual ways "shamanism". However, according to Richard L. Allen, research and policy analyst for the Cherokee Nation, they are regularly overwhelmed with inquiries by and about fraudulent shamans, (aka "plastic medicine people"). He adds, "One may assume that anyone claiming to be a Cherokee 'shaman, spiritual healer, or pipe-carrier', is equivalent to a modern day medicine show and snake-oil vendor."

== See also ==
- Bomoh
- Chinese ritual mastery traditions
- Chöd
- Divine madness
- Dukun
- Ecstatic dance
- Fugara
- Itako
- Jagar
- Mu
- Paganism
- Pawang
- Prehistoric medicine
- Prophetic medicine
- Reincarnation § Ho-Chunk
- List of religions
  - List of ethnic religions
- Seiðr
- Soulcatcher
- Spirit spouse
- Tongji
- White magic
- Wu
- Yachay
- Zduhać
