= Manvir Singh (anthropologist) =

American anthropologist (born 1990)

- Born: 1990 (age 35–36)

Academic work
- Discipline: Anthropology
- Institutions: University of California, Davis

Manvir Singh (born 1990) is an Assistant Professor of Anthropology at the University of California, Davis, and a contributing writer for The New Yorker.

== Education and early career ==
Singh holds a Ph.D. in Human Evolutionary Biology (2020) from Harvard University. During his doctoral studies, he shifted focus toward anthropology following being influenced by research on cross-cultural human behaviors.

Singh attended Rutgers Preparatory School, in Somerset, New Jersey, and holds a bachelor's in human biology from Brown University, where his studies focused on animal behavior, ecology, and evolution, along with a thesis on burying beetles.

== Research ==
- Shamanism and religion: Singh explores shamanism as a "cognitive technology" that humans repeatedly redevelop to manage life's uncertainties, such as illness or weather. He argues that shamanic practices reflect universal aspects of human psychology and persist even in modern contexts, such as in the practices of Silicon Valley CEOs.
- Music and storytelling: Singh studies the cross-cultural patterns of music (e.g., lullabies and dance music) and narrative structures to identify present universal perceptual phenomena.
- Social organization and justice: Singh's work examines the origins of human behavior regarding law, punitive justice, and the development of shared social rules.
- Psychedelics: Singh investigates the historical and traditional use of psychedelics, particularly their role in shamanic rituals and their impact on belief systems.

== Publications ==
=== Books ===
- Shamanism: The Timeless Religion. Alfred A. Knopf. 2025. ISBN 978-0593321157.
  - Received the 2025 Carol R. Ember Book Prize, awarded by the Society for Anthropological Sciences. The prize recognizes work that combines ethnography with cross-cultural analysis and cognitive science.
- Zoostalgia (2012)
- The Evolutionist's Doodlebook. Fuss Klas Publishing. 2011. ISBN 978-0615504780.

=== Selected academic publications ===
- Singh, Manvir (2018). "The Cultural Evolution of Shamanism". Behavioral and Brain Sciences. 41: e66. doi:10.1017/S0140525X17001893.
- Mehr, Samuel A.; Singh, Manvir (2019). "Universality and Diversity in Human Song". Science. 366 (6468). doi:10.1126/science.aax0868. PMC 7001657.
- Singh, Manvir (2021). "Magic, Explanations, and Evil: The Origins and Design of Witches and Sorcerers". Current Anthropology. 62 (1): 2–29. doi:10.1086/713111.
- Singh, Manvir; Glowacki, Luke (2022). "Human social organization during the Late Pleistocene: Beyond the nomadic-egalitarian model". Evolution and Human Behavior. 43 (5): 418–431. doi:10.1016/j.evolhumbehav.2022.07.003.
- Singh, Manvir (2022). "Subjective selection and the evolution of complex culture". Evolutionary Anthropology. 31 (5): 239–254. doi:10.1002/evan.21948.

=== Popular essays and articles ===
- Singh, Manvir (July 14, 2022). "The 'Shamanification' of the Tech CEO". Wired.
- Singh, Manvir (February 20, 2023). "It's Time to Rethink the Idea of the 'Indigenous'". The New Yorker.
- Singh, Manvir (September 25, 2023). "Is an All-Meat Diet What Nature Intended?". The New Yorker.
- Singh, Manvir, "Read the Label: How psychiatric diagnoses create identities", The New Yorker, 13 May 2024, pp. 20–24.
- Singh, Manvir (October 27, 2025). "How Monsters Went from Menacing to Misunderstood". The New Yorker.
- Singh, Manvir (March 9, 2026). "How God Got So Great". The New Yorker.

== Awards and honors ==
- New Investigator Award (2021): Awarded by the Human Behavior and Evolution Society (HBES) for outstanding research by early-career scholars.
- NSF Graduate Research Fellowship (2015–2019): A competitive award supporting his doctoral research at Harvard University.
