= Calvert Watkins =

American linguist (1933–2013)

- Born: March 13, 1933; Pittsburgh, Pennsylvania, U.S.
- Died: March 20, 2013 (aged 80); Los Angeles, California, U.S.
- Title: Victor S. Thomas Professor of Linguistics and Classics
- Spouses: Jane Williams Cushman (married 1961); Stephanie Jamison (married 1980)
- Children: 4
- Awards: Guggenheim Fellowship; Goodwin Award of Merit

Academic background
- Education: Harvard University (BA, PhD); École pratique des hautes études
- Thesis: Indo-European origins of the Celtic verb (1962)

Academic work
- Discipline: Linguist
- Sub-discipline: Historical linguistics
- Institutions: Harvard University; University of California at Los Angeles
- Notable students: Andrew Garrett; Mark Hale; Jay Jasanoff; Brian Joseph; Joshua Katz; Craig Melchert; Alan Nussbaum
- Notable works: How to Kill a Dragon

Calvert Ward Watkins (/ˈwɒtkɪnz/; March 13, 1933 – March 20, 2013) was an American linguist and philologist, known for his book How to Kill a Dragon. He was a professor of linguistics and the classics at Harvard University and after retirement went to serve as professor-in-residence at UCLA.

== Early life and education ==
Calvert Ward Watkins was born in Pittsburgh, Pennsylvania, on March 13, 1933, to Ralph James Watkins, an economist and government advisor, and Willye Ward, a Spanish teacher who translated the personal memoirs of former Mexican president Gen. Antonio Lopez de Santa Anna. Much of Watkins's childhood was spent in New York City, and he graduated from Friends Seminary in Manhattan before beginning his career at Harvard University. Watkins's early exposure to Latin and Greek inspired him at the age of fifteen to decide to become an Indo-Europeanist.

Watkins received his initial undergraduate degree from Harvard University in 1954, graduating summa cum laude, then earned a Ph.D in linguistics from the university in 1959. During his time at Harvard, Watkins also studied abroad at the École pratique des hautes études in Paris, France, from 1954 to 1955 as well as the Dublin Institute for Advanced Studies, School of Celtic Studies from 1957 to 1958.

== Career ==
=== Harvard ===
In 1959, Watkins was initially appointed the position of instructor at Harvard University. He later became assistant professor in 1960, associate professor with tenure in 1962, and full professor in 1966. In 1989 Watkins was appointed to the position of Victor S Thomas Professor of Linguistics and Classics. Linguists influenced by Watkins during his tenure at Harvard include Ives Goddard, Jay Jasanoff, D. Gary Miller, Michael Silverstein, Alice Harris, H. Craig Melchert, Alan Nussbaum, Brent Vine, Mark Hale, Andrew Garrett, Joshua Katz and Benjamin Fortson.

Watkins remained dedicated to the research and development of historical linguistics throughout his entire academic and professional career. In 1982 he was a founding member of the "East Coast Indo-European Conference" in which he participated in a large majority of its annual meetings.

=== University of California, Los Angeles ===
Upon his retirement from Harvard in 2003, Watkins moved to Los Angeles, California, and began teaching at the University of California, Los Angeles, alongside his wife, Stephanie Jamison. Watkins continued to promote the importance of historical linguistics at UCLA by remaining active in the annual UCLA Indo-European Conference. In 2013, the 25th annual conference was dedicated to the memory of Watkins.

=== Early published works ===
His doctoral dissertation at Harvard University, Indo-European Origins of the Celtic Verb I. The Sigmatic Aorist (Dublin Institute for Advanced Studies, 1962), which deeply reflected the structuralist approach of Jerzy Kuryłowicz, opened a fresh era of creative work in Celtic comparative linguistics and the study of the verbal system of Indo-European languages.

On page 96 of Indo-European Origins of the Celtic Verb (1962), Watkins noted the following pattern in the history of the Celtic verb, as well as in Polish and Persian: “the development [...] or presence [...] of a zero ending in the 3sg., and the spread of this 3sg. form to other members of the paradigm." This became known in the field as Watkins's Law. The "law" as it relates to Proto-Celtic was already observed in 1909 by Rudolf Thurneysen on page 422 (section 683) of his Grammar of Old Irish, but it was Watkins who noticed that the same pattern occurred in the histories of other languages.

Watkins, in a sense, completed his contribution to this area with his Indogermanische Grammatik, vol. 3, part 1: Geschichte der indogermanischen Verbalflexion (1969). Meanwhile, his work on Indo-European vocabulary and poetics yielded a large number of articles on (among others) Celtic, Anatolian, Greek, Italic and Indo-Iranian material, presented directly in his Selected Writings and indirectly in his book, How to Kill a Dragon: Aspects of Indo-European Poetics (Oxford University Press, 1995).

He contributed his expertise on Indo-European languages to the first edition of The American Heritage Dictionary of the English Language and edited The American Heritage Dictionary of Indo-European Roots (ISBN 0-618-08250-6). He also pointed out that of all the Celtic languages, Old Irish is the closest match to the theorized Proto-Indo European mother tongue and that Old Irish represents an extraordinary ancient language whose structure can only be compared with that of Vedic Sanskrit.

=== How to Kill a Dragon: Aspects of Indo-European Poetics ===
How to Kill a Dragon: Aspects of Indo-European Poetics was published on November 16, 1995, through Oxford University Press and attempted to establish a formulaic method of comparative linguistics which exemplified the importance of the poetic formula in order to better trace the development of Indo-European languages by working backwards and identifying patterns from their mother language, Proto-Indo-European. The book is divided into two main halves, the first of which acts as a definition and introduction to the study of Indo-European poetics which is expanded upon by implementing Watkins's idea of the "dragon-slaying myth" and defending this concept through a number of case studies involving languages connected by a common theme. Watkins expands upon the "dragon-slaying myth" in part two of the text by offering new research into his proposed formula of "HERO SLAY SERPENT", he also attempts to reconstruct an example of Proto-Indo-European through the comparative method of historical linguistics.

Lingua Frankly reviewer Marc L'Heureux commented that Watkins also implements historical evidence to favor the development of language such as the relationship between the patron and the poet. He further opined that through the ceremonious delivery from the poet, the word choices became preserved as historical evidence of the language in question. Thus the poet was not only a wielder of great power, according to Watkins as the patron's prestige was inherently tied to the poet's prowess, but a recorder of language that has allowed for research to be conducted in order to better understand the development of ancient languages.

How to Kill a Dragon received favorable acclaim and is now considered to be a definitive text which transformed the study of Indo-European poetics. How to Kill a Dragon earned Watkins the 1998 Goodwin Award of Merit from the Society for Classical Studies.

=== Legacy and awards ===
- Honorary Member of the Royal Irish Academy (1968)
- Fellow of the American Academy of Arts and Sciences (1973)
- Member of the American Philosophical Society (1975)
- Senior Fellowship for Independent Study and Research from the National Endowment for the Humanities (1984–85)
- Corresponding Fellow of the British Academy (1987)
- Académie des Inscriptions et Belles-Lettres, Correspondant Etranger (1990)
- Guggenheim Fellowships for demonstration of exceptional capacity for productive scholarship and exceptional creative ability in the arts in the field of linguistics (1991)
- Goodwin Award of Merit for How to Kill a Dragon (1998)
- President of the Linguistic Society of America in 1988
- Associé Étranger, Membre de l'Institut (1999)

== Death ==
Calvert Watkins died in his sleep at the age of 80 in Los Angeles, California, on March 20, 2013. He was the Distinguished Professor in Residence of the Department of Classics and the Program in Indo-European Studies at the University of California, Los Angeles, where he had moved in 2003 after retiring from Harvard University as Victor S. Thomas Professor of Linguistics and the Classics.

== Published works ==
- "Review of Kenneth Jackson, Language and History in Early Britain: A Chronological Survey of the Britannic Languages, First to Twelfth Century A.D.," Language 30 (1954) 513–18; P. Guiraud, Bibliographie critique de la statistique linguistique rev. & completed by D. Houchin, J. Puhvel & Watkins under the direction of J. Whatmough (Utrecht, 1954). REVS: BSL L 1954,2 44–46 Cohen; Emerita XXIV 1956 187 Tovar
- "The Phonemics of Gaulish: The Dialect of Narbonensis," Language 31 (1955) 9–19
- "Preliminaries to a Historical and Comparative Analysis of the Syntax of the Old Irish Verb," Celtica 6 (1963) 1–49
- "Indo-European Metrics and Archaic Irish Verse," Celtica 6 (1963) 194–249; "Lat. nox, by night. A Problem in Syntactic Reconstruction," Symbolae linguisticae in honorem J. Kuryłowicz, ed. A. Heinz (Wrocław, 1965) 351–358
- "An Indo-European Construction in Greek and Latin," HSCP 71 (1966) 115–119; J. Kuryłowicz, Indogermanische Grammatik, III, 1. Teil : Formenlehre : Geschichte der indogermanischen Verbalflexion by Watkins (Heidelberg: Carl Winter Universitätsverlag, 1969) REV. Paideia XXX 1975 382–386 Pisani; WZHalle XXI 1972, 1 99–102 Barschel | DLZ XCII 1971 849–851 Sternemann | Language XLVIII 1972 687–695 Wyatt
- "The Indo-European Origin of English," The American Heritage Dictionary of the English Language New York: American Heritage and Houghton Mifflin, 1969) xix-xx
- "Indo-European and the Indo Europeans," ibid., 1496–502; "Indo-European Roots," ibid., 1505–50
- "A Latin-Hittite Etymology," Language 45 (1969) 235–242
- "A Further Remark of Lachmann's Law," HSCP 74 (1970) 55–65
- "On the Family of arceō, ἀρκέω, and Hittite h⌣ark-," HSCP 74 (1970) 67–74
- "An Indo-European Agricultural Term, Latin ador, Hittite h⌣at-," HSCP 77 (1973) 187–194
- "Etyma Enniana," HSCP 77 (1973) 195–206
- "Latin suppus," JIES 1 (1973) 394–399
- "I.-E. Star," Sprache 20 (1974) 10–14
- "God," Antiquitates Indogermanicae. Studien zur indogermanischen Altertumskunde und zur Sprach- und Kulturgeschichte der indogermanischen Völker. Gedenkschrift für Hermann Guentert zur 25. Wiederkehr seines Todestages am 23. April 1973, ed. M. Mayrhofer, W. Meid, B. Schlerath & R. Schmitt (Innsbruck, 1974) 101–110
- "La famille indo-européenne de grec ὄρχις. Linguistique, poétique et mythologie," BSL 70 (1975) 11–26
- "Latin ador, Hittite hat- Again. Addenda to HSCP LXXVII 187–193," HSCP 79 (1975) 181–187; "Latin iouiste et le vocabulaire religieux indo-européen," Mélanges offerts à E. Benveniste (Paris, 1975) 527–534; "La désignation indo-européenne du tabou," Langue, discours, société. Pour Émile Benveniste ed. J. Kristeva, J.C. Milner, & N. Ruwet (Paris, 1975) 208–214
- "Towards Proto-Indo-European Syntax: Problems and Pseudo-Problems," Chicago Linguistic Society (Parasession on diachronic syntax) 12.2 (1976) 305–26
- "Observations on the Nestor's Cup Inscription," HSCP 80 (1976) 25–40
- "Syntax and Metrics in the Dipylon Vase Inscription," Studies in Greek, Italic, and Indo-European Linguistics Offered to Leonard R. Palmer on the Occasion of his Seventieth Birthday June 5, 1976, ed. Davies A. Morpurgo & W. Meid (Innsbruck, 1976) 431–441
- "À propos de μῆνις," BSL 72, 1 (1977) 187–209; "ἀνόστεος ὁν πόδα τένδει," Étrennes de septantaine. Travaux de linguistique et de grammaire comparée offerts à Michel Lejeune (Paris, 1978) 231–235
- "La désignation indo-européenne du tabou," Langue, discours, société. Pour Émile Benveniste ed. J. Kristeva, J.C. Milner, & N. Ruwet (Paris, 1975) 208–214
- "Let Us Now Praise Famous Grains," PAPS 122 (1978) 9–17; "A Greco-Hittite Etymology," Serta Indogermanica. Festschrift für Günter Neumann zum 60. Geburtstag, ed. J. Tischler (Innsbruck, 1982) 455–457
- (as editor) The American Heritage Dictionary of Indo-European Roots. Boston: Houghton Mifflin, 1985; 2nd edn. 2000.
- "The Language of the Trojans," Troy and the Trojan War. A Symposium Held at Bryn Mawr College, October, 1984, ed. M.T. Mellink (Bryn Mawr, PA, 1986) 45–62
- "The Name of Meleager," O-o-pe-ro-si. Festschrift für Ernst Risch zum 75. Geburtstag, ed. A. Etter (Berlin, 1986) 320–328
- "Questions linguistiques de poétique, de mythologie et de pré-droit en indo-européen," LALIES 5 (1987) 3–29
- "'In the Interstices of Procedure.' Indo-European Legal Language and Comparative Law," Studien zum indogermanischen Wortschatz, ed. Wolfgang Meid (Innsbruck, 1987) 305–314; Studies in Memory of Warren Cowgill (1929–1985). Papers from the Fourth East Coast Indo-European Conference, Cornell University, June 6–9, 1986 (ed.) (Berlin & New York, 1987) REVS.: Kratylos XXXV 1990 41–48 Rix; ILing XII 1987–88 188 R. Gusmani
- "New Parameters in Historical Linguistics, Philology, and Culture History," Language 65 (1989) 783–99
- "Le dragon hittite Illuyankas et le géant grec Typhôeus," CRAI (1992) 319–330; How to Kill a Dragon: Aspects of Indo-European Poetics (Oxford, 1995) REVS: CJ 1997–1998 92 (4): 417–422 Dunkel; JAOS 1997 117 (2): 397–398 Klein; Language 1997 73 (3): 637–641 Justus; CO 1996–1997 74 (3): 123 Klein; CW 1998–1999 92 (2): 175–176 Kelly; BSL 1998 93 (2): 116–130 Bader; Kratylos 2000 45: 36–46 Schlerath; CR 2000 N. S. 50 (1): 101–103 Konstan; EMC 2000 N. S. 19 (3): 399–406 Bubenik; IF 2001 106 : 282–290 Keydana
- "Greece in Italy outside Rome," HSCP 97 (1995) 35–50
- "Homer and Hittite Revisited," Style and Tradition: Studies in Honor of Wendell Clausen, ed. Peter E. Knox and Clive Foss (Stuttgart, 1998) 201–211
- "A Distant Anatolian Echo in Pindar: the Origin of the Aegis Again," HSCP 100 (2000) 1–14; "L'Anatolie et la Grèce : résonances culturelles, linguistiques et poétiques," CRAI (2000) 1143–1158
- "À la suite des perspectives tracées par Michel Lejeune: aspects du grec et du celtique," CRAI (2001) 213–223
- "An Indo-European Linguistic Area and Its Characteristics: Ancient Anatolia. Areal Diffusion as a Challenge to the Comparative Method? in Areal Diffusion and Genetic Inheritance: Problems in Comparative Linguistics ed. Alexandra Y. Aikhenvald & R.M.W. Dixon (Oxford: Oxford University Press, 2001) 44–63
- "The Golden Bowl: Thoughts on the New Sappho and its Asianic Background," ClAnt 26,2 (2007) 305–325
- "The Erbessos Blues and Other Tales of the Semantics of Case and the Semantics of Love among the Western Greeks," La langue poétique indo-européenne : actes du colloque de travail de la Société des études indo-européennes (Indogermanische Gesellschaft, Society for Indo-European studies), Paris, 22–24 octobre 2003, ed. Georges-Jean Pinault and Daniel Petit (Leuven, 2006) 517–521
- "Hipponactea quaedam," Hesperos: Studies in Ancient Greek Poetry Presented to M. L. West on His Seventieth Birthday, ed. Patrick J. Finglass, Christopher Collard, and Nicholas J. Richardson (Oxford, 2007) 118–125.
