= Stephanie W. Jamison =

American linguist (born 1948)

Stephanie Wroth Jamison (born July 17, 1948) is an American linguist, currently at the University of California, Los Angeles and an elected Fellow of the American Academy of Arts & Sciences. She did her doctoral work at Yale University as a student of Stanley Insler, and is trained as a historical linguist and Indo-Europeanist. Much of her work focusses on Sanskrit and other Indo-Iranian languages.

She was married to the Indo-Europeanist Calvert Watkins from 1980 until his death in 2013.

== Selected works ==
- Jamison, Stephanie W (1983), Function and form in the -áya-formations of the Rig Veda and Atharva Veda, Vandenhoeck & Ruprecht, ISBN 978-3-525-26219-1
- Jamison, Stephanie W (1991), The ravenous hyenas and the wounded sun: myth and ritual in ancient India, Cornell University Press, ISBN 978-0-8014-2433-5
- Jamison, Stephanie W (1996), Sacrificed wife/sacrificer's wife: women, ritual, and hospitality in ancient India, Oxford University Press, ISBN 978-0-19-509663-7
- Jamison, Stephanie W.; Brereton, Joel P. (2014), The Rigveda: the earliest religious poetry of India, Oxford Oxford University Press, ISBN 978-0-19-936378-0
