= Winfred P. Lehmann =

American linguist (1916–2007)

- Lehmann, pictured in his 1977 Festschrift
- Born: June 23, 1916; Surprise, Nebraska, U.S.
- Died: August 1, 2007 (aged 91); Austin, Texas, U.S.
- Spouse: Ruth Preston Miller (m. 1940, died)
- Children: 2
- Awards: Commander's Cross of the Order of Merit of the Federal Republic of Germany (1987)

Academic background
- Education: University of Wisconsin
- Doctoral advisor: William Freeman Twaddell; Roe-Merrill S. Heffner

Academic work
- Discipline: Linguistics
- Sub-discipline: Historical linguistics
- Institutions: Washington University in St. Louis; University of Texas at Austin
- Main interests: Germanic linguistics; Indo-European linguistics; Machine translation
- Notable works: Proto-Indo-European Phonology (1952); Historical Linguistics (1962); Proto-Indo-European Syntax (1974); Syntactic Typology (1981); Gothic Etymological Dictionary (1986); Theoretical Bases of Indo-European Linguistics (1993); Pre-Indo-European (2002)
- Notable ideas: OV / VO dichotomy, Fundamental Principle of Placement (FPP)

Winfred Philip Lehmann (June 23, 1916 – August 1, 2007) was an American linguist who specialized in historical, Germanic, and Indo-European linguistics. He was for many years a professor and head of departments for linguistics at the University of Texas at Austin, and served as president of both the Linguistic Society of America and the Modern Language Association. Lehmann was also a pioneer in machine translation. He lectured a large number of future scholars at Austin, and was the author of several influential works on linguistics.

== Early life and education ==
Winfred P. Lehmann was born in Surprise, Nebraska, on June 23, 1916, the son of the Lutheran minister Philipp Ludwig Lehmann and Elenore Friederike Grosnick. The family was German-American and spoke German at home. They moved to Wisconsin while Lehmann was a boy.

After graduating from high school, Lehmann studied German and classical philology at Northwestern College, where he received his BA in humanities in 1936. He subsequently enrolled at the University of Wisconsin. At Wisconsin, Lehmann specialized in phonetics and Indo-European and Germanic philology. He studied a variety of topics, including the works of John Milton and Homer, German literature, and became proficient in a diverse number of languages, including Old Church Slavonic, Lithuanian, Old Irish, Sanskrit and Old Persian. His command of languages would eventually extend to Arabic, Hebrew, Japanese, Turkish, and several branches of the Indo-European languages, including Celtic, Germanic, Italic, Balto-Slavic, Hellenic, Anatolian and Indo-Iranian.

Among his teachers at the University of Wisconsin were the Indo-Europeanist and Balticist Alfred E. Senn, Celticist Myles Dillon, Scandinavist Einar Haugen, and Morris Swadesh, William Freeman Twaddell and Roe-Merrill S. Heffner. Haugen's fieldwork among Scandinavian Americans would prove highly influential for Lehmann's later work on sociolinguistics. With Swadesh, Lehmann carried out studies on the Ho-Chunk people. Twaddell and Heffner were to have the strongest influence on him. He spent much time working with Heffner on phonetics, and the two co-wrote several articles on dialectology and sociophonetics for the journal American Speech, which are still of importance to scholars today. Lehmann gained his MA in 1938, and his PhD in 1941, both in Germanic linguistics at Wisconsin. His PhD thesis on verbs in Germanic languages was co-directed by Twaddell and Heffner.

== Early career ==
From 1942 to 1946, Lehmann served in the Signal Corps of the United States Army. During World War II he was an instructor in Japanese for the United States Army, and eventually became officer-in-charge of the Japanese Language School. The administrative experience and knowledge of non-Indo-European languages that he acquired during the war would have a major impact on his later career.

Since 1946, Lehmann taught at Washington University in St. Louis, where he served as instructor (1946) and as assistant professor (1946–1949) of German. Wishing to focus more on linguistics and philology rather than only the German language, he arranged with Leonard Bloomfield to spend the summer at Yale University to catch up with advances in linguistics during the war, but these plans came to nothing after Bloomfield suffered a debilitating stroke.

== Career ==
Animated map of Indo-European migrations in accordance with the Kurgan hypothesis. Much of Lehmann's research centered on the Proto-Indo-European language.

In 1949, Lehmann transferred to the University of Texas at Austin, which at the time had about 12,000 students and was known for its strength in philology and for its university library. He subsequently served as Associate Professor (1949–1951) and Professor (1951–1962) of Germanic Languages at University of Texas at Austin. During this time Lehmann published his influential work Proto-Indo-European Phonology (1952).

Since 1953, Lehmann served as Chairman of the Department of Germanic Languages (1953–1964), Acting Chairman of the Department of Slavic Languages (1960–1965). In 1963 he was made Ashbel Smith Professor of Linguistics and Germanic Linguistics (1963–1983). The Ashbel Smith professorship accorded him twice the salary of an ordinary professor. In 1964, Lehmann became the founding Chairman of the Department of Linguistics (1964–1972).

As the chairman of both the Germanic and linguistics departments, Lehmann oversaw the development of highly successful first-rate programs in German and linguistics. Knowledge of languages, and linguistics in particular, was in great demand after the launching of Sputnik 1, and his programs received generous funding through the National Defense Education Act and from the National Science Foundation. His efforts were greatly aided by the strong support he received from university president Harry Ransom. Lehmann arranged world-class conferences in both linguistics and German literature, established several linguistic institutes, a Visiting Writer's Program, and hired numerous distinguished professors in German and linguistics. Scholars hired by him during this time include Emmon Bach, Robert T. Harms, Edgar C. Polomé and Werner Winter. In 1961, Lehmann established the Linguistics Research Center (LRC), of which he was Director until his death. Through the LRC, he secured millions in funding to the field of machine translation and historical linguistics. Lehmann was also instrumental in the establishment of the Arabic Center (later the Center for Middle Eastern Studies) and the Hindi-Telugu Center (later the Center for South Asian Studies). He notably cooperated with Gardner Lindzey on developing studies in psycholinguistics.

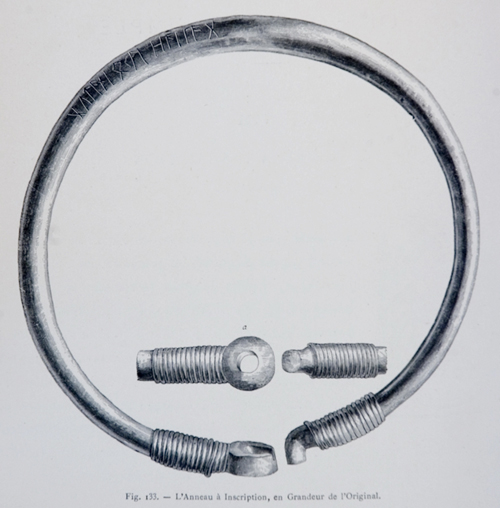
Runic inscription in Gothic on the Ring of Pietroassa. Lehmann was a known authority on the Gothic language.

Lehmann was well known for his teaching style, and notably encouraged his students to seek to understand his lectures rather than just simply writing them down. Instead of only grading his students' papers and exams, he would give them detailed evaluations of their performance, and encouraged them to pursue and develop ideas. Lehmann strongly encouraged his students to seek having their works published in academic journals.

Under the leadership of Lehmann, the departments for Germanic languages and linguistics at University of Texas at Austin both became among the top five graduate programs in North America, which they remained for 25 years. Almost ten percent of all PhDs awarded in linguistics in the United States during this time came from the University of Texas at Austin. He supervised more than fifty PhDs and mentored hundreds of students, many of whom would acquire prominent positions in their respective fields.

Lehmann was president of the Linguistic Society of America in 1973, and president of the Modern Language Association of America in 1987. He remains the only person to have led both of these organizations, which are the two most important and prestigious professional organizations for linguistics in the United States. Throughout his career, Lehmann was also Member of the Association for Computational Linguistics (President in 1964), the Society for the Advancement of Scandinavian Study, the American Oriental Society, Société de Linguistique de Paris, Indogermanische Gesellschaft, Linguistic Society of India, Societas Linguistica Europaea, Early English Text Society, the board of directors of the American Council of Learned Societies, Corresponding Member of the Institut für Deutsche Sprache, chair of the board of trustees of the Center for Applied Linguistics (1974–), and Corresponding Fellow of the Royal Danish Academy of Sciences and Letters. He was also a Fulbright and Guggenheim Fellow.

Combined with his teaching and administrative duties, Lehmann was engaged with research and writing. His Historical Linguistics: An Introduction (1962) has been translated into Japanese, German, Spanish and Italian, and remains a standard work on historical linguistics. He edited the Reader in Nineteenth Century Historical Indo-European Linguistics (1967), which remains a standard work on both Indo-European, historical, and comparative linguistics. His Proto-Indo-European Syntax (1974) was hailed as breakthrough by linguist Robert J. Jeffers, who reviewed it in the journal Language. Studies in Descriptive and Historical Linguistics, a festschrift in Lehmann's honor, was published in 1977 under the editorship of Paul Hopper. His influential Syntactic Typology was published in 1981.

In 1983, Lehmann was made Louann and Larry Temple Centennial Professor in the Humanities at University of Texas at Austin. He received the Harry H. Ransom Award for Teaching Excellence in the Liberal Arts in 1983, which he would describe as the greatest honor of his career. In 1984, together with fellow researcher Jonathan Slocum, Lehmann developed a groundbreaking prototype computer program for language translation, which the LRC put into commercial production for Siemens.

== Retirement ==
Lehmann retired as Louann and Larry Temple Centennial Professor Emeritus in the Humanities in 1986. Although having retired from teaching, he was still very active as a researcher at the Linguistics Research Center at the University of Texas at Austin, and continued to write books and articles. In 1986 Lehmann founded the journal Computers and Translation, now Machine Translation, of which he was the founding editor. His Gothic Etymological Dictionary (1986) has been described as the best work ever published on Germanic etymology. He received the Commander's Cross of the Order of Merit of the Federal Republic of Germany in 1987.

Notable works authored by Lehmann during his final years include the third edition of Historical Linguistics (1992) and Theoretical Bases of Indo-European Linguistics (1993). Language Change and Typological Variation, a second festschrift in his honor, was published by the Institute for the Study of Man in 1999 under the editorship of Edgar C. Polomé and Carol F. Justus. Lehmann completed his final monograph, Pre-Indo-European (2002), at the age of 86.

== Death and legacy ==
Lehmann was preceded in death by his wife Ruth and his son Terry, and died in Austin, Texas on August 1, 2007.

Throughout his career, Lehmann wrote more than fifty books and special issues of journals, and over 250 articles and more than 140 reviews. These works covered a diverse set of topics, including Middle High German literature, Japanese grammar, Old Irish, Biblical Hebrew, and textbooks on the German language. His contributions to the fields of Indo-European, Germanic and historical linguistics, and machine translation, have been significant, and several of his works on these subjects have remained standard texts up to the present day. He is remembered for his crucial role in establishing the University of Texas at Austin as one of America's leading institutions in linguistics, and for the large numbers of students that he taught and mentored, many of whom have made major contributions to scholarship.

== Personal life ==
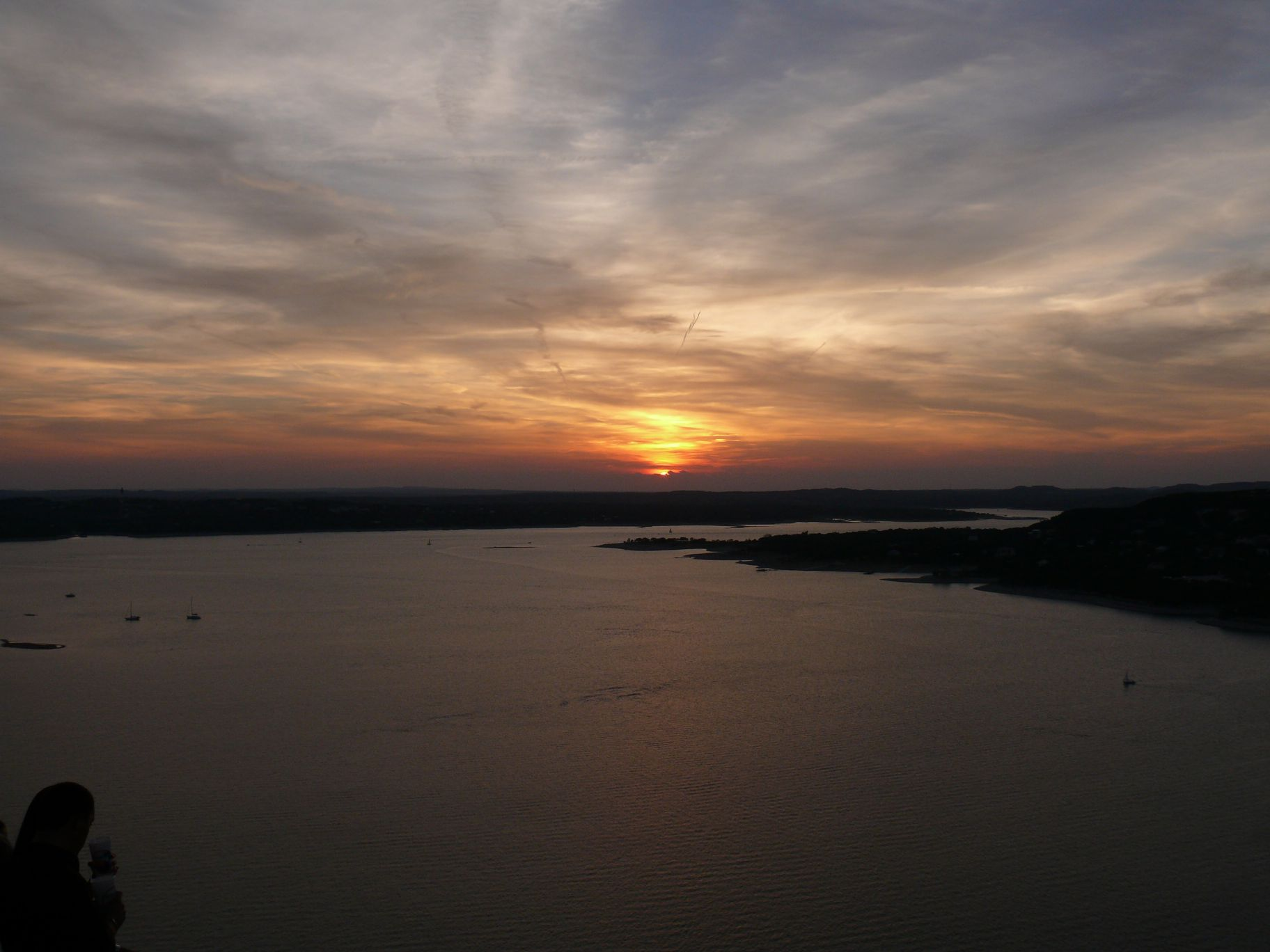
Sunset at Lake Travis, where the Lehmann family lived.

Lehmann married Ruth Preston Miller on October 12, 1940, whom he met while studying at the University of Wisconsin. A specialist in Celtic linguistics and Old English, Ruth was Professor of English at the University of Texas at Austin. Winfred and Ruth had two children, Terry Jon and Sandra Jean.

Winfred and Ruth were both environmentalists and animal-lovers. They donated 160 acres (0.65 km^{2}) of land in the northwest of Travis County, Texas to The Nature Conservancy to create the Ruth Lehmann Memorial Tract. The family inhabited a spacious house on Lake Travis, where they cared for rescued animals.

Aside from linguistics and the environment, Lehmann's great passion was literature, particularly early Germanic literature and the novels of his friend Raja Rao and James Joyce. He was also a skilled pianist. Lehmann was a close friend of John Archibald Wheeler, with whom he shared an interest for literature. Despite his wide circle of friends, Lehmann was nevertheless a very private man.

== Selected works ==
- (With Alfred Senn) A Word Index to Wolfram's "Parzival,", University of Wisconsin-Madison, 1938
- (With Roe-Merrill S. Heffner) A Word-Index to the Poems of Walther von der Vogelweide, University of Wisconsin-Madison, 1940
- (With Lloyd Faust) A Grammar of Formal Written Japanese, Harvard University Press, 1951
- Proto-Indo-European Phonology, University of Texas Press and Linguistic Society of America, (1952)
- The Alliteration of Old Saxon Poetry, Aschehoug, (1953)
- (With J. L. Dillard) The Alliterations of the Edda, University of Texas, 1954
- The Development of Germanic Verse Form, University of Texas Press and Linguistic Society of America, 1956
- (With Helmut Rheder and George Schulz-Behrend) Active German, Dryden, 1958, 2nd edition, including revised Handbook, records, and tapes, published as Active German Revised, Holt, 1962.
- (With Takemitsu Tabusa) The Alliterations of the Beowulf, Department of Germanic Languages, University of Texas, 1958
- (With Helmut Rehder, L. Shaw, and S. N. Werbow) Review and Progress in German, Holt, 1959
- (With Virginia F. Dailey) The Alliterations of the Christ, Guthlac, Elene, Juliana, Fates of the Apostles, and Dream of the Rood, Department of Germanic Languages, University of Texas, 1960.
- Historical Linguistics: An Introduction, Holt, 1962, 2nd edition 1973, 3rd edition, 1992
- Exercises to Accompany Historical Linguistics: An Introduction, Holt, 1962, 2nd edition, 1973.
- (With Helmut Rehder and Hans Beyer) Spectrum: Modern German Thought in Science, Literature, Philosophy and Art, Holt, 1964.
- (With H-J. Hewitt) Selected Vowel Measurements of American English Speech, University of Texas, 1965.
- Computational Linguistics: Procedures and Problems, Linguistics Research Center, University of Texas, 1965.
- (Editor and translator) A Reader in Nineteenth Century Historical Indo-European Linguistics, Indiana University Press, 1967.
- (Editor with Yakov Malkiel) Directions for Historical Linguistics: A Symposium, University of Texas Press, 1968.
- Descriptive Linguistics: An Introduction (includes Instructor's Manual), Random House, 1972, 2nd edition, 1976.
- (With T. J. O'Hare and Christoph Cobet) German: Language and Culture (includes student workbook and teacher's manual), Holt, 1972.
- Proto-Indo-European Syntax, University of Texas Press, 1974.
- (Editor) Language and Linguistics in the People's Republic of China, University of Texas Press, 1975.
- (R. P. M. Lehmann) An Introduction to Old Irish, Modern Language Association of America, 1975.
- (Editor) Syntactic Typology: Studies in the Phenomenology of Language, University of Texas Press, 1978
- Linguistische Theorien der Moderne, Peter Lang, 1981
- (Editor) Syntactic Typology, University of Texas Press, 1981
- Language: An Introduction, Random House, 1982
- (Editor with Yakov Malkiel) Perspectives on Historical Linguistics, Benjamins, 1982
- (Editor) Natural Language Processing, 1985
- (Editor) Language Typology 1985: Papers from the Linguistic Typology Symposium, Moscow, December 9–13, 1985, John Benjamins, 1985
- A Gothic Etymological Dictionary, Brill, 1986
- (Editor) Computers and Translation, 1986–1987
- (Editor) Language Typology, 1987: Systematic Balance in Language, Benjamins, 1990
- (Editor with Helen-Jo Jakusz Hewitt) Language Typology 1988: Typological Models in Reconstruction, Benjamins, 1991
- Die gegenwärtige Richtung der indogermanistischen Forschung, Archaeological Institute of the Academy of Sciences, 1992
- Theoretical Bases of Indo-European Linguistics, Routledge, 1993
- Residues of Pre-Indo-European Active Structure and their Implications for the Relationships among the Dialects, Institut für Sprachwissenschaft der Universität Innsbruck, 1995
- Theoretical Bases of Indo-European Linguistics, Routledge, 1996
- (With Esther Raizen and Helen-Jo Jakusz Hewitt) Biblical Hebrew: An Analytical Introduction, Wings Press, 1999
- Pre-Indo-European, Institute for the Study of Man, 2002

== Sources ==
- King, Robert D.; Salmons, Joseph C. (September 2008). "Winfred P. Lehmann". Language. 84 (3). Linguistic Society of America: 613–619. doi:10.1353/lan.0.0029. JSTOR 40071072. S2CID 143983615.
- "Winfred P(hilipp) Lehmann". Contemporary Authors. Gale. December 4, 2001.
- "Winfred P. Lehmann" (PDF). University of Texas at Austin. August 3, 2007. Archived from the original (PDF) on September 23, 2021.
- "Winfred Philip "Win" Lehmann". Austin American-Statesman. August 3, 2007. p. B4 – via Newspapers.com.
