= Bridget Drinka =

American linguist

- Born: 1951 (age 74–75)

Academic background
- Education: University of Texas at Austin
- Thesis: The Sigmatic Aorist in Indo-European (1990)
- Doctoral advisor: Edgar C. Polomé

Academic work
- Discipline: Linguistics
- Sub-discipline: Historical linguistics
- Institutions: University of Texas at Austin
- Main interests: Indo-European linguistics; Sociolinguistics
- Notable works: Language Contact in Europe, 2017

Bridget Drinka (born 1951) is an American linguist who specializes in Indo-European and historical linguistics. She is Professor of Linguistics at the University of Texas at San Antonio.

== Biography ==
Bridget Drinka received her B.A. (1973) from the University of Illinois at Urbana–Champaign, her M.S. (1977) from Georgetown University, and her Ph.D. (1990) from the University of Texas at Austin, specializing in Indo-European and historical linguistics. Drinka joined the faculty at UTSA in 1991, where she has since served as Assistant Professor (1991–1998), Associate Professor (1998–2012), and Professor of Linguistics (2012-).

Drinka was a Fulbright Senior Lecturer at Moscow State University in 1998, and has been a visiting professor in Germany, Italy, and Japan. Drinka was President of the International Society for Historical Linguistics from 2015 to 2017, and is Associate Editor of Folia Linguistica Historica. Her book Language Contact in Europe (2017) was awarded the Leonard Bloomfield Book Award for 2018 by the Linguistic Society of America.

== Selected works ==
- The Sigmatic Aorist in Indo-European, 1995
- Language Contact in Europe, 2017

== See also ==
- Winfred P. Lehmann
- Joseph C. Salmons
- Carol F. Justus
