= Carol F. Justus =

American linguist (1940–2007)

- Born: March 21, 1940
- Died: August 1, 2007 (aged 67); Austin, Texas

Academic background
- Education: University of Texas at Austin
- Doctoral advisor: Edgar C. Polomé

Academic work
- Discipline: Linguistics
- Sub-discipline: Indo-European linguistics
- Institutions: University of Texas at Austin

Carol F. Justus (March 21, 1940 – August 1, 2007) was an American linguist who specialized in Indo-European linguistics.

== Biography ==
Carol F. Justus was born on March 21, 1940, in Lodi, Ohio. She gained an A.B. in French in 1960 at King College, and an M.A. in Linguistics & Comparative Philology at the University of Minnesota in 1966. From 1967 to 1969, she studied at the Institute for Assyriology and Hittitology at LMU Munich. Justus received a Ph.D. in Indo-European linguistics at the University of Texas at Austin in 1973 under the supervision of Edgar C. Polomé. She was assistant professor (1973-1976) and associate professor (1976-1977) of linguistics at State University of New York (1973-1976). From 1982 to 1985, she was a research associate at the Linguistics Research Center at UT Austin, and then associate professor of linguistics at San Jose State University 1989 to 1994.

Since 1995, Justus served as Adjunct associate professor of classics and Middle Eastern studies at the Classics Department at the University of Texas at Austin. At Austin, Justus taught Indo-European studies, among other subjects. She was the author of more than 30 scholarly works. Justus served on the editorial board of the Journal of Indo-European Studies and as general editor of General Linguistics.

Justus died in Austin, Texas on August 1, 2007.

== Selected works ==
- Justus, Carol F.; Polomé, Edgar C., eds. (1999). Language change and typological variation : in honor of Winfred P. Lehmann on the occasion of his 83rd birthday. Washington, D.C.: Institute for the Study of Man. ISBN 9780941694698.

== See also ==
- Bridget Drinka
- Joe Salmons
- Winfred P. Lehmann
