= Bugarski =

Bugarski is a surname. Notable people with the surname include:

- Aleksandar Bugarski (1835–1891), Serbian architect
- Ranko Bugarski (1933–2024), Serbian linguist, academic, and author
- Vesna Bugarski (1930–1992), Bosnian architect
