= Seiichi Suzuki (philologist) =

Japanese philologist

- Born: 1956 (age 69–70)

Academic background
- Education: Osaka University; Nagoya University; University of Texas at Austin; University of York

Academic work
- Discipline: Philology
- Sub-discipline: Germanic philology
- Institutions: Chukyo University; Hiroshima University; Kansai Gaidai University
- Main interests: Gothic language; Old English literature; Old Norse literature

Seiichi Suzuki FSA (born 1956) is a Japanese philologist who is Professor of Old Germanic Studies at Kansai Gaidai University.

== Biography ==
Seiichi Suzuki gained a BA in English studies from Osaka University in 1979, a MA in English Language and Literature from Nagoya University in 1981, a PhD in Linguistics from University of Texas at Austin in 1986. His PhD was supervised by Winfred P. Lehmann and Edgar C. Polomé. Suzuki has later received an MA (1997) and D.Litt. (2015) in Medieval Studies from the University of York. His D.Litt. was supervised by Tania Dickinson.

From 1981 to 1987, Suzuki was Assistant Professor of English at Chukyo University. From 1987 to 1994, he was Assistant Professor, and then Associate Professor, of English and Linguistics at Hiroshima University. Since 1999, Suzuki has been Professor of Old Germanic Studies at Kansai Gaidai University.

Suzuki has served on the editorial board of The Interdisciplinary Journal for Germanic Linguistics and Semiotic Analysis (1996-), General Linguistics (2001-2007), Journal of Germanic Linguistics (2002-), NOWELE (2012-), Historical Linguistics in Japan (2012-2014), and Studia Metrica et Poetica (2013-). He is a Fellow of the Society of Antiquaries of London and a Member of the Institute for Advanced Study.

== Selected works ==
- The morphosyntax of detransitive suffixes -Þ- and -n- in Gothic, 1989
- The metrical organization of Beowulf, 1996
- The Quoit Brooch Style and Anglo-Saxon settlement, 2000
- The metre of Old Saxon poetry, 2004
- Anglo-Saxon button brooches, 2008
- The meters of Old Norse eddic poetry, 2014

== See also ==
- Robert D. Fulk
- Dennis Howard Green
