= Robert Harms =

Robert Harms may refer to:

- Robert Harms (historian) (born 1946), American historian
- Robert T. Harms (1932–2016), American linguist
