= Seiichi Suzuki =

Seiichi Suzuki may refer to:

- Seiichi Suzuki (figure skater) (鈴木 誠一, born 1976), Japanese figure skater
- Seiichi Suzuki (philologist) (born 1956), Japanese philologist
- Seiichi Suzuki (composer) (1901–1980), Japanese mandolinist and film score composer
- Seiichi Suzuki (racing driver) (?–1974), Japanese racing driver killed in a crash at the 1974 Fuji Grand Champion Series
