= Edgar C. Polomé =

Belgian-American scholar (1920–2000)

- Born: July 31, 1920; Molenbeek-Saint-Jean, Brussels, Belgium
- Died: March 11, 2000 (aged 79); Houston, Texas, U.S.
- Spouses: Julia Josephine Schwindt (m. 1944; died 1975) Barbara Elizabeth Baker Harris (m. 1980; div. 1990) Sharon Looper Rankin (m. 1991)
- Children: 2

Academic background
- Education: Free University of Brussels; Catholic University of Leuven
- Doctoral advisor: Adolphe Van Loey
- Influences: Georges Dumézil; Mircea Eliade; Émile Benveniste; Jan de Vries

Academic work
- Discipline: Linguistics; Philology; Religious studies
- Institutions: University of Texas at Austin
- Notable students: Joe Salmons; Bridget Drinka
- Main interests: Bantu linguistics; Comparative religion; Indo-European studies; Germanic studies; Sociolinguistics
- Notable works: Essays on Germanic Religion (1989)

Edgar Ghislain Charles Polomé (July 31, 1920 – March 11, 2000) was a Belgian-American philologist and religious studies scholar. He specialized in Germanic and Indo-European studies and was active at the University of Texas at Austin for much of his career.

Holding a PhD in Germanic philology from the Free University of Brussels, Polomé was professor and head of the Department of Linguistics at the Official University of the Congo and Ruanda-Urundi in the late 1950s and conducted research on Bantu languages. He subsequently served as a professor of comparative linguistics and religions at the University of Texas at Austin from 1962 to 1997. While a professor at Austin, Polomé co-founded the Journal of Indo-European Studies, of which he was an editor for many years.

Polomé was known as a specialist on Indo-European and Germanic religion. He was an author and editor of numerous scholarly publications, and the teacher of several students who subsequently became prominent scholars in his fields of study.

== Early life and education ==
Edgar C. Polomé was born in Molenbeek-Saint-Jean, a suburb of Brussels, Belgium, on July 31, 1920, the only child of Marcel Félicien Polomé and Berthe Henry. His father was a Walloon, and his mother was Flemish, but both of his parents spoke French at home. He spoke Dutch with the family maid.

Polomé attended a Dutch-language primary school, and received his secondary education at the French-language Athénée Royal de Koekelberg, where he immersed himself in classical philology and acquired proficiency in Latin, Greek, German and English, graduating as the best in his class. He would eventually acquire proficiency in a large number of languages, including several Italic (such as French, Italian and Latin), Germanic (such as Dutch, English, German, Swedish, Danish and Gothic), Indo-Iranian (such as Hindi, Sanskrit, Pali, Avestan and Old Persian), Celtic, Baltic and Bantu languages (particularly Swahili), and Greek and Hittite.

After winning a scholarship, Polomé entered the Free University of Brussels to study Germanic philology. Passing his freshman exams with the highest distinction, Polomé was conscripted into the Belgian Armed Forces during the Battle of Belgium. He subsequently resumed his studies, receiving a candidature (roughly equivalent to a bachelor's degree) in Germanic philology in 1941. The Free University of Brussels was closed by the German occupiers in 1942. In 1943, Polomé gained a licenciate (roughly equivalent to a master's degree) in Germanic philology at the University of Louvain. While gaining his licenciate he also worked on Sanskrit and Indology with Étienne Lamotte. During this time, Polomé developed a strong interest in the comparative study of religions and cultures, which he would maintain for the rest of his life. Since his youth, Polomé had been deeply interested in Germanic religion. Inspired by the pioneering research of Georges Dumézil, Polomé aimed towards specializing in the comparative study of Germanic religion, but this ambition was shattered by stigma associated with the topic in the aftermath of World War II.

After the end of World War II in Europe, Polomé joined the United States Army as an interpreter in Germany. He combined his work for the Americans with the study of Celtic. Returning to Belgium Polomé re-enrolled at the University of Brussels, completing his PhD degree in Germanic philology in 1949 with the highest distinction. His PhD thesis was on the laryngeal theory of Indo-European linguistics, and was supervised by Adolphe Van Loey. During his research for the dissertation, Polomé came in contact with the foremost scholars on Indo-European linguistics of the day, including Dumézil, Julius Pokorny, Émile Benveniste, Jerzy Kuryłowicz and Winfred P. Lehmann. He also became greatly interested in the research of the Romanian historian of religion Mircea Eliade. The works of Dumézil in particular would have very strong influence on Polomé, who became one of Dumézil's most consistent supporters. Dumézil, Benveniste and Eliade would remain lifelong friends of Polomé. While working for his PhD, Polomé got involved with the Théonoé group established by Henri Grégoire at the Royal Library of Belgium, where he acquired new perspectives on Germanic religion.

== Early career ==
From 1942 to 1956, Polomé taught Germanic languages on a non-regular basis at the Athénée Adolphe Max in Brussels. From 1954 to 1956 he taught Dutch at the Belgian Broadcasting Corporation. Polomé was subsequently appointed to the faculty of the Official University of the Congo and Ruanda-Urundi in Élisabethville (now Lubumbashi), Belgian Congo. Here he established its Department of Linguistics. The department was the most advanced of its kind in Africa at the time and conducted pioneering research on the Bantu languages.

While in Congo, Polomé published a number of works on Swahili; he was interested in the relationship between language and culture, which made him turn to fields such as modern sociolinguistics. Polomé would become well remembered for his research on Bantu linguistics. His Swahili Language Handbook (1967) was in use at universities for many decades.

== Career at the University of Texas at Austin ==
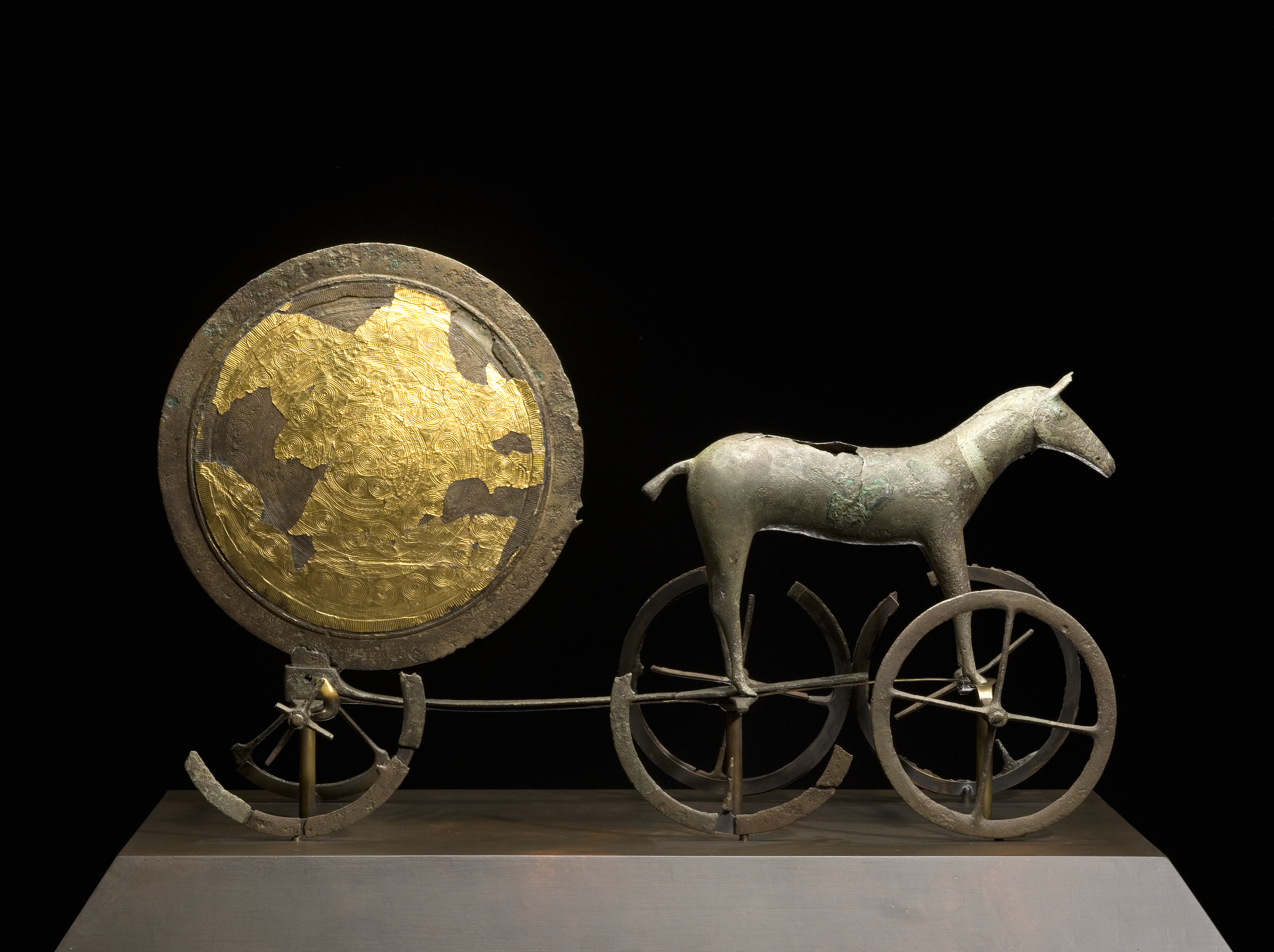
Gilded side of the Trundholm sun chariot, an object from the Nordic Bronze Age. Polomé was interested in Germanic religion and its Indo-European components.

In 1960, the Republic of the Congo was proclaimed, leading to the Congo Crisis. Polomé fled as a refugee to Southern Rhodesia. Winfred P. Lehmann then invited him to the University of Texas at Austin, where the absence of Werner Winter gave him the opportunity to teach Hindi, Latin, Hittite and other languages as a visiting professor for one semester. At Austin, Polomé became acquainted with the Old Norse specialist Lee M. Hollander, who encouraged Polomé to resume his research on Germanic religion. In 1962 Polomé was appointed a tenured professor at the Department of Germanic Languages at Austin. This department was not limited to Germanic languages, but covered many other aspects of linguistics as well. His teaching was particularly devoted to Indo-European and Germanic studies, linguistics and African languages. He taught courses in a number of departments, including the departments for anthropology, classics, linguistics, foreign language education and Germanic languages. Topics on which he taught included historical linguistics, comparative linguistics, sociolinguistics, comparative religions and the history of religion. In linguistics, languages Polomé taught at Austin included Sanskrit, Pali, Hittite, Avestan and Old Persian, and the comparative grammar of Indo-Iranian, Greek, Latin, Germanic, Celtic, Baltic and Bantu languages (particularly Swahili). He also taught courses in ancient Germanic culture and religion, and Indo-European culture and religion. Among his students at Austin, Polomé became well known for his extensive knowledge and eclectic approach to scholarly problems. Notable students on whom Polomé had a strong influence include Joseph C. Salmons and Bridget Drinka, who became prominent scholars in the field themselves.

Polomé's research centered particularly on Indo-European and Germanic studies, and Bantu languages. He was known for his interdisciplinary approach, and was interested in linguistics, culture and religion. His most important contributions were to the study of the language, culture and history of the Germanic peoples. Questions examined by Polomé in this regard include Celtic-Germanic relations, and the Indo-European components in Germanic languages and culture. He conducted extensive work on Germanic religion. Polomé was the author and editor of several books, and authored hundreds of articles and reviews for scholarly journals. Throughout his career, Polomé was a member of numerous learned societies, including the American Oriental Society, the Association for Asian Studies, African Studies Association, Linguistic Society of America, the American Anthropological Association, the Modern Language Association of America, Société de Linguistique de Paris, and the Indogermanische Gesellschaft.

Polomé was director of the Center for Asian Studies at Austin from 1962 to 1972. He gained American citizenship in 1966. In 1968 he was granted a Fulbright professorship in Kiel, Germany. In the following year he edited Old Norse Literature and Mythology (1969). This volume was a collection of papers presented at symposium organized in honor of Polomé colleague Lee M. Hollander.

Along with Lehmann, Polomé was instrumental in the creation of the Department of Linguistics and the Department of Oriental and African Languages and Literature (DOALL) at Austin, which was established in 1969 with Polomé as chairman (1969–1976). In 1969–1970 he stayed in Tanzania with a grant from the Ford Foundation and again surveyed African languages. Based at the University of Dar es Salaam, where he was a visiting professor, Polomé also helped to improve the linguistics programs at the University of Nairobi during this period.

Animated map of Indo-European migrations in accordance with the Kurgan hypothesis. Much of Polomé's research centered on Indo-European studies.

From 1972 to 1978, Polomé was chairman of the Language Committee of the American Institute of Indian Studies. Together with the archaeologist Marija Gimbutas, Polomé co-founded the Journal of Indo-European Studies (JIES) in 1973. At JIES, Polomé served from the beginning as mythology editor, was responsible for linguistics, and was made managing editor in 1987. In 1995, Polomé launched the JIES Book Chronicle, which reviews books of interest to Indo-European studies. Together with A. Richard Diebold Jr., Polomé co-edited the Journal of Indo-European Studies Monograph Series. Polomé was a friend of J. P. Mallory, who would eventually assume many of his duties at the journal. Polomé was a co-editor of Mankind Quarterly, which like the JIES is published by the anthropologist Roger Pearson. Polomé was a member of the patronage committee of Nouvelle École, which is the journal of Alain de Benoist's Nouvelle Droite think tank GRECE. While Pearson and Benoist have been associated with far-right politics, Polomé has not.

Polomé's Language, Society and Paleoculture (1982) examined the relationships between culture and language in ancient societies. In 1985, Polomé was appointed Christie and Stanley E. Adams Jr. Centennial professor at the College of Liberal Arts at University of Texas at Austin. Polomé contributed a number of articles to Mircea Eliade's monumental Encyclopedia of Religion (1986–1987). A Festschrift for Polomé was published by Mouton de Gruyter in 1988. The next year, his Essays on Germanic Religion (1989) was published. It represented the culmination of a lifetime of research on Germanic religion by Polomé, and was intended by him to be an incentive for the publication of a revision of Jan de Vries's monumental Altgermanische Religionsgeschichte. In 1990, Polomé organized Perspectives on the Ancient Indo-European World, which was an international seminar funded by the National Endowment for the Humanities. In the following years, Polomé authored and edited a number of works on historical linguistics, including Research Guide to Language Change (1990), and Reconstructing Languages and Cultures (1992). A second Festschrift for Polomé was published in two volumes as part of the JIES monograph series in 1991.

Polomé suffered a stroke in 1993, and was left paralyzed on his left side. He retired from his administrative duties as professor emeritus in 1997, but nevertheless remained a prolific author and editor.

== Personal life ==
Polomé married Julia Schwindt in on July 22, 1944. They had two children, Andre Polomé and Monique Polomé Ellsworth. Julia died on May 27, 1975. On July 11, 1980, Polomé married Barbara Baker Harris. They divorced on January 29, 1990. On February 8, 1991, Polomé married his third wife Sharon Looper Rankin, with whom he lived until his death.

Polomé died of osteosarcoma at the University of Texas MD Anderson Cancer Center in Houston, Texas, on March 11, 2000. He was survived by his wife Sharon, his son Andre, his daughter Monique, two grandchildren, and two great-grandchildren. A third Festschrift intended for Polomé's 80th birthday, was published posthumously as a Gedenkschrift in three volumes.

== Selected works ==
- (Contributor) Evidence for Laryngeals, Mouton & Co., 1965.
- (Contributor) Ancient Indo-European Dialects, University of California Press, 1966.
- Swahili Language Handbook, Center for Applied Linguistics, 1967.
- (Contributor) Language Problems of Developing Nations, Wiley, 1968.
- (Editor and Contributor) Old Norse Literature and Mythology: A Symposium, University of Texas Press, 1969.
- (Contributor) Indo-European and Indo-Europeans, University of Pennsylvania Press, 1970.
- (Contributor) Myth and Law among the Indo-Europeans, University of California Press, 1970.
- (Contributor) Language Use and Social Change, Oxford University Press, 1971.
- (Contributor) Pidginization and Creolization of Languages, Cambridge University Press, 1971.
- (Contributor) Toward a Grammar of Proto-Germanic, Niemeyer, 1972.
- (Contributor) Myth in Indo-European Antiquity, University of California Press, 1974.
- (Co-editor with Alfred Collins) Proceedings of the 1974 Annual Meeting of the Southwest Conference on Asian Studies, S.W.C.A.S., 1975.
- (Co-editor with Sirarpi Ohannessian and Charles Ferguson, and Contributor) Language Surveys in the Developing Nations, Center for Applied Linguistics, 1975.
- (Co-editor with M. A. Jazayery and Winter) Linguistic and Literary Studies in Honor of Archibald A. Hill, Peter de Ridder, 1976.
- (Co-editor with Alfred Collins) Proceedings of the 1975 Annual Meeting of the Southwest Conference on Asian Studies, S.W.C.A.S., 1976
- (Editor) Proceedings of the 1976 Annual Meeting of the Southwest Conference on Asian Studies, Austin College Press, 1977
- (Editor) Proceedings of the 1977 Annual Meeting of the Southwest Conference on Asian Studies, S.A.R.C., 1978
- (Editor and Contributor) Man and the Ultimate: A Symposium, American Oriental Society, 1980.
- (Co-editor with C. P. Hill, and Contributor) Language in Tanzania, Oxford University Press, 1980.
- (Editor and Contributor) The Indo-Europeans in the Fourth and Third Millennia, Karoma, 1982.
- Language, Society and Paleoculture (Essays), Stanford University Press, 1982.
- (Editor) Homage to Georges Dumézil, Institute for the Study of Man, 1982.
- (Editor and Contributor) Essays in Memory of Karl Kerényi, Institute for the Study of Man, 1984.
- (Co-editor with Sysan Nacev Skomal, and Contributor) Proto-Indo-European: the Archaeology of a Linguistic Problem: Studies in Honor of Marija Gimbutas, Institute for the Study of Man, 1987.
- Essays on Germanic Religion, Institute for the Study of Man, 1989.
- (Editor) Research Guide on Language Change, Mouton de Gruyter, 1990.
- (Co-editor with Werner Winter) Reconstructing Languages and Cultures, Mouton de Gruyter, 1992.
- (Contributor) Proceedings of the Seventh Annual UCLA Indo-European Conference, Los Angeles 1995, Institute for the Study of Man, 1995.
- (Editor and Contributor) Indo-European Religion after Dumézil, Institute for the Study of Man, 1996.
- (Co-editor and Contributor) Studies in Honor of Jaan Puhvel, Institute for the Study of Man, 1997.
- (Co-editor with Miriam Robbins Dexter, and Contributor) "Varia" on the Indo-European Past: Papers in Memory of Marija Gimbutas, Institute for the Study of Man, 1997.
- (Co-editor with Carol F. Justus, and Contributor) Language Change and Typological Variation: in Honor of Wilfred P. Lehmann on the Occasion of his 83rd Birthday, Institute for the Study of Man, 1999.
- (Editor and Contributor) Miscellanea Indo-Europea, Institute for the Study of Man, 1999.

== See also ==
- René Derolez, scholar of Germanic religion
- Hermann Güntert, scholar of Germanic and Indo-European religion
- C. Scott Littleton, scholar of Indo-European religion
- Rudolf Much, scholar of Germanic religion
- Ernst Alfred Philippson, scholar of Anglo-Saxon paganism
- Jaan Puhvel, scholar of Indo-European religion
- Rudolf Simek, scholar of Germanic religion
- Franz Rolf Schröder, scholar of Germanic and Indo-European religion
- Gabriel Turville-Petre, scholar of Old Norse religion
- Stig Wikander, scholar of Indo-European religion

== Sources ==
- Bello, Remi (March 23, 2000). "UT mourns Polomé" (PDF). The Daily Texan. p. 5. Archived from the original (PDF) on September 5, 2019.
- Drinka, Bridget, ed. (2000). "Dedication". Studies in Memory of Edgar C. Polomé. American Journal of Germanic Linguistics and Literatures. Vol. 12. Cambridge University Press. pp. 177–179.
- Duranton-Crabol, Anne-Marie (1988). Visages de la Nouvelle droite : le GRECE et son histoire [Faces of the New Right: GRECE and its history] (in French). Paris: Presses de Sciences Po. ISBN 978-2-7246-0561-7.
- Elst, Koenraad (1999). Update on the Aryan Invasion Debate. Aditya Prakashan. ISBN 8186471774.
- Jazayery, Mohammad Ali (1988). "Edgar C. Polomé: A Biographical Sketch". In Jazayery, Mohammad Ali; Winter, Werner (eds.). Languages and Cultures: Studies in Honor of Edgar C. Polomé. Trends in Linguistics. Vol. 36. Mouton de Gruyter. pp. 1–2. ISBN 0-899-25-442-X.
- Littleton, C. Scott (1973). The New Comparative Mythology: An Anthropological Assessment of the Theories of Georges Dumézil (2 ed.). University of California Press. ISBN 0-520-02403-6.
- Louden, Mark L.; Justus, Carol F.; King, Robert D. (Fall 2000). "In Memoriam: Edgar Charles Polomé" (PDF). American Journal of Germanic Linguistics. 12 (2). Cambridge University Press: 181–186. doi:10.1017/S1040820700002675. Archived from the original (PDF) on September 5, 2019.
- Pearson, Robert (2000). "In Memoriam". Journal of Indo-European Studies. 28 (1): 1–2. ProQuest 206746250.
- Polomé, Edgar C., ed. (1989). Essays on Germanic Religion. Journal of Indo-European Studies Monograph Series. Vol. 6. Institute for the Study of Man. ISBN 0-941694-34-8. ISSN 0895-7258.
- Tucker, William H. (2002). Jazayery (ed.). The Funding of Scientific Racism: Wickliffe Draper and the Pioneer Fund. Trends in Linguistics. University of Illinois Press. ISBN 0-252-02762-0.
- "Long Trail Brings Him To UT Post". Austin American-Statesman. March 2000.
- "Edgar Charles Polomé" (PDF). Austin American-Statesman. March 2000. Archived from the original (PDF) on September 5, 2019.
- "Edgar C. Polomé" (PDF). University of Texas at Austin. Archived from the original (PDF) on September 5, 2019.
- "Edgar (Ghislain) C(harles) Polome". Gale Literature: Contemporary Authors. Gale. May 6, 2001.
