= Katarzyna Dziubalska-Kołaczyk =

Polish linguist

- Born: May 27, 1960 (age 65)
- Education: Adam Mickiewicz University (PhD)
- Scientific career
- Fields: linguistics
- Institutions: Adam Mickiewicz University
- Thesis: A Theory of Second Language Acquisition within the Framework of Natural Phonology – a Polish-English Contrastive Study (1988)

Katarzyna Dziubalska-Kołaczyk (born May 27, 1960) is a Polish linguist and professor of English linguistics at Adam Mickiewicz University, Poznań, Poland. She is the editor-in-chief of Poznań Studies in Contemporary Linguistics. A festschrift in her honor titled Approaches to the Study of Sound Structure and Speech. Interdisciplinary Work in Honour of Katarzyna Dziubalska-Kołaczyk edited by Magdalena Wrembel, Agnieszka Kiełkiewicz-Janowiak, and Piotr Gąsiorowski was published in 2020 by Routledge.

== Life ==
In 1979, she won the award of the University of Adam Mickiewicz in Poznań, taking part in the English Language Olympiad for high school students. In the years 1979–1983 she studied English philology at the Institute of English Studies at the Adam Mickiewicz University. In 1996–1999, she was the Deputy Director for Scientific Research at the Institute of English Studies (IFA) at the Adam Mickiewicz University. Since 1997 she is the head of the English Department at IFA. She was the first deputy director at the Institute of English Studies twice during the 1999–2002 and 2002–2005 terms. She is the founder and head of the Interdisciplinary Center for Speech and Language Processing (CSLP) at the University of Adam Mickiewicz. During the years 2005–2012 she was the director of the Institute of English Studies at AMU.

Since 2005, she is a member of the Language Theory subcommittee of the Linguistics Committee of the Polish Academy of Sciences. she was a member of the Linguistics Committee of the Polish Academy of Sciences during the 2007–2010 term. On January 24, 2011, Barbara Kudrycka, Polish Minister of Science and Higher Education, appointed Dziubalska-Kołaczyk to the Advisory Team of the Council of the National Program for the Development of Humanities. In 2012, she was elected dean of the newly created Faculty of English at the University of Adam Mickiewicz in Poznań for the 2012–2016 term, and in 2016 she was re-elected for the 2016–2020 term. In 2011, she was nominated a member of the Philological Committee of the Wrocław Branch of the Polish Academy of Sciences and the Linguistics Committee of the Polish Academy of Sciences for the 2011–2014 term. In 2012, she became the president of the Societas Linguistica Europaea for 2013 (as the third person from Poland).
