= Teresa Fanego =

Spanish historical linguist of English

Teresa Fanego is a Spanish linguist specializing in the history of English.

== Education, career and honours ==
Fanego initially studied Germanic philology at the University of Santiago de Compostela, receiving her PhD in English linguistics from the same institution in 1978 after a year spent studying at University College London on a British Council scholarship (1975–76). She has spent her whole career at the University of Santiago de Compostela, first as lecturer, then as associate professor (from 1984) and finally as full professor (from 1990).

Between 2005 and 2013, Fanego served as editor-in-chief of the Societas Linguistica Europaea's journal Folia Linguistica. In 2017 she was elected member of the Academia Europaea. In 2018 she was the recipient of a double festschrift containing contributions by David Denison and Raymond Hickey among many others.

== Research ==
Fanego's research has focused on the history of English, with a special focus on syntax, Early Modern English, and the language of Shakespeare. She was an early adopter of corpus-linguistic methods in historical linguistics, with research interests in corpus design, compilation and types as well as corpus-based studies of grammatical variation. Her work on the development of the English gerund is widely cited. She has further research interests in the morphosyntax of contemporary English, grammaticalization, discourse analysis, cognitive linguistics, and construction grammar.

== Selected publications ==
- Fanego, Teresa. 1990. Finite complement clauses in Shakespeare's English, I. Studia Neophilologica 62 (1), 3-21. doi:10.1080/00393279008588036
- Fanego, Teresa. 1996. The development of gerunds as objects of subject-control verbs in English (1400-1760). Diachronica 13 (1), 29–62. doi:10.1075/dia.13.1.03fan
- Fanego, Teresa. 1996. The gerund in early Modern English: evidence from the Helsinki Corpus. Folia Linguistica Historica 30, 97–152. doi:10.1515/flih.1996.17.1-2.97
- Fanego, Teresa. 2004. On reanalysis and actualization in syntactic change: The rise and development of English verbal gerunds. Diachronica 21 (1), 5-55. doi:10.1075/dia.21.1.03fan
- Fanego, Teresa. 2012. Motion events in English: The emergence and diachrony of manner salience from Old English to Late Modern English. Folia Linguistica Historica 46, 29–86. doi:10.1515/flih.2012.003
