= Monica Macaulay =

Linguist

- Born: 1955 (age 70–71)
- Occupation: Linguist
- Spouse: Joe Salmons

Academic background
- Education: University of California, Berkeley

Academic work
- Institutions: University of Wisconsin–Madison
- Main interests: Morphology, Endangered languages, Linguistic typology

Monica Macaulay (born 1955) is an American linguist at the University of Wisconsin–Madison affiliated with the American Indian Studies Program.

== Biography ==
During her teenage years, Macaulay attended high school in Santiago, Chile, where she learned Spanish. After graduating high school and traveling South America, she moved to Prescott, Arizona. She relocated shortly after to northern California and pursued art school before enrolling at UC Berkeley.

Macaulay received her PhD in 1987 for her research on morphology and cliticization in Chalcatongo Mixtec at the University of California, Berkeley.

She has worked on documenting various Indigenous languages of North America, especially Menominee and Potawatomi. She has published a number of linguistic studies on, especially, the syntax and semantics of the Mixtec, Karuk and Algonquian languages. She has also written a grammar of Chalcatongo Mixtec (Macaulay 1996). From 2006 to 2010, she led an NSF grant which aimed to write three dictionaries for Menominee. The grant resulted in works including Macaulay (2009, 2012).

She has written a survival skills manual for graduate students in linguistics (Macaulay 2011).

Macaulay is married to linguist Joe Salmons.

== Honors ==
In 2020, Macaulay was inducted as a Fellow of the Linguistic Society of America.

Macaulay is currently the president of the Endangered Language Fund, as well as the co-editor of the Papers of the Algonquian Conference.

Since 1996, she has been the project director for the Women in Linguistics Mentoring Alliance (WILMA), a project of the Linguistic Society of America.

== Key publications ==
- Macaulay, Monica, Salmons, J. 2017. Synchrony and diachrony in Menominee derivational morphology. Morphology 27, 179–215. https://doi.org/10.1007/s11525-016-9299-y
- Brugman, Claudia M. & Macaulay, Monica. 2015. Characterizing evidentiality. Linguistic Typology 19, no. 2, pp. 201–237. https://doi.org/10.1515/lingty-2015-0007
- (2014) Macaulay, M. Ézhe-bmadzimgek gdebodwéwadmi-zheshmomenan: Potawatomi Dictionary. (Co-compiled with Lindsay Marean, Laura Welcher, and Kimberly Wensaut; self-published with Forest County Potawatomi Community.)
- (2012) Macaulay, M. Menominee Dictionary (Self-published with Menominee Tribe of Wisconsin.)
- (2011) Macaulay, M. Surviving Linguistics: A Guide for Graduate Students (second edition). Somerville, MA: Cascadilla Press. (First edition 2006.) ISBN 978-1-57473-029-6
- (2009) Macaulay, M. A Beginner's Dictionary of Menominee. (Co-compiled with Marianne Milligan; self-published with Menominee Tribe of Wisconsin.)
- (1996) Macaulay, M. A Grammar of Chalcatongo Mixtec. (Grammar with texts and dictionary; 298 pp.) University of California Publications in Linguistics, Vol. 127. Berkeley, Los Angeles: University of California Press. ISBN 0-520-09807-2
