= Tauno Frans Mustanoja =

Finnish philologist and scholar (1912–1996)

Mustanoja in 1990

Tauno Frans Mustanoja (1912–1996) was a professor of English Philology and Literature at the University of Helsinki, Finland. He was a philologist and scholar of Medieval and Middle English. He was also a major influence in initiating what became the widespread study and use of the English language in Finland.

== Early life ==
Mustanoja was born in Tampere, Finland, in 1912. He studied modern and classical languages and modern literature at the University of Helsinki. He graduated in 1938 and then studied at the University of Cambridge in 1938–1939, taking post-graduate courses in medieval literature and textual criticism.

== Career ==
=== Military ===
Shortly after his return to Finland, Mustanoja's career as a teacher, academic and writer was interrupted by the Second World War. He fought in both the Winter War (1939–40) and the Continuation War (1941–45) and was promoted to the rank of lieutenant.

=== Academe ===
After the Continuation War, Mustanoja returned to the University of Helsinki and resumed his teaching, research and studies. His doctoral dissertation, The Good Wife Taught Her Daughter, an edition of three Late Middle English poems, was accepted at the University of Helsinki in 1948 with the highest grade. This led, in the same year, to his also receiving recognition as a docent in English Philology at the university. He became Associate Professor in 1957.

In 1961, he was appointed to the chair of English Philology at the University of Helsinki following the publication of A Middle English Syntax, Volume I (1960). The Syntax was regarded as a breakthrough work of scholarship in the field of Middle English studies. It was a result of Mustanoja's research concentrating on the history of English and, in particular, in the field of Middle English, wherein he became recognised as an international expert. The Syntax remains a basic reference work for scholars of Middle English and the history of the English language. It combines thorough familiarity with earlier research and profound analysis of the structural features of the language and a sensitivity to the finest nuances of meaning. In this way, the Syntax sets an example, even today, for philologists and historical linguists. A Middle English Syntax, with an introduction by Elly van Gelderen, is available through John Benjamins Publishing Company.

Mustanoja's scholarship brought him international renown. He was an Honorary Member of the Modern Language Association of America, Fellow of the Medieval Academy of America, Fellow of the British Academy, Member of the Royal Society of Letters in Lund, Sweden, and a Member of the Finnish Academy of Science and Letters. He received the Honorary Award of the Emil Aaltonen Foundation in 1962.

Mustanoja was also the chairman and Honorary Member of the Modern Language Society in Finland. He was a long time Editor of the society's publications, and during his editorship Neuphilologische Mitteilungen established its position as an internationally recognised scholarly journal specialising in English, German and Romance language philologies.

==== The English language in Finland ====
In the period immediately following the Second World War, English was little known in Finland and much less popular than German or French. Mustanoja's pioneering work in the study of medieval English literature ran parallel to his leadership in bringing modern English to Finland. Through both his teaching and translations, he influenced and helped to promote the study and growth of both the English language and modern English and American literature.

He also worked in many ways to strengthen the cultural and scholarly relations between Finland and the English-speaking world. For over three decades, Mustanoja was chairman of the board of the United States Educational Foundation in Finland (the Fulbright Program). He was also Chairman of the British Council Scholars’ Association and the Finnish American Society. In addition, Mustanoja was appointed visiting professor of Middle English at UCLA in 1965–66.

In 1955–56, Mustanoja worked with Philip Durham, professor of English at UCLA, and a visiting Fulbright Professor of American Literature at Helsinki University. In 1960, they published an extensive monograph, American Fiction in Finland. The study dealt with the reception of American literature in Finland and ranged from the nineteenth century to 1958. It included the Finnish reception on several levels of many American writers including Melville, Poe, Lewis, London, and Steinbeck.

In 1963, Francis Peabody Magoun, distinguished Professor of English, Harvard University, in the foreword to his celebrated translation into English of the Finnish national epic The Kalevala credits Mustanoja with "profoundest appreciation and gratitude for his support and insights".

Although Mustanoja was primarily a language historian, he was also recognised as a scholar of world literature. In this area, he published articles on a wide range of authors, including Chaucer, Shakespeare, Longfellow, Maugham, Franςois Villon and Henry James. He also translated several works by these and other authors into Finnish. Mustanoja was also recognised as an authority on medieval art.

==== University of Helsinki ====
Tauno Mustanoja was highly esteemed as a teacher. His lectures combined the analysis of language with relevant observations about medieval literature, society and culture. He was an inspiring supervisor of young scholars and his support and advice often extended beyond scholarly questions. He was, however, uncompromising in his demand for high standards of research and intellectual honesty.

Tauno Mustanoja held the post of chair of English Philology at the University of Helsinki until his retirement in 1975; his students included Matti Kilpiö. After retirement, Mustanoja continued his scholarly work, concentrating particularly on the second volume of A Middle English Syntax.

Merciless disease interrupted his research activity. His last book, a collection of essays called Runo ja kulkuri ( 'The Poem and the Vagabond', 1981 ), contains a fine analysis of Western literature and civilisation ranging from classical antiquity through Medieval Europe to Renaissance England.

Following his death, the University of Helsinki established the Tauno F. Mustanoja Library. Even today, research of English at the University of Helsinki is influenced by Tauno Mustanoja's view of language as an evolving means of human communication, influenced not only by internal processes of change but also by cultural, social and textual factors.
