= Anna Giacalone Ramat =

Italian linguist (born 1937)

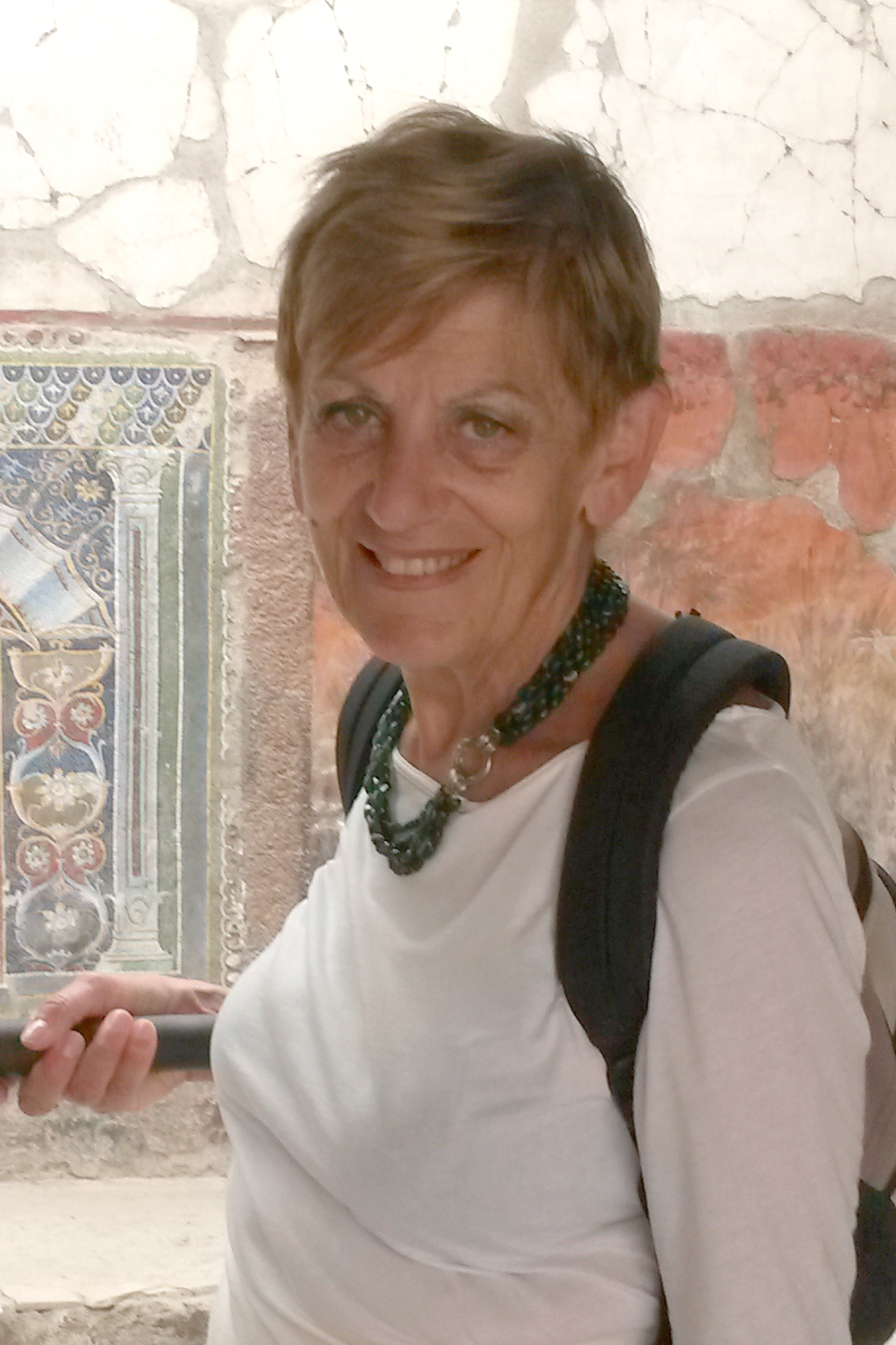
- Education: University of Florence
- Known for: research on grammaticalization and language acquisition
- Scientific career
- Fields: Linguistics
- Workplaces: University of Cagliari (1962–1975); University of Pavia (1976–2010)

Anna Giacalone Ramat, born Anna Giacalone in Forlì, Italy, 17 June 1937, is an Italian linguist known for her work on grammaticalization and language acquisition.

== Biography ==
Anna Giacalone graduated from the University of Florence in 1959, subsequently studying Indo-European linguistics, Sanskrit and Germanic linguistics at the University of Würzburg and Saarland University, before taking up a position as teaching assistant (1962–1968) and then assistant professor (1968–1975) at the University of Cagliari. During the 1970s she held professorial positions at the University of Messina and the University of Milan; she spent most of her career as full professor at the University of Pavia, first in glottology (1976–1996) and then in general linguistics (1996–2010). She retired in 2010.

Giacalone Ramat has been the recipient of numerous honours and awards. In 1987 she held a Fulbright visiting scholarship at UCLA. She has served as President of the International Society for Historical Linguistics (1983–1985), of the Società Italiana di Glottologia (1991–1992), and of the Societas Linguistica Europaea (1999–2000). In 2008 she was the recipient of a festschrift. In 2016 she was elected member of the Academia Europaea, and in the same year she and her husband Paolo Ramat were awarded honorary membership of the Societas Linguistica Europaea in recognition of their decades-long service to the community.

== Research ==
Giacalone Ramat has published widely on historical linguistics, psycholinguistics, grammaticalization, sociolinguistics, and language acquisition, with expertise on the Romance, Greek, Latin and Germanic languages.

In 1986, in collaboration with other colleagues, Giacalone Ramat initiated a project on non-native varieties of Italian. This became known as the "Project of Pavia" and showed how observing the process of acquisition of Italian as L2 can make a significant contribution to a theory of language and to the understanding of the universal regularities that shape it. She also played an important role in bringing Italian acquisitional research into contact with European research networks on L2, starting from the 1990s, in particular with the network of the European project "The structure of learner varieties" coordinated by the Max Planck Institute for Psycholinguistics, Nijmegen. Her historical work has dealt with the diachronic development of interphrasal connectives, changes in passive and impersonal constructions in Romance languages, and new perspectives in the theory of grammaticalization.

== Selected publications ==
- Giacalone Ramat, Anna. 1986. L'apprendimento spontaneo di una seconda lingua. Bologna: Il Mulino. ISBN 9788815006745
- Giacalone Ramat, Anna (ed.). 1988. L'italiano tra le altre lingue: strategie di acquisizione. Bologna: Il Mulino. ISBN 9788815016553
- Giacalone Ramat, Anna. 1995. Code-switching in the context of dialect/standard language relations. In Lesley Milroy & Pieter Muysken (eds.), One speaker, two languages: Crossdisciplinary perspectives on code-switching, 45–67. Cambridge: Cambridge University Press.
- Giacalone Ramat, Anna. 1998. Testing the boundaries of grammaticalization. In Giacalone Ramat & Hopper (eds.), 107–128. doi:10.1075/tsl.37.05gia
- Giacalone Ramat, Anna, and Paul J. Hopper (eds.). 1998. The limits of grammaticalization. Amsterdam: John Benjamins. ISBN 9789027275578
- Giacalone Ramat, Anna, and Paolo Ramat (eds.). The Indo-European languages. London: Routledge. ISBN 9780203880647
