= Matti Rissanen =

Finnish professor emeritus (1937-2018)

Matti Juhani Rissanen (23 June 1937 in Viipuri – 24 January 2018 in Vantaa) was a Finnish professor emeritus and researcher in English linguistics. Rissanen worked at the University of Helsinki as a docent of English philology 1969–1970, an assistant professor 1970–1977 and as a professor 1977–2001. He was also chair of the university's language centre.

1991 saw the publication of the Helsinki Corpus of English Texts, a seminal English-language corpus of historical texts, of which Rissanen was editor-in-chief. He has been characterised accordingly as 'a pioneer in English historical corpus linguistics'.

In 1995, Rissanen founded, and became the first director of, the English linguistics research unit Varieng at the University of Helsinki, and in 1998 was president of the Societas Linguistica Europaea.

He received a range of honours and awards. He became an honorary doctor at the University of Uppsala, Sweden (2001); was elected to the Finnish Academy of Science and Letters; and he became an honorary member of the Modern Language Society (2005), the International Society of Anglo-Saxonists, and the Japan Association for English Corpus Studies (2006). In 2012, Rissanen received the Alfred Kordelin Prize, comprising a €30,000 research grant.

In the recollection of his former student and colleague Matti Kilpiö, Rissanen's 'optimism [...] was infectious, his energy unfailing'.

== Major works ==
- The uses of one in Old and Early Middle English, PhD thesis. 1967
- Problems in the translation of Shakespeare's imagery into Finnish : with special reference to Macbeth. Mémoires de la Société néophilologique de Helsinki 36. Helsinki 1971
- Corpus-based studies of diachronic English, ed. by Roberta Facchinetti and Matti Rissanen. Lang, Bern - New York 2006
