= Poznań Studies in Contemporary Linguistics =

- Discipline: General linguistics
- Language: English
- Edited by: Katarzyna Dziubalska-Kolaczyk

Publication details
- History: 2011-present
- Publisher: De Gruyter
- Frequency: Quarterly
- Open access: Hybrid
- Impact factor: 0.588 (2020)

Standard abbreviations
- ISO 4: Pozn. Stud. Contemp. Linguist.

Indexing
- ISSN: 0137-2459 (print); 1897-7499 (web)
- LCCN: 2001229287
- OCLC no.: 717158075

Links
- Journal homepage

Poznań Studies in Contemporary Linguistics is a peer-reviewed academic journal of general linguistics that was established in 2011 and is published by De Gruyter. Its editor-in-chief is Katarzyna Dziubalska-Kolaczyk (Adam Mickiewicz University).
