= Mira Ariel =

Linguist

Mira Ariel (Hebrew: מירה אריאל) is a professor of linguistics at Tel Aviv University, specializing in pragmatics. A pioneer of the study of information structure, she is best known for creating and developing Accessibility Theory.

== Education and career ==
After completing a BA in linguistics and English literature at Tel Aviv University in 1976, Ariel studied at the University of Pennsylvania, where she graduated with an MA in 1978. Ariel returned to Tel Aviv University in 1979 to pursue her PhD studies. She was advised by Tanya Reinhart and Ellen Prince and was awarded her PhD in 1986 with a dissertation entitled, Givenness marking. She subsequently spent a brief period as an honorary research fellow in sociolinguistics at the University of London.

Ariel was hired as a lecturer at Tel Aviv University in 1988 and spent her whole career there, reaching the rank of full professor in 2006.

== Honors ==
From 2018 to 2019, she served as President of the Societas Linguistica Europaea.

In 2021 she was elected as a member of the Academia Europaea.

== Research ==
Ariel’s research deals with issues in pragmatics and at the semantics-pragmatics interface and is mainly concerned with linguistic manifestations of reference to entities in discourse. Her body of work on Accessibility Theory makes the case that the language user’s choice of anaphora is governed by the notion of accessibility in memory. Ariel’s accessibility marking scale proceeds from low to high accessibility in the following order:

1. Full name + modifier
2. Full name
3. Long definite description
4. Short definite description
5. Last name
6. First name
7. Distal demonstrative + modifier
8. Proximal demonstrative + modifier
9. Distal demonstrative (+ NP)
10. Proximal demonstrative (+ NP)
11. Stressed pronoun + gesture
12. Stressed pronoun
13. Unstressed pronoun
14. Cliticized pronoun
15. Verbal pronoun inflections
16. Zero

Ariel's Accessibility Theory has been influential in a wide variety of domains beyond pragmatics, including cognitive linguistics, linguistic typology, sociolinguistics, discourse analysis, language acquisition, poetics, psycholinguistics, and natural language processing.

== Selected publications ==
- Ariel, Mira. 1988. Referring and accessibility. Journal of Linguistics 24 (1), 65–87.
- Ariel, Mira. 1990. Accessing noun-phrase antecedents. London: Routledge. ISBN 9781315857473
- Ariel, Mira. 1991. The function of accessibility in a theory of grammar. Journal of Pragmatics 16 (5), 443–463.
- Ariel, Mira. 1994. Interpreting anaphoric expressions: A cognitive versus a pragmatic approach. Journal of Linguistics 30 (1), 3–42.
- Ariel, Mira. 2001. Accessibility theory: an overview. In Ted Sanders, Joost Schilperoord, & Wilbert Spooren (eds.), Text representation: linguistic and psychological aspects, 29-87. Amsterdam: John Benjamins.
- Ariel, Mira. 2008. Pragmatics and grammar. Cambridge: Cambridge University Press. ISBN 9780511791314
- Ariel, Mira. 2010. Defining pragmatics. Cambridge: Cambridge University Press. ISBN 9780511777912
