= Matti Kilpiö =

Finnish philologist (1939–2023)

Matti Kalervo Kilpiö (17 November 1939 – 28 May 2023) was a philologist at the University of Helsinki and a musician. He is noted for his contributions to the study of Old English.

== Career ==
Kilpiö joined the University of Helsinki Department of English (from 2010 the Department of Modern Languages) in 1969. There he completed his PhD thesis, which was supervised by Tauno F. Mustanoja and Matti Rissanen, in 1989, later becoming docent in English Philology.

Alongside Leena Kahlas-Tarkka, Kilpiö edited the Old English texts in the ground-breaking Helsinki Corpus of English Texts, a seminal English-language corpus of historical texts, first published in 1991, of which Matti Rissanen was editor-in-chief. During the same period, Kilpiö composed the Toronto Dictionary of Old English entry for the verb bēon ('to be'), sifting around 100,000 instances of the verb to produce an entry with around thirty pages of citations in its original, microfiche, publication. Following the collapse of the Soviet Union, Kilpiö, Rissanen, Kahlas-Tarkka, Victor I. Shadrin and Ludmila Chakhoyan led a project to promote collaboration between European and Russian scholars. The scheme supported the development of corpus linguistics, focusing on English historical linguistics, in St Petersburg, and facilitated the study of medieval and early modern manuscripts and printed books of English provenance held in St Petersburg. In 1998, Kilpiö led the staging by English Department students of the Chester Mystery Plays in Helsinki; in 2016, he taught a course in Old English poetry that later became the basis for a volume of Old English verse translated into Finnish by the course's various students.

In 1997, Kilpiö was elected vice-president of what was then the International Society of Anglo-Saxonists, and elected president in 1999. He completed his term at the close of 2001. He was elected honorary member of the society in 2003. From this period onwards, Kilpiö worked on the Dictionary of Old English entry for another Old English verb with key grammatical functions, habban ('to have'), which was published in 2008. He also reviewed research on Old English syntax for The Year's Work in Old English Studies.

In 2010, he was the recipient of a Festschrift, and the 'Valoisa keskiakia' ('Luminous Middle Ages') prize, awarded by Finland's medieval studies society Glossa.

At the time of his death, Kilpiö was collaborating with Kahlas-Tarkka on an edition of the diaries of Ann Bathurst, a seventeenth-century mystic.

== Music ==
Before commencing his degree in English, Kilpiö had hoped to study music at the Sibelius Academy. Throughout his life, he was an active amateur musician, playing the viola and singing in choirs. His musical and philological interests intersected in his work as a translator of songs between English, Latin, and Finnish, and in his collaboration with the Sibelius Academy to provide period music to the performance of the Chester Mystery Plays he staged in 1998.

== Works ==
=== Academic ===
Alongside a large number of articles, Kilpiö's principal publications were:

- Passive constructions in Old English translations from Latin, with special reference to the OE Bede and the Pastoral care, Mémoires de la Société néo-philologique à Helsingfors, 49 (Helsinki: Société néophilologique, 1989), ISBN 9519603042
- Matti Kilpiö, with attested spelling materials assembled by Robert Millar, using the materials assembled by Haruko Momma, 'Beon (Supplement to Fascicle B)', in Dictionary of Old English (Toronto: Pontifical Institute of Mediaeval Studies, 1992), ISBN 0-88844-923-2
- Anglo-Saxons and the north: essays reflecting the theme of the 10th Meeting of the International Society of Anglo-Saxonists in Helsinki, August 2001, ed. by Matti Kilpiö and others, Essays in Anglo-Saxon studies, 1/Medieval & Renaissance Texts & Studies, 364 (Tempe, Ariz.: Arizona Center for Medieval and Renaissance Studies, 2009), ISBN 9780866984126
- Ex insula lex: manuscripts and hagiographical material connected with medieval England, ed. by Matti Kilpiö and Leena Kahlas-Tarkka (Helsinki: Helsinki University Library, The National Library of Finland, 2001), ISBN 9521000120
- Western European Manuscripts and Early Printed Books in Russia: Delving into the Collections of the Libraries of St Petersburg, ed. by Leena Kahlas-Tarkka & Matti Kilpiö, Studies in Variation, Contacts and Change in English, 9 (Helsinki: Varieng, 2012)

=== Music ===
Kilpiö's principal musical publications are listed in the Finnish national database of authors and composers.
