= William Freeman Twaddell =

American linguist (1906–1982)

- Born: March 22, 1906; Rye, New York
- Died: March 1, 1982 (aged 75)

Academic background
- Education: Duke University, Harvard University

Academic work
- Discipline: Linguist
- Institutions: Brown University, Linguistic Society of America, University of Wisconsin
- Notable works: The English Verb Auxiliaries

William Freeman Twaddell (1906–1982) was an American linguist and professor of German, who worked at Brown University as a linguist during the 1950s and 1960s. He also served as president of the Linguistic Society of America in 1957.

== Biography ==
Twaddell was born in Rye, New York, on March 22, 1906. He spent his early life in Maryland, Pennsylvania, Georgia, and North Carolina. He attended graduate studies at Harvard, and met John Albrecht Walz, then a fellow graduate student, who introduced him to the field of linguistics. In 1926 he graduated from Duke University. From Harvard University he earned his master's degree in 1927 and he received a doctorate in 1930. In 1929, Twaddell published his first linguistic work, "New Light on Phonetic Change." A few years later, in 1935, he published "On Defining the Phoneme," in the collection "Language Monographs," which is described as being a supplement to Language, Journal of the Linguistics Society of America. Between 1929 and 1946 he worked in the University of Wisconsin in Madison. Later, he headed as chairman of the German department of University of Wisconsin.

In 1946, he became professor of Brown University of Germanic languages in 1946. In 1960, he founded and headed a separate Linguistic department. In 1963 he published "The English Verb Auxiliaries."

Twaddell taught for his entire career of thirty years at Brown University. He died on 1 March 1982.
