= Vesna Bugarski =

Vesna Bugarski (2 May 1930 – 22 August 1992) was a Bosnian architect. She was Bosnia and Herzegovina's first ever female architect.

== Biography ==
Bugarski was born in Sarajevo. After embarking on her studies in Belgrade where she was the only woman to study architecture, Bugarski graduated in Sarajevo in 1964 after an architecture department had opened there. Her first employment was with Prosperitet, a planning and design firm in Sarajevo. She then worked in Denmark for several years, specializing in interior design, before returning to Sarajevo where she began weaving tapestries while continuing to design interiors for offices and apartments. In August 1992 during the Bosnian War, while walking home from the market in Sarajevo, she was killed by a grenade fired from the hills. Most of her work in Sarajevo was destroyed during the war.

== See also ==
- Ranko Bugarski (brother)
