= Linguistics Research Center at UT Austin =

University of Texas research center

The Linguistics Research Center (LRC) at the University of Texas is a center for computational linguistics research & development. It was directed by Prof. Winfred Lehmann until his death in 2007, and subsequently by Dr. Jonathan Slocum. Since its founding, virtually all projects at the LRC have involved processing natural language texts with the aid of computers. The principal activities of the Center at present focus on Indo-European languages and comprise historical study, lexicography, and web-based teaching; staff members engage in several independent but often complementary projects in these fields using a variety of software, almost all of it developed in-house.

== History ==
The LRC was founded by Winfred Lehmann in 1961. In the early days, research efforts at the LRC concentrated on machine translation (MT) -- the translation of texts from one human language to another with the aid of computers, very developed nowadays in the field of language industry—funded by the USAF and other sponsors. The LRC concentrated on German English translation, though a copy of the Russian Master Dictionary was deposited at the LRC after the ALPAC report. After a general hiatus ca. 1975-78, new funding led to the development by Jonathan Slocum and others of a new system with the same name (the METAL MT system), but with new sets of tools for linguists and vastly greater success, resulting in the delivery a production prototype then later a full-fledged commercial MT system. MT R&D continued at the LRC, with funding by various sponsors, until well into the 1990s.

From its early years to the present, the LRC has mounted a number of smaller projects resulting in the publication of significant works relating to Indo-European languages and/or their common ancestor, Proto-Indo-European. The hallmark of this work has been the use of computers to transcribe texts and prepare them for publication. A prominent example of the LRC using computers to prepare texts for print publication is the book by Winfred P. Lehmann, A Gothic Etymological Dictionary (Leiden: Brill, 1986). The final print-ready version was produced with the aid of a laser printer (exotic new technology, in those days) using, for the various languages included in the entries, approximately 500 special characters—many of them designed at the Center. This was the first major etymological dictionary for Indo-European languages to be produced with the aid of computers.

Current LRC projects have concentrated on transcribing early Indo-European texts, developing language lessons based on them, and publishing on the web these and other materials related to the study of Indo-European languages, of their common ancestor Proto-Indo-European, and of historical linguistics more generally.

== Alumni ==
- Winfred Lehmann
- Rolf A. Stachowitz
- Jonathan Slocum
- Winfield S. Bennett
- John White
