= Societas Linguistica Europaea =

The Societas Linguistica Europaea (SLE) is a Europe-focused professional society for linguists. It was founded in 1966 to advance linguistics, the scientific study of human language. The SLE has over 1,000 individual members and welcomes linguists of all kinds. Through its website, its annual meetings, and its journals Folia Linguistica and Folia Linguistica Historica, the SLE works to disseminate current research in linguistics and facilitate communication within the discipline.

The first president of the SLE was André Martinet, elected in 1966. Particularly active members in the first decades were Werner Winter (president in 1991) and Jacek Fisiak (president in 1972 and 1982). In the years before 1990, the SLE was an important meeting place for linguists from western Europe and eastern Europe. Meetings and presidents alternated between western Europe and eastern Europe.

== Publications ==
The SLE publishes two journals, Folia Linguistica (on all areas of general linguistics) and Folia Linguistica Historica (specifically on historical linguistics).

== Meetings ==
The SLE organizes an annual four-day conference in the summer, with a program of talks, plenary speakers, symposia, and poster sessions for researchers to share their work. In 2020 and 2021, the Annual Meetings of the SLE took place digitally, due to the COVID-19 restrictions on traveling and gatherings. The 53rd Annual Meeting did not take place as originally planned, from 26 to 29 August 2020 at the University of Bucharest. As a result the 55th Annual Meeting took place from 24 to 27 August 2022 at the University of Bucharest.

Meeting	Place	Start date	End date
39	University of Bremen, Bremen, Germany	30 August 2006	2 September 2006
40	University of Joensuu, Joensuu, Finland	28 August 2007	1 September 2007
41	University of Bologna, Forlì, Italy	17 September 2008	20 September 2008
42	University of Lisbon, Lisbon, Portugal	9 September 2009	12 September 2009
43	Vilniaus Universitetas, Vilnius, Lithuania	2 September 2010	5 September 2010
44	University of La Rioja, Logroño, Spain	8 September 2011	11 September 2011
45	Stockholm University, Stockholm, Sweden	29 August 2012	1 September 2012
46	University of Split, Split, Croatia	18 September 2013	21 September 2013
47	Adam Mickiewicz University, Poznań, Poland	11 September 2014	14 September 2014
48	Leiden University, Leiden, Netherlands	2 September 2015	5 September 2015
49	University of Naples, Naples, Italy	31 August 2016	3 September 2016
50	University of Zurich, Zurich, Switzerland	10 September 2017	13 September 2017
51	University of Tallinn, Tallinn, Estonia	29 August 2018	1 September 2018
52	Leipzig University, Leipzig, Germany	21 August 2019	24 August 2019
53	Digitally	26 August 2020	1 September 2020
54	Digitally	30 August 2021	3 September 2021
55	University of Bucharest, Bucharest, Romania	24 August 2022	27 August 2022
56	National and Kapodistrian University of Athens, Athens, Greece	29 August 2023	1 September 2023
57	University of Helsinki, Helsinki, Finland	21 August 2024	24 August 2024
58	University of Bordeaux, Bordeaux, France	26 August 2025	29 August 2025
59	Osnabrück University, Osnabrück, Germany	26 August 2026	29 August 2026

== Presidents ==
The following persons have been president of the Societeas Linguistica Europaea:

- André Martinet 1966
- Björn Collinder 1967
- Ludwik Zabrocki 1968
- Eugenio Coseriu 1969
- Josef Vachek 1970
- Eugenius M. Uhlenbeck 1971
- Jacek Fisiak 1972
- R. H. Robins 1973
- Eva Sivertsen 1974
- Rudolf Filipović 1975
- Luigi Heilmann 1976
- Nils Erik Enkvist 1977
- Bernard Pottier (fr) 1978
- Otmar Werner 1979
- Wolfgang U. Dressler 1980
- Gaberell Drachmann 1981
- Jacek Fisiak 1982
- Klaus Heger 1983
- Pavle Ivić 1984
- Neville E. Collinge 1985
- Thomas Gamkrelidze 1986
- Paul Valentin 1987
- Mario Alinei 1988
- Helena Kurzová 1989
- Herbert Pilch 1990
- Werner Winter 1991
- Peter Trudgill 1992
- František Daneš 1993
- Paolo Ramat 1994
- Ferenc Kiefer 1995
- Jan Svartvik 1996
- Anna Giacalone Ramat 1997
- Matti Rissanen 1998
- Ranko Bugarski 1999
- Pieter Seuren 2000
- Anna Siewierska 2001
- Anders Ahlqvist 2002
- Theo Vennemann 2003
- Johan van der Auwera 2004
- Christian Lehmann (de) 2005
- Eva Hajičová 2006
- Bernard Comrie 2007
- Pier Marco Bertinetto (it) 2008
- Hubert Cuyckens 2009
- Ruth Wodak 2010
- Olga Fischer 2011
- Ian Roberts 2012
- Katarzyna Dziubalska-Kołaczyk 2013
- Marianne Mithun 2014
- Martin Haspelmath 2015
- Martin Hilpert 2016
- Nikolaus Ritt 2017
- Mira Ariel 2018
- Teresa Fanego 2019
- Johannes Kabatek 2020
- Magdalena Wrembel 2021
- Arie Verhagen 2022
- Eva Schultze-Berndt 2023
- Livio Gaeta 2024
- Maria Koptjevskaja-Tamm 2025
