= Ranko Bugarski =

Serbian linguist, academic and author (1933–2024)

- Ранко Бугарски
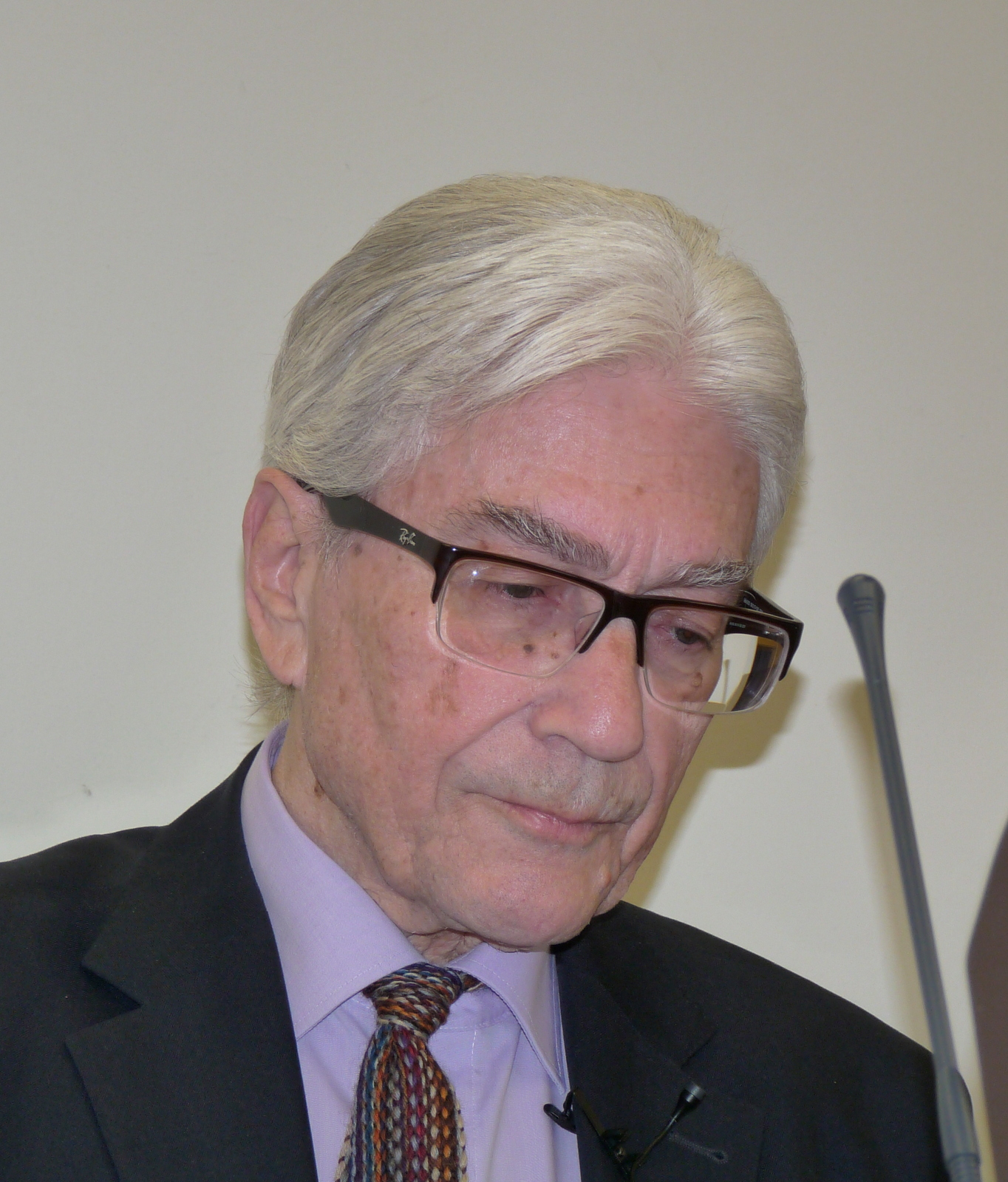
- Bugarski in 2014
- Born: 1 January 1933; Sarajevo, Yugoslavia (now Bosnia and Herzegovina)
- Died: 13 August 2024 (aged 91)
- Relatives: Vesna Bugarski (sister)

Academic background
- Education: University of Sarajevo; University of Belgrade (PhD)

Academic work
- Discipline: Linguist
- Institutions: University of Belgrade

Ranko Bugarski (Serbian Cyrillic: Ранко Бугарски; 1 January 1933 – 13 August 2024) was a Serbian linguist, academic and author.

== Life and career ==
Bugarski was born on 1 January 1933 in Sarajevo, Yugoslavia, where he completed his secondary education and graduated in English and German languages and literatures at the Faculty of Philosophy, University of Sarajevo (1957). After working for three years as a teacher of English at the Institute of Foreign Languages in his hometown, he was appointed by the Department of English, Faculty of Philology, University of Belgrade as a teaching assistant (1961), to progress through the academic hierarchy to the rank of Professor of English (1980). In 1988 he also became Professor of General Linguistics in the same institution, in a new department which he was instrumental in setting up. He retired in 2000 but remained academically active in different ways for many years thereafter.

He did postgraduate research at University College London with Professor Randolph Quirk as his adviser and was a visiting scholar at Columbia University, New York on a Ford Foundation scholarship from 1966 to 1967. After obtaining his Ph.D. degree from the University of Belgrade in 1969 by defending a dissertation on a subsystem of English prepositions, he spent the 1969-70 academic year as a Fulbright lecturer at the University of Chicago and a visiting professor of linguistics at Northeastern Illinois State College, Chicago. In addition to courses or individual lectures at nearly all the universities of the former Yugoslavia, he was a guest lecturer at 24 other universities in Europe, the US and Australia.

Bugarski died on 13 August 2024, at the age of 91.

== Works and reception ==
As a researcher, lecturer and author he has been active in the fields of English and general linguistics, contrastive and applied linguistics, sociolinguistics, language policy and planning, language in relation to identity, culture, ethnicity and nationalism, language attitudes, written language and literacy, terminology and bibliography, translation theory, history of linguistics, the status of Serbo-Croatian, political manipulations of language and wartime hate speech, current Serbian slang, etc. He is the author of some twenty books, ten edited volumes, and scores of articles, book chapters and reviews in international journals, congress proceedings and other collective volumes, mostly in English or Serbo-Croatian but some in German, French, Spanish and several other languages. (For a selective list see below). Among his noted contributions are his early research on English prepositions, acknowledged as a thematic and methodological precursor of cognitive linguistics, his notion of graphic relativity as an extension of the Sapir–Whorf hypothesis of linguistic relativity, his role in defining and organising applied linguistics as an academic discipline in Yugoslavia and internationally, the conception of Serbo-Croatian as one polycentric standard language linguistically but several national languages politically, and his recent pioneering work on lexical blends in Serbian.

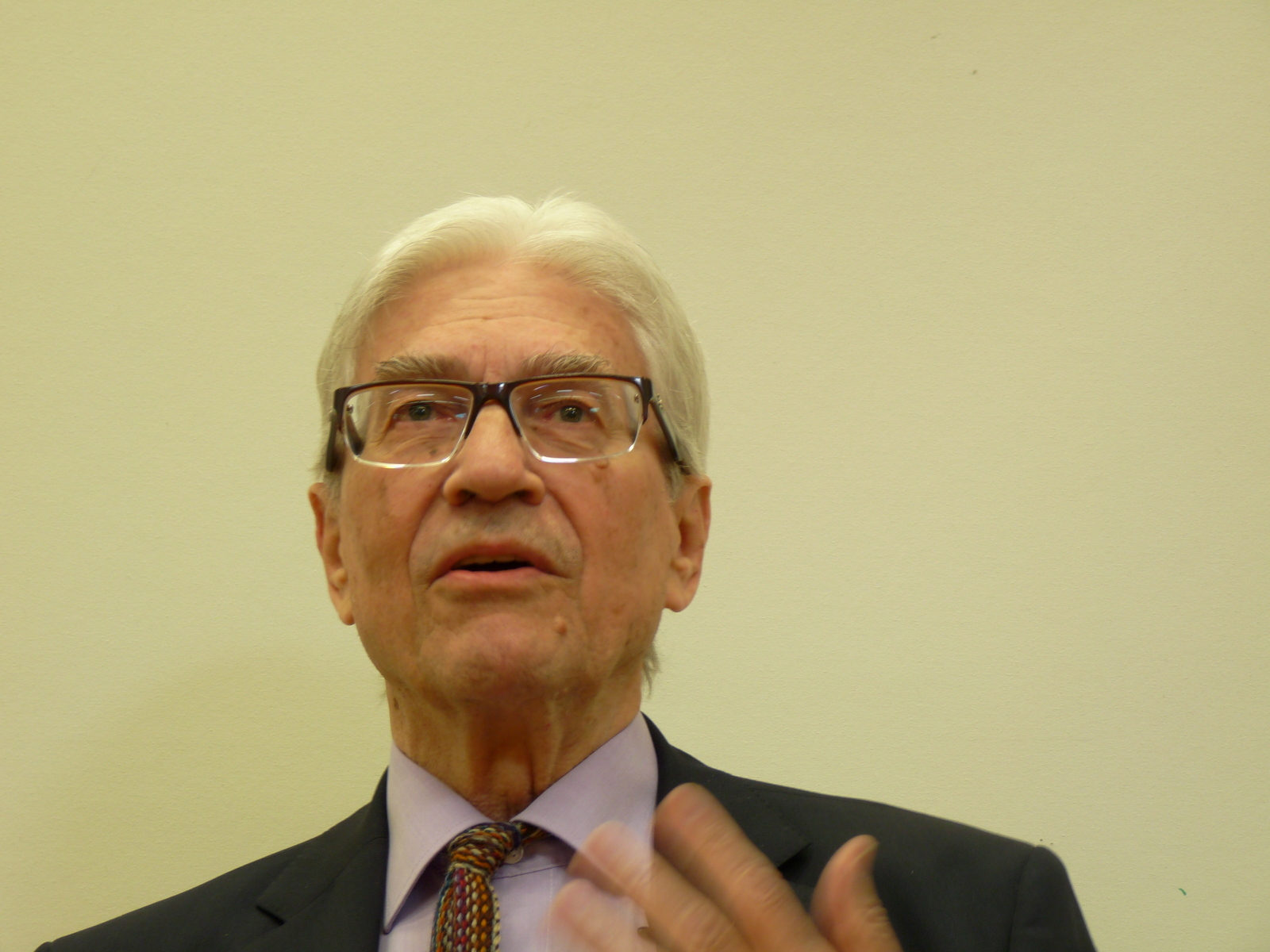
Professor Bugarski at his Ljubljana lecture on language identity 2014.

He has participated in several dozen Yugoslav, European and world congresses, symposia and other conferences, often also as an organiser or invited plenary speaker. He was the academic organiser of two international conferences at the University of London and editor (with Celia Hawkesworth) of their proceedings: Language Planning in Yugoslavia (Columbus, OH: Slavica, 1992. Pp. 233. ISBN 0-89357-232-2) and Language in the Former Yugoslav Lands (Bloomington, IN: Slavica, 2004. Pp. 325. ISBN 0-89357-298-5). He has edited scholarly journals and, as translator and editor, introduced to the Yugoslav public the works of some leading linguists (Chomsky, Sapir, Whorf) and modern linguistic disciplines (transformational-generative grammar, sociolinguistics, psycholinguistics). At the same time, he has kept international audiences informed about the changing language situation in Yugoslavia and its successor states, with a special focus on the official dissolution of Serbo-Croatian. In 2017, he has signed the Declaration on the Common Language of the Croats, Serbs, Bosniaks and Montenegrins.

== Notable positions ==
Co-founder and first president, Yugoslav Association of Applied Linguistics; Vice President, Association Internationale de Linguistique Appliquée (AILA); President, Societas Linguistica Europaea (SLE); corresponding member, Research Centre on Multilingualism (Brussels); national correspondent, Soziolinguistische Bibliographie Europäischer Länder, in the yearbook Sociolinguistica (Tübingen/Berlin); Council of Europe Expert on Regional or Minority Languages (Strasbourg); advisory board member, the journals Multilingua (Berlin/New York) and Historiographia Linguistica, with the associated book series Studies in the History of Linguistics (Amsterdam/Philadelphia); Yugoslav Board member, European Society for the Study of English (ESSE).

== Other honours ==
Member, Academia Scientiarum et Artium Europaea (Salzburg); Honorary President, English-Speaking Union of Serbia; Honorary President, Applied Linguistics Association of Serbia; Honorary member, Association of Serbian Anglicists. He has been honoured with three festschrifts: (1) History and Perspectives of Language Study: Papers in Honor of Ranko Bugarski (eds O.Mišeska Tomić, M.Radovanović), Amsterdam/Philadelphia: John Benjamins, 2000. Pp. 305. ISBN 90-272-3692-5; (2) Jezik, društvo, saznanje - Profesoru Ranku Bugarskom od njegovih studenata [Language, Society, Cognition: For Professor Ranko Bugarski from his Students] (eds D.Klikovac, K.Rasulić), Beograd: Filološki fakultet, 2003. Pp. 300. ISBN 86-80267-67-8; (3) Jezik u upotrebi - primenjena lingvistika u čast Ranku Bugarskom/Language in Use: Applied Linguistics in Honour of Ranko Bugarski (ed. V.Vasić), Novi Sad/Beograd: Društvo za primenjenu lingvistiku Srbije, etc., 2011. Pp. 382. ISBN 978-86-6065-068-1 (bilingual Serbian/Croatian and English volume). His books Jezik i lingvistika (1972) and Jezik u društvu (1986) have won annual prizes, and in 2011 he was awarded the title "Vitez poziva" [Knight of his calling] by the NGO League of Experts-LEX.

== Publications ==
=== Books ===
Most of the first twelve originally published by different publishing houses, thereafter all brought together in the edition of Ranko Bugarski's Selected Works (Belgrade: Čigoja štampa/XX vek, 1996–1997):

- Predlozi over, under, above, below i beneath u savremenom engleskom jeziku [The prepositions over, under, above, below and beneath in contemporary English] (1969, 2nd ed. 1996). Pp. vi+331. ID=47287308. /Ph.D. dissertation, with an English summary/.
- Jezik i lingvistika [Language and linguistics] (1972, 4th ed. 2003). Pp. 301. ID=49205772.
- Lingvistika o čoveku [Linguistics on man] (1975, 3rd ed. 1996). Pp. 218. ID=48322828.
- Jezik u društvu [Language in society] (1986, 3rd ed. 2004). Pp. 261. ID=49207052.
- Lingvistika u primeni [Linguistics in application] (1986, 3rd ed. 2007). Pp. 216. ID=48473612.
- Uvod u opštu lingvistiku [Introduction to general linguistics] (1989, 8th ed. 2013). Pp. 269. ID=48323084.
- Ka jedinstvu lingvistike [Towards unity in linguistics] (1997). Pp. 284. ID=56979468.
- Jezik u kontekstu [Language in context] (1997). Pp. 298. ID=57560588.
- Jezici [Languages] (1993, 6th ed. 2010). Pp. 144. ISBN 978-86-7558-757-6. /Macedonian translation, Skopje, 2001/.
- Pismo [Writing] (1996, 3rd ed. 2010). Pp. 190. ISBN 978-86-7558-641-8. /Macedonian translation, Skopje, 2001/.
- Jezik od mira do rata [Language from peace to war] (1994, 3rd ed. 1997). Pp. 142. ID=52929292. /Greek translation, Athens, 2011/.
- Jezik u društvenoj krizi [Language in a social crisis] (1997). Pp. 168. ID=57789708.

This set was followed by nine further books, all except the last on the list published by Biblioteka XX vek of Belgrade:

- Lica jezika – sociolingvističke teme [Facets of language: Sociolinguistic topics] (2001, 2nd ed. 2002). Pp. 246. ISBN 86-81493-80-9.
- Nova lica jezika – sociolingvističke teme [New facets of language: Sociolinguistic topics] (2002, 2nd ed. 2009). Pp. 262. ISBN 978-86-7562-014-3.
- Žargon – lingvistička studija [Slang: A linguistic study] (2003, 2nd ed. 2006). Pp. 295. ISBN 86-7562-056-X.
- Jezik i kultura [Language and culture] (2005). Pp. 288. ISBN 86-7562-040-3.
- Evropa u jeziku [Europe in language] (2009). Pp. 246. ISBN 978-86-7562-085-3.
- Jezik i identitet [Language and identity] (2010). Pp. 279. ISBN 978-86-7562-093-8.
- Portret jednog jezika [Portrait of a language] (2012). Pp. 278. ISBN 978-86-7562-103-4.
- Sarmagedon u Mesopotamaniji – leksičke skrivalice [Sarmageddon in Mesopotamania: Lexical blends] (2013). Pp. 207. ISBN 978-86-7562-110-2.
- Selektivna sociolingvistička bibliografija: SFRJ/SRJ-SCG/Srbija, 1967–2007 [Selective sociolinguistic bibliography of Yugoslavia/Serbia, 1967–2007] (2009). Beograd: Narodna biblioteka Srbije. Pp. 124. ISBN 978-86-7035-203-2.

=== Selected articles and book chapters ===
- On the interrelatedness of grammar and lexis in the structure of English. Lingua 19:3, 1968, 233–263.
- Symmetry and asymmetry in prepositional systems. Zbornik radova povodom četrdesetogodišnjice osnivanja Katedre za engleski jezik i književnost. Beograd: Filološki fakultet, 1969, 57–69.
- Writing systems and phonological insights. Papers from the Sixth Regional Meeting of the Chicago Linguistic Society. University of Chicago: Department of Linguistics, 1970, 453–458.
- A system of English prepositions and their Serbo-Croatian equivalents. The Yugoslav Serbo-Croatian-English Contrastive Project (ed. R.Filipović), Zagreb: Institute of Linguistics/Washington, DC: Center for Applied Linguistics. Reports 8, 1973, 3–20.
- The object of linguistics in historical perspective. In: History of Linguistic Thought and Contemporary Linguistics (ed. H.Parret), Berlin/New York: Walter de Gruyter, 1976, 1–12.
- The interdisciplinary relevance of folk linguistics. In: Progress in Linguistic Historiography (ed. K.Koerner), Amsterdam/Philadelphia: John Benjamins, 1980, 381–393.
- Some thoughts on the structure and applications of linguistics. In: Models of Grammar, Descriptive Linguistics and Pedagogical Grammar (eds G.Nickel, D.Nehls), Heidelberg: Julius Groos, 1980, 22–45.
- Sociolinguistic issues in standardizing linguistic terminology. Language in Society 12:1, 1983, 65–70.
- Sociolinguistics and language universals. Studia Linguistica 37:1, 1983, 1–8.
- Language universals and linguistic relativity. Acta Linguistica Hafniensia 19:2, 1985, 45–55.
- (with Melanie Mikes) Types and methods in multilingual research in Yugoslavia. In: Methoden der Kontaktlinguistik/Methods in Contact Linguistic Research (ed. P.H.Nelde), Bonn:Dümmler, 1985, 145–154.
- Translation across cultures: Some problems with terminologies. In: Scientific and Humanistic Dimensions of Language. Festschrift for Robert Lado (ed. K.R.Jankowsky), Amsterdam/Philadelphia: John Benjamins, 1985, 159–163.
- Politique et aménagement linguistiques en Yougoslavie. In: Politique et Aménagement Linguistiques (ed. J.Maurais), Québec: Conseil de la Langue Française/Paris: Le Robert, 1987, 417–452.
- Language planning in Yugoslavia. In: Actes du Colloque International sur l'Aménagement Linguistique/Proceedings of the International Colloquium on Language Planning (ed. L.Laforge), Québec: Les Presses de l'Université Laval, 1987, 133–141.
- Applied linguistics as linguistics applied. In: The Relation of Theoretical and Applied Linguistics (eds O. Mišeska Tomić, R.W.Shuy), New York/London: Plenum Press, 1987, 3–19.
- Multilingualism and markedness in language use: The Yugoslav case. Grazer Linguistische Studien 28, 1987, 5–11.
- Soziolinguistische Aspekte der heutigen serbokroatischen Standardsprache. Die Welt der Slaven 34:2, 1989, 259–273.
- Generative structuralism. In: Yugoslav General Linguistics (ed. M.Radovanović), Amsterdam/Philadelphia: John Benjamins, 1989, 33–46.
- The social basis of language conflict and language attitudes. In: Language Attitudes and Language Conflict/Spracheinstellungen und Sprachkonflikte (ed. P.H.Nelde), Bonn:Dümmler, 1990, 41–47.
- Contrastive analysis of terminology and the terminology of contrastive analysis. In: Languages in Contact and Conflict (eds V.Ivir, D.Kalogjera), Berlin/New York: Mouton de Gruyter, 1991, 73–92.
- Graphic relativity and linguistic constructs. In: Literacy and Language Analysis (ed. R.J.Scholes), Hillsdale, NJ: Lawrence Erlbaum, 1993, 5–18.
- Language and languages: A retrospect. In: History of Linguistics 1993 (ed. K.R.Jankowsky), Amsterdam/Philadelphia: John Benjamins, 1995, 321–326.
- A problem of language identity: The comparative linguistics of Serbo-Croatian. In: Dán do Oide: Essays in Memory of Conn R. Ó Cléirigh (eds A.Ahlqvist, V.Čapková), Dublin: The Linguistics Institute of Ireland, 1997, 67–73.
- Language-internal conflict and language dissolution. In: Recent Studies in Contact Linguistics (eds W.Wölck, A. de Houwer), Bonn:Dümmler, 1997, 29–35.
- Lengua, nacionalismo y la désintegración de Yugoslavia. Revista de Antropología Social 6, 1997, 13–27.
- Discourses of war and peace. Folia Linguistica 34:3–4, 2000, 129–145.
- Language, nationalism and war in Yugoslavia. International Journal of the Sociology of Language 151, 2001, 69–87.
- Serbo-Croatian and its descendants: A case of Umbau? In: Lexical Norm and National Language – Lexicography and Language Policy in South-Slavic Languages after 1989 (ed. R.Lučić), München: Otto Sagner, 2002, 145–149.
- Sprachenpolitik in den Nachfolgestaaten des ehemaligen Jugoslawien. In: Sprache und politischer Wandel (eds H.Gruber, F.Menz, O.Panagl), Frankfurt/Main: Peter Lang, 2003, 51–70.
- Serbo-Croatian and English: Some sociolinguistic parallels. In: Germano-Slavistische Beiträge. Festschrift für Peter Rehder zum 65. Geburtstag (eds M.Okuka, U.Schweier), München: Otto Sagner, 2004, 45–52.
- Language and boundaries in the Yugoslav context. In: Language, Discourse and Borders in the Yugoslav Successor States (eds B.Busch, H.Kelly-Holmes), Clevedon: Multilingual Matters, 2004, 21–37.
- One, two, three, four: It's Serbo-Croatian that counts. In: A Companion in Linguistics: A Festschrift for Anders Ahlqvist on the Occasion of his Sixtieth Birthday (eds B.Smelik et al.), Nijmegen: Stichting Uitgeverij de Keltische Draak/Münster: Nodus, 2005, 310–323.
- What English means to us. In: Interkatedarska konferencija anglističkih katedri Niš 2006 (ed. V.Ž.Jovanović), Niš: Filozofski fakultet, 2007, 11–19.
- European language policy between diversity and globalisation. In: Jezična politika i jezična stvarnost/Language policy and language reality (ed. J.Granić), Zagreb: Hrvatsko društvo za primijenjenu lingvistiku, 2009, 629–640.
- Half a century of linguistics: Some reflections and reminiscences. BAS/British and American Studies 14, 2009, 203–212.
- English in European institutions: Some observations. Belgrade English Language & Literature Studies 1, 2009, 109–117.
- Multiple language identities in Southeastern Europe (with a focus on Serbo-Croatian). In: Europe-Evropa: Cross-cultural Dialogues between the West, Russia, and Southeastern Europe (eds M.Könönen, J.Nuorluoto), Uppsala: Studia Multiethnica Upsaliensia 18, 2010, 34–49.
- Who are you? Profiling individual identities. In: English Language and Literature Studies: Image, Identity, Reality (eds N.Tomović, J.Vujić), Belgrade: Faculty of Philology, vol. I, 2011, 11–17.
- Language, identity and borders in the former Serbo-Croatian area. Journal of Multilingual and Multicultural Development 33:3, 2012, 219–235.
- What happened to Serbo-Croatian? In: After Yugoslavia: The Cultural Spaces of a Vanished Land (ed. R.Gorup), Stanford, CA: Stanford University Press, 2013, 160–168.

== See also ==
- List of members of the European Academy of Sciences and Arts
- Serbo-Croatian language
- Societas Linguistica Europaea
