= Robert T. Harms =

American linguist

- Born: Robert Thomas Harms; 1932
- Died: October 5, 2016 (aged 83–84)

Academic background
- Education: University of Chicago

Academic work
- Discipline: Linguist
- Sub-discipline: Phonology
- Institutions: University of Texas at Austin

Robert Thomas Harms (April 12, 1932 – October 5, 2016) was an American linguist and emeritus professor of linguistics at University of Texas at Austin. He is known for his research on grammar of Estonian and phonological theory.

== Books ==
- Introduction to Phonological Theory, 1968
- Estonian Grammar, 1962
- Finnish Structural Sketch, 1964
