= Journal of Germanic Linguistics =

- Discipline: Linguistics, Germanic languages
- Language: English
- Edited by: Tracy Alan Hall

Publication details
- Former name(s): American Journal of Germanic Linguistics and Literatures
- History: 1989–present
- Publisher: Cambridge University Press (United Kingdom)
- Frequency: Quarterly

Standard abbreviations
- ISO 4: J. Ger. Linguist.

Indexing
- ISSN: 1470-5427 (print); 1475-3014 (web)
- LCCN: 2001233114
- OCLC no.: 645360234

Links
- Journal homepage

Journal of Germanic Linguistics is a peer-reviewed academic journal in the field of linguistics. It is devoted particularly to Germanic languages, including both their historical and contemporary forms. It was established in 1989 as the American Journal of Germanic Linguistics and Literatures and was published biannually up to 2001, when it acquired the current title in order to reflect its international scope and, at the same time, the narrowing of its focus to exclusively linguistics. It is currently published quarterly by Cambridge University Press on behalf of the Society for Germanic Linguistics and the Forum for the Society for Germanic Language Studies. Its editor-in-chief is Tracy Alan Hall (Indiana University).

== Abstracting and indexing ==
This journal is indexed in the following databases:

- Social Sciences Citation Index
- Arts & Humanities Citation Index
