= Werner Winter =

German linguist (1923–2010)

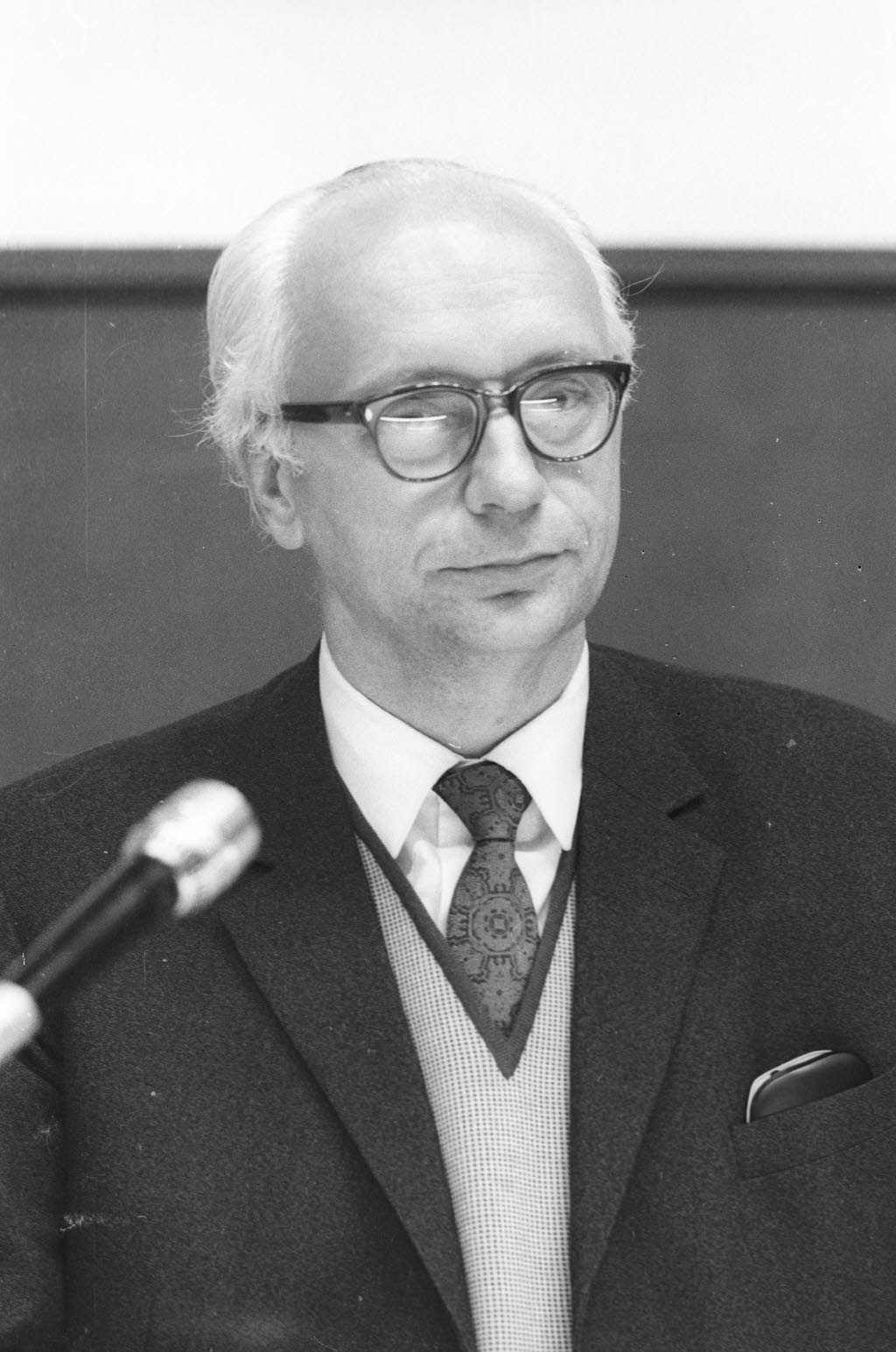
- Winter in 1971
- Born: Johann Karl Werner Winter; 25 October 1923; Haselau, Weimar Republic
- Died: 7 August 2010 (aged 86); Preetz, Germany

Academic background
- Education: University of Kiel
- Doctoral advisor: Ernst Fraenkel

Academic work
- Doctoral students: Olav Hackstein

Johann Karl Werner Winter (25 October 1923 – 7 August 2010) was a German Indo-Europeanist and linguist.

== Life ==
Winter was born in Haselau. His brother was killed during the Second World War. He studied under Ernst Fraenkel at the University of Kiel, where he later succeeded Fraenkel. Although he wrote hardly any individual volumes of his own, he established himself in the study of Tocharian and, as a result of his work as the editor of many series and work in general linguistics, he had far-reaching influence. Winter spent his life in his native Holstein. His students included Olav Hackstein, Peter Kuhlmann, and Christian T. Petersen. He is known for formulating Winter's law. He was appointed president of Societas Linguistica Europaea in 1991. He died in Preetz.

== Distinctions ==
- Honorary doctorate from the University of Poznań (1984)
- Honorary doctorate from the University of Kaliningrad (2000)

== Works ==
The following is a random selection of publications:

- A Bantawa Dictionary (Berlin, 2003)
- "Vom Genitiv im heutigen Deutsch" (The Genitive in Modern German; in: Zeitschrift für deutsche Sprache 22, pp. 21–35)
- Studia Tocharica. Selected Writings/Ausgewählte Beiträge (Poznań 1984).
