= Joe Salmons =

American linguist (born 1956)

- Born: 1956 (age 69–70); North Carolina, U.S.

Academic background
- Education: University of Texas at Austin
- Doctoral advisor: Edgar C. Polomé

Academic work
- Discipline: Linguistics
- Institutions: Purdue University; University of Wisconsin–Madison
- Notable works: A History of German (2018)

Joseph Curtis Salmons (born in North Carolina in 1956) is an American linguist who is professor of language sciences at University of Wisconsin–Madison.

== Biography ==
Salmons received his BA in Philosophy from the University of North Carolina at Charlotte 1978, and his PhD in Germanic Linguistics from the University of Texas at Austin in 1984. His dissertation supervisor was Edgar C. Polomé.

He subsequently served as Assistant Professor (1985–1991) and Associate Professor (1991–1995) of German and Linguistics at Purdue University. Since 1993, Salmons has served as Associate Professor (1993–1997) and Professor (1997–2017) of German and Professor of Language Sciences (2017-) at the University of Wisconsin – Madison.

Salmons specializes in Germanic linguistics and works increasingly on Algonquian languages. He primarily researches language change and linguistic theory, particularly sound systems. Salmons is the author numerous monographs, including A History of German (2018), and he is co-editor with Patrick Honeybone of the Oxford Handbook of Historical Phonology (2015).

Salmons is married to linguist Monica Macaulay.

== Honors and awards ==
Salmons edited the journal Diachronica from 2002 to 2020 and is on the editorial board of numerous scholarly journals, and has held leading positions at several scholarly societies.

He co-founded the Center for the Study of Upper Midwestern Cultures with Jim Leary and has served as director for much of its existence.

He was elected a Fellow of the Linguistic Society of America in 2018.

== Selected works ==
- Accentual Change and Language Contact, 1992. ISBN 978-0-415-08872-5
- The Glottalic Theory, 1993. ISBN 978-0-941694-40-7
- A History of German, 2018. ISBN 978-0-19-872302-8
- Sound Change, 2022. ISBN 978-1-4744-6174-0
- Oxford Handbook of Historical Phonology, 2015. [Co-edited with Patrick Honeybone.] ISBN 978-0-19-923281-9
