= Proto-Athabaskan language =

Reconstructed ancestor of the Athabaskan languages

Proto-Athabaskan
- Proto-Athapaskan
- Reconstruction of: Athabaskan languages
- Region: North America
- Reconstructed ancestors: Proto-Dené–Yeniseian?: Proto-Na-Dene

Proto-Athabaskan is the reconstructed ancestor of the Athabaskan languages.

== History ==
The Athabaskan languages have been recognized as a genetic grouping for more than a century. The relationship between Northern Athabaskan languages was first acknowledged in 1836 by Albert Gallatin, who named them after Lake Athabasca. They were later connected to the Oregon Athabaskan languages and the Apachean languages. Edward Sapir was the first to speculate about the nature of the proto-language in 1914 and published a reconstruction of Proto-Athabaskan phonology in 1915, although further reconstruction would not be published until 1956 by Harry Hoijer. In 1964, Michael E. Krauss published a new phonological reconstruction that constituted a significant reworking of Sapir's reconstruction. Eung-Do Cook and Keren Rice have also worked on the phonology as well as syntax, while Gillian Story and Jeff Leer have reconstructed grammatical items. Krauss and Leer together published a book-long paper reviewing the sonorants in 1981. Leer reconstructed the classifier in 1990, and he collected a comparative lexicon including reconstructed terms in 1996. The 2005 book Athabaskan prosody offered a survey of the issue of tone and prosody in Proto-Athabaskan and its daughter languages, and has reconstructed lexical items.

=== Tonology ===
The Athabaskan languages are well-known among North American Indigenous languages for having many tonal members; however, several languages, including all of the Pacific Coast Athabaskan languages, lack tone. The correspondences between Athabaskan tone systems and their implications for Proto-Athabaskan have been the subject of linguistic inquiry for over a century.

The early work on Athabaskan languages ignored phonemic tone in grammatical and lexical works, although it was mentioned by linguists such as Émile Petitot and Adrien Gabriel Morice. Edward Sapir's first fieldwork on Athabaskan languages was with Chasta Costa and Kato, both Pacific Coast Athabaskan languages that lack tone. He documented tone in Tlingit, a Na-Dene language, in 1914 when working with Louis Shotridge. He then encountered tone in Tsuutʼina (Sarcee) and Gwichʼin, both low-marked languages, and thus concluded that Proto-Athabaskan must be reconstructed as a tonal language with two tones: marked low tone and unmarked (high) tone. However, Li Fang-Kuei came across apparently contradictory findings in Chipewyan. He discovered that Chipewyan's high tone corresponded to Sapir's reconstructed Proto-Athabaskan low tone. This pattern, called "tonal flip-flop," in which different languages had seemingly opposite tones for lexical items that were clearly cognate, is documented across the Athabaskan family.

Li attributed the pattern in Chipewyan to a "glottal stop which has been lost". In 1964, Michael E. Krauss published a paper advancing this hypothesis in which he argued that Proto-Athabaskan, instead of tone, had glottalization contrasts which developed independently into tones in the daughter languages or in some cases were lost. He additionally pointed to the Eyak language, which is related to Athabaskan and has glottalization contrasts but no tone, as support for his theory. This theory has been elaborated further by Krauss, Jeff Leer, and John Kingston, and has served as a model for further synchronic studies of tone in Athabaskan languages by authors such as Keren Rice, Gary Holton, and Siri Tuttle. Furthermore, Krauss indicated in 1979 that Jeff Leer's discovery of the toneless Tongass dialect of Tlingit, a Na-Dene language, "strongly suggests that earlier Tlingit was also toneless" like Eyak and Proto-Athabaskan.

== Origins ==
There have been varying proposals as to when Proto-Athabaskan was spoken, when it diverged from Eyak, and when it diverged into its daughter languages. Most proposed datings are low compared to other proto-languages due to the relatively little internal diversity within Athabaskan. Morris Swadesh, Alfred Kroeber, Harry Hoijer, and Dell Hymes used glottochronology to estimate dates of divergence within Athabaskan, presenting dates ranging from between 1300 and 1800 years before the present. Krauss has proposed that Proto-Athabaskan was spoken between 2000 and 2500 years ago, while he posits that Proto-Athabaskan and Proto-Eyak diverged around 3400 years ago. However, James Kari has countered these estimations, saying that the homogeneity within Athabaskan can be explained by typological linguistic factors as well as common territorial practices. He has thus argued that Eyak separated from Athabaskan no earlier than 8000 years ago, while Proto-Athabaskan continued to be spoken until about 3000 years ago. Archaeologically, Proto-Athabaskan–Eyak speakers have been linked with the Northwest Microblade tradition of 4000 B.C. that occupied large areas of Alaska and northwestern Canada, although Krauss and Victor Golla have called this association "highly speculative".

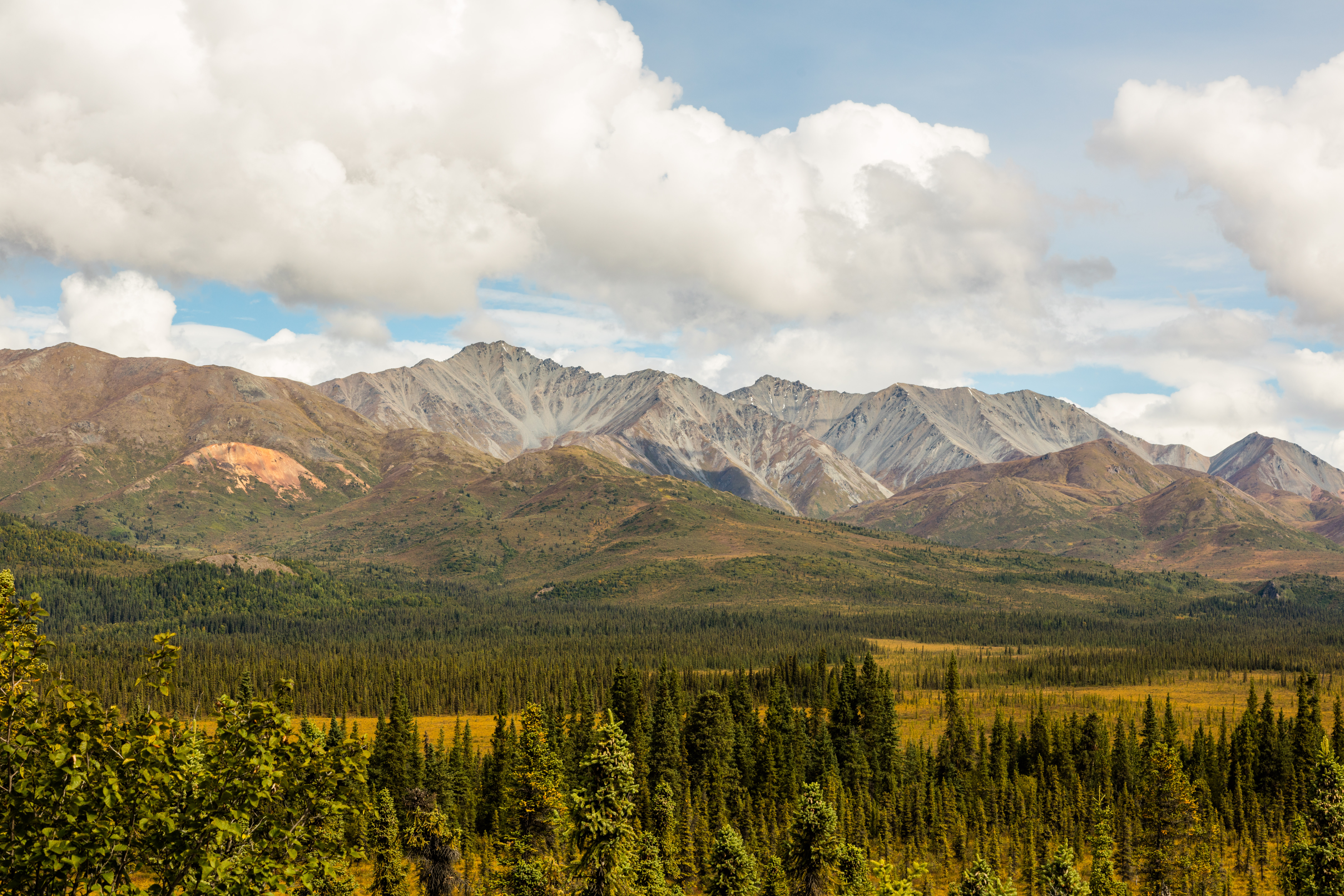
The eastern interior of Alaska has been proposed as a potential Urheimat for Proto-Athabaskan.

Proto-Athabaskan was likely spoken in the interior of what is now eastern Alaska, the Yukon, and parts of British Columbia. This is indicated by the greater degree of linguistic differentiation among the Athabaskan languages now spoken in these same areas. There is little apparent Eskaleut influence on Athabaskan languages except for in Deg Xinag and Dena'ina, which are adjacent to Yup'ik territory, suggesting a non-western origin for the language family. Furthermore, of the Northern Athabaskan languages, only Dena'ina included coastal territory, which also indicates an interior origin. However, this proposal, which is often attributed to Michael Krauss and Victor Golla, has seldom been critically examined. Joseph A. P. Wilson has argued that the Urheimat of Proto-Athabaskan was instead in southwestern Alaska because some reconstructed Proto-Athabaskan lexemes refer to technology developed west of the traditionally proposed region. A southwestern homeland is also more compatible with the Dene-Yeniseian hypothesis. The relative lack of Eskaleut influence on Athabaskan may be due to a rapid expansion of the latter family.

Proto-Athabaskan likely first expanded westward in Alaska and southward into the Interior Mountains of British Columbia. The Pacific Coast Athabaskan languages were likely a result of an early migration southward from British Columbia, while eastern Northern Athabaskan languages arrived at a later date to the Mackenzie River basin. Finally, the date at which the Southern Athabaskan languages arrived in the American Southwest has been debated upon. The earliest known date of Athabaskan habitation in the region is 1300 A.D., although earlier theories suggested an arrival just before the Coronado Expedition in the 16th century. Most hypotheses have argued for a route taken through the Great Plains, but more recent studies have suggested a route that went at least partially through the Rocky Mountains. By the time of European contact, the descendants of Proto-Athabaskan occupied a total area of approximately 1,500,000 square miles (3,900,000 km^{2}), the most of any Indigenous language family in North America.

== Phonology ==
=== Notation ===
Athabaskanists tend to use an Americanist phonetic notation system rather than IPA. Although some Athabaskanists prefer IPA symbols today, the Americanist symbols are still in common use for descriptions of Proto-Athabaskan and in comparisons between members of the family. In the tables in this section, the proto-phonemes are given in their conventional Athabaskanist forms with IPA equivalents following in square brackets.

The symbols conventionally used to represent voiced stops and affricates (e.g. ⟨d dz⟩) are actually used in the Athabaskan literature to represent unaspirated stops and affricates (i.e., /t ts/). This convention is also found in Athabaskan orthographies since true voiced stops and affricates are rare in the family, and unknown in the proto-language.

Since Americanist phonetic notation is not formally standardized, there are sometimes both historic and modern symbols for the same sounds. In the following tables, the older symbols are given first with newer symbols following. Republication of older materials may preserve older symbols for accuracy, e.g. Krauss 2005, which was previously an unpublished manuscript dating from 1979.

=== Consonants ===
The traditional reconstruction of the Proto-Athabaskan sound system consists of 45 consonants, as detailed in the following table.

Obstruents
		Bilabial	Alveolar		Postalveolar		Velar	Uvular		Glottal
		Bilabial	median	lateral	plain	labial	Velar	plain	labial	Glottal
Stop	unaspirated		*d [t]				*g [k]	*ɢ [q]	*ɢʷ [qʷ]	
Stop	aspirated		*t [tʰ]				*k [kʰ]	*q [qʰ]	*qʷ [qʷʰ]	
Stop	glottalized		*tʼ [tʼ]				*kʼ [kʼ]	*qʼ [qʼ]	*qʼʷ [qʷʼ]	*ʼ ~ *ˀ ~ *ʔ [ʔ]
Affricate	unaspirated		*ʒ ~ *dz [ts]	*λ ~ *dl [tɬ]	*ǯ ~ *dž [tʃ]	*ǯʷ ~ *džʷ [tʃʷ]				
Affricate	aspirated		*c ~ *ts [tsʰ]	*ƛ ~ *tł ~ *tɬ [tɬʰ]	*č ~ *tš [tʃʰ]	*čʷ ~ *tšʷ [tʃʷʰ]				
Affricate	glottalized		*cʼ ~ *tsʼ [tsʼ]	*ƛʼ ~ *tłʼ ~ *tɬʼ [tɬʼ]	*čʼ ~ *tšʼ [tʃʼ]	*čʼʷ ~ *tšʼʷ [tʃʷʼ]				
Fricative	voiceless		*s [s]	*ł ~ *ɬ [ɬ]	*š [ʃ]	*šʷ [ʃʷ]	*x [x]	*x̣ ~ *χ [χ]	*x̣ʷ ~ *χʷ [χʷ]	*h [h]
Fricative	voiced		*z [z]	*l [ɮ]~[l]	*ž [ʒ]	*žʷ [ʒʷ]	*γ ~ *ɣ [ɣ]	*γ̇ ~ *ɣ̇ [ʁ]	*γ̇ʷ ~ *ɣ̇ʷ [ʁʷ]	
Sonorants
Nasal		*m [m]	*n [n]		*ŋ̪ ~ *ỹ ~ *ŋʸ ~ *nʸ [ɲ]					
Approximant					*y [j]				*ŋʷ ~ *w̃ ~ *w [w]~[w̃]	

==== First person singular fricative ====
The fricative sound in the first person singular pronoun in Proto-Athabaskan has uncertain phonetic reconstruction, and is represented variously as *$ or *šʸ. In Athabaskan languages, it usually has a reflex of /ʃ/, but in Eyak it appears as /x/ and in Tlingit as /χ/. However, in Kwalhioqua-Tlatskanai, it seems to have been /x/ in at least some forms of the first person subject verb prefix. It does not correspond well with other fricatives, a situation that led Krauss to consider it as unique. This proto-phoneme is not given in the table above, but is assumed to be a part of the Proto-Athabaskan inventory.

==== New consonant reconstruction ====
A newer reconstruction by Leer constitutes a reorganization of the system. Velars are reinterpreted as palatals, labialized postalveolar affricates are reinterpreted as retroflex consonants, and other labialized consonants are removed. Leer also adopted the argument by Keren Rice that there was no need to distinguish between *y and *žʸ. The resulting system is somewhat simpler than the traditional one, with 8 fewer phonemes.

Obstruents
		Bilabial	Apical	Lateral	Laminal	Postalveolar	Retroflex	Palatal	Uvular	Glottal
Stop/Affricate	unaspirated		*d [t]	*dl [tɬ]	*dz [ts]	*ǯ ~ *dž [tʃ]	*ǯʳ ~ *džʳ [ʈʂ]	*gʸ [c]	*ɢ [q]	
Stop/Affricate	aspirated		*t [tʰ]	*tɬ [tɬʰ]	*ts [tsʰ]	*č ~ *tš [tʃʰ]	*čʳ ~ *tšʳ [ʈʂʰ]	*kʸ [cʰ]	*q [qʰ]	
Stop/Affricate	glottalized		*tʼ [tʼ]	*tɬʼ [tɬʼ]	*tsʼ [tsʼ]	*čʼ ~ *tšʼ [tʃʼ]	*čʼʳ ~ *tšʼʳ [ʈʂʼ]	*kʼʸ [cʼ]	*qʼ [qʼ]	*ʼ ~ *ʔ [ʔ]
Fricative	voiceless			*ɬ [ɬ]	*s [s]	*š [ʃ]		*xʸ [ç]	*x̣ ~ *χ [χ]	*h [h]
Fricative	voiced			*l [l]	*z [z]	*ž [ʒ]		(*y [j])	*ɣ̇ ~ *ɣ [ʁ]	
Sonorants
Nasal		*m [m]	*n [n]					*nʸ ~ *ñ [ɲ]		
Approximant		*w [w]				*y [j]				

Leer has argued for an asymmetric lack of retroflex fricatives in the Proto-Athabaskan, saying that "PA lacked distinctively reflexed *šʳ and *žʳ as opposed to plain *š and *ž". Although Leer did not include *ʔ and *h in his list of reconstructed consonants, those two proto-phonemes nevertheless appear in a variety of reconstructions in the same article.

=== Vowels ===
Leer also offered a vowel system consisting of four long or full vowels and three short or reduced vowels which are more centralized.

	Front		Back	
	Full	Reduced	Reduced	Full
High	*iˑ [iː]			*uˑ [uː]
Mid		*ə [ə]	*υ ~ *ʊ [ʊ]	
Low	*eˑ [eː]		*α [ɑ]	*aˑ [ɑː]

The following table is adapted from Leer 2005 and shows the vowel correspondences between Proto-Athabaskan and the better documented Athabaskan languages.

Language	Full vowels				Reduced vowels			
Proto-Athabaskan	*i(ˑ)	*e(ˑ)	*a(ˑ)	*u(ˑ)	*ə_{prefix}	*ə_{stem}	*α	*ʊ
Denaʼina	i	a	u	i	ə ~ ∅	ə	ə	ə
Deg Hitʼan	e	a	o	e	ə	ə	ə	ʊ
Koyukon	i	a	o	u	ə ~ [∅]	ə	α ~ ʊ	ʊ ~ α
Upper Kuskokwim	i	a	o	u	ə ~ [∅]	ə	ʊ	ʊ
Lower Tanana	i	a	o	u	ə ~ [∅]	ə	ʊ	ʊ
Ahtna	i(ˑ)	e(ˑ)	a(ˑ)	u(ˑ)	e ~ ∅	e	a	o
Tanacross	i(ˑ)	e(ˑ)	a(ˑ)	u(ˑ)	e ~ ∅	e	a	o
Upper Tanana	i(ˑ)	e(ˑ)	a(ˑ)	u(ˑ)	i ~ ∅	ɵ ~ a	a	o
Hän	i	e	æ	u	ə ~ ∅	ɵ ~ ə	a	o
Gwichʼin	i_{[pal]}	i_{[pal]}	e ~ i	i(o)_{[pal]}	ə	a	a	o
Northern Tutchone	i	i	e	u	e	ʌ	ʌ	o ~ ʌ
Southern Tutchone	i	e	a	u	e	ʌ	ʌ	o ~ ʌ
Tagish-Tahltan	i(ˑ)	e(ˑ)	a(ˑ)	u(ˑ)	e	e ~ i	a	o
Tsekʼehne/Sekani	i	e	a	u	ə ~ ɪ	ə ~ i	a	o ~ ʊ
Witsuwitʼen	i ~ e	i ~ e ~ ɛ	a ~ e	u ~ o	ə ~ ∅	ə	ə	o ~ ə_{[rnd]}
Dakelh/Carrier	i	e ~ i	a	u ~ o	ə (~ ∅)	ə	ə	ə_{[rnd]}
Slave	i	e	a	u	ɛ	ɛ	a	o
Dëne Sųłiné/Chipewyan (Li)	i	e ~ ə ~ ɛ	a	u	ɛ ~ ə	ɛ ~ ə	a	o
Tsuutʼina	i	a	o	u	i	i	o	u
Navajo	i(ˑ)	e(ˑ)	a(ˑ)	o(ˑ)	i ~ a	i ~ a	a	o
Apache (Hoijer)	i(ˑ)	e(ˑ)	a(ˑ)	o(ˑ)	i	i ~ a	a	o
Hupa (morph.)	e	e	a	o	ə	ə	α	ʊ
Hupa (phonemic)	e(ˑ)	e(ˑ)	a(ˑ)	o(ˑ)	i	i	a	o
Mattole (Li)	i(ˑ)	e(ˑ)	a(ˑ)	o(ˑ)	i	i	a ~ i	o
Galice (Hoijer)	i(ˑ)	e(ˑ)	a(ˑ)	o(ˑ)	a	a	a	a_{[rnd]}
Tututni (Golla)	i	e	a	u	ə	ə	ə	ə_{[rnd]}

=== Tone ===
Athabaskan languages often share clear cognates that nonetheless appear to have opposite tones, as demonstrated below; the first three languages shown have low tone where the next three have high tone in the word for "head," while the opposite is true with the word for "fish." The last three languages lack tone entirely.

	Gwich'in	Tsuut'ina	Navajo	Slavey	Kaska	Hare	Mattole	Galice	Dena'ina	PA
"head"	–kìʔ	–tsìʔ	–tsìːʔ	–tᶿíʔ	–tsíʔ	–f(ʷ)íʔ	–tsiʔ	–siʔ	–tsi	*–tsiʔ
"fish"	ɬúg	ɬúkʼά	ɬóˑʔ ~ -lóˑʔ	ɬùè ~ -lùéʔ	ɬùgə̀	lùgè ~ -lúgéʔ	ɬoˑkʼe	ɬoˑkʼe	ɬiqʼa	*ɬuˑqʼə ~ *ɬuˑqʼeˑ

Research has concluded that Proto-Athabaskan had a system of glottal modifications on the vowel instead of tone, much like those that existed in Eyak and in the Tongass dialect of Tlingit. The oppositions in tonal distribution are explained as an ahistorical division in Athabaskan languages whereby most languages became either "high-marked" or "low-marked" for tone. Thus, a syllable's tone in an Athabaskan language depends on the type of markedness it demonstrates and the Proto-Athabaskan reconstruction of the morpheme.

Many Athabaskan languages show properties of both marked states. However, in general, high-marked languages have high tone where low-marked languages have low tone, and vice versa. The terminology also has synchronic basis, as high-marked languages often only specify a high tone in their phonology while low-marked languages only specify a low tone.

The following table shows how the syllable codas of Proto-Athabaskan (PA) and the internal reconstruction of Pre-Proto-Athabaskan (PPA) correspond with those of the high-marked and low-marked languages.

PPA	PA	High	Low
*VV	*VV	V̀V̀	V́V́
*VV'	*V'	V́'	V̀'
*vR	*vR	v̀R	v́R
*vR'	*v'R'	v́R'	v̀R'
*VVR	*VVR	V̀VR	V́VR
*VVR'	*VV'R'	V́VR'	V̀VR'
*vT	*vT	v̀T	v́T
*vT'	*v'T'	v́T	v̀T
*VVT-R	*VVT	V̀VT	V́VT
*VVT(-T/S)	*VVS	V̀VS	V́VS
*VVT'-R	*VVT'	V̀VT'	V́VT
*VVT'(-T/S)	*VV'S	V́VS	V̀VS
*VV'T(')-R	*V'T(')	V́VT	V̀VT
*VV'T(')(-T/S)	*VV'S	V́VS	V̀VS

In the above table, the symbol v represents a monomoraic reduced vowel, the VV represents a bimoraic full vowel, and the V a monomoraic full vowel in a syllable nucleus whose second mora is '. The R represents a sonorant, the S a fricative, the T a stop or affricate, and the ' a glottalization of the preceding segment.

Nearly all languages that developed tone have also lost syllable-final ejectivity, retaining only the glottalized sonorants and bare glottal stops in that position. However, syllable-initial ejective stops and affricates are generally retained.

== Morphology ==
Because obvious similarities in morphology are prevalent throughout all of the languages in the Athabaskan family, Proto-Athabaskan has an extensive reconstructed proto-morphology. Like all Athabaskan languages, it is morphologically complex.

=== Verb template ===
The actual verb template of Proto-Athabaskan has not been reconstructed yet, as noted by Edward Vajda. In fact, Krauss notes that one morpheme present across multiple languages, the distributive, cannot be reconstructed for Proto-Athabaskan. Keren Rice, in her book Morpheme order and semantic scope, presented a general template for the order of verb elements, taking into account cross-language diversity and divergence.

disjunct domain						#	conjunct domain																		[	stem
preverb	quantificational elements			incorp-orates	object	#	3 subj.	%	qualifiers			subsituation aspect			situation aspect				viewpoint aspect			1 & 2 subject	classifier	root	[	aspect suffixes
preverb	multiple	iterative	distributive	incorp-orates	object	#	3 subj.	%	d-	n-	gh-	transitional	inchoative	inceptive	achieve-ment n	accomp-lishment s	semel-factive s	activity gh	imperf.	perf.	opt.	1 & 2 subject	classifier	root	[	aspect suffixes

Kibrik and Hoijer also proposed templates which generalized across a number of Athabaskan languages. Hoijer's proposal is missing several elements which were described in detail later, but Kibrik's is not terribly different from Rice's.

bound phrase		disjunct domain						#	conjunct domain										[	stem			
proclitic	oblique pronoun	preverb	various deriv.	reflexive accusative	iterative	distributive	incorporate	#	number	accusative pron.	3 nominative pron.	%	transitivity decrease	qualifier	inceptive	conjugation	mode	1 & 2 nom. pron.	[	transitivity indicator	root	mode/aspect suffix	enclitic

Kibrik only gives the zones rather than individual positions where the distinction matters. In addition, Kibrik did not give the domains and boundaries which have been added here for comparison.

A major distinction between the Kibrik and Rice versions is in the terminology, with Kibrik's "Standard Average Athabaskan" maintaining much of the traditional Athabaskanist terminology – still widely used – but Rice changing in favor of aspectual descriptions found in wider semantic and typological literature. The terminology in comparison:

- Rice "viewpoint aspect" = conventional "mode"
- Rice "situation aspect" = conventional "conjugation"
- Rice "subsituation aspect" ≈ Kibrik's "inceptive"

In 1989, Kari offered a rigorous foundation for the position class system that makes up the verb template in Athabaskan languages. He defined a few terms and resurrected others which have since become standard in Athabaskanist literature.

- Position: a point or slot the verb template which hosts some number of morphemes which never cooccur. Some affixes may occur in multiple positions which are usually adjacent, but most morphemes are found in a single position. Kari gives the Ahtna ɣo- mode prefix and the s- qualifier as examples of multipositional morphemes.
  - Floating position: a position which seems to move around depending on the appearance or lack of other morphemes in the verb. Kari cites the Ahtna third person plural subject pronominal q- as occurring in three different locations "under highly constrained conditions".
- Zone: a group of positions which are adjacent and semantically similar. Some previous descriptions of "position-subposition" are zones with positions within them. The qualifiers are a type of zone, being made of at least two positions. The description by Krauss and Leer of the classifier as a three-morpheme sequence in Proto-Athabaskan technically makes the classifier a zone, but it is monomorphemic and often treated like a single position in the analysis of documented languages. Tlingit has a classifier approaching a zone although it is morphologically a single unit, and Eyak has a true classifier zone with two phonologically separate prefixes.
- Domain: an area of zones and positions which is grouped together as a phonological unit.
  - Stem domain: a domain including the verb root and suffixes, and usually including the classifier.
  - Conjunct domain: a domain spanning from the classifier (may or may not be included) leftward to the object prefixes.
  - Disjunct domain: a domain spanning from the incorporated nouns to the preverbs, and not including any bound phrases that are considered to be word-external.
- Boundary: a morphological division between zones or domains. Each boundary has an associated conventional symbol. Not all researchers describe all the boundaries for every language, and it is not clear that there is total agreement on the existence of all boundaries.
  - Disjunct boundary (#): the boundary between the disjunct and conjunct domains. Found in most Athabaskan descriptions.
  - Qualifier-pronominal boundary (=/%): the boundary between the qualifiers and the outer pronominals (3 subjects, objects, etc.). Kari proposed using = but since that symbol is often used for clitics, many authors have used % instead.
  - Conjugation-qualifier boundary (%): the boundary between the qualifiers and the conjugation prefixes. Not commonly used, especially with the loss of the % symbol to the qualifier-pronominal boundary.
  - Stem boundary ([): the boundary between the inner pronominals (1 and 2 subject) and the classifier.

Kari uses + to indicate morpheme boundaries. This convention has been adopted by some Athabaskanists, but many others use the more common – instead. Another innovation from Kari is the use of angle brackets to mark epenthetic segments, a convention which is not often used even by Kari himself.

=== Classifier ===
The classifier is a verb prefix that occurs in all Athabaskan languages as well as the Tlingit and Eyak languages. It is, as Leer puts it, "the hallmark of Na-Dene languages". The classifier is found in no other language family, although may be present in the Yeniseian family per Vajda. It is an obligatory prefix such that verbs do not exist without the classifier. Its function varies little from language to language, serving as an indicator of voice and valence for the verb.

==== Terminology ====
The name "classifier" implies a classificatory function that is not obvious. Franz Boas first described a classifier for Tlingit, saying "it is fairly clear that the primary function of these elements is a classificatory one", a not inaccurate statement given that it does enter into the classificatory verb system. Previously Edward Sapir had noted it in his seminal essay on the Na-Dene family, calling it a "'third modal element'". He described it as indicating "such notions as transitive, intransitive, and passive" (id.), thus having voice and valency related functions. Once it was realized that the Tlingit and Athabaskan morphemes were functionally similar, Boas's name for the Tlingit form was extended to the Athabaskan family. However, the classifier has only some vestiges of a classificatory function in most Athabaskan languages, so in this family the name is unsuited.

Because of the confusion that occurs from the use of the term "classifier", there have been a number of proposals for replacement terms. Andrej Kibrik has used the term "transitivity indicator" with the gloss abbreviation TI, Keren Rice has used "voice/valence prefix" abbreviated V/V, and for Tlingit, Constance Naish and Gillian Story used "extensor". None of these alternatives has gained acceptance in the Athabaskan community, and Jeff Leer describes this situation:

A better term would be something like "valentizers", since their principal function is to indicate the valence of the verb ... However, since the name classifier is one of the few grammatical labels sanctioned by common use among Athabaskanists, it is probably not worth the trouble to try to change it.

==== Reconstruction ====
Jeff Leer offers an early reconstruction of the Proto-Athabaskan classifier. It has two dimensions that are both phonological and functional. One dimension is the "series", which surfaces as the presence or absence of a lateral fricative (⟨ɬ⟩). The other dimension is the "D-component", surfacing as the presence or absence of an alveolar stop.

	-D	+D
∅	*∅-	*də-
ɬ	*ɬ-	*ɬə- ~ *l(ə)-

In 2008 Leer gave a more complex reconstruction, which takes into account correspondences with the Proto-Na-Dene yi- prefix. This surfaces as an additional "I-component", which was represented in Proto-Athabaskan as the presence or absence of a palatal nasal.

	-D		+D
	-I	+I	+D
∅	*∅-	*nʸə-	*də-
ɬ	*ɬ-	*nʸə-ɬ-	*ɬə- > *lə-

== See also ==
- Dené–Yeniseian languages

== Bibliography ==
- Boas, Franz (1917). "Grammatical notes on the language of the Tlingit Indians". The University Museum Anthropological Publications. 8 (1). Philadelphia: University of Pennsylvania.
- Campbell, Lyle (1997). American Indian Languages: The Historical Linguistics of Native America. Oxford Studies in Anthropological Linguistics. Vol. 4. Oxford University Press. ISBN 978-0-19-509427-5.
- Cook, Eung-Do (1981). "Athabaskan linguistics: Proto-Athapaskan phonology". Annual Review of Anthropology. Vol. 10. pp. 253–273. doi:10.1146/annurev.an.10.100181.001345.
- Cook, Eung-Do (1992). Bright, William (ed.). International encyclopedia of linguistics. Oxford: Oxford University Press. pp. 122–128. ISBN 0-19-505196-3.
- Cook, Eung-Do; Rice, Keren (1989). "Introduction". In Cook, Eung-Do; Rice, Keren (eds.). Athapaskan linguistics: Current perspectives on a language family. Trends in Linguistics, State-of-the-art Reports. Vol. 15. Berlin: Mouton de Gruyter. pp. 1–61. ISBN 0-89925-282-6.
- Golla, Victor (2011). California Indian languages. Berkeley: University of California Press. ISBN 978-0-520-94952-2. OCLC 755008853.
- Hargus, Sharon; Rice, Keren, eds. (2005). Athabaskan Prosody. Amsterdam: John Benjamins.
  - Krauss, Michael E. (2005). "Athabaskan tone". In Hargus, Sharon; Rice, Keren (eds.). Athabaskan Prosody. Amsterdam: John Benjamins. pp. 51–136. – Revision of Krauss 1979b
  - Leer, Jeff (2005). "How stress shapes the stem-suffix complex in Athabaskan". In Hargus, Sharon; Rice, Keren (eds.). Athabaskan Prosody. Amsterdam: John Benjamins. pp. 278–318.
- Hoijer, Harry (1938). "The southern Athapaskan languages". American Anthropologist. 40 (1): 75–87. doi:10.1525/aa.1938.40.1.02a00080.
- Hoijer, Harry (1956). "The Chronology of the Athapaskan languages". International Journal of American Linguistics. 22 (4): 219–232. doi:10.1086/464374.
- Hoijer, Harry (1971). "The position of the Apachean languages in the Athpaskan stock". In Basso, Keith H.; Opler, M. E. (eds.). Apachean culture history and ethnology. Anthropological papers of the University of Arizona. Vol. 21. Tucson: University of Arizona Press.
- Hoijer, Harry, ed. (1963). Studies in the Athapaskan languages. University of California publications in linguistics. Vol. 29. Berkeley: University of California Press. pp. 1–29.
- Hymes, Dell H. (1957). "A note on Athapaskan glottochronology". International Journal of American Linguistics. 23 (4): 291–297. doi:10.1086/464422.
- Kari, James (1989). "Affix Positions and Zones in the Athapaskan Verb Complex: Ahtna and Navajo". International Journal of American Linguistics. 55 (4): 424–454. JSTOR 1265241.
- Kari, James (1996). "A Preliminary View of Hydronymic Districts in Northern Athabaskan Prehistory". Names. 44 (4): 253–271. doi:10.1179/nam.1996.44.4.253.
- Kari, James M.; Fall, James A.; Pete, Shem; Alex, Mike, eds. (2003). Shem Pete's Alaska: the territory of the Upper Cook Inlet Dena'ina (2nd ed.). Fairbanks, AK: University of Alaska Press. ISBN 978-1-889963-56-3.
- Kari, James; Potter, Ben A., eds. (2010). The Dene–Yeniseian Connection. Anthropological Papers of the University of Alaska, New Series. Vol. 5.
  - Kari, James; Potter, Ben A. (2010). "The Dene-Yeniseian Connection: Bridging Asian and North America". In Kari, James; Potter, Ben A. (eds.). The Dene–Yeniseian Connection. Anthropological Papers of the University of Alaska, New Series. Vol. 5. pp. 1–24.
  - Kari, James (2010). "The concept of geolinguistic conservatism in Na-Dene prehistory" (PDF). In Kari, James; Potter, Ben A. (eds.). The Dene–Yeniseian Connection. Anthropological Papers of the University of Alaska, New Series. Vol. 5. pp. 194–222.
  - Leer, Jeff (2010). "The Palatal Series in Athabascan-Eyak-Tlingit, with an Overview of the Basic Sound Correspondences". In Kari, James; Potter, Ben A. (eds.). The Dene–Yeniseian Connection. Anthropological Papers of the University of Alaska, New Series. Vol. 5. pp. 168–193.
  - Vajda, Edward (2010a). "A Siberian Link with Na-Dene Languages". In Kari, James; Potter, Ben A. (eds.). The Dene–Yeniseian Connection. Anthropological Papers of the University of Alaska, New Series. Vol. 5. pp. 33–99.
- Kibrik, Andrej A. (1993), "Transitivity increase in Athabaskan languages", in Comrie, Bernard; Polinsky, Maria (eds.), Causatives and Transitivity, Studies in Language Companion Series, vol. 23, Amsterdam: John Benjamins Publishing Company, pp. 47–68, doi:10.1075/slcs.23.03kib, ISBN 978-90-272-3026-3
- Kibrik, Andrej A. (1995), Inflection versus derivation in the template for Athabaskan verb morphology (PDF), Albuquerque: Workshop on the Morphology-Syntax Interface in Athapaskan Languages
- Kibrik, Andrej A. (1996), "Transitivity decrease in Navajo and Athabaskan: Actor-affecting propositional derivations", in Jelinek, Eloise; et al. (eds.), Athabaskan Language Studies: Essays in Honor of Robert W. Young, Albuquerque: University of New Mexico Press
- Kingston, John (2005). "The phonetics of Athabaskan tonogenesis" (PDF). Amsterdam Studies in the Theory and History of Linguistic Science. Series 4. 269. Archived from the original (PDF) on 1 May 2011.
- Krauss, Michael E. (1964). "The proto-Athapaskan–Eyak and the problem of Na-Dene, I: The phonology". International Journal of American Linguistics. 30 (2): 118–131. doi:10.1086/464766.
- Krauss, Michael E. (1965). "The proto-Athapaskan–Eyak and the problem of Na-Dene, II: The morphology". International Journal of American Linguistics. 31 (1): 18–28. doi:10.1086/464810.
- Krauss, Michael E. (1968). "Noun-classification systems in the Athapaskan, Eyak, Tlingit and Haida verbs". International Journal of American Linguistics. 34 (3): 194–203. doi:10.1086/465014.
- Krauss, Michael E. (1969). On the classification in the Athapascan, Eyak, and the Tlingit verb. Baltimore: Waverly Press by Indiana University. OCLC 5691471.
- Krauss, Michael E. (1973). "Na-Dene". In Sebeok, Thomas A. (ed.). Linguistics in North America. Current trends in linguistics. Vol. 1. The Hague: Mouton. pp. 903–978. – Reprinted as Krauss 1976a
- Krauss, Michael E. (1976a). "Na-Dene". In Sebeok, Thomas A. (ed.). Native languages of the Americas. New York: Plenum. pp. 283–358. – Reprint of Krauss 1973
- Krauss, Michael E. (1976b). "Proto-Athabaskan–Eyak fricatives and the first person singular" (PDF). CA961K1977a.
- Krauss, Michael E. (1979a). "Na-Dene and Eskimo". In Campbell, Lyle; Mithun, Marianne (eds.). The languages of native America: Historical and comparative assessment. Austin: University of Texas Press.
- Krauss, Michael E. (1979b). "Athabaskan tone". CA961K1978. – Published with revisions as Krauss 2005
- Krauss, Michael E. (1980). Alaska Native Languages: Past, Present, Future (PDF). Fairbanks: Alaska Native Language Center. ISBN 0-933769-34-2.
- Krauss, Michael E. (1981). "On the history and use of comparative Athapaskan linguistics". CA961K1981.
- Krauss, Michael E. (1986). "Edward Sapir and Athabaskan linguistics". In Cowan, W.; Foster, M.; Koerner, K. (eds.). New perspectives in language, culture, and personality. Amsterdam: Benjamins. pp. 147–190.
- Krauss, Michael E. (1987). "The name Athabaskan". In Corey, Peter L. (ed.). Faces, Voices & Dreams: A celebration of the centennial of the Sheldon Jackson Museum, Sitka, Alaska, 1888–1988 (PDF). Sitka, AK: Division of Alaska State Museums and the Friends of the Alaska State Museum. pp. 105–108. Archived from the original (PDF) on 2008-07-23.
- Krauss, Michael E.; Golla, Victor (1981). "Northern Athapaskan languages". In Helm, J. (ed.). Handbook of North American Indians. Vol. 6: Subarctic. Washington, DC: Smithsonian Institution. pp. 67–85.
- Krauss, Michael E.; Leer, Jeff (1981). Athabaskan, Eyak, and Tlingit sonorants. Alaska Native Language Center research papers. Vol. 5. Fairbanks, AK: Alaska Native Language Center, University of Alaska. CA962KL1981.
- Leer, Jeff (1979). Proto-Athabaskan verb stem variation I: Phonology. Alaska Native Language Center research papers. Vol. 1. Fairbanks, AK: Alaska Native Language Center. CA965L1979b.
- Leer, Jeff (1982). "Navajo and comparative Athabaskan stem list". CA965L1982.
- Leer, Jeffery A. (1990). "Tlingit: A portmanteau language family?". In Baldi, P. (ed.). Linguistics change and reconstruction methodology. Berlin: Mouton de Gruyter. pp. 73–98. doi:10.1515/9783110886092.73. ISBN 978-3-11-011908-4.
- Leer, Jeff (1996). "Comparative Athabaskan Lexicon". Alaska Native Language Archive. University of Alaska Fairbanks. CA965L1996a.
- Leer, Jeff (1999). "Tonogenesis in Athabaskan" (PDF). In Kaji, Shigeki (ed.). Cross-Linguistic Studies of Tonal Phenomena Tonogenesis, Typology, and Related Topics. Tokyo University of Foreign Studies: Institute for the Study of Languages and Cultures of Asia and Africa. pp. 37–66.
- Leer, Jeff (2008). "Recent advances in AET comparison". CA965L2008b.
- Li, Fang-Kuei (1933), Chipewyan Consonants, Bulletin of the Institute of History and Philology, Academia Sinica Ts'ai Yuan P'ei Anniversary Volume 1, pp. 429–467
- Mithun, Marianne (4 November 1999). The Languages of Native North America. Cambridge University Press. ISBN 0-521-23228-7.
- Naish, Constance M.; Story, Gillian L. (1973). Tlingit verb dictionary. Summer Institute of Linguistics. ISBN 0-933769-25-3.
- Rice, Keren (1997). "A reexamination of Proto-Athabaskan y". Anthropological Linguistics. 39 (3): 423–426.
- Rice, Keren (2000). Morpheme order and semantic scope: Word formation in the Athapaskan verb. Cambridge: Cambridge University Press. ISBN 978-0-521-58354-1.
- Sapir, Edward (1915). "The Na-Dene Languages, a Preliminary Report" (PDF). American Anthropologist. 17 (3): 534–558. doi:10.1525/aa.1915.17.3.02a00080. JSTOR 660504.
- Seymour, Deni (2012). "Gateways for Athabascan Migration to the American Southwest". Plains Anthropologist. 57 (222): 149–161. doi:10.1179/pan.2012.015.
- Vajda, Edward J. (2010b). "Dene-Yeniseian". Oxford Bibliographies Online. Oxford University Press. ISBN 9780199772810. Archived from the original on 2017-10-11.
- Wilson, Joseph A. P. (2023). "Late Holocene Technology Words in Proto-Athabaskan: Implications for Dene-Yeniseian Culture History". Humans. 3 (3): 177–192. doi:10.3390/humans3030015.
