= Dene–Yeniseian languages =

Proposed language family

Dene–Yeniseian
- (plausible)
- Geographic distribution: North America and central Siberia
- Linguistic classification: Proposed language family
- Subdivisions: Na-Dene; Yeniseian

Language codes
- Glottolog: None
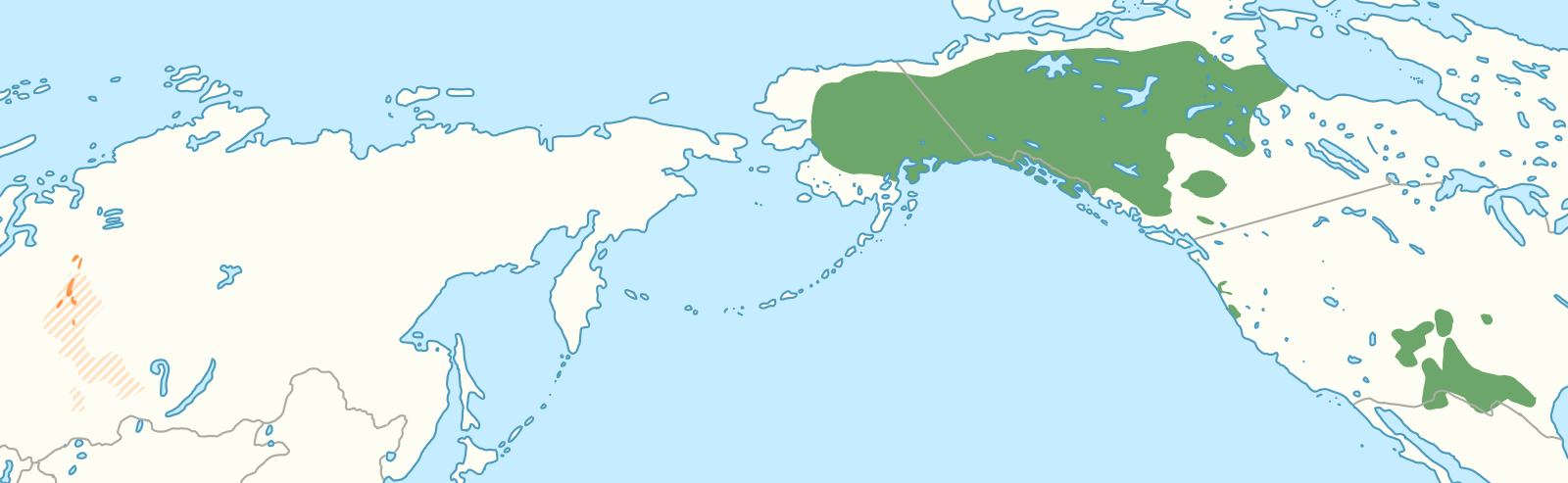
- Distribution of Dene-Yeniseian languages in the 17th century. Solid orange indicates the current extent of the Yeniseian languages. Na-Dene languages Yeniseian languages

Dene–Yeniseian (/dɪˈneɪ ˌjɛnɪˈseɪ.ən/, dih-NAY YEN-ih-SAY-ən) is a proposed language family consisting of the Yeniseian languages of central Siberia and the Na-Dene languages of North America. Some linguistic scholars have deemed Dene–Yeniseian only as "plausible".

== Early work ==
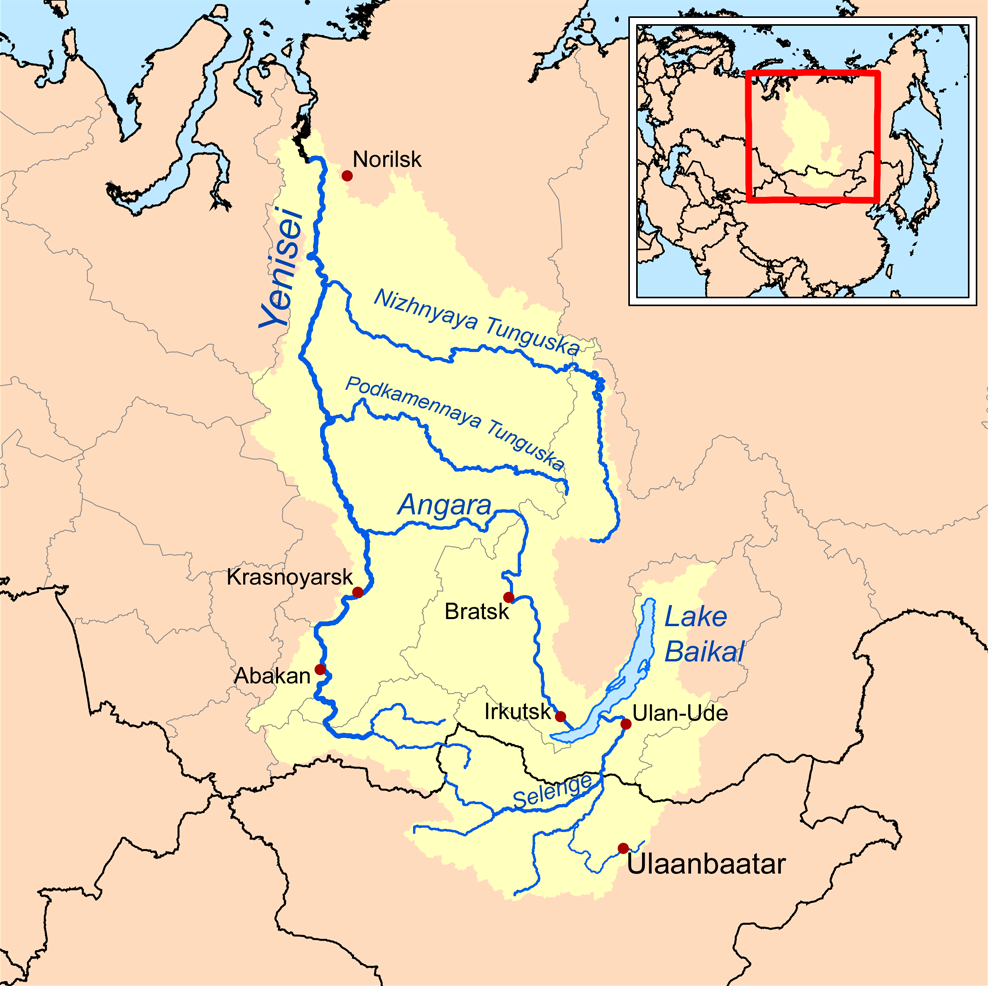
Yenisei River region of central Siberia

Researchers in historical linguistics have long sought to link the various known language families around the world into macrofamilies. The putative relationship between Na–Dene and Yeniseian families was first proposed by Alfredo Trombetti in 1923. Much of the early evidence adduced has been typological; in particular, both families have a complex agglutinative prefixing verb structure, which differs from most of the other languages in Asia and—to a lesser extent—North America.

The first peer-reviewed publication to propose the existence of a distinct Dene–Yeniseian family was written by the macrofamily supporter Merritt Ruhlen (1998) in Proceedings of the National Academy of Sciences, United States. However, Vajda (2010a:34) states, without specifying which ones, that 26 of the 34 sets of words offered by Ruhlen are coincidental look-alikes, whereas 8 of Ruhlen's word sets follow Vajda's rules of sound correspondences.

Michael Fortescue independently suggested the possible existence of a Dene–Yeniseian family in his 1998 book Language Relations Across Bering Strait. He writes, "I have attempted throughout to find a middle way between the cavalier optimism of 'lumpers' and the pessimism of orthodox 'splitters' on the matters of deep genetic relationship between the continents".

As alluded to by Fortescue's comment, scientific investigations of long-range language family relationships have been complicated by an ideological dispute between the so–called "lumpers" and "splitters", with "lumpers" caricatured as bumbling amateurs willing to group together disparate, unrelated families based on chance resemblances and the "splitters" caricatured as rigid enforcers of orthodoxy willing to "shout down" researchers who disagree with their presumption that long-range connections are impossible to establish.

== Vajda's proposal ==
In 2001, Edward Vajda of Western Washington University published a comprehensive reference work on the primary sources on the Dene–Yeniseian languages. At a symposium in Alaska in 2008, Vajda summarized ten years of research, based on verbal morphology and reconstructions of the proto–languages, indicating that the Yeniseian and Na–Dene families might be related. The summation of Vajda's research was published in June 2010 in The Dene–Yeniseian Connection in the Anthropological Papers of the University of Alaska.

This 369-page volume, edited by James Kari and Ben Potter, contains papers from the February 26–29, 2008, symposium plus several contributed papers. Accompanying Vajda's lead paper are primary data on Na–Dene historical phonology by Jeff Leer, along with critiques by several linguistic specialists and articles on a range of topics (archaeology, prehistory, ethnogeography, genetics, kinship, and folklore) by experts in these fields.

The evidence offered by Vajda includes over 110 proposed cognate morphemes and about ten homologous prefix and suffix positions of the verbs. Vajda compared the existing reconstructions of Proto–Yeniseian and Proto–Na–Dene, augmented the reconstructions based on the apparent relationship between the two, and suggested sound changes linking the two into a putative Proto–Dene–Yeniseian language. He suggested that Yeniseian tone differences originated in the presence or absence of glottalized consonants in the syllable coda, as still present in the Na–Dene languages.

Vajda and others also note that no compelling evidence has been found linking Haida with either Na–Dene or Yeniseian. As for the wider Dene–Caucasian hypothesis (see below), while Vajda did not find the kinds of morphological correspondences with these other families that he did with Yeniseian and Na–Dene, he did not rule out the possibility that such evidence exists, and urges that more work be done.

On March 24, 2012, the Alaska Native Language Center hosted the Dene–Yeniseian Workshop at the University of Alaska Fairbanks. There were nine papers, the first new papers on Dene–Yeniseian since the 2010 volume was published. Only one paper was published Sicoli and Holton 2014. However, video from the workshop is available.

Vajda's presentations at the 2012 workshop augmented his proposal with additional linguistic and non-linguistic evidence. He discussed a study he did with Johanna Nichols investigating the history of complex prefixing verb structures in various families possessing morphology of this sort. His conclusion was that, contrary to prevailing belief, such structures are often preserved intact with little change over several thousands of years, and as a result may actually be stronger evidence of a genetic connection than the lexical relationships that are traditionally sought.

As a result, he agreed with the consensus belief that lexical evidence of a genetic relationship becomes virtually undetectable after about 8,000 to 10,000 years of linguistic separation, but suggested that certain sorts of complex morphology may remain stable beyond this time period. Further evidence for Dene–Yeniseian is in Vajda (2013a).

Vajda presents comparanda for an ancient Dene–Yeniseian possessive connector prefix (possibly *ŋ) that appears in idiosyncratic ways in Dene (or Athabaskan), Eyak, Tlingit, and Yeniseian nouns, postpositions, directionals, and demonstratives. Vajda also suggests one new lexical cognate: Proto-Athabaskan directional *ñəs-d "ahead", "out on open water" and Yeniseian root *es "open space". In terms of the sections within Vajda's 2010 paper, this 2013 article can be read as an addition to his §2 (which ends on p. 63). In a subsequent article, Vajda (2013b), Vajda discusses features in Ket that arose due to prolonged areal contact with suffixal agglutinating languages.

In his 2012 presentation, Vajda also addressed non-linguistic evidence, including analyses of Y-chromosome and mitochondrial DNA haplogroups, which are passed unchanged down the male and female lines, respectively, except for mutations. His most compelling DNA evidence is the Q1 Y-chromosomal haplogroup subclade, which he notes arose c. 15,000 years ago and is found in nearly all Native Americans and nearly all of the Yeniseian Ket people (90%), but almost nowhere else in Eurasia except for the Selkup people (65%), who have intermarried with the Ket people for centuries.

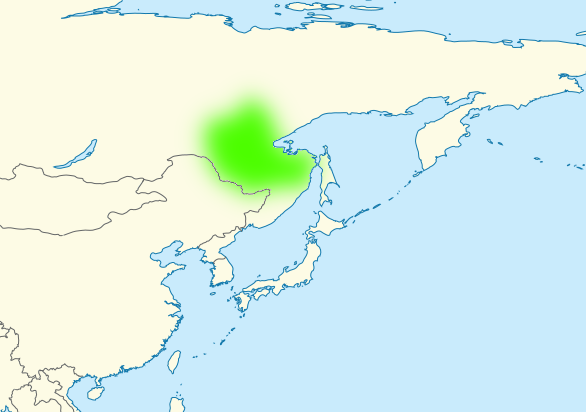
Dene–Yeniseian homeland as proposed by Vajda

Using this and other evidence, he proposes a Proto–Dene–Yeniseian homeland located in eastern Siberia around the Amur and Aldan Rivers. These people would have been hunter-gatherers, as are the modern Yeniseians, but unlike nearly all other Siberian groups (except for some Paleosiberian peoples located around the Pacific Rim of far eastern Siberia, who appear genetically unrelated to the Yeniseians). Eventually all descendants in Eurasia were eliminated by the spread of reindeer-breeding pastoralist peoples (e.g. the speakers of the so–called Altaic languages) except for the modern Yeniseians, who were able to survive in swampy refuges far to the west along the Yenisei River because it is too mosquito–infested for reindeer to survive easily. Contrarily, the caribou (the North American reindeer population) were never domesticated, and thus the modern Na–Dene people were not similarly threatened. In fact, reindeer herding spread throughout Siberia rather recently and there were many other hunter-gatherer peoples in Siberia in modern times.

In his 2012 reply to George Starostin, Vajda clarifies that Dene–Yeniseian "as it currently stands is a hypothesis of language relatedness but not yet a proper hypothesis of language taxonomy". He leaves "open the possibility that either Yeniseian or Na-Dene (or both) might have a closer relative elsewhere in Eurasia".

== Reception ==
At the time of publication, Vajda's proposals had been favorably reviewed by several specialists of Na–Dene and Yeniseian languages—although at times with caution—including Michael Krauss, Jeff Leer, James Kari, and Heinrich Werner, as well as a number of other respected linguists, such as Bernard Comrie, Johanna Nichols, Victor Golla, Michael Fortescue, Eric Hamp, and Bill Poser. Support in regards to cultural anthropology and folklore for Vajda's hypotheses include works by Russian anthropologist Yuri Berezkin and American academic Joseph A. P. Wilson, giving examples of shared folkloric and technological cues for the potential Proto-Dené-Yeniseian speakers.

One significant exception is the critical review of the volume of collected papers by Lyle Campbell and a response by Vajda published in late 2011 that imply that the proposal is not settled at the present time. Other reviews and notices of the volume appeared in 2011 and 2012 by Keren Rice, Jared Diamond, and Michael Dunn. Sicoli and Holton 2014, applying Bayesian analysis to typological data from Dene and Yeniseian languages, constructed phylogenies that suggest that the Dene–Yeniseian connection "more likely represents a radiation out of Beringia with a back migration into Central Asia than a migration from Central Asia or Western Asia to North America".

In 2012, Georgiy Starostin questioned the validity of the macrofamily, citing the fact that "Vajda's 'regular correspondences' are not... properly 'regular' in the classic comparative-historical sense of the word". He also notes that Vajda's "treatment of the verbal morphology" involves "a tiny handful of intriguing isomorphisms... surrounded by an impenetrable sea of assumptions and highly controversial internal reconstructions that create an illusion of systemic reconstruction where there really is none". Nonetheless, Starostin concedes that Vajda's work "is, by all means, a step forward", and that it "may eventually point the way towards research on grammaticalization paths in Yeniseian and Na–Dene".

A 2013 study stated that the Ket people themselves had received the Dene–Yeniseian hypothesis well, being aware of similar physical features they observe on documentaries on television.

In 2015, Paul Kiparsky endorsed Dene–Yeniseian, saying that "the morphological parallelism and phonological similarities among corresponding affixes is most suggestive, but most compelling evidence for actual relationship comes from those sound correspondences which can be accounted for by independently motivated regular sound changes".

As of 2024, Lyle Campbell continues to doubt the validity of Dene–Yeniseian, saying that "neither the lexical evidence with putative sound correspondences nor the morphological evidence adduced has proven sufficient to support a genealogical relationship between Na–Dene and Yeniseian".

In 2025, a team of geneticists provided evidence that the ancient Paleo-Siberian genetic contribution to Athabaskan populations in Alaska stemmed from a population that lived to the west of Lake Baikal in the Late Neolithic and Bronze Age, and that this population also contributed genetically to modern Yeniseian populations. The authors of the study interpret this as "providing the first genetic data in support of the 'Dene-Yeniseian' hypothesis."

== Phonology ==
The phonology proposed by Edward Vajda is:

	Front	Central	Back
Close	*i *ij *iw		*u *uj *uw
Mid	*e *ej *ew		*o *oj *ow
Open		*a *aj *aw	

		Bilabial	Alveolar	Postalveolar	Retroflex	Palatal	Labiovelar	Velar	Uvular
Nasal		*m	*n				*ŋʷ	*ŋ	
Plosive	voiceless	*p	*t		*tʳ [ʈ]	*c	*kʷ	*k	*q
Plosive	voiced	*b	*d		*dʳ [ɖ]	*ɟ	*ɡʷ	*ɡ	*ɢ
Affricate	voiceless		*ts	*č [t͡ʃ]					
Affricate	voiced			*ǰ [d͡ʒ]					
Fricative			*s	*š [ʃ]	*sʳ [ʂ]	*ç	*xʷ	*x	*χ
Lateral			*ɬ	*tɬ					
Approximant		*w				*j			
Rhotic					*r				

=== Consonant Correspondences ===
This phonological chart shows the proposed correspondences between Proto-Yeniseian consonants and Proto-Na-Dene consonants.

Proto-Dene-Yeniseian consonant correspondences
PDY	Proto-Yeniseian	Proto-Na-Dene
*m	*b, *m	*ʔw, *◌̃ʔ
*n	*d, *n	*n, (*ñ)
*ŋ	*ŋ	*ŋ
*ŋʷ	*ŋʷ	*ŋʷ
*p	*p	*h
*t	*t	*t
*tʳ	*tʳ	*kʷ
*c	*c	*kʲ
*kʷ	*kʷ	*kʷ, (*č)
*k	*k	*k
*q	*q	*q
*b	*b	*kʷʼ (Athabaskan-Eyak) / *ʔ(u) (Tlingit)
*d	*d	*d
*dʳ	*dʳ	*ɡʷ
*ɟ	*ɟ	*ɡʲ
*ɡʷ	*ɡʷ	*ɡʷ, (*ǰ)
*g	*g	*g
*ɢ	*ɢ	*ɢ
*ts	*t, *s	*ts
*č	*č	*č
*ǰ	*ǰ	*ǰ
*s	*s	*s
*š	*š	*š
*sʳ	*s	*š
*ç	*ç	*xʲ
*xʷ	*xʷ	*xʷ
*x	*x	*x
*χ	*χ	*χ
*ɬ	*ɬ	*ɬ
*tɬ	*(t)ɬ	*(t)ɬ
*w	*w	*w
*j	*j	*j
*r	*Ø, *r	*χ

=== Diphthong Reflexes ===
The proposed diphthongs of Proto-Dene-Yeniseian are used to explain various phonological aspects of its descendants. In Proto-Yeniseian, diphthongs are used to explain the development of tone in the Kettic and Kottic languages.

Proto(-Dene)-Yeniseian vowel reflexes in the Yeniseian languages
Proto(-Dene)-Yeniseian	Ket	Kott
*i	i’	i
*e	e’	e
*a	a’	a
*o	o’, əʼ	o, u
*u	u’, ɨʼ	u
*ij	ī	î
*ej	ē	ê
*aj	ɨʼ, i’, ā	â, ê
*oj	ɤ̄	ô
*uj	ū, ɨ̄	û, î
*iw	ɨʼ	î
*ew	əʼ	î, ê
*aw	ō, ɨʼ	â
*ow	o’	ô, au
*uw	u’	û

== Selected cognates ==
#	Gloss	Ket	Proto-Yeniseian	Navajo	Proto-Dene	Tlingit
1	stone	ты'сь (tɨˀsʲ)	*cew-ç	tsé	*tseˑ	shaa ("mountain")
2	head	туʼ (tuˀ), тыʼ (tɨˀ)	*ceŋʷ	a-tsiiʼ	*tsiʼ	shá
3	foot	киʼсь (kiˀsʲ)	*kajš	a-keeʼ	N/A	xʼaash ("cheek of buttock")
4	shamanizing, curing by singing	сенаӈ (sʲɛ́naŋ, "shaman")	*-xejn	sin, sìn ("song, medicine song")	*-xʸən, *-ɣʸən ("to act as a shaman")	-saʼn ("to heal by singing"), at shí ("singing")
5	fire, to burn	боʼк (bɔˀk, "fire")	*beg ("fire")	-béézh ("to boil")	*-weˑdžʳ ("to cook, to boil")	-ook ("to boil")
6	sun	и (ī), иʼ (iˀ, "day")	*xʷaj	shá	*šʷaˑ	N/A (cf. Eyak xʷah)
7	birch tree	ӄыʼй (qɨˀj, "birch tree bark")	*qiwχ ("birch tree bark")	kʼish ("alder tree")	*qˀəx, *qʼəš ("alder tree")	N/A
8.a	they rub, they smear, they spread	кит (-kīˑt)	*-tɬijt	(cf. Tsuut'ina -tɬìy)	*-tɬαɣ̇ ~ *-ɬ-tɬαɣ̇	N/A
8.b.	oil, suet, tallow	кыʼт (kɨˀt)	*tɬiwdʳ	N/A	*tɬαɣ̇ ("grease, ointment"), *tɬαx̣ ("fat, oil, tallow")	N/A
9.a	animate subject lies in a horizontal position	та (-tāˑ, also found in numerous fossilized compounds)	*-tej	-si-tą́	*-teˑ	tá ("sleep"), -taa ("a.s. sleeps")
9.b	mat, flooring, bedding	атль (atlʲ)	*tej-ɬ	ni-teel ("a.s. is wide")	*te̓ˑ-ɬ	N/A (cf. Eyak teˀɬ)
10.a	night	си (sʲīˑ)	*çaj	N/A	N/A	xi-/xei- (found in xi.áat, xei.át, xee.át ("dawn"))
10.b	night passes, it dawns; overnight stay	сааль (sáàlʲ, sâːlʲ, "overnight stay at a campsite")	*çaj-ɬ	N/A	N/A	xáanaa ("evening") (cf. Eyak -seːɬ ("evening, it becomes evening"))
10.c	a dark color; color of the night	съʼн (sʲʌˀn, "blue; green; grey; brown")	*çaj-Vŋʷ ("dark blue, green, gray")	łi-zhin ("a.s. is black")	*žəŋʸ ("black")	N/A
11	willow tree, willow bushes	дълькит (dʌ̄lʲɣit, dʌ́lʲɣit) (cf. Yugh дъъʼль (dʌ̀ːˀlʲ))	*ǰewtɬ	chʼil ("plant; canopy")	*tšʼʳǝ̓tɬʼ ("underbrush; small willow trees")	chʼáalʼ
12	various roots with the common semantic breach of an extendable or a protruding object	ляӈат (lʲáŋat, "hand"), ля (lʲāˑ, "barb, thorn; barb of a fishing hook, tooth of a fishing pike")	*ɬaw ("extension, protrusion")	bi-łąąd ("end, point, tip"), á-laʼ ("hand")	*ɬaˑ ("tip, end, point")	luxʼaa ("tip, extremity"), lú ("nose")
13	a charred object, soot	ду' (duˀ, "smoke, soot")	*dukʷ ("smoke, soot")	tʼeesh ("charcoal, ash")	*tʼuˑtšʼ ~ *tʼe̓ˑš ~ *tʼeˑtšʼ ("charcoal")	tʼoochʼ ("charcoal; black")
14	liver	сеӈ (sʲɛ̄ŋ)	*seŋʷ	a-zid	*-zə̓tʼ	N/A (cf. Eyak sahd)
15	ear	огдэ (ɔ́gdɛ)	*oɢd ~ *odɢ	a-jaaʼ	*džəx̣	gúk

== Classification ==
Dene–Yeniseian is generally classified as follows:

- Dene–Yeniseian
  - Yeniseian
  - Na-Dene
    - Tlingit
    - - Eyak
      - Athabaskan

=== Sicoli & Holton (2014) ===
Using computational phylogenetic methods, Sicoli & Holton (2014) proposed that Dene–Yeniseian did not split into the two primary branches Na–Dene and Yeniseian, but rather into four primary branches. Yeniseian is upheld as a single branch, whereas Na–Dene is assumed to be paraphyletic, being divided into several primary branches instead. Based on their classification, they suggest that Yeniseian represents a back-migration from Beringia back to Asia.

- Dene-Yeniseian (Sicoli & Holton, 2014)
  - Yeniseian
    - Tlingit
    - Eyak
  - South Pacific Coast Athabaskan (California)
  - Athabaskan (excluding South Pacific Coast Athabaskan)

However, this phylogenetic study was criticized as methodologically flawed by Yanovich (2020), since it did not employ sufficient input data to generate a robust tree that does not depend on the initial choice of the "tree prior", i.e. the model for the tree generation. In addition, Wilson (2023) has argued that a cluster of related technology words in proto–Athabaskan and Yeniseian languages suggests a linguistic continuum between the two continents that extended well into the Common Era, clouding any conclusive evidence for the back-migration model.

== Proposed external classifications ==
=== Sino-Tibetan ===
Edward Vajda's Dene–Yeniseian proposal outlined in A Siberian link with Na-Dene languages included a footnote where he dismissed hypothetical language families such as Altaic, Amerind, Khoisan, Nilo-Saharan, and Na-Dene when including Haida, as "urban legends". However, he suggested that the possibility of a relationship between Sino-Tibetan and Na-Dene or Yeniseian might warrant serious investigation.

As noted by Tailleur and Werner, some of the earliest proposals of genetic relations of Yeniseian, by M.A. Castrén (1856), James Byrne (1892), and G.J. Ramstedt (1907), suggested that Yeniseian was a northern relative of the Sino-Tibetan languages. These ideas were followed much later by Kai Donner and Karl Bouda. A 2008 study found further evidence for a possible relation between Yeniseian and Sino-Tibetan, citing several possible cognates. Gao Jingyi (2014) identified twelve Sinitic and Yeniseian shared etymologies that belonged to the basic vocabulary, and argued that these Sino-Yeniseian etymologies could not be loans from either language into the other.

The "Sino-Caucasian" hypothesis of Sergei Starostin posits that the Yeniseian languages form a clade with Sino-Tibetan, which he called Sino-Yeniseian. The Sino-Caucasian hypothesis has been expanded by others to "Dene–Caucasian" to include the Na-Dene languages of North America, Burushaski, Basque and, occasionally, Etruscan. A narrower binary Dene–Yeniseian family has recently been well received. The validity of the rest of the family, however, is viewed as doubtful or rejected by nearly all historical linguists. An updated tree by Georgiy Starostin now groups Na-Dene with Sino-Tibetan and Yeniseian with Burushaski (Karasuk hypothesis).

George van Driem does not believe that Sino-Tibetan (which he calls "Trans-Himalayan") and Yeniseian are related language families. However, he argues that Yeniseian speakers once populated the North China Plain and that Proto-Sinitic speakers assimilated them when they migrated to the region. As a result, Sinitic acquired creoloid characteristics when it came to be used as a lingua franca among ethnolinguistically diverse populations. Vajda's Dene–Yeniseian proposal renewed interest among linguists such as Geoffrey Caveney (2014) to look into support for the Sino-Dene hypothesis. Caveney considered a link between Sino-Tibetan, Na-Dene, and Yeniseian to be plausible but did not support the hypothesis that Sino-Tibetan and Na-Dene were related to the Caucasian languages (Sino-Caucasian and Dene–Caucasian).

=== Dene–Caucasian ===
Instead of forming a separate family, Starostin (2012) believes that both Yeniseian and Na–Dene are part of a much larger grouping called Dene–Caucasian. Starostin states that the two families are related in a large sense, but there is no special relationship between them that would suffice to create a separate family between these two language families. This proposal has otherwise been largely discredited by the linguistic community.

== See also ==
- Settlement of the Americas – Prehistoric migration from Asia to the Americas
- Genetic history of Indigenous peoples of the Americas § Haplogroup Q – Genetics on the peopling of the Americas
- Karasuk languages – Hypothetical Asian language family
- Uralo-Siberian languages – a hypothetical language family consisting of Uralic, Yukaghir, and Eskaleut
