= Bible translations into Tlingit =

A portion of the Bible, Matthew's gospel, was first translated into Tlingit of Alaska by Ivan Nadezhdin of the Russian Orthodox Church in 1859. Although used in Churches, this was never published. According to Dr. Michael Krauss it is "a hardly readable, slavishly literal translation, and with a writing system so faulty that the spread of literacy would have been severely impeded even if there had been good translations". Nadezhdin also translated the sections from John's gospel that were used for Orthodox Easter liturgy.

Another early translation, of the 23rd Psalm, made by an indigenous Tlingit, when back-translated, read "The Lord is my goat-hunter; I don't want him. He knocks me down on the mountains, he drags me down to the beach ... ".

Constance Naish and Gillian Story, both of Wycliffe Bible Translators, translated John's gospel into Tlingit—this was published in 1969 as Dikée ankáwoo doo yéet dàt John-ch kawshixidee yooxu̕tunk.

A few selected verses from both testaments were translated for their hymnal Utk'-uheenee X'usheex'ee. They also produced a 17-page booklet "The Brass serpent and other stories", containing stories from the Old Testament.

Andrew P. Johnson translated parts of the Bible into Tlingit and recorded it on tapes that he then distributed. Tlingit Rev. George Benson also translated parts of the Bible into Tlingit. Walter Soboleff, a Tlingit elder, said of him, "He could open the Bible and make a free translation of English into the Tlingit language ... And he could do it so beautifully." Benson, and perhaps Johnson, could have been working together with the Wycliffe Translators.

Translation	John 3:16
Naish/Story 1969	Dikée Anḵáwoo-ch ḵónux̲ woosix̲ún yúh lingít ànee. Uh uyúh tléinux̲ doo jèe yéi yuteeyee doo Yéet hàhdei uh jeewunúḵ. Ldukút adoo súh doo éek' uh hèenee, tléil koot kei kw'g̲usgèet; 'l yun shoowjix̲inee x̲'uséikw ḵo.àh doo jèe yéi kw'g̲utée.
