= National Bilingual Materials Development Center =

Defunct division of the University of Alaska Anchorage

The National Bilingual Materials Development Center was a division of the Rural Education department of the University of Alaska Anchorage, which compiled educational materials for Alaska Native languages in the 1970s. It was directed by Dr. Tupou Pulu. The Center collaborated closely with the Alaska Native Language Center in Fairbanks.

The materials produced by NBMDC were primarily of two types: (i) elementary readers with accompanying line drawings; and (ii) "junior" dictionaries with entries in English and translations into Native language. Many of the materials made use of common templates so that text could be easily adapted from one language to another.

With the closing of the Center the rights to publication were passed to the Alaska Native Language Center, which still distributes and reprints many NBMDC publications. Archival copies can also be found at the Alaska Native Language Archive.
