= Alaska Native Language Center =

Research center for Alaska's Native languages

The Alaska Native Language Center, established in 1972 in Fairbanks, Alaska, is a research center focusing on the research and documentation of the Native languages of Alaska. It publishes grammars, dictionaries, folklore collections and research materials, as well as hosting an extensive archive of written materials relating to Eskimo, North Athabaskan and related languages. The Center provides training, materials and consultation for educators, researchers and others working with Alaska Native languages. The closely affiliated Alaska Native Language Program offers degrees in Central Yup'ik and Inupiaq at the University of Alaska Fairbanks, and works toward the documentation and preservation of these languages.

== Language map ==
In 1974, Michael Krauss published a language map of Alaska, which he later updated in 1982. It has remained the standard since then. In the summer of 2011, the Alaska Native Language Center made an update to Krauss's map. One of the biggest reasons for this update was that some of the names of these languages had changed over the years. While there was not a dramatic change in the updated map, the new edition is entirely digital.

== Alaska Native languages ==
Language	Population	Speakers	Percent Speakers
Ahtna	500	80	%16.00
Aleut	2,200	300	%13.64
Alutiiq/Sugpiaq	3,000	400	%13.33
Dena'ina	x	x	x
Deg Xinag	275	40	%14.55
Eyak	50	0	%0.00
Gwich'in	1,100	300	%27.27
Haida	600	15	%2.50
Hän	50	12	%24.00
Holikachuk	200	12	%6.00
Inupiat	13,500	3,000	%22.22
Koyukon	2,300	300	%13.04
Tanana	380	30	%7.89
Tanacross	220	65	%29.55
Tlingit	10,000	500	%5.00
Tsimshian	1,300	70	%5.38
Upper Kuskokwim	160	40	%25.00
Upper Tanana	x	x	x
Yup'ik, Central Alaskan	21,000	10,000	%47.62
Yupik, Siberian	1,100	1,050	%95.45

- Information in this table was retrieved from the Alaska Native Languages Center.

== See also ==
- Alaska Native Language Archive
- Alaska Native languages
- Eskimo–Aleut languages
- Athabaskan languages
- Michael Krauss, ANLC founder
- Dené–Yeniseian languages
