= Alaska Native Language Archive =

Library of native languages from Alaska, United States

Coordinates: 64.856828°N 147.8198919°W

The Michael E. Krauss Alaska Native Language Archive (ANLA) in Fairbanks, Alaska, is an extensive repository for manuscripts and recordings documenting the Native Languages of Alaska. The Archive was created as part of the Alaska Native Language Center by state legislation in 1972. In 2009 the Archive was administratively separated and now exists as a sister organization to the Alaska Native Language Center, collaborating on numerous language efforts in Alaska.

ANLA is part of the Alaska & Polar Regions Special Collections and Archives at the University of Alaska Fairbanks Rasmuson Library. It was officially renamed in honor of Michael E. Krauss at a dedication ceremony on February 22, 2013. ANLA is a member of the Open Language Archives Community and the Digital Endangered Languages and Musics Archives Network.

Dr. Siri Tuttle was appointed Director of ANLA in 2016.

== See also ==
- Alaska Native Language Center
- Alaska Native languages
