= Siri Tuttle =

American linguist

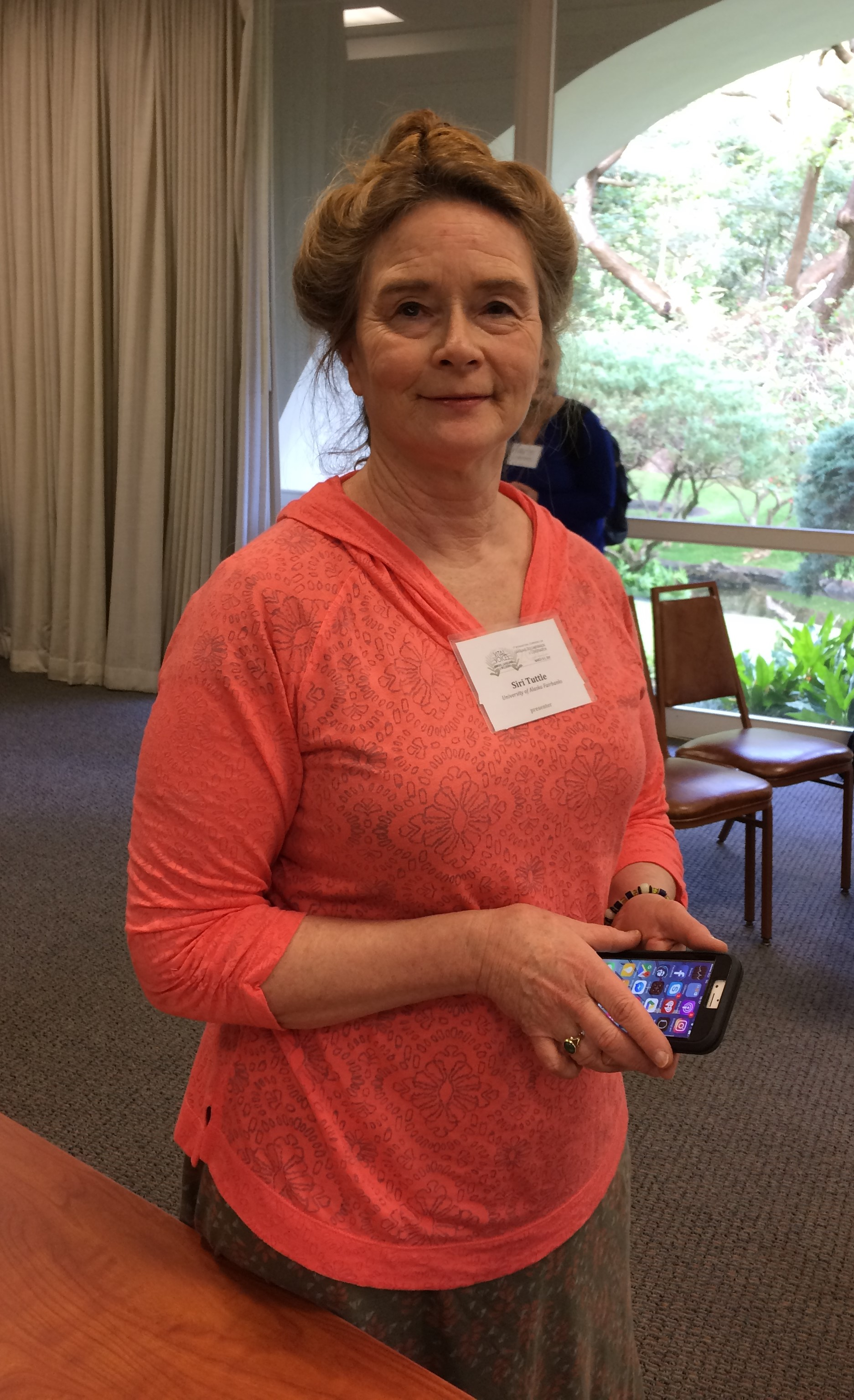
- Tuttle at the International Conference of Language Documentation and Conservation in Manoa

Academic work
- Discipline: Linguist
- Sub-discipline: Athabaskan languages
- Institutions: Alaska Native Language Center

Siri Tuttle is an American linguist and professor specializing in Navajo linguistics, Athabaskan (Dene) languages, phonetics, phonology, and language documentation.

She is Professor of Navajo Linguistics at Navajo Technical University, where she has taught since 2021.

She is the former director of the Alaska Native Language Center, the Alaska Native Language Archive, and a former Associate Professor of Linguistics at the University of Alaska, Fairbanks. She specializes in Dene (Athabascan) languages of interior Alaska and has contributed to the fields of acoustic phonetics, phonology, and morphology.

== Education ==
Tuttle earned her Ph.D. in linguistics from the University of Washington in 1998. Her dissertation, Metrical and Tonal Structures in Tanana Athabaskan, was supervised by Sharon Hargus and examined prosodic and tonal structures in Tanana Athabaskan languages.

She completed her M.A. in linguistics at the University of Washington in 1990 with a thesis titled Stress and Vowel Length in Tolowa, also under Sharon Hargus.

From 1998 to 2001, she was a postdoctoral fellow in the Department of Linguistics at University of California, Los Angeles, where she studied phonetics under Peter Ladefoged, focusing on Western and Eastern Apache.

== Career ==
Tuttle joined the University of Alaska Fairbanks in 2003 as Assistant Professor in the Alaska Native Language Center and Linguistics Program. She was promoted to Associate Professor in 2009 and later to Professor. Her teaching and research included graduate and undergraduate courses in phonology, phonetics, Athabaskan grammar, morphology, syntax, and field methods.

Between 2016 and 2018, she served as Director of the Alaska Native Language Archive, leading archival development and fundraising efforts. From 2018 to 2021, she served as Director of the Alaska Native Language Center, overseeing research, publication, and language teaching for Alaska Native languages.

In 2021, she joined Navajo Technical University as Professor of Navajo Linguistics, where she teaches courses such as Navajo Verb System, Navajo Morphology, Phonology, Semantics and Syntax, and Introduction to Navajo Linguistics.

She also co-directed the Institute for Collaborative Language Research (CoLang) in 2016 and has taught at the Linguistic Society of America, Northern Arizona University, the Navajo Language Academy, and the Technische Universität Berlin.

== Research ==
Tuttle is active in Lower Tanana language revitalization efforts, and has published reference materials such as the Benhti Kokht’ana Kenaga’: Lower Tanana Pocket Dictionary. She is well known for her documentary and descriptive language work in Lower Tanana and Ahtna, and has also conducted linguistic fieldwork in New Mexico, California, and Arizona.

One of her major areas of work is prosody beyond the word, including how pitch, duration, loudness, and intonation function in discourse and narrative structure. Her 2023 chapter, Prosody Beyond the Word, in The Languages and Linguistics of Indigenous North America examines how prosodic features organize intonation units and discourse across Indigenous North American languages.

She has also worked extensively on grammatical tone and negation in Alaskan Dene languages. Her 2024 article with Olga Lovick, “Pitch patterns in standard negation in Alaskan Dene and the development of grammatical tone,” published in the International Journal of American Linguistics, analyzes how negative constructions contributed to the historical development of tone systems in Dene languages. This work is considered an important contribution to understanding tone development in Athabaskan linguistics.

Tuttle has also contributed to language archive accessibility and digital preservation, particularly through the Alaska Native Language Archive. Her NSF-funded RAPID project (2017) focused on increasing accessibility and discoverability of archival materials for Alaska Native communities, helping connect historical documentation with modern revitalization efforts.

Her earlier phonetic research includes studies of Apache prosody, stem-final ejectives in Ahtna, vowel systems in Upper and Lower Tanana, and comparative/superlative constructions across Alaskan Athabascan languages. Her article “Duration, Intonation and Prominence in Apache” remains widely cited in Athabaskan prosody research.

Across her career, Tuttle’s scholarship is noted for combining formal linguistic analysis with practical community-based language work, especially in documentation, teaching materials, literacy development, and support for Indigenous language sovereignty.

=== Song lyric and ethnomusicological research ===
From approximately 2010 to 2021, Tuttle expanded her research beyond Athabaskan linguistics to investigate the relationship between language, music, and oral tradition within the Lower Tanana (Denaakk'e) community. Working in collaboration with Swedish ethnomusicologist Håkan Lundström, she documented and analyzed traditional Tanana song practices, particularly memorial songs and other ceremonial vocal traditions preserved by elders in Minto, Alaska. Their interdisciplinary research combined linguistic analysis, ethnomusicology, and community-based documentation to examine how melody, rhythm, lexical tone, and poetic structure interact in Athabaskan song performance. The project emphasized collaborative research with Indigenous knowledge holders and contributed to the preservation of endangered cultural traditions alongside language revitalization efforts.

Tuttle's research on Tanana song culture examined the continuum between speech and song, exploring how vocal performance encodes linguistic, musical, and cultural knowledge. Her publications addressed topics including the structure of memorial songs, the phonetics of song vocables, and the interaction of melody and language in Lower Tanana oral traditions. This work formed part of broader international research on endangered vocal traditions and informed interdisciplinary scholarship on music, language, and cultural transmission. Her studies have also contributed to comparative research on the universality and diversity of human song and to ongoing efforts to document and sustain Indigenous expressive traditions in Alaska.

== Publications ==
=== Books ===
- (2009) Tuttle, Siri. Ahtna Athabascan Grammar Reference. Chistochina: Mount Sanford Tribal Consortium.
- (2009) Tuttle, Siri. Benhti Kokht’ana Kenaga’: Lower Tanana Pocket Dictionary. Fairbanks: Alaska Native Language Center. ISBN 978-1555001001

=== Articles ===
- Lovick, Olga; Tuttle, Siri G. (2024-10-01). "Pitch Patterns in Standard Negation in Alaskan Dene and the Development of Grammatical Tone". International Journal of American Linguistics. 90 (4): 397–444. doi:10.1086/731661. ISSN 0020-7071.
- Lovick, Olga; Tuttle, Siri G. (2024-10-01). "Pitch Patterns in Standard Negation in Alaskan Dene and the Development of Grammatical Tone". International Journal of American Linguistics. 90 (4): 397–444. doi:10.1086/731661. ISSN 0020-7071.
- Tuttle, Siri G.; Lovick, Olga; Núñez-Ortiz, Isabel (2011-11-11). "Vowels of Upper Tanana Athabascan". Journal of the International Phonetic Association. 41 (3): 283–312. doi:10.1017/s002510031100034x. ISSN 0025-1003.
- Tuttle, Siri G. (2018). "Comparative and Superlative Constructions in Alaskan Athabascan Languages". Linguistic Discovery. 16 (1). doi:10.1349/ps1.1537-0852.a.487. ISSN 1537-0852.
- Lovick, Olga; Tuttle, Siri G. (2012). "The Prosody of Dena'ina Narrative Discourse". International Journal of American Linguistics. 78 (3): 293–334. doi:10.1086/665671. ISSN 0020-7071.
- Tuttle, Siri G.; Lovick, Olga; Núñez-Ortiz, Isabel (2011-11-11). "Vowels of Upper Tanana Athabascan". Journal of the International Phonetic Association. 41 (3): 283–312. doi:10.1017/s002510031100034x. ISSN 0025-1003.
- Tuttle, Siri G (2008-01-01). "Phonetics and word definition in Ahtna Athabascan". Linguistics. 46 (2). doi:10.1515/ling.2008.015. ISSN 0024-3949.
- Tuttle, Siri G. (1998-05-01). "Ejectives in Tanana Athabaskan". The Journal of the Acoustical Society of America. 103 (5_Supplement): 3086–3086. doi:10.1121/1.422920. ISSN 0001-4966.
- Tuttle, Siri (2000-11-01). "The effects of stress and final position on sounds of Jicarilla Apache". The Journal of the Acoustical Society of America. 108 (5_Supplement): 2466–2466. doi:10.1121/1.4743087. ISSN 0001-4966.
- Jacobs, Sue - Ellen; Tuttle, Siri G.; Martinez, Esther (1998). "Multimedia Technology in Language and Culture Restoration Efforts at San Juan Pueblo: A Brief History of the Development of the Tewa Language Project". Wicazo Sa Review. 13 (2): 45. doi:10.2307/1409145. ISSN 0749-6427.
- Hargus, Sharon; Tuttle, Siri G. (1997). "Augmentation as affixation in Athabaskan languages". Phonology. 14 (2): 177–220. doi:10.1017/s0952675797003394. ISSN 0952-6757.
