= Eung-Do Cook =

South Korean–Canadian linguist (1935–2025)

- Born: February 3, 1935; Seosan, Japanese-occupied Korea
- Died: March 8, 2025 (aged 90); British Columbia, Canada
- Education: Master's degree in TESL from University of Hawaiʻi, Ph.D. in Linguistics from University of Alberta
- Occupation: Linguist
- Known for: Research on Athabaskan languages
- Spouse: Myung-Sook Shin
- Children: 2

Eung-Do "Ed" Cook (Korean: 국응도; February 3, 1935 – March 8, 2025) was a South Korean–born Canadian linguist who specialized in Athabaskan and other First Nations languages.

== Early life and education ==
Eung-Do Cook, also known as Ed, was born in Seosan, Korea, Empire of Japan, on February 3, 1935. After growing up and studying first in Korea, he earned a scholarship to pursue a degree in teaching English as a second language at the University of Hawaiʻi, and received his Master's there in 1965. He earned a Ph.D. in linguistics from the University of Alberta in 1968.

== Career ==
In 1969, Cook became an assistant professor at the University of Calgary. He was promoted to associate in 1972 and full professor in 1975. From 1976 until 1985 he was head of the Department of Linguistics. He retired from his professorship in 2000, although he continued to publish research despite health problems.

During his career, he focused on the study of Canadian indigenous languages, especially the Athabaskan Tsilhqotʼin, Dene Suline, and Tsuutʼina languages, publishing grammars of all three of these. His A Sarcee Grammar was described as a "major contribution to the Athapaskan literature" by Keren Rice, while the 2013 A Tsilhqútʼín Grammar was labeled "very thorough" and "the culmination of [...] research [...] spanning forty years" by Sonya Bird.

== Personal life and death ==
He met his wife, Myung-Sook Shin, at the University of Hawaiʻi while studying there. They had two sons together.

He died at the age of 90 in British Columbia, on March 8, 2025.

== Selected works ==
- Cook, Eung-Do (1984). A Sarcee Grammar. Vancouver: University of British Columbia Press. ISBN 0-7748-0200-6.
- — — (2004). A Grammar of Dëne Sųłiné (Chipewyan). Winnipeg: Algonquian and Iroquoian Linguistics. ISBN 0-921064-17-9. OCLC 54906360.
- — — (2013). A Tsilhqút’ín Grammar. First Nations Languages. University of British Columbia Press. ISBN 9780774865708.
- Cook, Eung-Do & Rice, Keren (eds.) (1989). Athapaskan Linguistics: Current Perspectives on a Language Family. De Gruyter Mouton. ISBN 978-3110111668
