= Tlingit language =

Na-Dene language of southern Alaska

Tlingit
- Lingít
- Pronunciation: /ɬɪ̀nkɪ́t/
- Native to: United States, Canada
- Region: Alaska, British Columbia, Yukon, Washington
- Ethnicity: 10,000 Tlingit (1995)
- Speakers: ~50 highly-proficient L1 speakers, 10 highly-proficient L2 speakers (2020, United States); 120 in Canada (2016 census)
- Language family: Na-Dene: Tlingit
- Dialects: Northern; Transitional; Southern; Tongass †
- Writing system: Tlingit alphabet (Latin script)

Official status
- Official language in: Alaska

Language codes
- ISO 639-2: tli
- ISO 639-3: tli
- Glottolog: tlin1245
- ELP: Tlingit
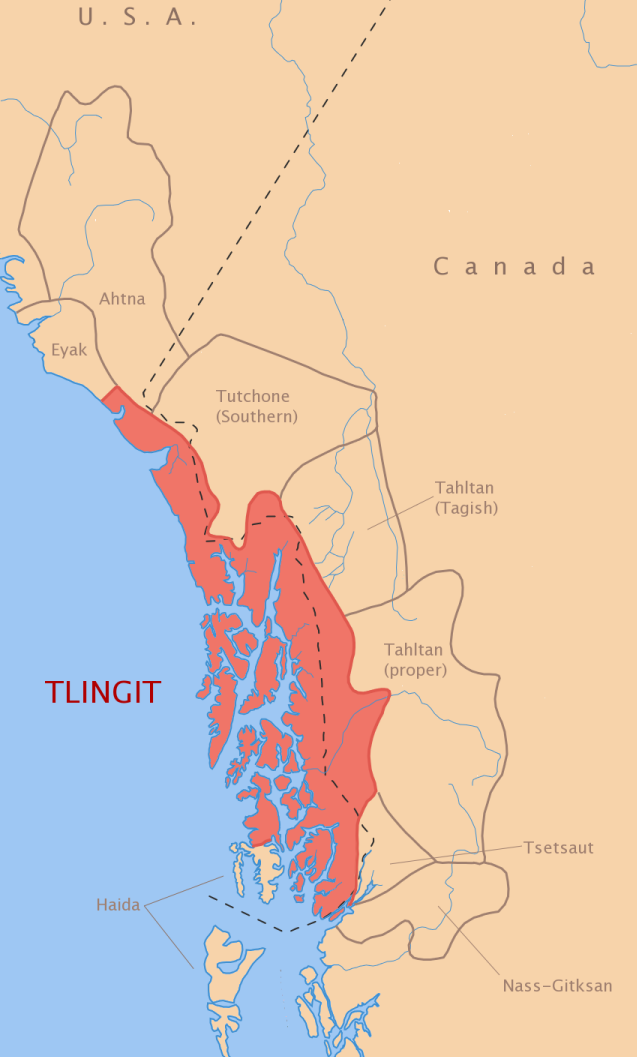

- Tlingit is classified as Critically Endangered by the UNESCO Atlas of the World's Languages in Danger.

Lingít "People of the Tides"
- Person: Lingít
- People: Lingít
- Language: Lingít (Lingít x̱ʼéinax̱)
- Country: Lingít Aaní

Two Tlingit speakers, recorded as part of the International Conference on Language Documentation & Conservation at the University of Hawaiʻi at Mānoa

Tlingit (Lingít, pronounced [ɬɪ̀nkɪ́t]; English: /ˈklɪŋ.kɪt/, KLING-kit) is an endangered language indigenous to Southeast Alaska and Western Canada spoken by the Tlingit people. It is generally agreed to form an independent branch of the Na-Dene language family. Although the number of speakers is declining, there are several revitalization and second-language programs in Southeast Alaska.

Missionaries of the Russian Orthodox Church were the first to develop a written version of Tlingit using the Cyrillic script. After the Alaska Purchase, Tlingit language use was suppressed by the United States government, though preservation programs were introduced beginning in the 20th century. Today, Tlingit is spoken natively by perhaps only 100 elders.

Tlingit's placement in the Na-Dene family has provoked much debate over the last century, with most scholars now considering it to form a separate branch in the phylum, the other being Eyak–Athabaskan (including Eyak and the Athabaskan languages). Tlingit has also attracted interest due to its unusual phonology, especially compared to Indo-European languages, and its morphological complexity.

== History ==
The early history of Tlingit is poorly known, mostly because there was no written record until Robert de Lamanon collected numerals and five nouns during the La Pérouse expedition in 1786. The language appears to have spread northward from the Ketchikan–Saxman area towards Icy Bay since certain conservative features are reduced gradually from south to north. In fact, Tlingit northerly expansion into Eyak and Athabaskan territories was still taking place during the time after European contact.

The first Tlingit orthography and literacy program were created by the Russian Orthodox church during the Russian colonization of Alaska. However, following the 1867 purchase of Alaska by the United States, native languages were suppressed in favor of English language homogeneity and assimilation. It was not until the mid-20th century that the language literacy movement would regain ground, but the total number of speakers continued to decline. Beginning in the late 20th century, revitalization and preservation programs were also introduced.

== Classification ==
Tlingit is currently classified as a distinct and separate branch of Na-Dene, an indigenous language family of North America. In 1915, Edward Sapir argued for its inclusion in the Na-Dene family, a claim that was subsequently debated by Franz Boas, P. E. Goddard, and many other prominent linguists of the time. Its inclusion in the family has proven controversial due to lack of common vocabulary despite shared phonological and grammatical features.

Studies in the late 20th century by Heinz-Jürgen Pinnow and Michael E. Krauss showed a strong connection to Eyak and hence to the Athabaskan languages, which led to consensus among American linguists that the Na-Dene family included Tlingit. Jeff Leer has proposed that the seeming lack of shared vocabulary between Tlingit and the Athabaskan languages can be explained by a process of hybridization within Tlingit.

Sapir initially proposed a connection between Tlingit and Haida, but the debate over Na-Dene gradually excluded Haida from the discussion. Haida is now considered an isolate, with some borrowing from its long proximity with Tlingit. However, some contemporary linguists still hold that Haida is part of the Na-Dene family, such as John Enrico, a specialist in Haida.

The first proposal linking Na-Dene and thus Tlingit to the Yeniseian languages of Siberia was made by Italian linguist Alfredo Trombetti in 1923. In the early 2000s, Edward Vajda presented empirical evidence for the existence of this super family, Dene–Yeniseian. Although support for the hypothesis has not been universal, it has been called "the first demonstration of a plausible genealogical link between languages of Eurasia and languages of the Americas".

== Geographic distribution ==
The Tlingit language was traditionally spoken from near the mouth of the Copper River at Controller Bay down the open coast of the Gulf of Alaska and throughout almost all of the islands of the Alexander Archipelago in Southeast Alaska. It is characterized by about four distinct dialects, but they are mostly mutually intelligible, indicating relatively recent territorial expansion. Almost all of the area where the Tlingit language is endemic is contained within the modern borders of Alaska. The exception is an area known as "Inland Tlingit" that extends up the Taku River and into northern British Columbia and the Yukon around Atlin Lake (Áa Tlein "Big Lake") and Teslin Lake (Deisleen < Tás Tlein "Big Thread"), as well as around Tagish Lake near the Chilkoot Trail (Jilḵoot). There is a small group of speakers (about 30) in Washington as well.

=== Use and revitalization efforts ===
Tlingit is classified as critically endangered by UNESCO. In 2007, Golla reported a maximum population of 500 speakers in Alaska, and an additional 185 in Canada. The First Peoples' Cultural Council reported 2 fluent speakers in British Columbia out of an ethnic population of 400. James A. Crippen estimated in 2019 that between 100 and 200 people in the United States and Canada speak Tlingit as their native language, with the youngest of these over the age of 60.

Tlingit courses are available at the University of Alaska Southeast, taught in part by Lance Twitchell. In 2022, the university began offering these classes for free. Classes offered at a post-secondary level have produced several fluent L2 (second-language) speakers. The Alaska state legislature recognized Tlingit as an official language of Alaska in April 2014 when it passed bill HB 216, lending support to language revitalization.

== Dialects ==
Tlingit is divided into roughly four major dialects, all of which are mutually intelligible:

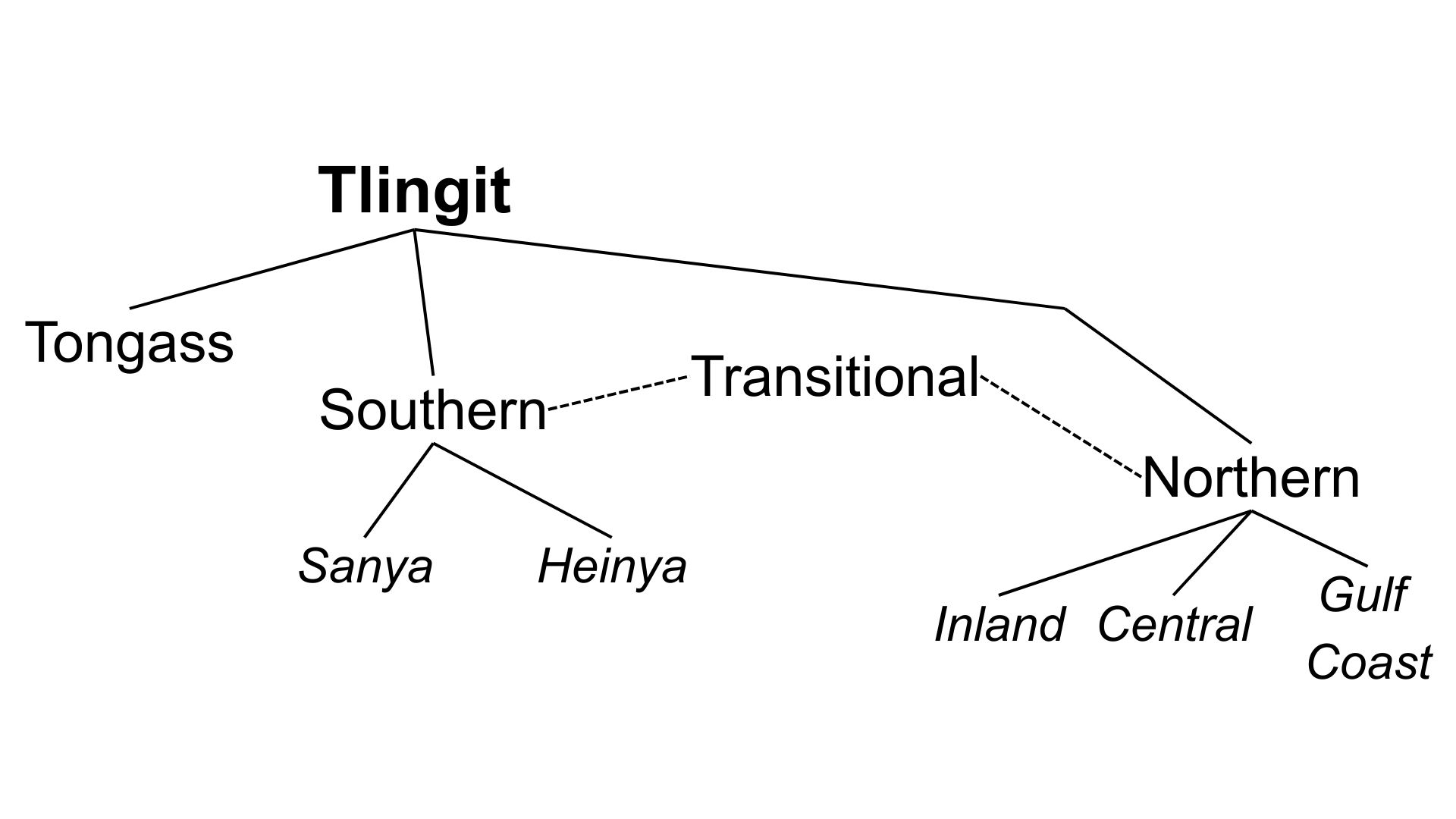
Diagram of Tlingit dialects

- The Northern dialect is spoken in a vast area south from Yakutat (Yaakwdáat) and Lituya Bay (Ltu.aa) to Angoon (Aangóon) and Sitka (Sheetʼká), also covering the area around Hoonah (Xunaa) and Juneau (Dzántikʼi Héeni).
  - The Inland Tlingit dialect, a subdialect of Northern, is spoken in Canada around Atlin Lake and Teslin Lake.
- The Transitional dialect, having features "in-between" those of the Northern and Southern dialects, was historically spoken in and around Kake (Ḵéex̱ʼ 'Daylight'), and Wrangell (Ḵaachx̱ana.áakʼw 'Ḵaachx̱an's Little Lake').
- The Southern subdialects of Sanya (Saanyaa) and Heinya (Heinyaa) are spoken from Sumner Strait south to the Alaska-Canada border, excepting the southern end of Prince of Wales Island, which is the land of the Kaigani Haida (Kʼaaykʼaani).
- Tongass Tlingit, the most divergent of the dialects, was once spoken south of Ketchikan (Kichx̱áan) to the Portland Canal, but died in the 1990s.

Most dialects of Tlingit can be classified into two-tone (Northern and Transitional) and three-tone (Southern) systems. Tongass Tlingit, however, has no tone, but rather a four-way register contrast between short, long, glottalized, and "fading" vowels. (In the last type, the onset of the vowel is articulated normally but the release is murmured, essentially a rapid opening of the glottis once articulation is begun, resulting in fading of volume and pitch.)

Jeff Leer has shown that the Tongass vowel system can directly derive the tonal features other dialects, so Krauss has supported the conclusion that the register contrast in Tongass gave rise to the tonal systems. Additionally, the Tongass system is quite similar to both systems of vowel modifications for Eyak and the one reconstructed for Proto-Athabaskan, suggesting that they retained features from Proto-Na-Dene which instead developed into tonal systems in most of the Athabaskan languages and the other dialects of Tlingit.

== Phonology ==
Tlingit has a complex phonological system compared to Indo-European languages such as English or Spanish. It has an almost complete series of ejective consonants accompanying its stop, fricative, and affricate consonants. The only missing consonant in the Tlingit ejective series is [ʃʼ]. The phonology is also typologically unusual because it has several laterals but no voiced [l] nor labials in most dialects, except for [m] and [p] in recent English loanwords.

=== Consonants ===
The consonants in the table are given in the IPA, with the popular orthography equivalents in brackets. Dialectal, obsolete, and marginal consonants are given in parentheses.

Tlingit Consonants
		Labial	Alveolar			Palatal (-alveolar)	Velar		Uvular		Glottal	
		Labial	plain	sibilant	lateral	Palatal (-alveolar)	plain	labial	plain	labial	plain	labial
Plosive/ Affricate	tenuis		t ⟨d⟩	ts ⟨dz⟩	tɬ ⟨dl⟩	tʃ ⟨j⟩	k ⟨g⟩	kʷ ⟨gw⟩	q ⟨g̱⟩	qʷ ⟨g̱w⟩	ʔ ⟨.⟩	(ʔʷ) ⟨.w⟩ (Note: Marginal; their realization is possibly an idiolectal phenomenon.)
Plosive/ Affricate	aspirated		tʰ ⟨t⟩	tsʰ ⟨ts⟩	tɬʰ ⟨tl⟩	tʃʰ ⟨ch⟩	kʰ ⟨k⟩	kʷʰ ⟨kw⟩	qʰ ⟨ḵ⟩	qʷʰ ⟨ḵw⟩		
Plosive/ Affricate	ejective		tʼ ⟨tʼ⟩	tsʼ ⟨tsʼ⟩	tɬʼ ⟨tlʼ⟩	tʃʼ ⟨chʼ⟩	kʼ ⟨kʼ⟩	kʷʼ ⟨kʼw⟩	qʼ ⟨ḵʼ⟩	qʷʼ ⟨ḵʼw⟩		
Fricative	tenuis			s ⟨s⟩	ɬ ⟨l⟩	ʃ ⟨sh⟩	x ⟨x⟩	xʷ ⟨xw⟩	χ ⟨x̱⟩	χʷ ⟨x̱w⟩	h ⟨h⟩	(hʷ) ⟨hw⟩
Fricative	ejective			sʼ ⟨sʼ⟩	ɬʼ ⟨lʼ⟩		xʼ ⟨xʼ⟩	xʷʼ ⟨xʼw⟩	χʼ ⟨x̱’⟩	χʷʼ ⟨x̱ʼw⟩		
Sonorant		(m) ⟨m⟩ (Note: The consonant m is a variant of w found in the Interior dialect; amsikóo ('[he] knew it') would be awsikóo in the Coastal dialects. It is thought that this consonant arose either from contact with Athabaskan languages like Tagish and Tutchone that have it, or that it is a vestige of a Pre-Tlingit phonemic m that merged with w in all other dialects.)	n ⟨n⟩		(l) ⟨ll⟩ (Note: The consonant ll is an allophone of n that is now mostly obsolete, but still occasionally heard among older speakers. In the Interior dialect, it is partially phonemic, appearing in some Athabaskan and English loanwords (e.g., Alláaski for Alaska; this is Anáaski in other dialects).)	j ⟨y⟩	(ɰ) ⟨ÿ⟩ (Note: The consonant ÿ (/ɰ/) has very recently merged with y (/j/) or w (/w/) depending on the phonological environment, with w next to rounded vowels and labialized consonants, and y elsewhere. It is attested in audio recordings of speakers from the periphery of Tlingit territory, for instance among Tongass and Yakutat Tlingit speakers.)	w ⟨w⟩				

Phonetic analysis shows that all Tlingit word final non-ejective stops are unaspirated. This analysis also has phonological basis, as words with final non-ejective stops that are suffixed with vowels maintain a non-aspirated pronunciation. This is reflected by the orthography, which uses the graphemes for unaspirated sounds, ⟨d g g̱⟩, when a vowel is suffixed. For example, x̱aat [χaːt] ('root') becomes ax̱ x̱aadí [aχ χaːtí] ('my root').

Phonetic analysis also shows that the ejective fricatives in Tlingit are in fact true ejectives, with complete closure of the glottis before frication begins and the larynx raising in the same manner as with ejective stops. This contrasts with common analyses in some other languages with ejective fricatives, which considers them a sequence of fricative and glottal stop.

=== Vowels ===
Tlingit has eight phonemic vowels, four of these distinguished formally by length. However, shorter vowels are typically also pronounced more centralized, or less tense.

Tlingit Vowels
	Tense/Long		Lax/Short	
	front	back	front	back
close	iː ⟨ee⟩	uː ⟨oo⟩	ɪ ⟨i⟩	ʊ ⟨u⟩
non-close	eː ⟨ei⟩	aː ⟨aa⟩ (Note: Maddieson, Smith and Bessell describe this as "distinctly a back vowel", so it is properly represented as [ɑ].)	ɛ ⟨e⟩	ʌ ⟨a⟩

Word onset is always consonantal in Tlingit. Thus, in order to avoid a word starting with a vowel, an initial vowel is always preceded by either [ʔ] or [j]. The former is most common, while the latter occurs in conjunction with the prefix i-. For example:

ḵu- ÿu- ÿa- t'áa
INDH.OBJ- PERF- (ø, -D, +I)- hot
'the weather is hot'

But when the perfective prefix ÿu- is word-initial, the glottal stop appears to ensure that the word begins with a consonant.

∅- ÿu- ÿa- t'áa
3.NEU.OBJ- PERF- (ø, -D, +I)- hot
'it is hot'

In contrast, when prefixed with i-, the same verbal root (tʼaa, 'hot') becomes yatʼaa [jatʼaː] rather than *itʼaa [ʔitʼaː].

=== Tone ===
Tone is contrastive in all dialects of Tlingit but Tongass. In the Northern and Transitional dialects, there are high and low tones, and in the Southern dialect there is an additional falling tone. Rather than tone, Tongass Tlingit has a register system of vowel phonation and glottalization that corresponds to the tone systems of other dialects. An illustration of some of these correspondences can be seen below.

Tongass register			Southern tone			Northern tone			Example translation
notation	description	example	notation	description	example	notation	description	example	Example translation
V	short	sha	V́	high tone	shá	V́	high tone	shá	'head'
VV	long	shaa	V́V	long high tone	sháa	V́V	long high tone	sháa	'woman'
VV'	long glottalized	ḵaa'	V̂V	long falling tone	ḵâa	V́V	long high tone	ḵáa	'man'
VV`	long fading	aa`n	V̀V	long low tone	àan	V̀V	long low tone	aan	'land'

== Writing system ==
The very first instance of written Tlingit is from the La Pérouse expedition in 1786, where for example, tleixʼ ('one') was transcribed as "keirrk". A more formal orthography based on the Cyrillic alphabet was created by the Russians during their colonization of Alaska. However, after Alaska was acquired by the United States, native language literacy was discouraged, and until the latter half of the 20th century, Tlingit was only written by linguists.

The most widespread orthography used today is based on the transcription systems of some of these linguists, particularly Constance Naish and Gillian Story. Like other popular writing systems, it uses the letters for voiced obstruents to represent unaspirated sounds; e.g., ⟨d⟩ for /t/. Uvular sounds are distinguished from velars by an underline; that is, ⟨k ḵ⟩ for /kʰ qʰ/. Typing an underline was straightforward on the typewriters of the 20th century, but it is no longer so on modern computers. Thus, an alternative "email" orthography was developed in the 1990s that replaces the underline with an appended ⟨h⟩; so, ⟨ḵ⟩ becomes ⟨kh⟩, and so on.

The Inland Tlingit orthography does not use vowel digraphs. Instead, short high vowels are marked with an acute accent, long high vowels are marked with a circumflex, and long low vowels are marked with a grave accent. Short low vowels are unmarked. So, Coastal Tlingit ⟨áa⟩ and ⟨aa⟩ are Inland ⟨â⟩ and ⟨à⟩ respectively. Coastal ⟨éi⟩ and ⟨ei⟩ are Inland ⟨ê⟩ and ⟨è⟩; Coastal ⟨ée⟩ and ⟨ee⟩ are Inland ⟨î⟩ and ⟨ì⟩; and Coastal ⟨óo⟩ and ⟨oo⟩ are Inland ⟨û⟩ and ⟨ù⟩.

== Grammar ==
Tlingit is often described as polysynthetic because a single verb phrase can be the equivalent of a complete English sentence. As such, verb morphology is highly complex, like in other Na-Dene languages. Nouns are clearly distinguished from verbs, unlike in the Salishan languages, which are also part of the Northwest Coast Sprachbund. Other word classes include pronouns, postpositions, relational nouns, and particles. Word order defaults to subject-object-verb, but it is flexible.

=== Nouns ===
Nouns are classified as either possessable or unpossessable, with the possessable nouns being further classified by alienability. Alienable possessed nouns may be possessed by a pronoun, while inalienable nouns must be possessed. In contrast, unpossessable nouns cannot be possessed, and include names for people and places. Nouns may be marked for the plural with the suffix -xʼ, but it is optional.

Possessed nouns take the suffix -ÿi, which has several forms (including -(y)i and -(w)u) depending on the sounds that precede it. Its tone also depends on the stem vowel, so that a low-toned stem vowel will trigger a high tone on the suffix (i.e. yí) while a high-toned stem vowel will do the opposite.

=== Pronouns ===
Pronouns in Tlingit, also known as pronominals, are distinguished in four persons (formally first, second, third, and indefinite), two numbers (singular and plural), and three miscellaneous classes (reflexive, reciprocal, and partitive). They appear as either prefixes on the verb or as independent words. The third person object pronominals are additionally classified through a system of anaphora similar to that in other Na-Dene languages such as Navajo.

=== Postpositions ===
Tlingit uses postpositions to indicate spatial relationships between nouns. They can be suffixed to nouns and nominalized verbs. For example, the perlative suffix -nax̱ is used to mean 'through' or 'via':

Lingít x̱ʼéi-nax̱ waa sá ∅-du-wa-sáa-kw
Tlingit mouth-PROL how Q 3.NEU.OBJ-INDH.SUBJ-PFV-name-REP
'How is it called in Tlingit?' (lit. ' How is it called via the Tlingit mouth?')

Directionals, which also express spatial relationships but are a subcategory of nouns, are differentiated from postpositions. Directionals can also be the object of a postposition.

=== Verbs ===
Verb morphology is highly intricate, with a single verb phrase (called the "verb complex") capable of expressing a full sentence. This verb phrase can communicate, among other things, aspect, mood, tense, transitivity, subject(s) and object(s), and qualities of the object(s).

The nucleus of the verb is the root, which indicates what exactly is being done (e.g., eating, playing, walking, etc.). A verb root cannot appear on its own, so it always also has stem variation, which are differences in vowel length and tone that are dictated by aspect and conjugation. For example, the root *x̱a ('eat') is ungrammatical by itself. Instead, the imperative form of the verb also includes a high tone on the vowel: X̱á! ('Eat [it]!').

Tlingit verbs are commonly analyzed using template morphology, meaning that specific affixes are assigned a position in the verb complex relative to each other. The number of positions varies depending on the analysis given. James Crippen has criticized verb templates in analyses of Tlingit grammar, as they fail to explain interdependencies between morphemes and present a seemingly arbitrary order of affixes, but they are still the most common way for analyzing verbs in all Na-Dene languages. An example of a verb template for Tlingit by Jeff Leer is given below.

Position	Description	Example morpheme(s)
+8	preverbs	g̱unayéi, 'beginning'
+7	number prefixes	has, plural
+6	objects	yee- 'you guys'
+6	incorporated alienable nouns	ḵee- 'day'
+5	incorporated inalienable nouns	x̱ʼe- 'mouth'
+4	schetic prefixes	na-
+3	distributive	dag̱-
+2	subject	x̱- 'I'
+1	classifier	ÿa-
0	ROOT	About 3500 distinct roots
-1	derivational suffixes	-ÿ, telic perfective
-2	durative suffixes	-x̱, habitual
-3	inner mode suffixes	-n
-4	outer mode suffixes	-ín
-5	clause type	-í, subordinate clause

Another criticism of the template is that it implies that all positions can be filled; in reality, this is not true, and even the longest verb phrases do not have every affix slot filled. The example below is a complex verb phrase with many slots filled; the first two words are clitics.

yan yax̱ yi- ya- k- g- wu- x̱- dzi- .ée
TERM EXH 2P.OBJ- QUAL- SRO- SBEN- PFV- 1S.SUBJ- CL- cook
'I finished cooking you (plural, small round) all up for myself'

=== Word order ===
Tlingit is by default an SOV language, but nevertheless word order is quite flexible. The SOV order is most apparent when object and (non-pronominal) agent phrases both exist in the sentence. However, there is a tendency to restrict the arguments of the verb phrase to a single non-pronominal noun phrase, with any other arguments being integrated into the verb. This can cause the appearance of an OSV word order, but it has been shown Tlingit is not an object-initial language.

== Tlingit-language media ==
The Irish TV series An Klondike (2015–2017), set in Canada in the 1890s, contains Tlingit dialogue, as does the American comedy-drama Northern Exposure (1990–1995).

In 2023, the Central Council of the Tlingit & Haida Indian Tribes released the first of nine Tlingit-language children's books and animated videos. Titled Kuhaantí (lit. 'orphan'), it was released on October 27 and has no accompanying English translation, which Lance Twitchell said shows that "our literature can stand on its own."
