= Tsuutʼina language =

Athabaskan language of Alberta

Tsuutʼina
- Sarcee
- Tsúutʼínà Gunáhà
- Native to: Canada
- Region: Alberta
- Ethnicity: Tsuutʼina
- Native speakers: 17 (2021)
- Language family: Na-Dené: Athabaskan–Eyak; Athabaskan; Northern Athabaskan; Tsuutʼina

Language codes
- ISO 639-3: srs
- Glottolog: sars1236
- ELP: Tsuut'ina

- Tsuut'ina is classified as Critically Endangered by the UNESCO Atlas of the World's Languages in Danger.

- People: Tsúùtʼínà
- Language: Tsúùtʼínà Gūnáhà
- Country: Tsúùtʼínà Nìsk’ā; Nitawahsin'nanni (ᖹᒣᖷᑊᓱᐡ ᖻᐡᖹ)

Tsuutʼina (endonym: Tsúùtʼínà Gūnáhà), also known as Sarcee or Sarsi, is an Athabaskan language spoken by the people of the Tsuutʼina Nation, whose reserve and community is near Calgary, Alberta. It is related to other Athabaskan languages, such as Navajo and Chiricahua to the south, and Dene Suline and Tłı̨chǫ to the north.

== Nomenclature ==
The name Tsuutʼina comes from the Tsuutʼina self designation Tsúùtʼínà, which has been translated as "many people" or "nation tribe". It likely derives from tsò-hú-t’ínà "people among the beavers". Sarcee, also spelled Sarsi, is a mostly former exonym (the Sarcee Nation changed its name in 1993 to Tsuu T’ina Nation and later to Tsuut’ina Nation) and is of unclear origin with variants Saahsi in Siksiká and sâsîw in Plains Cree.

== Language revitalization ==
Tsuutʼina is a critically endangered language, with only 150 speakers, 80 of whom speak it as their mother tongue, according to the 2016 Canadian census. The Tsuutʼina Nation has created the Tsuutʼina Gunaha Institute with the intention of creating new fluent speakers. This includes full K–4 immersion education at schools on the Nation and placing stop signs in the Tsuutʼina language at intersections in the Tsuutʼina Nation.

== Phonology ==
=== Consonants ===
The consonants of Tsuutʼina are listed below, with symbols from the standard orthography in brackets:

Consonants
| | | Bilabial | Alveolar | | | Post- alveolar | Velar | | Glottal |
| | | Bilabial | plain | sibilant | lateral | Post- alveolar | plain | rounded | Glottal |
|---|---|---|---|---|---|---|---|---|---|
| Stop | plain | p ⟨b⟩ (Note: /p/ is only found in mimetic buꞏ 'to buzz' and borrowed buꞏs 'cat'.) | t ⟨d⟩ | ts ⟨dz⟩ | tɬ ⟨dl⟩ | tʃ ⟨j⟩ | k ⟨g⟩ | kʷ ⟨gw⟩ (Note: The phonemic status of [kʷ] and [kʷʰ] is questionable; they might be /ku, kʰu/ before another vowel. /kʷʼ/ is quite rare but clearly phonemic.) | ʔ ⟨ʔ⟩ |
| Stop | aspirated | | tʰ ⟨t⟩ | tsʰ ⟨ts⟩ | tɬʰ ⟨tł⟩ | tʃʰ ⟨ch⟩ | kʰ ⟨k⟩ | kʷʰ ⟨kw⟩ | |
| Stop | ejective | | tʼ ⟨tʼ⟩ | tsʼ ⟨tsʼ⟩ | tɬʼ ⟨tłʼ⟩ | tʃʼ ⟨chʼ⟩ | kʼ ⟨kʼ⟩ | kʷʼ ⟨kwʼ⟩ | |
| Fricative | voiceless | | | s ⟨s⟩ | ɬ ⟨ł⟩ | ʃ ⟨sh⟩ | x ⟨x⟩ | | h ⟨h⟩ |
| Fricative | voiced | | | z ⟨z⟩ | | ʒ ⟨zh⟩ | ɣ ⟨gh⟩ | | |
| Nasal | | m ⟨m⟩ | n ⟨n⟩ | | | | | | |
| Approximant | | | | | l ⟨l⟩ | j ⟨y⟩ | | w ⟨w⟩ | |

=== Vowels ===
There are four phonemically distinct vowel qualities in Tsuutʼina: /i a ɒ u/, represented as ⟨i a o u⟩. While /a/ and /ɒ/ are fairly constant, /i u/ can vary considerably.

| | Front | Back |
|---|---|---|
| Close | i ~ e ⟨i⟩ | u ~ o ⟨u⟩ |
| Open | a ⟨a⟩ | ɒ ⟨o⟩ |

Vowels are also distinguished by length and tone, similar to other Athabaskan languages, so that Tsuutʼina, taking the total number of vowel phonemes to 24 (i.e. / ī í ì īː íː ìː ā á à āː áː àː ɒ̄ ɒ́ ɒ̀ ū ú ù ūː úː ùː ɒ̄ː ɒ́ː ɒ̀ː /).

- long vowels are written doubled, e.g., aa [aː]
- high tone is marked with an acute accent, e.g., á
- low tone is marked with a grave accent, e.g., à
- mid tone is marked with a macron, e.g., ā

== Nouns ==
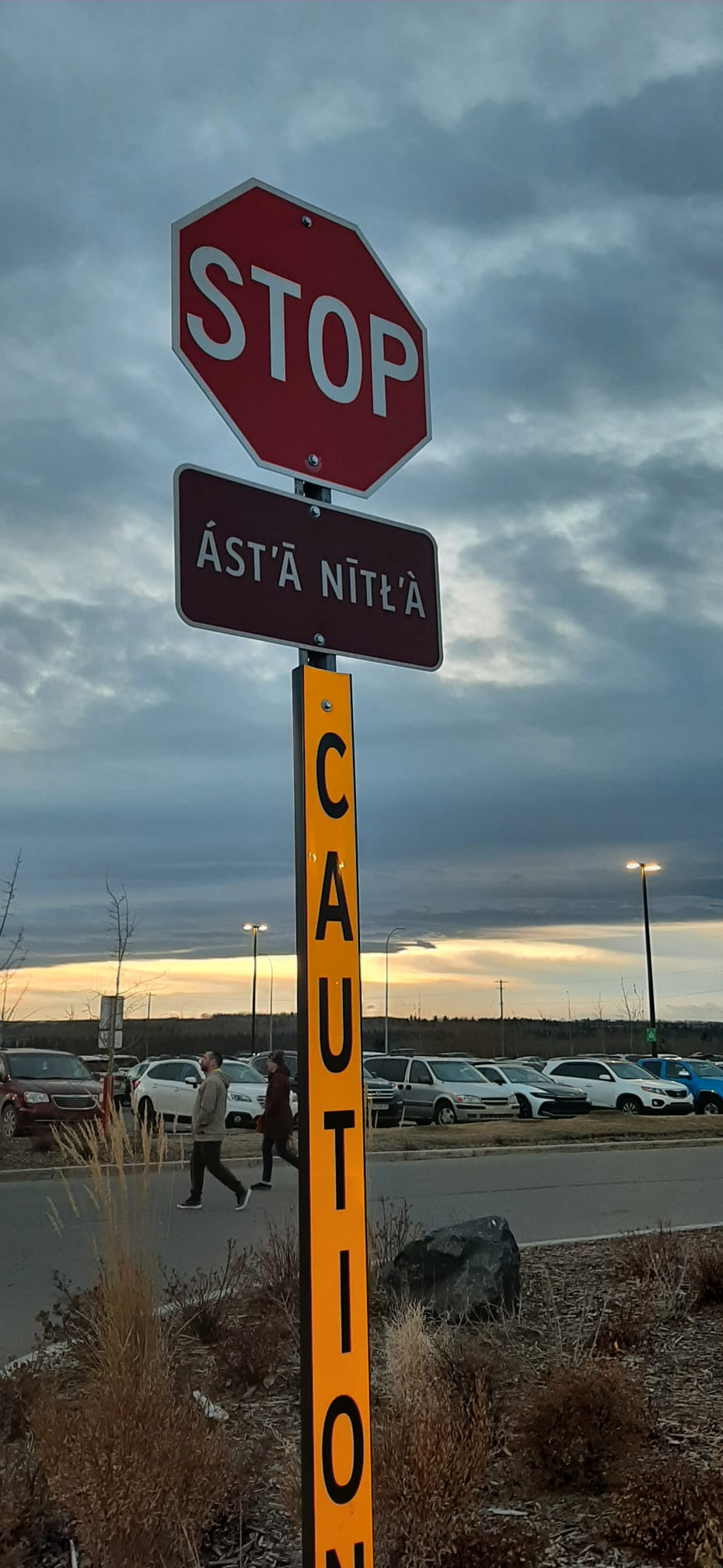
A bilingual stop sign seen at a commercial centre

Nouns in Tsuutʼina are not declined, and most plural nouns are not distinguished from singular nouns. However, kinship terms are distinguished between singular and plural form by adding the suffix -ká (or -kúwá) to the end of the noun or by using the word yìná.

=== List of nouns ===
==== People ====
- husband - kòlà
- man, human - dìná
- wife - tsʼòyá
- woman - tsʼìkā
- grandmother - is’su
- grandfather - is’sa
- mother - in’na
- father - it’ta

==== Nature ====
- Buffalo, cow - xāní
- Cloud - nàkʼús
- Dog - tłí(chʼà)
- Fire - kù
- Mud, dirt - gútłʼìs
- Snow - zòs
- Water - tú

==== Words and phrases ====
- my name is (..) - sizi

=== Noun possession ===
Nouns can exist in free form or possessed form. When in possessed form, the prefixes listed below can be attached to nouns to show possession. For example, más, "knife", can be affixed with the 1st person prefix to become sìmázàʼ or "my knife". Note that -mázàʼ is the possessed form of the noun.

Some nouns, like más, as shown above, can alternate between free form and possessed form. A few nouns, like zòs, "snow", are never possessed and exist only in free form. Other nouns, such as -tsìʼ, "head", have no free form and must always be possessed.

==== Typical possession prefixes ====
- 1st person - si-
- 2nd person - ni-
- 3rd person - mi-
- 4th person (Athabaskan) - ɣi-

== Bibliography ==
- Cook, Eung-Do (1971a). "Vowels and Tone in Sarcee". Language. 47: 164–179.
- Cook, Eung-Do (1971b). "Morphophonemics of Two Sarcee Classifiers". International Journal of American Linguistics. 37: 152–155.
- Cook, Eung-Do (1971d). "Sarcee Numerals". Anthropological Linguistics. 13: 435–441.
- Cook, Eung-Do (1972). Sarcee Verb Paradigms. Mercury Series Paper No. 2. Ottawa: National Museum of Man.
- Cook, Eung-Do. (1973b). "Complementation in Sarcee". [Unpublished?]
- Cook, Eung-Do (1978b). "The Synchronic and Diachronic Status of Sarcee ɣy". International Journal of American Linguistics. 43: 259–268.
- Cook, Eung-Do (1978c). "Palatalizations and Related Rules in Sarcee". In Cook, Eung-Do; Kaye, Jonathan (eds.). Linguistics Studies of Native Canada. Vancouver: University of British Columbia Press. pp. 19–36.
- Cook, Eung-Do (1978d). "The Verb 'BE' in Sarcee". Amerindia. 3: 105–113.
- Cook, Eung-Do (1984). A Sarcee Grammar. Vancouver: University of British Columbia Press. ISBN 0-7748-0200-6.
- Goddard, P. E. (1915). "Sarcee Texts". University of California Publications in American Archaeology and Ethnology. 11: 189–277.
- Honigmann, J. (1956). "Notes on Sarsi Kin Behavior". Anthropologica. 11: 17–38.
- Hofer, E. (1973). "Phonological Change in Sarcee". [Unpublished?]
- Hofer, E. (1974). Topics in Sarcee Syntax (M.A. thesis). The University of Calgary.
- Hoijer, H. and Joël, J.. (1963). "Sarcee Nouns", in Studies in the Athabaskan Languages, eds. Hoijer, H. et al., 62–75.
- Hoiger, H.; Joël, J. (1963). "Sarcee Nouns". In Hoijer, H.; et al. (eds.). Studies in the Athabaskan Languages. pp. 62–75.
- Li, Fang-Kuei. "A Study of Sarcee Verb Stems". International Journal of American Linguistics. 6: 3–27.
- Sapir, E. (1924). "Personal Names Among the Sarcee Indians", American Anthropologist n.s. 26, 108–199.
- Sapir, Edward (1924). "Personal Names Among the Sarcee Indians". American Anthropologist. 26 (1): 108–199. JSTOR 660696.
- Sapir, E. (1925). "Pitch Accent in Sarcee, An Athabaskan language". Journal de la Société des Américanistes de Paris. 17: 185–205. JSTOR 44386765.
- Sarcee Culture Program. 1979. Tsu Tʼina and the Buffalo. Calgary.

== See also ==
- Tsuutʼina Nation
