= Michael E. Krauss =

American linguist (1934–2019)

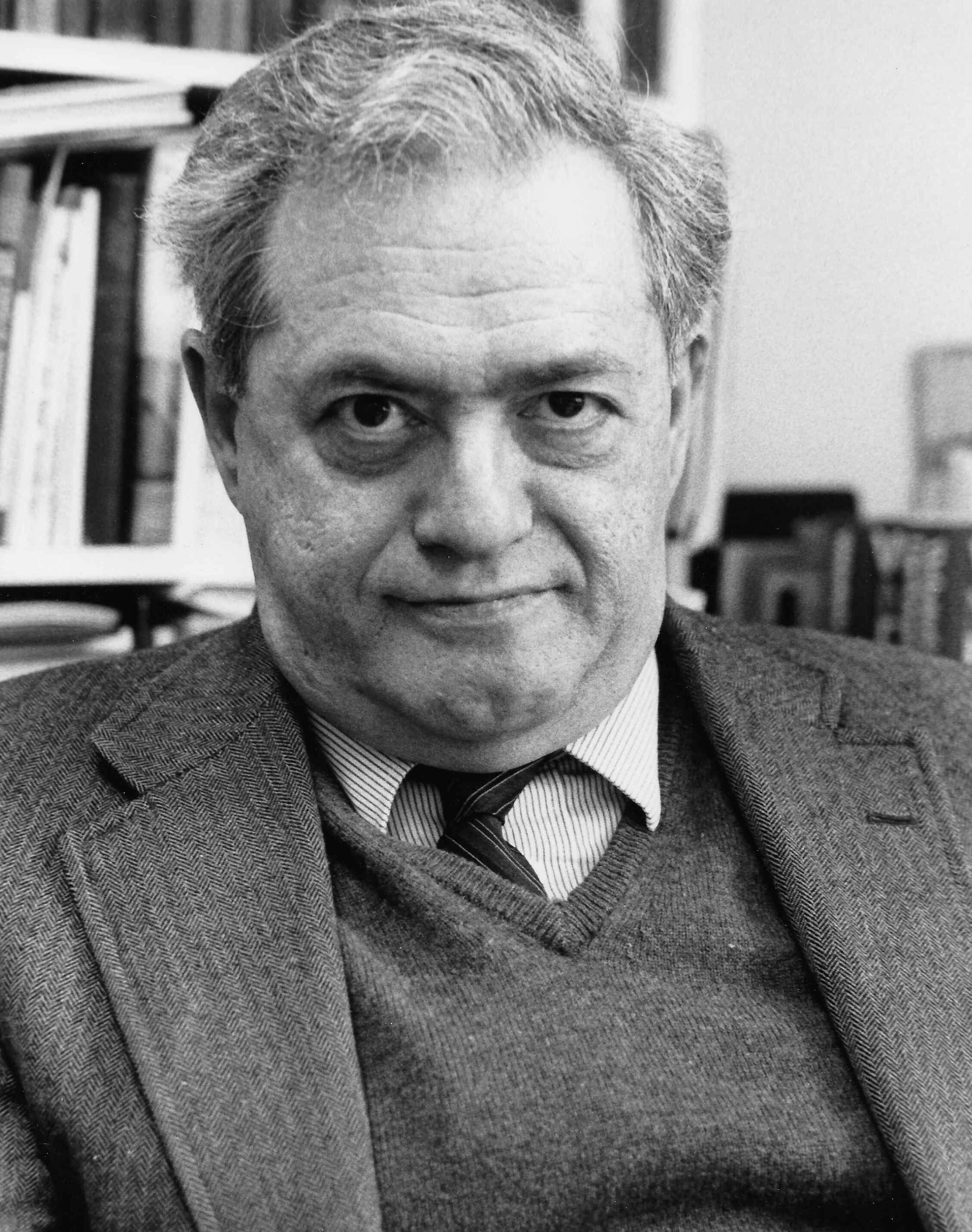
- Born: August 15, 1934; Cleveland, Ohio, U.S.
- Died: August 11, 2019 (aged 84); Needham, Massachusetts, U.S.
- Scientific career
- Fields: Linguistics

Michael E. Krauss (August 15, 1934 – August 11, 2019) was an American linguist, professor emeritus, founder and long-time head of the Alaska Native Language Center. The Alaska Native Language Archive is named after him.

Krauss is known first and foremost as an Athabaskanist and Eyak language specialist, a language that became extinct in January 2008. However, he worked on all of the 20 Native languages of Alaska, 18 of which belong to the Na-Dené and Eskimo–Aleut language families.

Throughout his career, and most notably with his 1991 address to the Linguistic Society of America, Krauss focused awareness of the global problem of endangered languages. He worked to encourage the documentation and revitalization of endangered languages across the world.

Krauss joined the faculty of the University of Alaska Fairbanks in 1960 and served as director of the Alaska Native Language Center from its inception in 1972 until his retirement in June 2000. He remained active in efforts to document Alaska's Native languages and encouraged awareness of the global problem of endangered languages.

== Education ==
Krauss received a B.A. from the University of Chicago (1953); M.A. from Columbia University, (1955); Certificat d'Etudes supérieures from the University of Paris (1956); and Ph.D. in Linguistics and Celtic from Harvard University (1959). His dissertation was titled "Studies in Irish Gaelic Phonology & Orthography."

== Irish ==
Krauss conducted fieldwork with Irish in Western Ireland (1956–1958).

== Nordic ==
Krauss conducted fieldwork with Nordic languages in Iceland and in the Faroe Islands (1958–1960).

== Athabaskan comparative linguistics ==
After completing a dissertation on Gaelic languages Krauss arrived in Alaska in 1960 to teach French at the University of Alaska. But Krauss was clearly aware of and interested in the indigenous languages of Alaska prior to his arrival. In fact, while en route to Alaska he visited Harry Hoijer, the leading scholar of Athabaskan languages at the time. Arriving in Alaska he became immediately aware of the dire situation of the indigenous languages of Alaska and quickly turned his attention to documenting those languages, focusing initially on the (Lower) Tanana language. This turned out to be quite fortuitous for scholars of Athabaskan comparative linguistics, as Lower Tanana nicely demonstrated a split in the Proto-Athabaskan *ts- series which was not evidenced in Hoijer's data. Although Krauss immediately communicated this new information to Hoijer, it was not incorporated into Hoijer's major Athabaskan monograph, printed in 1963. The Minto data did appear in a series of IJAL articles by Krauss in the mid to late 1960s, but it was some time before the existence of an additional Proto-Athabaskan affricate series became widely known.

== Eyak ==
Krauss' largest contribution to language documentation was his work on Eyak, which began in 1961. Eyak was then already the most endangered of the Alaskan languages, and Krauss' work might be considered salvage linguistics today. While some Eyak data had been previously available, they were overlooked by previous scholars, including Edward Sapir. However, Eyak proved to be a crucial missing link for historical linguistics, being equally closely related to neighboring Ahtna and to distant Navajo. With good Eyak data it became possible to establish the existence of the Athabaskan–Eyak–Tlingit language family, though phonological evidence for links to Haida remained elusive. Further, the system of vowel modifications present in Eyak inspired Krauss' theory of Athabaskan tonogenesis, whereby tone develops from vowel constriction.

== Endangered languages ==
Michael Krauss' lecture at the Linguistic Society of America conference in January 1991 is often cited as a turning point which refocused the field of linguistics on documentation and inspired a systematic global effort to document the world's linguistic diversity. In his lecture, titled "The world's languages in crisis," Dr. Krauss famously warned:

"Obviously we must do some serious rethinking of our priorities, lest linguistics go down in history as the only science that presided obliviously over the disappearance of 90% of the very field to which it is dedicated."

Michael Krauss contends that in the United States, children are only learning 20% of the world's remaining languages.

== Selected bibliography ==
=== Monographs ===
- Krauss, Michael E. (n.d.). Na-Dene. College, AK: University of Alaska and M.I.T.
- Krauss, Michael E. (1969). On the classification in the Athapascan, Eyak, and the Tlingit verb. Baltimore: Waverly Press, Indiana University.
- Krauss, Michael E. (1970). Eyak dictionary. College, AK: University of Alaska.
- Krauss, Michael E. (1970). Eyak texts. College, AK: University of Alaska and Massachusetts Institute of Technology.
- Krauss, Michael E. (1970). Eskimo–Aleut. The Hague: Mouton.
- Krauss, Michael E. (1974). Native peoples and language of Alaska. Fairbanks, AK: Alaska Native Language Center, Center for Northern Educational Research, University of Alaska.
- Krauss, Michael E. (1980). Alaska Native languages: Past, present, and future. Fairbanks, AK: Alaska Native Language Center. ISBN 9780933769342
- Krauss, Michael E. (1980). On the history and use comparative Athapaskan linguistics. Fairbanks, AK: University of Alaska, Native Language Center.
- Krauss, Michael E. (1985). Yupik Eskimo prosodic systems: Descriptive and comparative studies. Fairbanks, AK: Alaska Native Language Center. ISBN 9780933769373

=== Articles ===
- Hale, Ken; Krauss, Michael; Watahomigie, Lucille J.; Yamamoto, Akira Y.; Craig, Colette; Jeanne, LaVerne M.; England, Nora C; et al. (1992). "Endangered languages". Language. 68 (1): 1–42. doi:10.2307/416368. JSTOR 416368.
- Krauss, Michael E. (1964). "The proto-Athapaskan–Eyak and the problem of Na-Dene, I: The phonology". International Journal of American Linguistics. 30 (2): 118–131. doi:10.1086/464766. S2CID 144615266.
- Krauss, Michael E. (1965). "The proto-Athapaskan–Eyak and the problem of Na-Dene, II: The morphology". International Journal of American Linguistics. 31 (1): 18–28. doi:10.1086/464810. S2CID 144404147.
- Krauss, Michael E. (1968). "Noun classifiers in the Athapaskan, Eyak, Tlingit, and Haida verb". International Journal of American Linguistics. 34 (3): 194–203. doi:10.1086/465014. S2CID 143582680.
- Krauss, Michael E. (1973). Na-Dene. In T. A. Sebeok (Ed.), Linguistics in North America (pp. 903–978). The Hague: Mouton. (Reprinted as Krauss 1976).
- Krauss, Michael E. (1975). "St. Lawrence Island Eskimo phonology and orthography". Linguistics 13 [=152] : 39-72.
- Krauss, Michael E. (1976). Na-Dene. In T. A. Sebeok (Ed.), Native languages of the America (pp. 283–358). New York: Plenum. (Reprint of Krauss 1973).
- Krauss, Michael E. (1979). Na-Dene and Eskimo. In L. Campbell & M. Mithun (Eds.), The languages of native America: Historical and comparative assessment. Austin: University of Texas Press.
- Krauss, Michael E. (1986). Edward Sapir and Athabaskan linguistics. In W. Cowan, M. Foster, & K. Koerner (Eds.), New perspectives in language, culture, and personality (pp. 147–190). Amsterdam: Benjamins.
- Krauss, Michael E. (1992). The World's Languages in Crisis. Language 68(1).4-10.
- Krauss, Michael E. (2005). Athabaskan Tone. In: Keren Rice and Sharon Hargus, eds, Athabaskan Prosody, ed. by Keren Rice & Sharon Hargus. Amsterdam: John Benjamins. ISBN 90-272-4783-8

=== Collaborations ===
- Badten, Adelinda W.; Krauss, Michael E.; & Rubtsova, Ekaterina S. (1971). Ungazighmiit ungipaghaatangit. College: University of Alaska.
- Friedrich, Paul; & Krauss, Michael E. (1969). On the meaning of the Tarascan suffixes of space. Baltimore, Waverly Press.
- Gudgel-Holmes, Dianne; Joseph, Abbie; Jones, Eliza; Kari, James M.; & Krauss, Michael E. (1991). Native place names of the Kantishna drainage. Anchorage, AK: U.S. Department of the Interior, National Park Service, Alaska Regional Office.
- Harry, Anna N.; & Krauss, Michael E. (1982). In honor of Eyak: The art of Anna Nelson Harry. Fairbanks, AK: Alaska Native Language Center, University of Alaska.
- Krauss, Michael E.; & Leer, Jeff. (1981). Athabaskan, Eyak, and Tlingit sonorants. Alaska Native Language Center research papers (No. 5). Fairbanks, AK: University of Alaska, Alaska Native Language Center.
- Krauss, Michael E.; & McGary, Mary J. (1980). Alaska native languages: A bibliographical catalogue. Fairbanks, AK: Alaska Native Language Center.

=== Maps ===
- Krauss, Michael E. (1975). Native peoples and languages of Alaska. [Map]. Fairbanks, AK: Alaska Native Language Center, University of Alaska. 2nd edition 1982.
- Krauss, Michael E. (1995). Inuit, Nunait, Nunangit, Yuget, Unangan Tanangin. [Map]. Fairbanks, AK: Alaska Native Language Center, University of Alaska Fairbanks.
