= Keren Rice =

Canadian linguist (born 1949)

Keren D. Rice
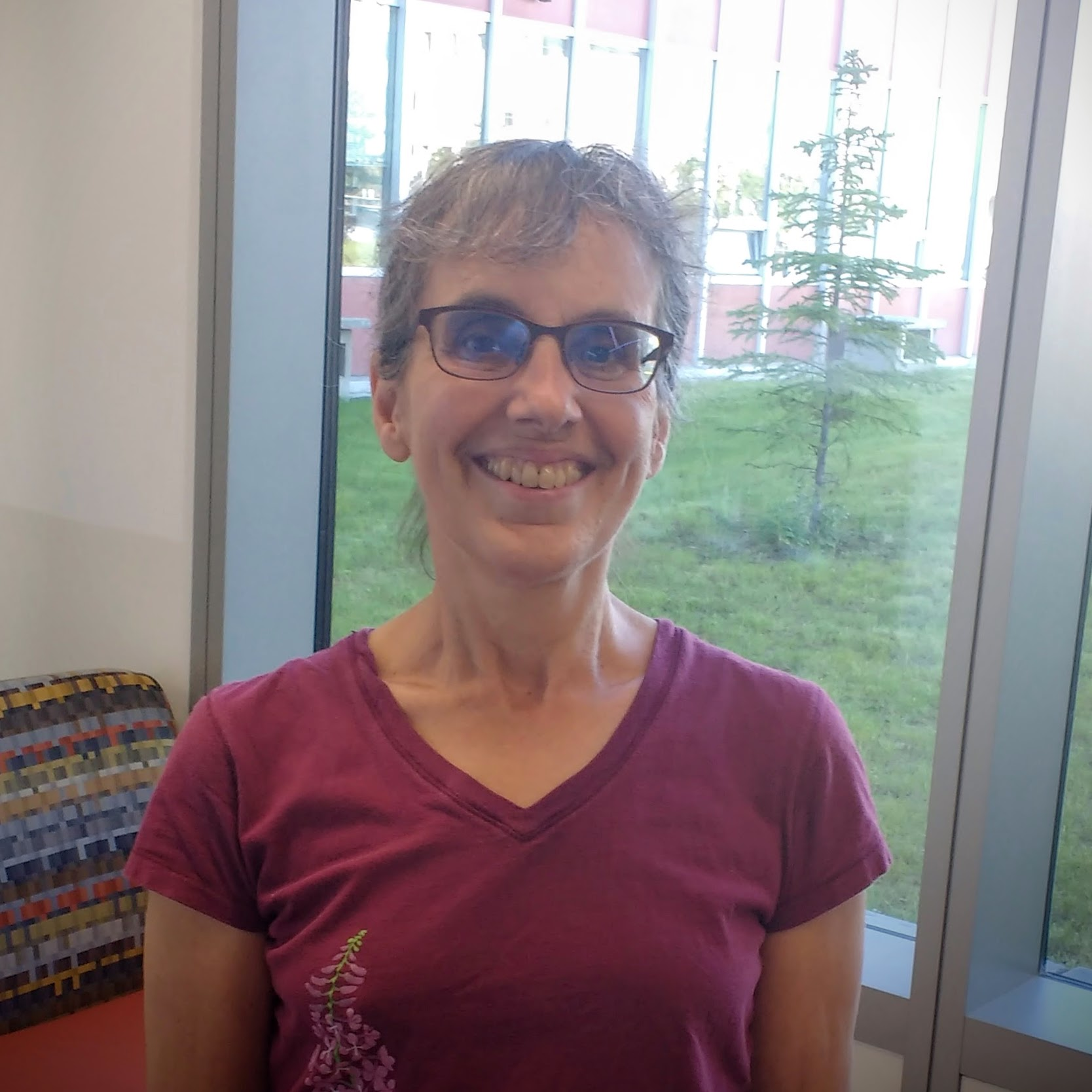
- Born: 1949 (age 76–77)
- Awards: Order of Canada
- Scientific career
- Fields: Linguistics
- Institutions: University of Toronto

Keren D. Rice OC (born 1949) is a Canadian linguist. She is a professor of linguistics and serves as the director of the Centre for Aboriginal Initiatives at the University of Toronto.

== Education and career ==
Rice earned her PhD in 1976 from the University of Toronto, with a dissertation entitled, "Hare phonology."

She has published numerous works in both theoretical and Native American linguistics, in particular on Athabaskan languages. She specializes in research on Slavey, an indigenous language spoken in Canada's Northwest Territories, and has long been involved in maintaining and revitalizing the language. She has made contributions to the study of phonological markedness (Rice 2007) and to the interaction of phonology, morphology and semantics (Rice 2000).

== Awards and distinctions ==
- Rice was elected as a fellow of the American Association for the Advancement of Science in 2005. She was elected as a fellow of the Linguistic Society of America in 2009.
- Rice was elected as a member of the American Philosophical Society in 2014.
- From 2002 to 2008 she served on the board of the Social Sciences and Humanities Research Council (SSHRC), a granting agency of the federal government of Canada.
- In 2011 she received the Killam Prize, given annually to five of Canada's finest academics for their career achievements in fields of scientific and scholastic research.
- In 2013 she won the National Achievement Award from the Canadian Linguistic Association for outstanding contributions to the field of linguistics.
- In 2013 she was appointed by the Governor General of Canada as an Officer in the Order of Canada, which is one of Canada's highest civilian honors.
- In 2015 she was elected as a Fellow in the American Academy of Arts and Sciences.
- In 2015 Rice received the Pierre Chauveau medal of the Royal Society of Canada, awarded for her continued contributions as a scholar, including her extensive work in language documentation, activism, and theoretical linguistics.
- Rice served as president of the Canadian Linguistic Association from 1998 to 2002
- Rice served as the president of the Linguistic Society of America (LSA) in 2012.
- Rice served as the president of the Association for Linguistic Typology (ALT) from 2020 until 2022.

== Publications ==
Rice, K. 1977. Hare Noun Dictionary. Ottawa: Northern Social Research Division, Department of Indian and Northern Affairs.

E. Cook and K. Rice (eds.) 1989. Athapaskan Linguistics: Current Perspectives on a Language Family. Berlin: Mouton de Gruyter. ISBN 978-3-11-011166-8

Rice, K. 1989. A Grammar of Slave. Berlin: Mouton de Gruyter. ISBN 978-3-11-010779-1

Rice, K. 1992. "On deriving sonority: a structural account of sonority relationships." Phonology 9: 61—99.

Rice, K. 1993. "A reexamination of the feature [sonorant]: the status of 'sonorant obstruents'." Language 69: 308–344.

Rice, K. 1996. Default variability: The coronal-velar relationship. Natural Language and Linguistic Theory 14, 493–543. https://doi.org/10.1007/BF00133597

Rice, K. 2000. Morpheme Order and Semantic Scope: Word Formation in the Athapaskan Verb. Cambridge: Cambridge University Press.

Rice, K. 2006. Ethical Issues In Linguistic Fieldwork: An Overview. Journal of Academic Ethics 4, 123–155. https://doi.org/10.1007/s10805-006-9016-2

Rice, K. 2007. Markedness in phonology. In P. Lacy (Ed.), The Cambridge Handbook of Phonology (Cambridge Handbooks in Language and Linguistics, pp. 79–98). Cambridge: Cambridge University Press. doi:10.1017/CBO9780511486371.005

Rice, K. & L. Saxon. 2008. Comparative Athapaskan Syntax: Arguments and Projections. In: The Oxford Handbook of Comparative Syntax, Edited by Guglielmo Cinque and Richard S. Kayne. doi:10.1093/oxfordhb/9780195136517.013.0016
