= List of sound archives =

This is a list of sound archives.

A sound archive(s) is a specialized archive that is often maintained by a nation, state, university, non-profit organization, or corporation. This article contains a list of sound archives.

== A ==
- Acoustic Atlas
- American Philosophical Society Library
- American Radio Archive
- Archive of the Indigenous Languages of Latin America
- Archives of Traditional Music, Indiana University
- Australian Queer Archives
- Australian Screen Online
- Austrian State Archives

== B ==
- BBC Sound Archive
- British Library Sound Archive

== C ==
- Canadian Broadcasting Corporation Radio Archives

== E ==
- Earth.fm
- EMI Archive Trust
- Endangered Languages Archive (ELAR)

== F ==
- The Full English (folk music archive)
- Freesound.org

== G ==
- German Broadcasting Archive
- The Great 78 Project

== I ==
- Institut national de l'audiovisuel
- International Association of Sound and Audiovisual Archives
- International Dialects of English Archive
- Internet Archive

== K ==
- Kaipuleohone

== L ==
- Library of Congress
- Live Music Archive

== M ==
- Macaulay Library - Cornell Lab Ornithology Sound Archive
- Marr Sound Archives
- Music Library and Bill Schurk Sound Archives

== N ==
- National Audiovisual Institute (Finland)
- National Film and Sound Archive
- National Library of Australia
- National Recording Preservation Board
- New American Radio
- New York Public Library for the Performing Arts
- North West Sound Archive
- NPR

== O ==
- Österreichische Mediathek

== P ==
- Pacifica Radio Archives
- Pangloss Collection
- Paradisec
- Poetry Archive
- Provincial Archives of Alberta

== R ==
- Ralph Rinzler Folklife Archives and Collections
- Radio Atlas
- Radio Papesse
- Rigler-Deutsch Index

== S ==
- Sample library
- Scotsoun
- Sounddogs
- SoundStorm (company)
- Studs Terkel Radio Archive

== T ==
- Third Coast International Audio Festival Library

== U ==
- Uysal–Walker Archive of Turkish Oral Narrative
- UbuWeb - avant-garde digital archive

== W ==
- Wave Farm
- WNYC

== Y ==
- 92nd Street Y

== See also ==
- Sound archive
- List of music archivists
- List of film archives
- List of archives
