= Colleen Fitzgerald =

American linguist

- Occupation: American linguist

Academic background
- Education: University of Arizona

Academic work
- Institutions: North Dakota State University
- Main interests: Phonology, Language documentation, Language revitalization

Colleen M. Fitzgerald is an American linguist who specializes in phonology, as well as language documentation and revitalization, especially with Native American languages.

== Career and research ==
She earned her doctorate in linguistics in 1997 at the University of Arizona. Her dissertation focused on prosody in Tohono O'odham, an Uto-Aztecan language. She has published on Tohono O'odham, as well as other languages. Her other publications are on the topic of service learning in linguistics, including in indigenous language revitalization courses.

Fitzgerald is the Vice President for Research and Creative Activity at North Dakota State University. Previously she was Associate Vice President for research at Texas A&M University–Corpus Christi, and Professor in the Department of Linguistics and TESOL the University of Texas at Arlington where she directed the Native American Languages Lab. She formerly served as chair of the department.

Fitzgerald served as Director of the 2014 Institute on Collaborative Research, or CoLang 2014. This was the fourth iteration of this international training workshop in language documentation and revitalization. With linguist Mary Linn, she co-directed the 2012 and 2014 Oklahoma Breath of Life Workshops.

== Honors and distinctions ==
In 2021, Fitzgerald was inducted both as a Fellow of the American Association for the Advancement of Science and as Fellow of the Linguistic Society of America. In 2017 she was an invited plenary speaker at the Linguistic Society of America annual meeting, talking on, "The Sounds of Indigenous Language Revitalization."

From 2015 to 2019 Fitzgerald served as the program director for the Documenting Endangered Languages program at the National Science Foundation.

== Selected publications ==
- Fitzgerald, Colleen. 1997. O'odham Rhythms. Ph.D. dissertation, University of Arizona.
- Fitzgerald, Colleen. 1998. The Meter of Tohono O'odham Songs. International Journal of American Linguistics 64: 1-36.
- Fitzgerald, Colleen. 1999. Loanwords and Stress in Tohono O'odham. Anthropological Linguistics 41: 1-33.
- Fitzgerald, Colleen. 2000. Vowel Hiatus and Faithfulness in Tohono O'odham Reduplication. Linguistic Inquiry 31: 713-722.
- Fitzgerald, Colleen. 2002. Tohono O'odham Stress in a Single Ranking. Phonology 19:253-271.
- Fitzgerald, Colleen. 2010. Developing a Service-Learning Curriculum for Linguistics. Language and Linguistics Compass 4:4, 204-218.
- Fitzgerald, Colleen M. & Joshua D. Hinson. 2013. 'Ilittibatoksali 'We work together': Perspectives on Our Chickasaw Tribal-Academic Collaboration, in Norris, Mary Jane, Erik Anonby, Marie-Odile Junker, Nicholas Ostler & Donna Patrick (eds.), FEL Proceedings XVII (Ottawa, 2013) FEL XVII: Endangered Languages Beyond Boundaries: Community Connections, Collaborative Approaches, and Cross-Disciplinary Research. 53-60. Bath, England: The Foundation for Endangered Languages.
- Fitzgerald, Colleen M. & Mary S. Linn. 2013. Training Communities, Training Graduate Students: The 2012 Oklahoma Breath of Life Workshop. Language Documentation and Conservation 7: 185-206.
