= Nicholas Thieberger =

Australian linguist

Nick Thieberger FAHA is an Australian linguist and an associate professor in the School of Languages and Linguistics at the University of Melbourne.

== Education ==
Thieberger graduated from La Trobe University with a BA Hons. His Masters was also at La Trobe, then he moved to the University of Melbourne to complete his PhD in 2004 for his work on the grammar of South Efate (Nafsan), which was the first grammar to demonstrate the use of a media corpus as the basis for examples used in the grammar.

== Career ==
Thieberger helped to establish the PARADISEC archive in 2003 and currently serves as its director. He was the Editor of Language Documentation & Conservation (2011–2021), an academic journal which focuses on language documentation and conservation. He was elected a Fellow of the Australian Academy of the Humanities in 2021.

Thieberger has acted as an expert linguistic witness in Native Title claims, notably the Single Noongar Claim and the Ngarluma/Yindjibarndi Claim.

He is best known for his work with speakers of Indigenous Australian languages, for his work on the South Efate (Nafsan) language of Vanuatu, and for his work in language documentation methodology. He established Wangka Maya, the Pilbara Aboriginal Language Centre in the late 1980s, ASEDA, the Aboriginal Studies Electronic Data Archive, in the early 1990s, and co-founded the Resource Network for Linguistic Diversity. He established Kaipuleohone, the University of Hawai'i's digital language archive. He became President of the Digital Endangered Languages and Musics Archives Network in 2025. From 2022-2025 he led the development of Nyingarn, a platform for transcription of early manuscript records of Indigenous languages.

In 2026 Thieberger received the Marles medal for research excellence from the University of Melbourne, "for developing the Pacific and Regional Archive for Digital Sources in Endangered Cultures (PARADISEC), which is helping to preserve endangered language, ethnographic and cultural collections".

== Key publications ==
[Many of these references are available here]

- Thieberger, Nick, Amanda Harris, Sally Treloyn and Myfany Turpin (eds). 2024. Keeping Time: Dialogues on Music and Archives in Honour of Linda Barwick. Sydney: SUP
- Barwick, Linda & Nicholas Thieberger. (eds.) 2006. Sustainable Data from Digital Fieldwork Sydney: Sydney University Press.
- McConvell, Patrick & Nicholas Thieberger. 2001. State of Indigenous languages in Australia - 2001. Australia State of the Environment Second Technical Paper Series (Natural and Cultural Heritage), Department of the Environment and Heritage, Canberra.
- Sharp, Janet & Nicholas Thieberger. 1992. Bilybara: Aboriginal languages of the Pilbara Region Port Hedland: Wangka Maya.
- Thieberger, Nicholas. 1993. Handbook of WA Aboriginal Languages south of the Kimberley Region Canberra: Pacific Linguistics.
- Thieberger, Nicholas. 2006. A Grammar of South Efate: An Oceanic Language of Vanuatu Oceanic Linguistics Special Publication, No. 33. Honolulu: University of Hawai'i Press.
- Thieberger, Nicholas (ed). 2012. The Oxford Handbook of Linguistic Fieldwork. Oxford: OUP.
- Thieberger, Nicholas & Bill McGregor (eds.).1994. Macquarie Aboriginal words: a dictionary of words of Australian Aboriginal and Torres Strait Islander languages Sydney: Macquarie Library.
