= Margaret Florey =

Australian linguist

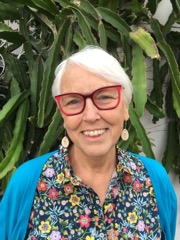
- Education: University of Hawaii
- Scientific career
- Fields: Linguistics

Margaret Florey is an Australian linguist whose work focuses on the revitalization and maintenance of Indigenous Australian languages. She has documented changes in contemporary speech, such as the expression Yeah, no which is becoming more prevalent in Australia.

Florey received her PhD in 1990 from the University of Hawaii. Her linguistic fieldwork experience focuses on endangered Austronesian languages of Central Maluku, eastern Indonesia, and Australian languages of the Pilbara region of Western Australia. She is a co-founder of the Resource Network for Linguistic Diversity and is the creator of the Documenting and Revitalising Indigenous Languages Training Program, which has reached over 50 Australian communities. She contributed to international training workshops, including InField: Institute on Field Linguistics and Language Documentation (2008, 2010), CoLang: Institute on Collaborative Language Research (2014, 2016, 2018), and the Canadian Indigenous Languages and Literacy Institute (2009, 2010). She was the founding co-director (2009-2012) of the Consortium for Training in Language Documentation and Conservation and has served on its steering committee since 2012. She is a past chair of the International Conference on Austronesian Linguistics steering committee, the Pacific region delegate for Linguapax, Barcelona, and served on the Board of Governors of Terralingua.

== Key publications ==
- (2018) Florey, M. 'Transforming the landscape of language revitalization work in Australia: The Documenting and Revitalising Indigenous Languages training model'. In Bischoff, S. T. & C. Jany (Eds.) Insights from Practices in Community-Based Research: From Theory To Practice Around The Globe, 314-338. Berlin, Boston: De Gruyter Mouton.
- (2010) Florey, M. (ed.). Endangered Languages of Austronesia. Oxford: Oxford University Press.
- (2007) Florey, M. and V. Rau. (eds) Documenting and revitalising Austronesian languages. Honolulu: University of Hawai'i Press.
- (2005) McConvell, P. and M. Florey (eds). Language shift, code-mixing and variation. (Special volume of) Australian Journal of Linguistics 25 (1).
- (2008) 'Language activism and the "new linguistics": Expanding opportunities for documenting endangered languages in Indonesia.' In P.K. Austin (ed.) Language Documentation and Description, Vol. 5, 120-135. London: SOAS.
- (1990) Language shift: Changing patterns of language allegiance in western Seram. Unpublished PhD thesis, Honolulu: The University of Hawaii.
