= Poetry Archive =

Online library of poetry recordings

The Poetry Archive
- Type: Charitable trust
- Purpose: Modern poetry in English read by the author
- Official language: English
- Founders: Andrew Motion and Richard Carrington
- President: Daniel Day-Lewis (current) Seamus Heaney (2005-2013)
- Director: Tracey Guiry
- Main organ: Board of trustees
- Website: Poetry Archive

The Poetry Archive is a free, web-based library formed to hold recordings of English language poets reading their own work. The Archive holds over 20,000 poems and keeps the recordings safe and accessible so that current and future visitors can enjoy them. Each poet's work is surrounded by contextual information and biographies and has become a treasured resource for anyone looking for poetry.

The Poetry Archive was founded by recording producer Richard Carrington and poet Andrew Motion, during his appointment as UK Poet Laureate in 1999 and is now led by Director Tracey Guiry. Recordings of contemporary work began in 2000 and the first website went live in 2005. The Poetry Archive is a not-for-profit registered UK charity.

== Formation and development ==
The archive was established as a web-based library to ensure that the oral record of modern poets is not lost, as it has been with writers such as Thomas Hardy, D. H. Lawrence and A. E. Housman whose voices were never recorded, despite the technology being available at the time. The resource is built on the idea that poets have a unique relationship with their own work and are often able to communicate the nuance, musicality and subtlety of it, with a deeper understanding than actors. Texts to the poems and other resources are available but the poet's voice is the main concern of the site. Motion has stated "To hear the speed at which a poet reads, to hear their accent, to hear how they inflect their voice, to hear how they create a space around their words - or don't - all add to our using of what the meaning of poem might be." Contemporary studio recordings for the project began in 2000, shortly after Motion was appointed a Poet Laureate, and the site went live in 2005. Most of the recordings are created especially for the Archive and these are augmented by some classic poems read by well-known readers. New recordings are regularly added and there is also a download store which allows people to purchase and download audio poetry directly from the website.

In the first year, the site had 500,000 visitors, building to over 1.5 million annual users in 2008, nearly 2 million in 2009 and over 3 million in its 20th year of recording. The project continues to be funded by the National Lottery, government grants and private donors.

The current president is Sir Daniel Day-Lewis. The previous president was the late poet Seamus Heaney

== Content ==
In May 2019 the Children's Poetry Archive site launched a website designed for children to explore and enjoy As of July 2020, the readings of over 550 poets are available on the two sites, with content searchable by title, author, theme, and form. Historic recordings available on the archive include Alfred Tennyson (recorded by Thomas Edison 1890), Robert Browning (1889), Rudyard Kipling (1921) W. B. Yeats (1932) and Langston Hughes (1955). Contemporary writers include Seamus Heaney, Billy Collins, Carol Ann Duffy and John Ashbery.

The work of New Zealand Allen Curnow was recorded shortly before his death in 2001, one of the first to be archived. Cornish poet Charles Causley gave a reading aged 86, in the year before he died in 2003. Motion commented:

It's a fantastically powerful recording that was done a matter of days before his death. It doesn't show on the recording, but Richard, who made the recording, said that between each poem Charles broke down and wept, and had to gather himself. He knew that he was dying. He was saying goodbye to each of his poems. If you only listen to one of the poems on the website, listen to "Eden Rock". It's a great poem and he reads it so beautifully and introduces it so touchingly.

In 2006 historic readings by Dylan Thomas, Ted Hughes and Walter de la Mare, were added. That same year, the project worked with the BBC to archive rare readings by Siegfried Sassoon, Robert Graves and Philip Larkin. In 2008 over 60 American recordings were archived on the site, in collaboration with the Poetry Foundation, based in Chicago. Readers include Ted Kooser, Robert Pinsky, and Philip Levine. The Children's ARchive also includes work by poets such as Roald Dahl, Spike Milligan, Michael Rosen. The website also features collections of classic poetry being read by contemporary poets and famous British voices, including Helen Mirren, Stephen Fry, Judi Dench and Alan Rickman.

The archive also includes extensive material for teachers and students, including glossaries, biographies and lesson plans that integrated as a school resource.

== See also ==
- British Library Sound Archive
- BBC Sound Archive
- Poetry Library
- List of sound archives
