= Andrea L. Berez-Kroeker =

American linguist

Andrea Berez-Kroeker
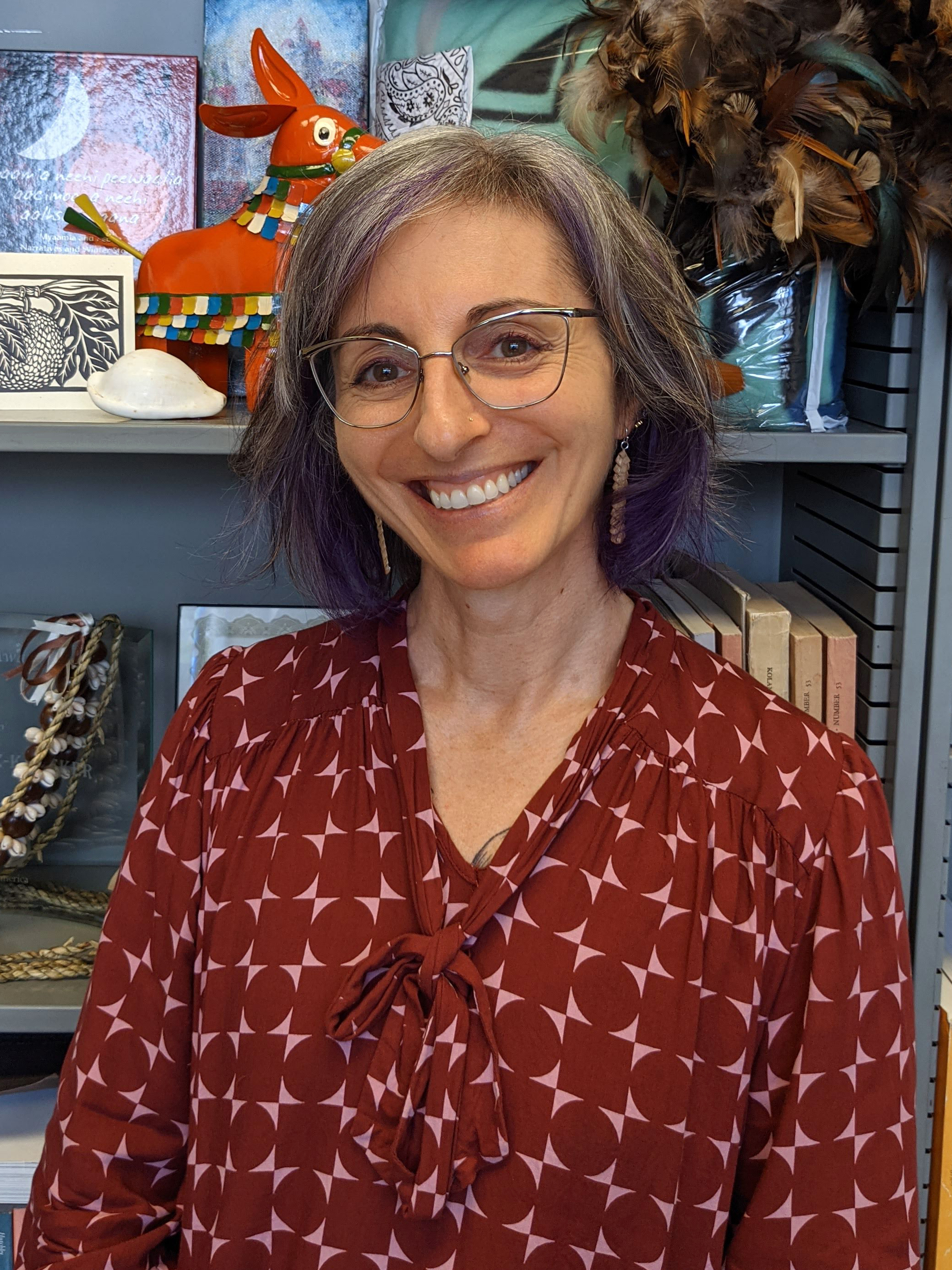
- Berez-Kroeker in 2023
- Occupation: Linguist

Academic background
- Education: University of California, Santa Barbara

Academic work
- Institutions: University of Hawaiʻi at Mānoa
- Main interests: Preservation of endangered languages, language technology

Andrea Berez-Kroeker is a documentary linguist and former professor in the Department of Linguistics at the University of Hawaiʻi at Mānoa. She is formerly the director of the Kaipuleohone archive of endangered languages, transitioning in 2024 to serve as the Associate Dean of Academic Personnel and Operations for the university's College of Arts, Languages & Letters. She is an expert on the practices of reproducibility and management of data in the field of linguistics.

== Early life and education ==
Berez-Kroeker graduated from the University of Michigan in 1994 with a Bachelor of Fine Arts, New York Academy of Art in 1998 with a Master of Fine Arts, Wayne State University in 2006 with a Master of Arts and the University of California, Santa Barbara in 2011 with a PhD.

== Language documentation ==
Berez-Kroeker's work has focused on the documentation and preservation of endangered languages. She has created language documentation materials for the Athabascan languages Ahtna and Dena'ina. She completed her Ph.D. at the University of California, Santa Barbara in 2011 with a dissertation titled "Discourse, Landscape, and Directional Reference in Ahtna." Her work on Ahtna includes using Geographic information system to investigate the lexicalization of directionals, a subcategory of deixis, in language.

Her recent documentary work in Papua New Guinea includes documentation of Kuman as well as a video documentary of Kere, a language.

She is the co-editor of books on linguistic data management, language change, and linguistic fieldwork.

== Linguistic data ==
Berez-Kroeker has given talks and workshops on reproducibility in the field of linguistics, including data sharing and citation. She currently works to create infrastructure that promotes the long-term sustainability and interoperability of data. She was a principal investigator for a National Science Foundation grant studying the practices of data citation and attribution of data in the field of linguistics, including the creation and dissemination of resources on data use and sharing.

== Honors and awards ==
Berez-Kroeker was the president of DELAMAN (Digital Endangered Languages and Musics Archives Network) from 2014 to 2016 and in 2017 was the senior co-chair of the Committee on Endangered Languages and Their Preservation of the Linguistic Society of America.

Berez-Kroeker received the Early Career Award in 2019 from the Linguistic Society of America for her work on the documentation of endangered languages. In particular, the society recognized her for the "technological sophistication to her work, especially in the areas of language archiving, data processing, and visualization."
