= A Grammar of Mam, a Mayan Language =

1983 grammar book

- First edition cover
- Author: Nora C. England
- Language: English
- Publisher: University of Texas Press
- Publication date: 1983
- ISBN: 0-292-72726-7 (first edition)
- Dewey Decimal: 497.4
- LC Class: PM3936 .E53

A Grammar of Mam, a Mayan Language is a non-fiction book by Nora C. England, published in 1983 by the University of Texas Press.

It is a grammar of the Mam language. The variety of Mam documented in this book is that of San Ildefonso Ixtahuacán.

== Background ==
The author had published a PhD thesis in 1975, and the book originates from this. Much of the development of the book stemmed from England's work with the Proyecto Lingüístico Marroquín, something noted in the book's introduction. The author had done relevant field work beginning in 1971, and it went up to circa the publication of the book.

== Contents ==
There are nine chapters, including the introduction. An analyzed text is one of the appendices, and there are two others.

The initial four chapters have morphological and phonological information.

William F. Hanks of the University of Chicago described the writing style as "relatively informal".

== Reception ==
Louanna Furbee of the University of Missouri described the book as "both lucid and approachable." Furbee stated that the information in the book is "readily" available.

Hanks stated that the book is "a generous and clear picture of an extremely interesting language". He stated that the book's lack of delving into "theoretical implications" is the "weakness" of the work. According to Hanks, "E's description of Mam has weaknesses as well as outstanding strengths."
