= Carol Genetti =

American linguist

- Born: 1961 (age 63–64)
- Education: University of Oregon (Ph.D.)
- Occupations: Linguist; professor

Carol E. Genetti (born 1961) is an American linguist who is known for her research into Tibeto-Burman languages and languages of the Himalayans.

== Academic career ==
Genetti earned her Ph.D. in Linguistics in 1990 from the University of Oregon. Genetti is an emerita professor from the University of California, Santa Barbara, where she was a faculty member in the Department of Linguistics until 2020. Between 2013 and 2020 she was also the Dean of the UCSB Graduate Division, and she served as Chair of the Department of Linguistics from 1999-2005. Genetti now serves as the Vice Provost for Graduate and Postdoctoral Programs at NYU Abu Dhabi, United Arab Emirates.

Her work into Newar language is the first comprehensive grammar, focusing on the Dolakhae dialect. Her investigation into languages of the Indosphere has increased understanding of many typological features, including auxiliaries.

In 2008, she founded InField (now called CoLang), an international training workshop in field linguistics and language documentation. (See papers in Grenoble and Furbee.) She served as Director of the first InField when it was hosted by the University of California, Santa Barbara. InField/CoLang has provided significant training/support for documentation of endangered languages in North America and worldwide.

== Awards and distinctions ==
- 2011. Distinguished visiting fellow, the Cairns Institute, James Cook University, Cairns, Australia.
- 2011. Chair, Committee on Endangered Languages and their Preservation, Linguistic Society of America
- 2009. Inaugural Georg von der Gabelentz Award, Association for Linguistic Typology (for A Grammar of Dolakha Newar)

== Publications ==
- 2014. How Languages Work: An Introduction to Language and Linguistics. Cambridge: Cambridge University Press. (Editor) ISBN 9781108454513
- 2013. (with Rebekka Siemens). Training as Empowering Social Action: An Ethical Response to Language Endangerment: Language Death, Endangerment, Documentation, and Revitalization. ed. by Edith Moravcsik and Kathleen Wheatley. New York: John Benjamins. https://doi.org/10.1075/slcs.142.04gen
- 2013. Tense-Aspect Morphology from Nominalizers in Newar. Functional-Historical Approaches to Explanation, ed. by Tim Thornes, Erik Andvik, Gwendolyn Hyslop, and Joana Jansen. (Typological Studies in Language 103.) John Benjamins. https://doi.org/10.1075/tsl.103.10gen
- 2011. The Tapestry of Dolakha Newar: Chaining, Embedding, and the Complexity of Sentences. Linguistic Typology 15. 5-24. https://doi.org/10.1515/lity.2011.002
- 2008. Syntactic Aspects of Nominalization in Five Tibeto-Burman Languages of the Himalayan Area. With Ellen Bartee, A. R. Coupe, Kristine Hildebrandt, and You-Jing Lin. Linguistics of the Tibeto-Burman Area 31(2), 97-144.
- 2007. A Grammar of Dolakha Newar. (Mouton Grammar Library 40.) Berlin: Mouton de Gruyter. https://doi.org/10.1515/9783110198812
