= RNLD =

RNLD may refer to:

- Resource Network for Linguistic Diversity, an organisation aiming to advance the sustainability of the world's Indigenous languages
- Registered Nurse Learning Disabilities, the title used to designate nurses who are registered with the Nursing and Midwifery Council (NMC) one of 4 fields of nursing in the United Kingdom

== See also ==
- RNL Architecture, formerly known as RNL Design, American company
