= CoLang =

Institute for Collaborative Language Research
- Abbreviation: CoLang
- Formation: 2008
- Founder: Carol Genetti
- Board of directors: CoLang Advisory Circle
- Formerly called: InField: Institute on Field Linguistics and Language Documentation

The Institute on Collaborative Language Research or CoLang is a biennial training institute in language documentation for any person interested in community-based, collaborative language work. CoLang has been described as part of a modern collaborative model in community-based methodologies of language revitalization and documentation.

== Activities ==
The institute happens in even-numbered summers (opposite the Linguistic Society of America Summer Institute) at various American universities, but it has drawn participants and instructors from around the world, including Australia, Canada, Kenya, Morocco, Nigeria, Singapore and the United Kingdom. The first part of the institute consists of two weeks of workshops on topics like community archiving, linguistics, audio and video recording, language teaching, and activism. The workshops are followed by a three or four week practicum where participants work intensively with speakers of a language to document it.

While each individual institute is organized by one or two local director(s), CoLang as a whole is governed by its Advisory Circle, which includes Indigenous scholars, linguistics professors, language activists, students, and representatives from partner organizations. Each institute has been funded by a grant from the National Science Foundation's Dynamic Language Infrastructure (formerly called Documenting Endangered Languages) program.

The first InField in 2008 resulted in ongoing collaboration between Kennedy Bosire and Carlos Nash for the completion of the Ekegusii encyclopedia and a dissertation on tone in Ekegusii, while the fifth CoLang in 2016 resulted in the development of a thirty-year revitalization plan for Kristang in Singapore. InField/CoLang has also resulted in ongoing community-based linguistics work in Kwak'wala and Kari’nja, among others.

== History ==
CoLang was founded in 2008 as InField, the Institute on Field Linguistics and Language Documentation, by Carol Genetti. The institute was renamed to CoLang and adopted a charter and Advisory Circle in 2012. CoLang announced a long-term partnership with the Linguistic Society of America (LSA) in 2015.

=== InField 2008 California ===
InField 2008 was held at the University of California Santa Barbara. The director was Carol Genetti. The practicum languages were Ekegusii, Kwak'wala, and Mende.

=== InField 2010 Oregon ===
InField 2010 was held at the University of Oregon. The director was Spike Gildea. The practicum languages were Northern Paiute, Uyghur, and Wapishana.

=== CoLang 2012 Kansas ===
CoLang 2012 was held at the University of Kansas. The directors were Arienne Dwyer and Carlos Nash. The practicum languages were Amazigh, Cherokee, and Uda.

=== CoLang 2014 Texas ===
CoLang 2014 was held at the University of Texas Arlington. The director was Colleen Fitzgerald. The practicum languages were Alabama, Apoala Mixtec (course in Spanish), Innu, and Ngambai.

=== CoLang 2016 Alaska ===
CoLang 2016 was held at the University of Alaska Fairbanks. The directors were Alice Taff and Siri Tuttle. The practicum languages were Han, Miyako, and Unangam Tunuu

=== CoLang 2018 Florida ===
CoLang 2018 was held at the University of Florida. The director was George Aaron Broadwell. The practicum languages were Timucua, Macuiltianguis Zapotec, and Nyangbo (Tutrugbu).

=== CoLang 2022 Montana ===
CoLang 2020 was to be held at the University of Montana, co-directed by Mizuki Miyashita and Susan Penfield. It was cancelled due to the COVID-19 pandemic, but took place in 2022. The practicum languages were Northern Cheyenne and South Bolivian Quechua

=== CoLang 2024 Arizona ===
CoLang 2024 was held at Arizona State University and Scottsdale Community College and was cohosted by ASU and Salt River Pima-Maricopa Indian Community. The practicum languages were Akimel O'odham, Piipaash and Cook Islands Māori.

== Advisory Circle ==
The CoLang Advisory Circle provides long-term stewardship of the Institute and guidance to the Local Organizing Committee for each individual Institute; it also seeks to develop public awareness of CoLang and the institute's commitment toward preserving and sustaining language diversity.

=== Current Advisory Circle ===
Current as of February 2017

- Fakhruddin Akhunzada (2020)
- Aaron Broadwell (2020)
- Ewa Czaykowska-Higgins (2018) (co-convener)
- Susan Gehr (2018) (co-convener)
- Spike Gildea (2020)
- Seunghun J. Lee (2020)
- Megan Lukaniec (2018)
- Leroi Morgan (2020)
- Carolyn O'Meara (2020)
- Jean-Luc Pierite (2020)
- Heather Powell (2020)
- Keren Rice (2018)
- Kris Stenzel (2020)
- Alice Taff (2020)
- Adrienne Tsikewa (2018)
- Kevin Martens Wong (2018)

== See also ==
- Endangered language
- Language revitalization
- Language documentation
