= Susan Smythe Kung =

American linguist

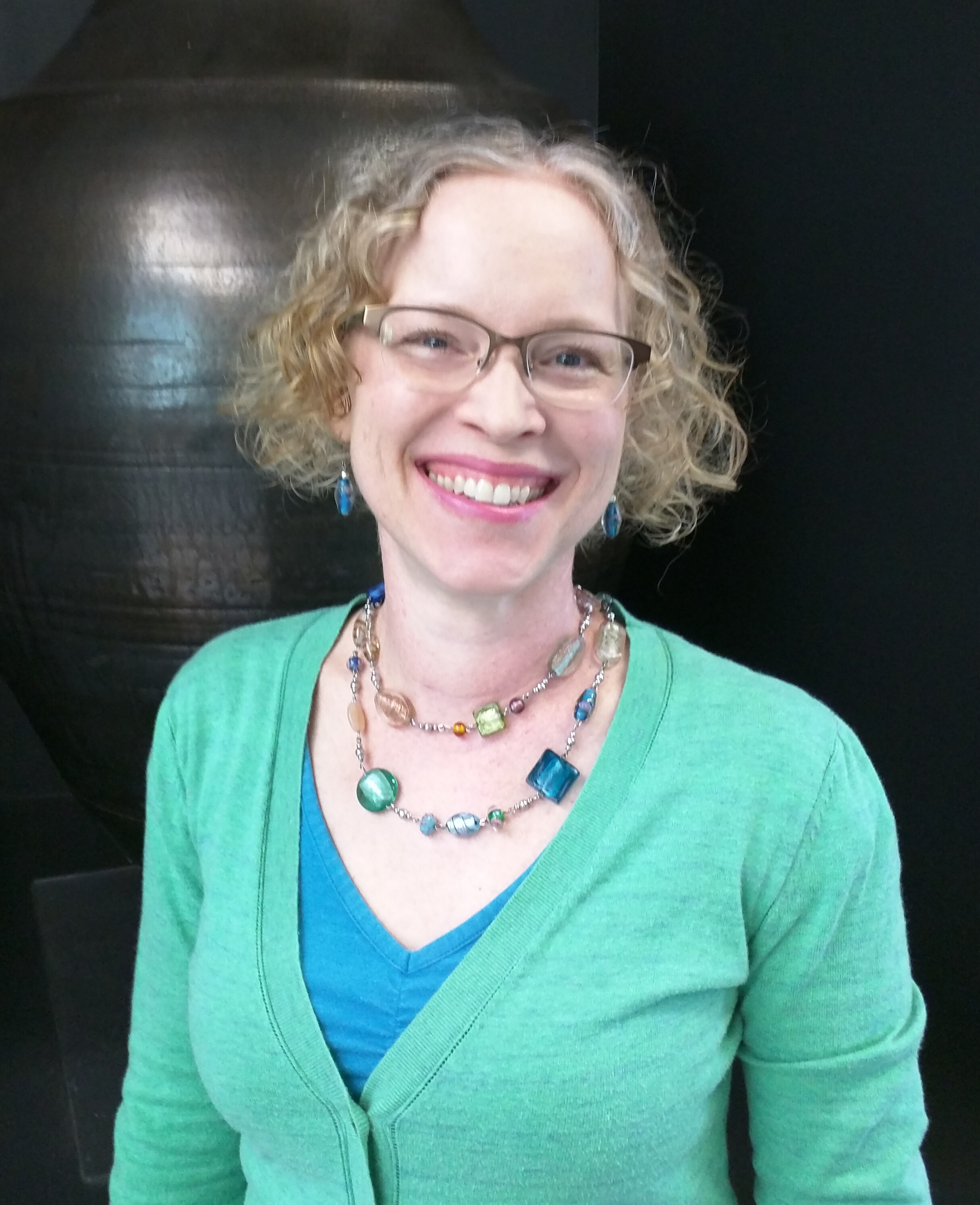
- A photograph of Susan Smythe Kung, taken in Fairbanks Alaska in June 2016.
- Scientific career
- Fields: Linguistics
- Institutions: University of Texas at Austin

Susan Smythe Kung is the Manager of the Archive of the Indigenous Languages of Latin America at the LLILAS Benson Latin American Studies and Collections at the University of Texas at Austin. Kung is a linguist who specializes in endangered language archiving and the Huehuetla Tepehua language of Hidalgo, Mexico. She earned her doctorate in linguistics in 2007 from the University of Texas at Austin, and her dissertation, A Descriptive Grammar of Huehuetla Tepehua won the Mary R. Haas Book Award from the Society for the Study of the Indigenous Languages of the Americas. Kung is the President of DELAMAN, the Digital Endangered Languages and Musics Archives Network from 2016-2018 and is a founding member of the Linguistics Data Interest Group (LDIG) of the Research Data Alliance.

== Selected publications ==
- Kung, Susan Smythe (2007). A Descriptive Grammar of Huehuetla Tepehua (Ph.D. thesis). The University of Texas at Austin.
- Berez-Kroeker, Andrea L.; Gawne, Lauren; Kung, Susan Smythe; Kelly, Barbara F.; Heston, Tyler; Holton, Gary; Pulsifer, Peter; Beaver, David I.; Chelliah, Shobhana; Dubinsky, Stanley; Meier, Richard P.; Thieberger, Nick; Rice, Keren; Woodbury, Anthony C. (2018). "Reproducible research in linguistics: A position statement on data citation and attribution in our field". Linguistics. 56: 1–18. doi:10.1515/ling-2017-0032.
- Berez-Kroeker, Andrea L.; Andreassen, Helene N.; Gawne, Lauren; Holton, Gary; Kung, Susan Smythe; Pulsifer, PPeter; Collister, Lauren B. (2017). "Draft: The Austin Principles of Data Citation in Linguistics". 0.1. The Data Citation and Attribution in Linguistics Group and the Linguistics Data Interest Group.
- Kung, Susan Smythe; Sherzer, Joel (2013). "The Archive of the Indigenous Languages of Latin America: An Overview". Oral Tradition. 28 (2): 379–388. doi:10.1353/ort.2013.0011. hdl:10355/65320.
- Kung, Susan Smythe (2012). "Los compadres. Cuento en Tepehua de Huehuetla" [The compadres. A story in Huehuetla Tepehua]. In Levy, Paulette; Beck, David (eds.). Las lenguas totonacos y tepehuas. Textos y otros materiales para su estudio. Mexico City: UNAM. pp. 55–77. ISBN 9786070233449.
- Kung, Susan Smythe (2012). "Los dos hermanos. Cuento en Tepehua de Huehuetla" [The two brothers. A story in Huehuetla Tepehua]. In Levy, Paulette; Beck, David (eds.). Las lenguas totonacos y tepehuas. Textos y otros materiales para su estudio. Mexico City: UNAM. pp. 78–96. ISBN 9786070233449.
