= Joel Sherzer =

Anthropological linguist (b. 1942)

- Born: March 18, 1942
- Died: November 6, 2022 (aged 80); Austin, Texas, U.S.
- Awards: Guggenheim Fellowship (1978); Society for the Study of the Indigenous Languages of the Americas Archiving Award (2018)

Academic background
- Education: University of Pennsylvania (PhD)

Academic work
- Discipline: Linguistic anthropologist
- Sub-discipline: Ethnography of speaking; Language documentation; Indigenous languages of the Americas
- Institutions: University of Texas at Austin

Joel Fred Sherzer (March 18, 1942 – November 6, 2022) was an American anthropological linguist known for his research with the Guna people of Panama and his focus on verbal art and discourse-centered approaches to linguistic research. He co-founded the Archive of the Indigenous Languages of Latin America. Sherzer completed his Ph.D. at the University of Pennsylvania in 1968 and thereafter taught at the University of Texas at Austin for his entire career.

== Awards ==
- 1978 Guggenheim Fellowship
- 2018 Society for the Study of the Indigenous Languages of the Americas Archiving Award

== The Archive of the Indigenous Languages of Latin America ==
Over the course of his research career, Sherzer observed that scholars were creating substantial collections of recordings and texts in indigenous Latin American languages, and he was concerned about the preservation of these priceless collections of indigenous verbal art. In 2001, Sherzer, along with Anthony Woodbury and Mark McFarland, founded the Archive of the Indigenous Languages of Latin America to collect, digitize, and permanently preserve these resources and make them freely available over the internet.

== Works ==
- Adoring the saints: Fiestas in Central Mexico. Yolanda Lastra, Dina Sherzer, and Joel Sherzer. Austin: University of Texas Press. 2009
- Stories, myths, chants, and songs of the Kuna Indians. Compiled, edited and translated by Joel Sherzer. Austin: University of Texas Press. 2004
- Speech play and verbal art. Austin: University of Texas Press. 2002.
- Translating Native American Verbal Art: Ethnopoetics and Ethnography of Speaking. Edited by Kay Sammons and Joel Sherzer. Washington, D.C.: Smithsonian Institution Press. 2000.
- Verbal art in San Blas: Kuna culture through its discourse. Cambridge: Cambridge University Press. 1990
- Las culturas nativas Latino Americanas a través de su discurso. Editors Ellen Basso and Joel Sherzer. Quito: Ediciones Abya-Yala. 1990.
- Native American Discourse: Poetics and Rhetoric. Joel Sherzer and Anthony C. Woodbury. Cambridge: Cambridge University Press. 1987.
- Native South American discourse. Editors Joel Sherzer and Greg Urban. Berlin: Mouton de Gruyter. 1986.
- Kuna ways of speaking: An ethnographic perspective. Austin: University of Texas Press. 1983.
- The origin and diversification of language. Edited posthumously by Joel Sherzer Chicago: Aldine-Atherton. 1971.
