= Faurie =

Faurie may refer to:

== Place ==
- La Faurie, a commune in the Hautes-Alpes department in southeastern France

== People ==
- Claire Moyse-Faurie (born 1949), French linguist
- Emile Faurie (born 1963), British equestrian
- Jorge Faurie (born 1951), Argentine diplomat
