= Nora England =

American linguist (1946–2022)

Nora Clearman England
- Born: November 8, 1946
- Died: January 26, 2022 (aged 75)
- Known for: Founding director of the Center for Indigenous Languages of Latin America (CILLA)
- Title: Dallas TACA Centennial Professor in the Humanities
- Awards: MacArthur Fellow, Fellow of the Linguistic Society of America

Academic background
- Education: Bryn Mawr College (BA); University of Florida (MA, PhD)
- Thesis: Mam Grammar in Outline (1975)
- Doctoral advisor: Martha James Hardman

Academic work
- Discipline: Linguistics
- Sub-discipline: Language documentation, linguistic typology, Mayan languages, language politics, language ideology
- Institutions: Proyecto Lingüístico Francisco Marroquín (PLFM) (1971–1973); University of Florida (1975); Mississippi State University (1975–1977); University of Iowa (1977–2001); Universidad Mariano Gálvez (1990); Universidad Rafael Landívar (1990, 1992, 1994, 1997); Oxlajuuj Keej Maya’ Ajtz’iib’ (1990–2009); The University of Texas at Austin (2001–2022)
- Website: UT Faculty Page

Nora Clearman England (November 8, 1946 – January 26, 2022) was an American linguist, Mayanist, and Dallas TACA Centennial Professor at the University of Texas at Austin. Her research focused on the grammar of Mayan languages and contemporary Mayan language politics.

== Education and career ==
England graduated from Bryn Mawr College with a B.A. in 1967 and the University of Florida in 1975 with an M.A. and a Ph.D. While there, she led a workshop and field visit to Iximche, attended by Linda Schele and Nicholai Grube.

After taking a post as a linguistics professor at the University of Texas in Austin in 2001, she became the founding director of the Center for Indigenous Languages of Latin America (CILLA). The University of Texas hosts England's Mayan Language Collection at the Archive of the Indigenous Languages of Latin America.

England's previous experiences include teaching positions at Mississippi State University and the University of Iowa, and training more than 100 Mayanists who have since gone on to work in various fields and are part of the first Maya generation able to receive substantial postsecondary education.

England died on January 26, 2022, at the age of 75.

== Awards and honors ==
- 1993–1998 MacArthur Fellows Program
- In 2017, England was inducted as a Fellow of the Linguistic Society of America.

== Works ==
- "Issues in comparative argument structure analysis in Mayan narratives'", Preferred argument structure: grammar as architecture for function, Editors John W. Du Bois, Lorraine Edith Kumpf, William J. Ashby, John Benjamins Publishing Company, 2003, ISBN 978-90-272-2624-2
- "Mayan efforts toward language preservation", Endangered languages: language loss and community response, Editors Lenore A. Grenoble, Lindsay J. Whaley, Cambridge University Press, 1998, ISBN 978-0-521-59712-8
- "Control and Complementation at Kusaal", Current approaches to African linguistics, Volume 4, Editor David Odden, Walter de Gruyter, 1987, ISBN 978-90-6765-312-1
- A grammar of Mam, a Mayan language, University of Texas Press, 1983, ISBN 9780292727267
- "Space as a Mam Grammatical Theme", Papers in Mayan linguistics, Editor Nora C. England, Dept. of Anthropology, University of Missouri-Columbia, 1978, ISBN 978-0-913134-87-0

== Bibliography ==
- England, Nora Clearman (1975). Mam Grammar in Outline (digital reproduction at Internet Archive). Doctoral thesis/dissertation. Gainesville: University of Florida. OCLC 3497675.
