= Living Languages =

International non-profit organization

Living Languages is an international non-profit organisation which was established to advance the sustainability of the world's Indigenous languages.

== History ==
The organisation was founded as the Resource Network for Linguistic Diversity (RNLD) in 2004 by linguists Margaret Florey and Nicholas Thieberger as a resource organisation aiming to support linguistic diversity by offering a range of training programs, facilitating networking between language maintenance practitioners, and maintaining a website with various practical resources. Living Languages is incorporated in Victoria, Australia, and is registered as a tax-exempt organisation. Funded activities by Living Languages are primarily supported by the Indigenous Languages Support (ILS) grant scheme from the Government of Australia. In September 2019, it renamed to 'Living Languages', with the stated goal of better reflecting the organisation's mission.

== Mission ==
When initially founded as the RNLD, its mission statement was stated as:

RNLD's mission is to advance the sustainability of Indigenous languages and to increase the participation of Indigenous peoples in all aspects of language documentation and revitalisation through training, resource sharing, networking, and advocacy. Through our activities, we contribute to the holistic health and wellbeing of Aboriginal and Torres Strait Islander communities by providing direct relief from the suffering and distress that arises from the loss of Indigenous languages and the consequent alienation from cultural heritage and Indigenous identity.

— RNLD

Since renaming to Living Languages in 2019, this was updated to:

To create a positive input to Australian Aboriginal and Torres Strait Islander community resilience, health, wellbeing and cultural identity through enabling the sustainability of Indigenous languages.

— Living Languages

== Resources ==
Living Languages provides a range of resources to support language documentation and revitalisation activities. These include information about national and international funding opportunities for language work, links to blogs and networks including the active the organisation's email discussion list, and other resources for language documentation and revitalisation such as information about software, language materials, language centres, equipment for language work, orthography development, data management, training programs, and language documentation projects.
