= Sound and Audio archives =

Collection of sound recordings

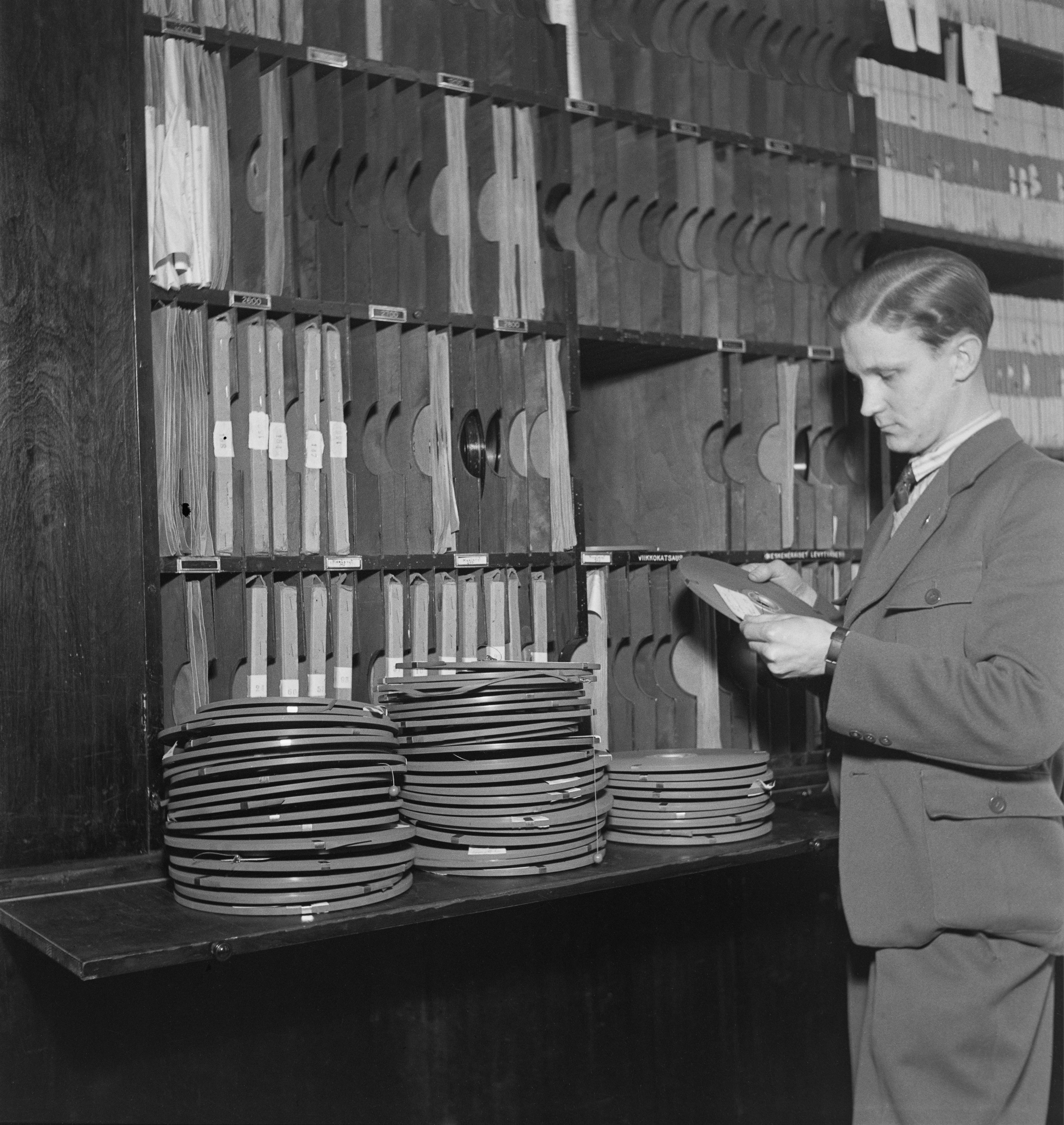
A collection of tapes in a sound archive library

Sound archives, audio archives, radio archives, oral history archives are collections of sound recordings, broadcasts, live audio performances, or field recordings that encourage exploration, sharing, and sometimes creative re-use of voices, stories, and audio-art from the past and exploring how they can provide fresh perspectives on the present and future.

Sound archives can play a useful role in raising awareness of how views on a wide range of social, artistic, academic, journalistic, and quotidian human experiences have evolved, especially by providing listeners to access to voices and ideas that might otherwise be lost to history.

There are many contemporary debates about the importance of sound and audio archives, how they might be funded, made more accessible, and used more creatively in the future.

== Examples of Sound, Audio, Radio, Oral History Archives ==
A few examples of curated sound and audio archives:

- British Library Sound Archive
- Canadian Broadcasting Corporation Radio Archives
- Charles Parker Radio Archive
- Internet Archive's Audio Archive
- Library of Congress Audio Archive
- National Film and Sound Archive of Australia
- New Zealand Sound Archives
- NPR Archives
- Pacifica Radio Archive
- Studs Terkel Radio Archive
- Third Coast Audio Festival
- Transom Audio Archives
- UbuWeb
- WNYC Radio Archives

A more extensive list of sound and audio archives can be found here.

While some audio, sound, radio, oral history archives are run by major institutions, governments, libraries, museums, universities, public or commercial broadcasters, there are also many managed by small non-profit and charity organisations, community radio stations, activists, and individuals. This can result in varying methods for storing and protecting archives and different policies around access and re-use.

There is also an important challenge in finding creative ways to make sound and audio archives in languages other than English accessible to people who do not know those languages.

Experiments such as Radio Atlas, the Third Coast International Audio Festival Short Docs Competition, and others have played a useful role in bridging this language barrier.

Debates about funding for sound archives also present important challenges for their future preservation.

== Creative Use of Sound and Audio Archives ==
Audio archives can inspire the production of new work, such as radio features, musical compositions and performances, museum exhibits, audio walking tours, audio festivals, theater productions, film, school curricula, activism campaigns, and video games.

=== Radio shows and podcasts that use Sound Archives for creative use ===
Many radio shows and podcasts make use of audio and sound archives. Here are a few examples:

- BBC Radio's "Archive on 4" series has a long history of presenting archival audio in new contexts.
- The Kitchen Sisters radio and podcast series "Lost and Found Sounds" explored audio archives and vanishing voices.
- The Association for Cultural Equity has worked with the Alan Lomax Collection at the American Folklife Center at the Library of Congress to produce the podcast "Been All Around this World" using audio field recordings made by the musicologist Alan Lomax.

=== Music Compositions that use Sound and Audio Archives for creative re-use ===
Some useful and celebrated examples of music composers and performers using sound, audio, oral history archives in inventive ways include:

- Kronos Quartet has a long history of commissioning original compositions using voices from archives such as the work "Soliloquy" featuring the voice of journalist I.F. Stone and "Glorious Mahalia" featuring the voice of gospel singer Mahalia Jackson talking about the Civil Rights Movement.
- John Cage took a innovative approach to "real time" creating of radio archive music making with several compositions that use radios and chance operations as musical instruments, most notably Imaginary Landscape #4 which involved musicians re-using the sounds of 12 radios.
- Steve Reich composed numerous works that use spoken word from various archival sources such as the pieces Come Out, It's Gonna Rain, and Different Trains.
- Pauline Oliveros, composer, accordion player, and proponent of "deep listening" experimented with spoken word interwoven with composed music in work such as In Memorium Mt. Whitney, Rattlesnake Mountain, Beautiful Soop, and Poem of Change.
- Glenn Gould, the celebrated classical pianist, produced a trilogy of experimental radio soundscapes in the 1960s and 1970s using oral history interviews in a method he called "contrapuntal radio."
- Julia Wolfe composed several works using voices from archives such as Anthracite Fields which explores the history of coal mining.
- Gavin Bryars used archival voices in a number of celebrated music compositions, most notably Jesus' Blood Never Failed Me Yet and The Sinking of the Titanic.

=== Theater, Film and Television that uses Sound and Audio Archives to create new work ===
There is a long and rich history of theater artists creating productions using audio, sound, and especially oral history archives, sometimes known as Verbatim or Documentary Theatre. Some prominent examples include.

XMTR Audio Arts Festival sign

=== Festivals and Conferences that explore Sound Archive creative re-use ===
Festivals and Conferences such as Third Coast Audio Festival, Hearsay, XMTR, UK Oral History Society, Charles Parker Radio Day, and many others have played an important role in raising awareness and generating discussions about potential ways of using sound, audio, radio, and oral history archives in the future.

There is also a growing range of radio, sound-art, oral history conferences in parts of the world where English is not the primary language that explore how audio and sound archives can migrate between languages.

== Samples of Creative Reuse of Sound and Audio Archives ==
The practical, social, and artistic value of using sound and audio archival material for the creation of new work can be demonstrated through examples such as:

Audio Archive Creative Reuse example #1 – Using music, field recordings, and slight looping to underscore ideas and emotions from an oral history audio recording of a Yorkshireman talking about "how to entice fish" and his philosophy of life while in hospice, creatively reused from an audio archive of oral histories about a working-class council estate in Leeds, UK.

Other samples of Sound and Audio Archive Creative Reuse might explore juxtaposing voices from different places and times, use of field recordings, use of microphones that allow hearing of sounds not normally accessible to the human ear, and many other techniques.

== Debates about copyright, licensing and rights to re-use audio and sound archives ==
There are a wide range of opinions, best-practices, policies, and laws around when and how audio and sound archives may be re-used.

The rapid development of Artificial Intelligence is also adding new complexity to the question of re-use of audio archives as part of a wider debate about use of the work of other artists and creators.

== See also ==
- List of sound, audio, radio, and oral history archives
