= Marie Slocombe =

Marie Tapscott Slocombe MBE (1912–1995) founded the BBC Sound Archive in 1936. Her keen interest in audio recordings and folk music have made her legacy important in the history of recorded sound.

== Early life and career ==
Born in 1912, Slocombe studied at Lady Margaret Hall, Oxford, where she gained a First in French. As a secretary in the Foreign Office she undertook temporary work at the BBC in 1936, and as part of this work was tasked to sort out and dispose of "a pile of dusty broadcast discs." On discovering that these included speeches and readings by contemporary figures such as George Bernard Shaw, H. G. Wells, Winston Churchill and others, instead of disposing of them, she realised their historical significance and resolved to preserve them.

In these early days, the BBC had only one sound recording machine, a Blattnerphone tape recorder, and transcribing recordings to disc for retention was expensive; this led to "indifference, even opposition" from BBC management. However, she persevered, even keeping a recording of Edward VIII's abdication speech, even though the BBC had been told not to record it, and by 1939 had amassed about 2,000 discs, including recordings of Hitler and Goebbels.

== Recognition ==
In 1941 she was appointed as the first Sound Recordings Librarian and instituted a structured indexing system.

After the war, she began collecting sound recordings from around the world, including birdsong, particularly acquiring the recordings of Ludwig Koch and other material. She was also a member of the English Folk Dance and Song Society and ensured that folksong was well covered, becoming pivotal in several projects to record and retain British folk music. She began a collaboration with the Leeds University Dialect Survey which provided a large collection of British dialects.

== Legacy ==
After retiring from the BBC in 1972, Slocombe retained her interest in folk music, editing the newsletter of the English Folk Dance and Song Society for several years.

Her work was commemorated by a BBC Radio 4 documentary, Saving the Sounds of History, broadcast on 1 September 2007. In an essay, she regretted the BBC's lack of support for folk music, whilst acknowledging the opportunity to collect such examples.

== Publications ==
- Slocombe, Marie (1955). "Storage of tape recordings". Journal of the Society of Archivists. 1 (8): 226–228. doi:10.1080/00379815509513661.
