= National Poetry Library =

Library in London

Coordinates: 51°30′20.56″N 00°07′0.34″W

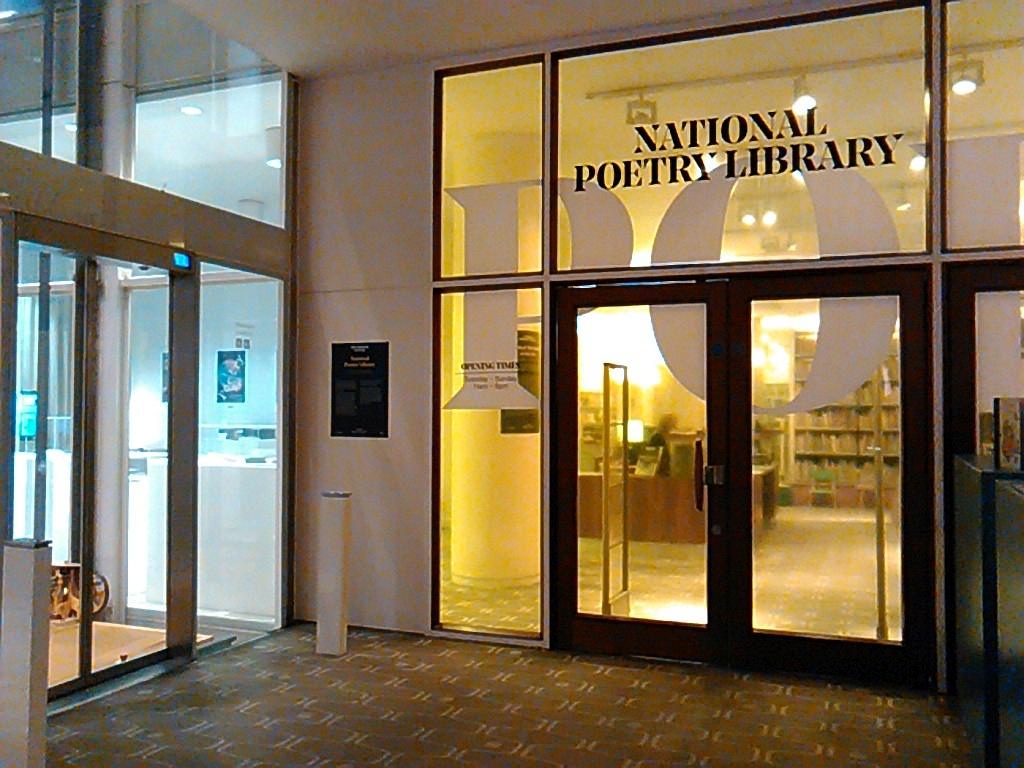
- Location: Level 5, Royal Festival Hall, Southbank Centre, London SE1 8XX
- Type: National library
- Scope: Including contemporary UK poetry publications since 1912
- Established: 1953

Collection
- Items collected: books, journals, cuttings, poetry magazines, audio and video recordings, children's poetry, critical texts
- Size: over 200,000 items

Access and use
- Access requirements: Open to anyone. Free membership

Other information
- Website: The Poetry Library

The National Poetry Library is a free public collection housed at Royal Festival Hall in London's Southbank Centre. Situated on the fifth floor of the Royal Festival Hall, overlooking the river Thames, the library aims to hold all contemporary UK poetry publications since 1912. It houses the largest collection in Britain, numbering over 200,000 items, including works by small presses. It also holds audio and video materials, critical texts and works for children for loan and reference.

The library contains work by non-UK poets and publishers and press cuttings are also archived for members' research. Membership is free and material is borrowed through the national inter-lending library services or returned by post. The library provides support for schools nationally and locally. The venue has an exhibition and event space.

== History and future plans ==
Use and enjoy this place. Burrow in, borrow on.

— John Hegley
speaking of the Poetry Library

This is a pleasant library. I'd enjoy every minute
But for the danger of meeting other poets in it.

— Wendy Cope
speaking of the Poetry Library

The library was established in 1953 on the recommendation of the Poetry Panel of the Arts Council of Great Britain, with the remit of promoting modern and contemporary poetry. Opened by poets TS Eliot and Herbert Read, the library quickly grew beyond the capacity of premises and then the next, moving from Albemarle Street to Piccadilly, to Long Acre in Covent Garden and then to a larger space back in Piccadilly.

It has been located at the Royal Festival Hall since 1988, when Seamus Heaney opened the new venue. With the relocation, the library was given the Signal Poetry Collection of children's poetry books which had been held by Book House. This formed the basis for the library's body of works for children and young adults, available for loan and reference. The beech furniture was designed for the site by Terrance Conran. The library was closed from 2005 to 2007 during refurbishment of the Festival Hall building. Its re-opening was celebrated with London's first festival of literature.

The Poetry Library:
housing
of arousing
browsing

— Roger McGough
speaking of the Poetry Library

Commentators on BBC's Radio 4 have described it as one of the world's greatest libraries. Many poets and editors have developed their collections and anthologies at the Poetry Library, including Poet Laureate Ted Hughes. He worked on the Rattle Bag anthology at the library during the 1970s, writing of the experience:

Very strange experience, squeezing every morning into modern poetry, and sitting in there all day all curled up with book clamped over mouth inhaling deeply, then coming out in the five or six o clock dark. Many other poets find their inspiration in the library. It's truly a place where poets and readers meet. As well as poets laureate, though, we see school students, families with young children, casual readers, critics, academics, teachers and artists 'squeezing every morning into modern poetry.

Poet Philip Larkin was a vocal supporter. He wrote "The Poetry Library is one of the occasional pure flowerings of the imagination for which the English are so seldom given credit". Poet Laureate Andrew Motion echoes Larkin's sentiments: "The most extraordinary thing, is the fact that it exists at all. As Larkin said, it's the kind of thing that you don't expect England to do. It flies in the face of the way we generally run things, ie neglect things. I used it a lot when I was doing the Here to Eternity anthology. The stock is extremely good and very catholic – and the ancillary services, such as quote-checking, are wonderful."

The library has a bronze bust of Dylan Thomas by Hugh Oloff de Wet.
