= List of music archivists =

This is a list of music archivists.

== Music archivists ==
- Santiago Álvarez
- Alan Leeds
- Alan Lomax
- David Marks
- Todd Matshikiza
- Eleanor Mlotek
- Einojuhani Rautavaara
- Arthur Warren Darley
- Tiny Tim

== See also ==
- List of sound archives
- List of archivists
