= Live Music Archive =

Music collection hosted by Internet Archive

- The LMA in June 2008
- Website type: Live music trading
- Owner: Internet Archive
- Creator: Brewster Kahle
- Website: www.archive.org/details/etree
- Commercial: No
- Registration: Optional
- Launched: 1996
- Current status: Active

The Live Music Archive (LMA), part of the Internet Archive, is an ad-free collection of over 250,000 concert recordings in lossless audio formats. The songs are also downloadable or playable in lossy formats such as Ogg Vorbis or MP3. The website is known for its extensive collection of Grateful Dead recordings, and contains music from many other bands.

== History ==
The collection increases in size due to the contribution of concert recordings by etree participants.

== Artists ==
The majority of artists are jam bands. Others include The Smashing Pumpkins, Tenacious D, Warren Zevon, Ween, Little Feat. and smaller independent bands.

== See also ==
- List of sound archives
