= Archive of the Indigenous Languages of Latin America =

Digital archive

The Archive of the Indigenous Languages of Latin America (AILLA) is a digital repository housed in LLILAS Benson Latin American Studies and Collections at the University of Texas at Austin. AILLA is a digital language archive dedicated to the digitization and preservation of primary data, such as field notes, texts, audio and video recordings, in or about Latin American indigenous languages. AILLA's holdings are available on the Internet and are open to the public wherever privacy and intellectual property concerns are met. AILLA has access portals in both English and Spanish; all metadata are available in both languages, as well as in indigenous languages where possible.

== Purpose ==
In this global media age, more and more indigenous languages are being superseded by global languages such as Spanish, English, and Portuguese. Frequently, recordings made by researchers such as linguists, anthropologists, and ethnomusicologists, and by community members and speakers, are the only record of these languages. These recordings might be stored in university offices or in private homes where they are not accessible to others. AILLA provides a permanent home for these recordings in order to make them available to the speakers and to the rest of the world via the Internet.

== Archive ==
The collection currently contains roughly 7,500 hours of archived audio materials, representing more than 300 languages from at least 28 countries. This is supplemented by a significant number of images, videos, and text files. Altogether, the archive contains more than 110,000 individual files (correct as of June 2016).

The database of archived materials can be freely searched via both the English and Spanish portals available on the AILLA webpage, as well as the Open Languages Archives Community. Direct access to archived recordings requires registration and sometimes needs permission as specified by the depositor. Downloads are free of charge.

A large part of the project is the digitization of valuable analog recordings of languages and cultures from the Latin America that will otherwise deteriorate or be lost forever. Researchers whose materials are represented in these collections include Terrence Kaufman, Lyle Campbell, and Nora England.

Analog recordings are digitized at the highest possible fidelity to ensure high-quality digital files result. The current international archive standard for PCM audio files is 24-bit resolution and a sample rate of 96 kHz. AILLA employs the same standard to ensure that digital copies of the highest practicable fidelity are produced.

== Affiliations ==
AILLA is funded by the College of Liberal Arts and the University of Texas Libraries at The University of Texas at Austin. AILLA's main office is located at the Nettie Lee Benson Latin American Collection. The archive is currently headed by Susan Smythe Kung, Joel Sherzer, Anthony C. Woodbury, and Patience Epps.

== Other information ==
AILLA was founded in 2000 by Joel Sherzer, professor emeritus in the Department of Linguistics at The University of Texas at Austin. The archive is a member of the Digital Endangered Languages and Musics Archives Network (DELAMAN). AILLA is an archive of record for the Documenting Endangered Languages program of the National Science Foundation.

== See also ==
- Colección de Lenguas Indígenas
