= Andrew Motion =

English poet and writer (born 1952)

Sir Andrew Motion FRSL
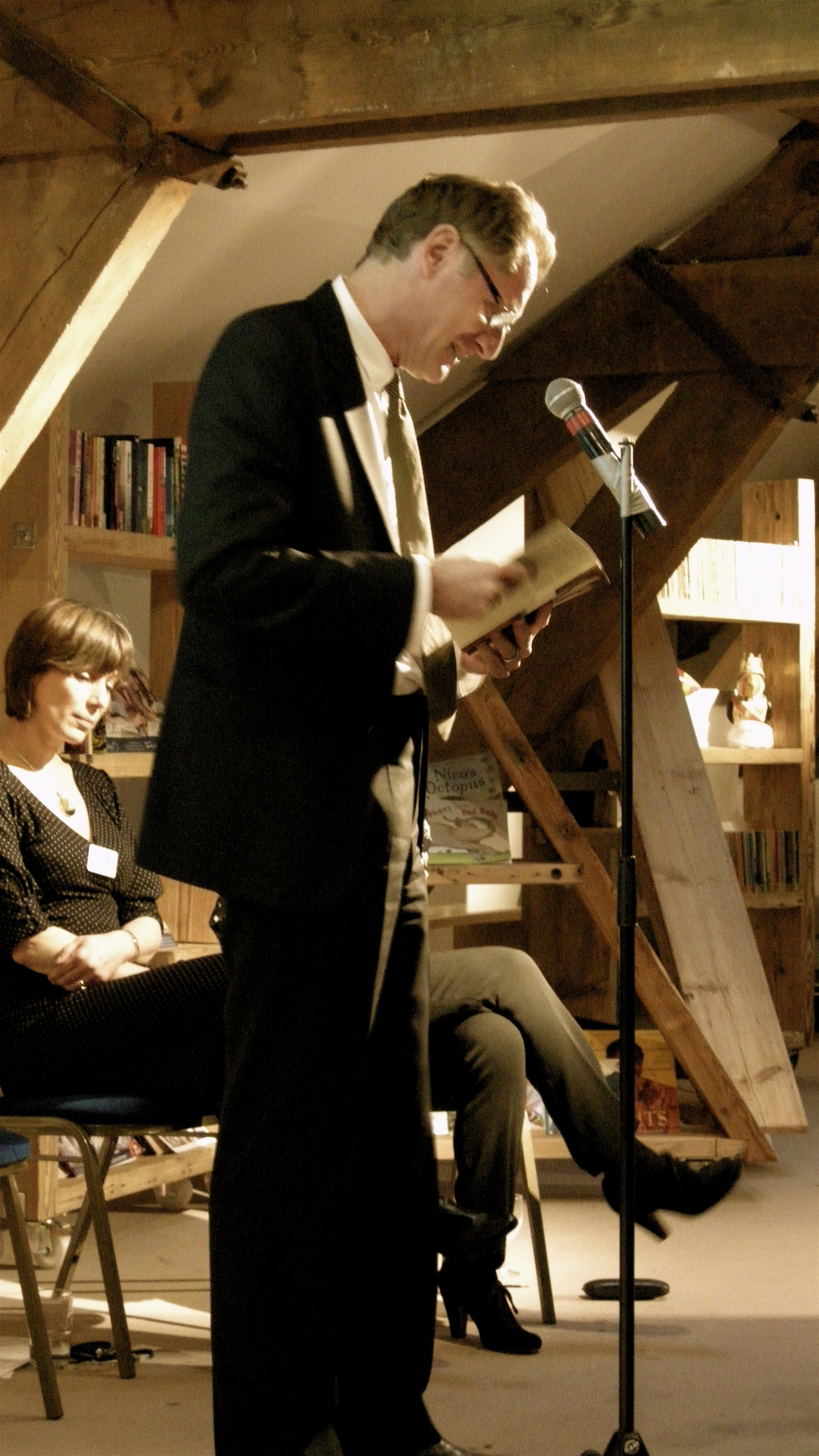
- Motion reading poetry in 2009

Poet Laureate of the United Kingdom
- In office 1 May 1999 – 1 May 2009
- Monarch: Elizabeth II
- Preceded by: Ted Hughes
- Succeeded by: Carol Ann Duffy

Personal details
- Born: 26 October 1952 (age 73) London, England
- Spouses: Joanna Powell (div. 1983); Jan Dalley (m. 1985; div. 2009); Kyeong-Soo Kim (m. 2010)
- Children: 3
- Education: Radley College
- Alma mater: University College, Oxford (MLitt)
- Occupation: Poet

Sir Andrew Motion FRSL (born 26 October 1952) is an English poet, novelist, and biographer, who was Poet Laureate from 1999 to 2009. During the period of his laureateship, Motion founded the Poetry Archive, an online resource of poems and audio recordings of poets reading their own work. In 2012, he became President of the Campaign to Protect Rural England, taking over from Bill Bryson.

== Early life ==
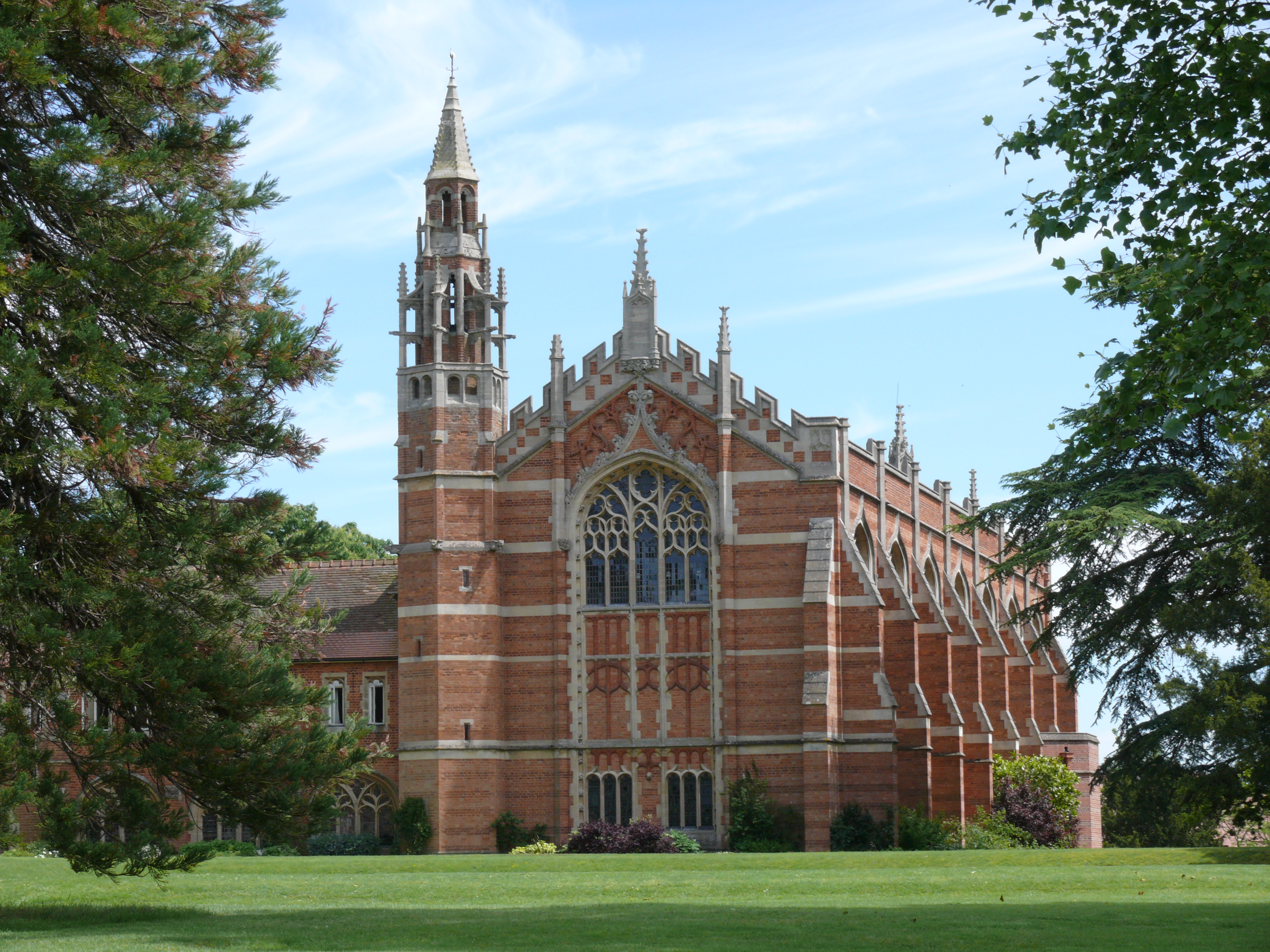
Radley College

Motion was born on 26 October 1952 in London, to (Andrew) Richard Michael Motion (1921–2006), a brewer at Ind Coope, and (Catherine) Gillian (née Bakewell; 1928–1978). Richard Motion was from a brewing dynasty; his grandfather founded Taylor Walker, but by Richard Motion's time this had been absorbed by Ind Coope. The Motion family were wealthy armigers who lived at Upton House, Banbury, Oxfordshire, and were prominent in the local area; Richard Motion's grandfather Andrew Richard Motion was a Justice of the Peace for Essex, Oxfordshire and Warwickshire, who had worked his way up from being a brewery labourer in the East End of London to ownership of his own successful brewery. When his children had grown up and married, he sold the Upton House estate and went to live at Stisted Hall, in Essex.

As a child, Motion lived in Kimpton, Hertfordshire, and then in Hatfield Heath. He attended primary school in Much Hadham, before attending boarding school at Maidwell Hall from the age of seven, joined by his younger brother. When Motion was 12 years old, the family moved to Glebe House at Stisted, near Braintree in Essex, where Richard Motion's grandparents had previously lived at Stisted Hall, by that time converted into a home for the elderly. Most of his friends were from the school and so when Motion was in the village, he spent a lot of time on his own. He began to have an interest and affection for the countryside, and he went for walks with a pet dog. Later he went to Radley College, where, in the sixth form, he encountered Peter Way, an inspiring English teacher who introduced him to poetry – first Thomas Hardy, then Philip Larkin, W. H. Auden, Seamus Heaney, Ted Hughes, Wordsworth and Keats.

When Motion was 17 years old, his mother had a horse-riding accident and suffered a serious head injury requiring a lifesaving neurosurgery operation. She regained some speech, but she was severely paralysed and remained in and out of coma for nine years. She died in 1978 and her husband died of cancer in 2006. Motion has said that he wrote to keep his memory of his mother alive. When Motion was about 18 years old, he moved away from the village to study English at University College, Oxford; however, since then he has remained in contact with the village to visit the church graveyard, where his parents are buried, and also to see his brother, who lives nearby. At university he studied at weekly sessions with W. H. Auden, whom he greatly admired. Motion won the university's Newdigate Prize and graduated with a first-class honours degree. This was followed by an MLitt on the poetry of Edward Thomas.

== Career ==
Between 1976 and 1980, Motion taught English at the University of Hull and while there, at the age of 24, he had his first volume of poetry published. At Hull, he met the university librarian and poet Philip Larkin. Motion was later appointed as one of Larkin's literary executors, which would privilege Motion's role as his biographer following Larkin's death in 1985. In Philip Larkin: A Writer's Life, Motion says that at no time during their nine-year friendship did they discuss writing his biography and it was Larkin's longtime companion Monica Jones who requested it. Motion reports how, as executor, he rescued many of Larkin's papers from imminent destruction following his friend's death. His 1993 biography of Larkin, which won the Whitbread Prize for Biography, was responsible for bringing about a substantial revision of Larkin's reputation.

Motion was editorial director and poetry editor at Chatto & Windus (1983–89); he edited the Poetry Society's Poetry Review from 1980 to 1982 and succeeded Malcolm Bradbury as professor of creative writing at the University of East Anglia. Motion is now on the faculty at the Johns Hopkins Writing Seminars.

=== Laureateship ===
Motion was appointed Poet Laureate on 1 May 1999, following the death of Ted Hughes, the previous incumbent. The Nobel Prize–winning Northern Irish poet and translator Seamus Heaney had ruled himself out for the post. Breaking with the tradition of the laureate retaining the post for life, Motion stipulated that he would stay for only ten years. The yearly stipend of £200 was increased to £5,000 and he received the customary butt of sack. He wanted to write "poems about things in the news, and commissions from people or organisations involved with ordinary life", rather than be seen as a "courtier". So, he wrote "for the TUC about liberty, about homelessness for the Salvation Army, about bullying for ChildLine, about the foot and mouth outbreak for the Today programme, about the Paddington rail disaster, the 11 September attacks and Harry Patch for the BBC, and more recently about shell shock for the charity Combat Stress, and climate change for the song cycle he finished for Cambridge University with Peter Maxwell Davies."

On 14 March 2002, as part of the "Re-weaving Rainbows" event of National Science Week 2002, Motion unveiled a blue plaque on the front wall of 28 St Thomas Street, Southwark, to commemorate the sharing of lodgings there by John Keats and Henry Stephens while they were medical students at Guy's and St Thomas' Hospital in 1815–16.

In 2003, Motion wrote Regime change, a poem in protest at the Invasion of Iraq from the point of view of Death walking the streets during the conflict, and in 2005, "Spring Wedding" in honour of the wedding of the Prince of Wales to Camilla Parker Bowles. Commissioned to write in the honour of 109-year-old Harry Patch, the last surviving "Tommy" to have fought in the First World War, Motion composed a five-part poem, read and received by Patch at the Bishop's Palace in Wells in 2008.

As laureate, he also founded the Poetry Archive, an on-line library of historic and contemporary recordings of poets reciting their own work.

Motion remarked that he found some of the duties attendant to the post of poet laureate difficult and onerous and that the appointment had been "very, very damaging to [his] work". The appointment of Motion met with criticism from some quarters. As he prepared to stand down from the job, Motion published an article in The Guardian that concluded: "To have had 10 years working as laureate has been remarkable. Sometimes it's been remarkably difficult, the laureate has to take a lot of flak, one way or another. More often it has been remarkably fulfilling. I'm glad I did it, and I'm glad I'm giving it up – especially since I mean to continue working for poetry."

Motion spent his last day as Poet Laureate holding a creative writing class at his alma mater, Radley College, before giving a poetry reading and thanking Peter Way, the man who taught him English at Radley, for making him who he was. Carol Ann Duffy succeeded him as Poet Laureate on 1 May 2009.

=== Post-laureateship ===
Motion is chairman of the Arts Council of England's literature panel (appointed 1996) and is also a Fellow of the Royal Society of Literature. In 2003, he became professor of creative writing at Royal Holloway, University of London. Since July 2009, Motion has been Chairman of the Museums, Libraries and Archives Council (MLA) appointed by the Department for Culture, Media and Sport. He is also a vice-president of the Friends of the British Library, a charity which provides funding support to the British Library. He was knighted in the 2009 Queen's Birthday Honours list. He has been a member of English Heritage's Blue Plaques Panel since 2008.

Motion was selected as jury chair for the Man Booker Prize 2010 and in March 2010, he announced that he was working with publishers Jonathan Cape on a sequel to Robert Louis Stevenson's Treasure Island. Entitled Silver, the story is set a generation on from the original book and was published in March 2012. In July 2010, Motion returned to Kingston-upon-Hull for the annual Humber Mouth literature festival and taking part in the Larkin 25 festival commemorating the 25th anniversary of Philip Larkin's death. In his capacity as Larkin's biographer and as a former lecturer in English at the University of Hull, Motion named an East Yorkshire Motor Services bus Philip Larkin. Motion's debut play Incoming, about the war in Afghanistan, premièred at the High Tides Festival in Halesworth, Suffolk, in May 2011. Motion also featured in Jamie's Dream School in 2011 as the poetry teacher.

In June 2012, he became the President of the Campaign to Protect Rural England. In March 2014, he was elected an Honorary Fellow at Homerton College, Cambridge.

Motion won the 2015 Ted Hughes Award for new work in poetry for the radio programme Coming Home. The production featured poetry by Motion based on recordings he made of British soldiers returning from the wars in Iraq and Afghanistan.

In 2017, Motion moved to Baltimore, Maryland, to take up a post at the Writing Seminars as a Homewood Professor of the Arts at Johns Hopkins University.

== Work ==
Motion has said of himself: "My wish to write a poem is inseparable from my wish to explain something to myself." His work combines lyrical and narrative aspects in a "postmodern-romantic sensibility". Motion says that he aims to write in clear language without tricks.

The Independent describes the stalwart poet as the "charming and tireless defender of the art form". Motion has won the Arvon Prize, the John Llewellyn Rhys Prize, Eric Gregory Award, Whitbread Prize for Biography and the Dylan Thomas Prize.

Motion took part in the Bush Theatre's 2011 project Sixty-Six Books, writing and performing a piece based upon a book of the King James Bible.

== Personal life ==
Motion's marriage to Joanna Powell ended in 1983. He was married to Jan Dalley from 1985 to 2009, divorcing after a seven-year separation. They had one son born in 1986 and twins, a son and a daughter, born in 1988. In 2010, he married Kyeong-Soo Kim. He currently lives part of the year in Baltimore, Maryland, in the United States.

== Selected honours and awards ==
- 1975: won the Newdigate prize for Oxford undergraduate poetry
- 1976: Eric Gregory Award
- 1981: wins Arvon Foundation's International Poetry Competition with The Letter
- 1984: John Llewellyn Rhys Prize for Dangerous Play: Poems 1974–1984
- 1987: Somerset Maugham Award for The Lamberts
- 1987: Dylan Thomas Prize for Natural Causes
- 1999: appointed Poet Laureate for ten years
- 1994: Philip Larkin: A Writer’s Life, Whitbread Prize for Biography
- 2009: Knight Bachelor
- 2014: Wilfred Owen Poetry Award

== Bibliography ==
=== Poetry collections ===
- 1978: The Pleasure Steamers, Carcanet
- 1981: Independence, Salamander Press
- 1983: Secret Narratives, Salamander Press
- 1984: Dangerous Play: Poems 1974–1984, Salamander Press / Penguin
- 1987: Natural Causes, Chatto & Windus
- 1988: Two Poems, Words Ltd
- 1991: Love in a Life, Faber and Faber
- 1994: The Price of Everything, Faber and Faber
- 1997: Salt Water, Faber and Faber
- 1998: Selected Poems 1976–1997, Faber and Faber
- 2001: A Long Story, The Old School Press
- 2002: Public Property, Faber and Faber
- 2009: The Cinder Path, Faber and Faber
- 2012: The Customs House, Faber and Faber
- 2015: Peace Talks, Faber and Faber
- 2015: Coming Home, Fine Press Poetry
- 2017: Coming in to Land: Selected Poems, 1975–2015, Ecco Press
- 2018: Essex Clay, Faber and Faber
- 2020: Randomly Moving Particles, Faber and Faber
- 2026: Gravity Archives, Faber and Faber

=== Criticism ===
- 1980: The Poetry of Edward Thomas. Routledge & Kegan Paul
- 1982: Philip Larkin. (Contemporary Writers series) Methuen
- 1986: Elizabeth Bishop. (Chatterton Lectures on an English Poet)
- 1998: Sarah Raphael: Strip!. Marlborough Fine Art (London)
- 2008: Ways of Life: On Places, Painters and Poets. Faber and Faber

=== Biography ===
- 1986: The Lamberts: George, Constant and Kit. Chatto & Windus
- 1993: Philip Larkin: A Writer's Life. Faber and Faber
- 1997: Keats: A Biography. Faber and Faber

=== Memoirs ===
- 2006: In the Blood: A Memoir of my Childhood. Faber and Faber

=== Fiction ===
- 1989: The Pale Companion. Penguin
- 1991: Famous for the Creatures. Viking
- 2003: The Invention of Dr Cake. Faber and Faber
- 2000: Wainewright the Poisoner: The Confessions of Thomas Griffiths Wainewright (biographical nove])
- 2012: Silver. Jonathan Cape
- 2015: The New World. Crown

Non-profit organization positions
Preceded by Bill Bryson	President of the Campaign to Protect Rural England; 2012–2016	Succeeded by Emma Bridgewater
