= William Hanks =

American linguist and anthropologist

William F. Hanks (born 1952) is an American linguist and anthropologist who has done influential work in linguistic anthropology describing the uses of deixis and indexicality in the Yucatec Maya language. He holds the Distinguished Chair in Linguistic Anthropology at the University of California Berkeley. Hanks earned his undergraduate degree from Georgetown University. A student of Michael Silverstein, he received his Ph.D. in anthropology and linguistics at the University of Chicago. He is also known for introducing the practice theory of Pierre Bourdieu to the study of communicative practices. He received the Edward Sapir award of the American Anthropological Association for his 2010 monograph "Converting Words" about the colonial period society of Yucatán. In addition to the University of Chicago, he also held a faculty position at Northwestern University before receiving his chair at the University of California at Berkeley.

== Partial bibliography ==
- 2009. Converting words: Maya in the age of the cross. University of California Press.
- 1999. Intertexts, Writings on Language, Utterance and Context. Denver: Rowman and Littlefield.
- 1995. Language and Communicative Practices. Series Critical Essays in Anthropology. Boulder: Westview Press.
- 1990. Referential Practice, Language and Lived Space among the Maya. Chicago: The University of Chicago Press.
- 1992. The Indexical Ground of Deictic Reference. In Rethinking Context, Language as an Interactive Phenomenon. A. Duranti and C. Goodwin, eds. pp. 43–77. Cambridge University Press.
