= Language Documentation & Conservation =

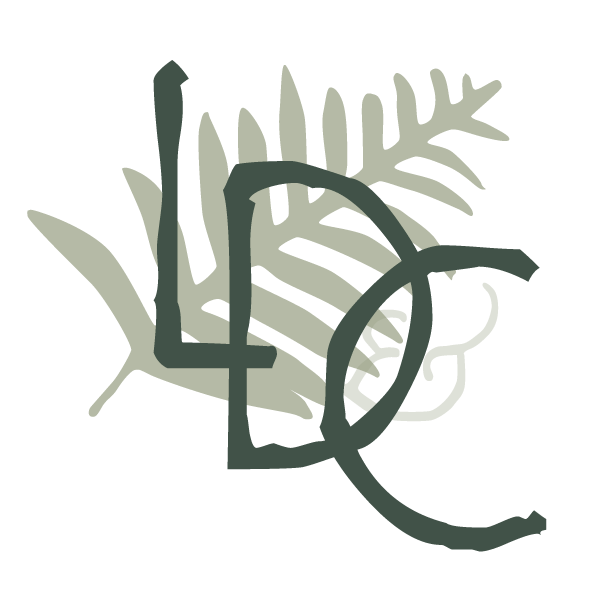
- Logo of LD&C.
- Discipline: Linguistics
- Language: English
- Edited by: Racquel-María Sapién

Publication details
- History: 2007–present
- Publisher: University of Hawaii Press (United States)
- Frequency: Upon acceptance
- Open access: Yes
- License: CC-by-SA

Standard abbreviations
- ISO 4: Lang. Doc. Conserv.

Indexing
- ISSN: 1934-5275
- OCLC no.: 74826790

Links
- Journal homepage

Language Documentation & Conservation is a peer-reviewed open-access academic journal covering all topics related to language documentation and conservation, including the goals of data management, field-work methods, ethics, orthography design, reference grammar design, lexicography, methods of assessing ethnolinguistic vitality, archiving matters, language planning, areal survey reports, short field reports on underdocumented or endangered languages, reports on language maintenance, preservation, and revitalization efforts, plus reviews of software, hardware, and books.

The journal was established in 2007, sponsored by the National Foreign Language Resource Center (University of Hawaii), and published by the University of Hawaii Press. The founding editor-in-chief was Kenneth L. Rehg (University of Hawaii). From 2011 to 2021, the editor was Nicholas Thieberger (University of Melbourne). Since 2022, the editor is Racquel-María Sapién, University of Oklahoma, U.S.

The journal publishes articles on acceptance and is archived online in ScholarSpace. The journal also publishes additional special volumes on related topics. It is indexed in Linguistics and Language Behavior Abstracts and the MLA International Bibliography.
