= BBC Sound Archive =

UK archive

The BBC Sound Archive is a collection of audio recordings maintained by the BBC and founded in 1936. Its recordings date back to the late 19th century and include many rare items, including contemporary speeches by public and political figures, folk music, British dialects and sound effects.

== Foundation and early years ==
The BBC began broadcasting in 1922 but nothing was recorded until ten years later. At that time, only one recording machine, a Blattnerphone, was available, so few programmes were recorded.

By 1936 a number of gramophone recordings had been made, and a temporary secretary, Marie Slocombe was given the task of sorting and disposing of them. However, noticing that some included speeches by George Bernard Shaw, H. G. Wells, Winston Churchill and others, she decided that they should be kept. With the then Head of Recorded Programmes, Lynton Fletcher, she continued maintaining the BBC's collection, as well as making recordings herself in the field, encouraging others to do so, and acquired Ludwig Koch's collection of birdsong recordings. By 1939 the collection had grown to 2,000 discs, including the voices of Hitler and Goebbels. This had increased to 7,000 by 1944 and in 1941 Slocombe had become Recorded Programmes Librarian, a title she held until her retirement in 1972.

== Coverage, access and development ==
The archive includes material dating back to the 19th century, including about 200 wax cylinders, one of which is an 1890 recording of Florence Nightingale. The collection has continued to grow over the years, and from 1998 was regularly drawn on for the BBC Radio 4 series The Archive Hour. In 2007 a limited sample was made available online as part of the BBC Archive Trial.

Resource constraints mean that the BBC has been selective in maintaining items in the archive. About 66% of radio output is now archived, the collection's recordings are of around 350,000 hours in total duration. Automatically available are "live major news sequence programmes, live music sessions and concerts, drama, arts, features, events, light entertainment, science and education programmes", while "DJ shows with commercially recorded music, local radio and World Service output" are less likely to be retained.

Access to part of the archive is made available to researchers and the public through the British Library.

Technological advances have increasingly improved the durability of early recordings, requiring their translation into digital formats, and enhancements such as noise reduction.

== See also ==
- List of sound archives
