= Linda Barwick =

Australian musicologist

Linda Barwick AM FAHA
- Born: Linda Mary Barwick; 1954 (age 71–72)
- Awards: Sir Bernard Heinze Memorial Award (2024)

Academic background
- Education: Flinders University
- Thesis: Critical perspectives on oral song in performance : the case of Donna lombarda (1986)

Linda Mary Barwick AM FAHA (born 1954) is an Australian musicologist and professor emeritus at the Sydney Conservatorium of Music. Barwick has focused on researching Australian Indigenous music and the music of immigrant communities. She also works in the field of digital humanities, archiving recordings.

== Early life and education ==
Barwick was born Linda Mary Barwick in 1954. Early publications appeared under her married surname Linda Mary Bone She graduated with a BA (hons, 1980) and PhD (1986) from Flinders University. Her PhD thesis was titled "Critical perspectives on oral song in performance : the case of Donna lombarda" and was supervised by Antonio Comin and Catherine Ellis.

== Career ==
Following her PhD, Barwick moved to the University of New England, where she worked with Professor Catherine Ellis and began to study Australian Indigenous music and Aboriginal women's participation in it.

Based at the Sydney Conservatorium of Music, Barwick was co-founder and served as the first director of the Pacific and Regional Archive for Digital Sources in Endangered Cultures (PARADISEC) in 2003. As of June 2022 she is chair of the steering committee of PARADISEC.

In 1995 she co-edited a collection of essays titled The essence of singing and the substance of song recent responses to the Aboriginal performing arts and other essays in honour of Catherine Ellis.

Barwick was elected a Fellow of the Australian Academy of the Humanities in 2014. She was appointed a Member of the Order of Australia in the 2023 Australia Day Honours. In 2024 she was presented with the Sir Bernard Heinze Memorial Award.

== Selected publications ==
=== Books ===
- Marett, Allan; Barwick, Linda; Ford, Lysbeth Julie (2012), For the sake of a song : Wangga songmen and their repertories, Sydney University Press, ISBN 978-1-920899-75-2
- Harris, Amanda; Thieberger, Nicholas; Barwick, Linda, eds. (2015), Research, records and responsibility : ten years of PARADISEC, Sydney University Press, ISBN 978-1-74332-443-1
- Barwick, Linda; Green, Jenny; Vaarzon-Morel, Petronella, eds. (2020), Archival returns : Central Australia and beyond, Sydney University Press, ISBN 978-1-74332-672-5
