= Claire Moyse-Faurie =

French linguist (born 1949)

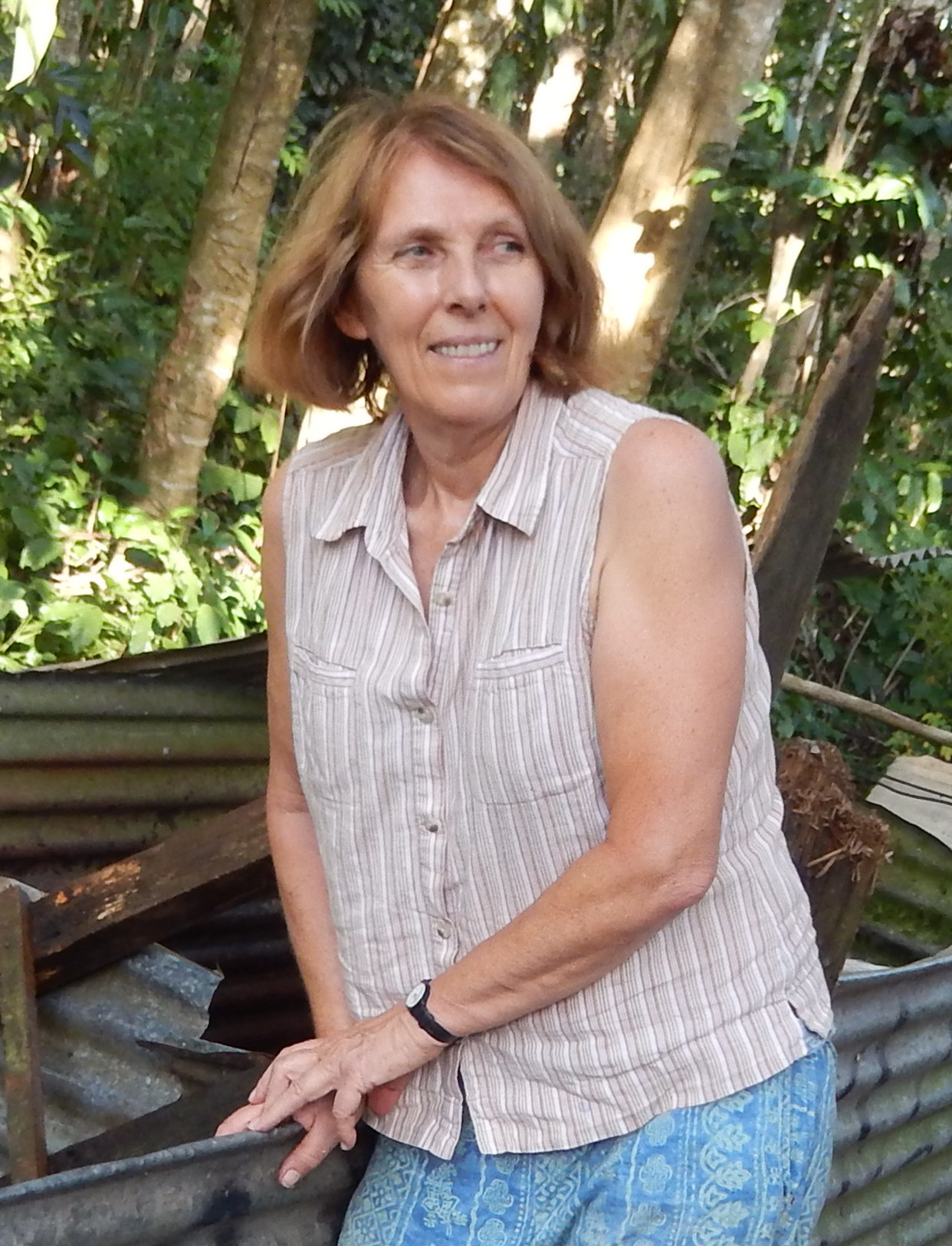
- Claire Moyse-Faurie in New Caledonia in 2014.

Claire Moyse-Faurie (born 7 October 1949) is a French linguist specializing in Oceanic languages, in particular the languages of Wallis and Futuna and of New Caledonia.

== Education, career and honours ==
Moyse-Faurie studied with the linguist André-Georges Haudricourt. After many years working at LACITO (CNRS) from 1980 onwards, including serving as its deputy director from 1992 to 1995, Moyse-Faurie became emeritus director of research at Lattice in 2021. She held a visiting position as professor at the University of New Caledonia in 2004, 2005, 2013, 2014 and 2015.

Moyse-Faurie was appointed Member of the Academia Europaea in 2016. She also served as President of the Société de Linguistique de Paris in 2012.

== Research ==
Alongside descriptive studies of Oceanic languages (Drehu, Xârâcùù, Xârâgurè, West Uvean, Haméa, East Futunan, East Uvean), Moyse-Faurie has worked on linguistic topics such as valency, nominalization, reflexives, reciprocals, grammaticalization, and linguistic typology. In 1982 she proposed an orthography for this language, which has subsequently been used in teaching; she also published a dictionary of Xârâcùù together with Marie-Adèle Néchérö-Jorédié in 1986.

== Selected publications ==
- Moyse-Faurie, Claire, & Marie-Adèle Néchérö-Jorédié. 1986. Dictionnaire Xârâcùù-Français (Nouvelle-Calédonie). Leuven: Peeters. ISBN 9782906341005
- Moyse-Faurie, Claire. 1993. Dictionnaire futunien-français: avec index français-futunien. Leuven: Peeters. ISBN 9782877230704
- Moyse-Faurie, Claire, & John Lynch. 2004. Coordination in Oceanic languages and Proto-Oceanic. In Martin Haspelmath (ed.), Coordinating constructions, 445–497. Amsterdam: John Benjamins. ISBN 9789027295248
- Kayser, Manfred, Silke Brauer, Richard Cordaux, Amanda Casto, Oscar Lao, Lev A. Zhivotovsky, Claire Moyse-Faurie, Robb B. Rutledge, Wulf Schiefenhoevel, David Gil, Alice A. Lin, Peter A. Underhill, Peter J. Oefner, Ronald J. Trent, & Mark Stoneking. 2006. Melanesian and Asian origins of Polynesians: mtDNA and Y chromosome gradients across the Pacific. Molecular Biology and Evolution 23 (11), 2234–2244. doi:10.1093/molbev/msl093
- Moyse-Faurie, Claire. 2008. Constructions expressing middle, reflexive and reciprocal situations in some Oceanic languages. In Ekkehard König & Volker Gast (eds.), Reciprocals and Reflexives: Theoretical and Typological Explorations, 105–168. Berlin: De Gruyter. ISBN 9783110199147
