= Kaipuleohone =

Digital ethnographic archive

Coordinates: 21.326518°N 157.815253°W

Kaipuleohone is a digital ethnographic archive that houses audio and visual files, photographs, as well as hundreds of textual materials such as notes, dictionaries, and transcriptions relating to small and endangered languages. The archive is stored in the ScholarSpace repository of the University of Hawai‘i at Mānoa and maintained by the Department of Linguistics of the University's College of Languages, Linguistics and Literature. Kaipuleohone was established by Nick Thieberger in 2008. It is a member of the Digital Endangered Languages and Musics Archiving Network (DELAMAN). The term kaipuleohone means 'gourd of sweet words' and symbolizes the impression of an accumulation of language material.

Kaipuleohone comprises several collections including Kaipuleohone Audio Files, the Bickerton Collection, the Blust Collection, the Bradshaw Collection, and the Sato Collection.

== See also ==
- Language Documentation & Conservation
- ScholarSpace
