= Digital Endangered Languages and Musics Archives Network =

International archival organization

Digital Endangered Languages and Musics Archives Network (DELAMAN)
- Founded: 2003
- Type: International umbrella organization
- Purpose: Preservation and archiving of endangered languages and cultural heritage
- Region served: Worldwide
- Members: Professional archives and repositories
- Website: www.delaman.org

The Digital Endangered Languages and Musics Archives Network (DELAMAN) is an international umbrella organization of archives dedicated to the long-term digital preservation of data pertaining to linguistic and cultural diversity. Established in 2003, the network coordinates efforts between repositories that store documentation of endangered languages and traditional music worldwide.

The network serves as a platform for establishing standards in archival practices and facilitating technical coordination among member institutions.

== History ==
DELAMAN was founded during a meeting at SOAS University of London in 2003, involving representatives from major language archives including AILLA (University of Texas at Austin), the Endangered Languages Archive (ELAR), and PARADISEC. The network was created to address the rapid increase in digital language documentation and the resulting need for a coordinated approach to metadata standards and technical interoperability between repositories.

In its early years, the network's development was supported by grants from the National Science Foundation (NSF) and the Volkswagen Foundation.

== Mission and activities ==
The primary goal of DELAMAN is to ensure that documentary materials (audio, video, and text) are preserved, discoverable, and accessible to both speaker communities and the scientific community. It operates as an international consortium that provides a forum for archive directors to discuss evolving standards in the field, in particular concerning metadata.

=== Standards and best practices ===
DELAMAN promotes the use of the Open Language Archives Community (OLAC) metadata standards. The network addresses professional challenges such as digital obsolescence, ethical management of sensitive cultural data, and the repatriation of digital materials to their communities of origin. In 2018, DELAMAN released a “Minimal Checklist for the Preservation of Digital Language Documentation Materials”.

=== DELAMAN Award ===
The network grants the DELAMAN Award to recognize outstanding documentary collections created by early-career researchers. The award evaluates the quality of archival deposits based on metadata richness and the accessibility of the collection for future research.

== Member archives ==
=== Full members ===
- AILLA, the Archive of the Indigenous Languages of Latin America
- Alaska Native Language Archive
- California Language Archive (at the University of California, Berkeley)
- CoRSAL (Computational Resource for South Asian Languages)
- ELAR, the Endangered Languages Archive at the Berlin-Brandenburg Academy of Sciences and Humanities
- Kaipuleohone (University of Hawaiʻi Digital Ethnographic Archive)
- Native American Languages Collection at the Sam Noble Museum of Natural History
- Pangloss Collection (hosted by CNRS)
- PARADISEC (Pacific and Regional Archive for Digital Sources in Endangered Cultures)
- SIL International Language and Culture Archives
- The Language Archive
- The Library of the American Philosophical Society (APS)
- World Oral Literature Project

== Reception and critiques ==
=== Maintenance over time ===
Research on the functionality of language archives has noted that it is sometimes unclear which archives within the OLAC and DELAMAN networks are actively maintained, particularly regarding their long-term support and backup protocols.

=== Data mobilization ===
From the perspective of computational linguistics, some critics have argued that DELAMAN member archives have historically focused more on data ingestion than on “mobilization”. This critique points to a lack of APIs or bulk download options, which can limit the large-scale use of archived materials for statistics-based linguistic research and applications.

== See also ==
- Language documentation
- Digital preservation
