= Documenting Endangered Languages =

The Documenting Endangered Languages (DEL) program is a joint effort between the National Science Foundation (NSF) and the National Endowment for the Humanities (NEH) to help fund fieldwork, research, and community activities that are involved in recording, documenting, and archiving endangered human languages. Linguists estimate that more than 3,000 of the 6,000-7,000 languages currently spoken will soon be extinct due to pressures preventing speakers from passing along knowledge of ancestral/traditional languages to children, and to speakers having fewer daily opportunities to use their languages. To address this issue, the NSF and NEH—in partnership with the Smithsonian Institution's National Museum of Natural History (NMNH) serving as a research host, but in a non-funding role—announced the first DEL awards in 2005, in an attempt to preserve records of endangered languages in use.

U.S.-based institutions that are eligible to apply for the grants include universities, colleges, tribal colleges and universities, tribal-serving institutions or tribal nations, and non-profit, non-academic institutions. Currently this program offers two subareas, one which provides funding opportunities via Senior Research Grants and Fellowships, and one that supports Doctoral Dissertation Research Improvement Grants for dissertation students.

The DEL program is part of a worldwide focus in the 21st century by funding agencies to support projects that work on recording and analyzing the linguistic knowledge of native speakers while these languages continue to be spoken, and to assist with documentation work within communities where languages are threatened.
