= PARADISEC =

Project supporting endangered languages and cultures of the Pacific

The Pacific and Regional Archive for Digital Sources in Endangered Cultures (PARADISEC) is a digital archive of records of some of the many small cultures and languages of the world. It was established in 2003 and they digitise reel-to-reel field tapes, have a mass data store and use international standards for metadata description. PARADISEC is part of the worldwide community of language archives (DELAMAN and the Open Language Archives Community). PARADISEC's main motivation is to ensure that unique recordings of small languages are preserved for the future, and that researchers consider the future accessibility of their materials for other researchers, community members, or anyone who has an interest in such materials.

== Advocacy ==
PARADISEC advocates for the importance of repositories for cultural heritage materials, and discipline-specific repositories. Distributed and accessible online archives enable members of speaker communities to access records made of the language and musical practices. This work aims to bridge the digital divide in a most practical way, building a repository with a simple ingestion system and an appropriate metadata schema to make it as easy as possible to add new items, and for them to be licensed and made accessible.

== Archive ==
The collection currently contains roughly 15,440 hours of archived audio materials representing more than 1,346 languages from around 100 countries. This is supplemented by images, videos and text. Altogether, the archive contains some 202 terabytes of data in more than 409,000 individual files (as of January 2023).

The database of archived materials can be freely searched via the Open Languages Archives Community. Direct access to archived recordings requires free registration and sometimes needs permission as specified by the depositor.

== File types ==
For secure archiving of audio files complete with metadata headers, PARADISEC uses the DOBBIN system, developed by Cube-Tec, which conforms to the BWF specifications of the European Broadcast Union (EBU). BWF files are archived with a digitally sealed 'header' comprising metadata exported from the PARADISEC catalogue. This sealed header also acts as a security device and prevents the archived BWF from any unauthorised edits, thus preserving the audio signal for posterity. It is also standard practice to produce smaller, more easily transported mp3 copies of each BWF, for the purpose of access. These too, are archived with the master BWF copies.

== Digitisation ==
A large part of the project is the digitisation of valuable analogue recordings of languages and cultures from the Pacific region that will otherwise deteriorate and become unreadable. Researchers whose materials are represented in these collections include Arthur Capell, Stephen Wurm, Clemens Voorhoeve and Terry Crowley. These recordings may be stored on a variety of formats, but are mainly cassette tapes and reel-to-reel tapes. Analogue recordings are digitised at the international archive standard for PCM audio files of 24-bit resolution and a sample rate of 96 kHz.

== Affiliations ==
PARADISEC is funded by a consortium of three Australian universities, including the University of Sydney, University of Melbourne and the Australian National University, as well as the Australian Research Council. PARADISEC's main office and primary ingestion stations are located at the University of Sydney in the Sydney Conservatorium of Music, and secondary offices, comprising further ingestion stations, are situated at the University of Melbourne and the Australian National University. The archive is currently headed by Nicholas Thieberger (Melbourne) and Amanda Harris (Sydney).

== Other information ==
- PARADISEC is actively involved in training and supporting language workers and regularly provides recording equipment and advice to researchers and students undertaking fieldwork. They have held a number of field recording and sustainable data workshops and conferences, in the interests of ensuring recordings are made with archiving in mind.
- PARADISEC is a project to digitise endangered ethnographic recordings.
- PARADISEC in 2019 In 2019 received the World Data System data seal
- PARADISEC was in 2013 inscribed into the Australian Register of the UNESCO Memory of the World Program.
- PARADISEC is a CoreTrustSeal certified repository, and a regular member of the International Science Council's World Data System.
- In 2023 PARADISEC's founding Director Linda Barwick became Member of the Order of Australia (AM) for significant service to the preservation and digitisation of cultural heritage recordings.
