= Orca Bay =

Orca Bay may refer to:

- Orca Bay Sports and Entertainment, an ice hockey company which became Canucks Sports and Entertainment in 2008
- Orca Bay, Alaska, near Hawkins Island
- Orca Inlet, Alaska, on the east and south of Hawkins Island
