= National Register of Historic Places listings in Chugach Census Area, Alaska =

Location of the Valdez-Cordova Census Area in Alaska

This is a list of the National Register of Historic Places listings in Chugach Census Area, Alaska.

This is intended to be a complete list of the properties and districts on the National Register of Historic Places in Chugach Census Area, Alaska, United States. The locations of National Register properties and districts for which the latitude and longitude coordinates are included below, may be seen in a Google map.

There are ten properties and districts listed on the National Register in the census area, including two National Historic Landmarks. Another property was once listed but has been removed.

This National Park Service list is complete through NPS recent listings posted October 30, 2026.

== Current listings ==
	Name on the Register	Image	Date listed	Location	City or town	Description
1	Bering Expedition Landing Site	Bering Expedition Landing Site	July 20, 1977 (#77001542)	On Kayak Island; 59°53′40″N 144°29′08″W	Katalla	
2	Cape Hinchinbrook Light Station	Cape Hinchinbrook Light Station	July 29, 2005 (#05000728)	Southwestern end of Hinchinbrook Island; 60°14′14″N 146°38′48″W	Cordova	
3	Cape St. Elias Lighthouse	Cape St. Elias Lighthouse	December 18, 1975 (#75002157)	Southwestern end of Kayak Island; 59°47′54″N 144°35′56″W	Katalla	
4	Chilkat Oil Company Refinery Site		September 6, 1974 (#74002320)	Along Katalla Slough, about 2.7 miles (4.3 km) east of Katalla; 60°11′15″N 144°27′02″W	Katalla	
5	Cordova Post Office and Courthouse	Cordova Post Office and Courthouse	August 2, 1977 (#77001571)	612 2nd Street; 60°32′39″N 145°45′24″W	Cordova	
6	Million Dollar Bridge	Million Dollar Bridge	March 31, 2000 (#00000293)	Mile 48 of Copper River Highway, about 35 miles (56 km) northeast of Cordova; 60°40′23″N 144°44′45″W	Cordova	
7	Palugvik Archeological District		October 15, 1966 (#66000957)	Hawkins Island	Cordova	
8	Pioneer Igloo Hall Number 19		August 15, 2012 (#12000492)	621 1st Street; 60°32′38″N 145°45′33″W	Cordova	
9	Red Dragon Historic District	Red Dragon Historic District	August 31, 1982 (#82004899)	Roughly bounded by Lake Avenue, 1st Street and 2nd Street; 60°32′32″N 145°45′28″W	Cordova	
10	St. Michael the Archangel Church	St. Michael the Archangel Church	June 6, 1980 (#80004578)	Southern side of Lake Avenue, between 9th Street and Birch Street; 60°32′33″N 145°44′40″W	Cordova	

== Former listings ==
	Name on the Register	Image	Date listed	Date removed	Location	City or town	Description
1	Reception Building		April 9, 1980 (#80004566)	April 26, 2019	Northeastern corner of 2nd Street and Browning Avenue; 60°32′41″N 145°45′24″W	Cordova	

== See also ==
- List of National Historic Landmarks in Alaska
- National Register of Historic Places listings in Alaska
