= Kayak Island =

- Bering Expedition Landing Site (Eyak: Qe'yiłteh)
- U.S. National Register of Historic Places
- U.S. National Historic Landmark
- Alaska Heritage Resources Survey
- Location within Alaska
- Location: Katalla, Alaska
- Coordinates: 59°53′40″N 144°29′08″W
- Built: 1741
- NRHP reference No.: 77001542
- AHRS No.: XMI-005

Significant dates
- Added to NRHP: July 20, 1977
- Designated NHL: June 2, 1978
- Designated AHRS: February 2, 1975

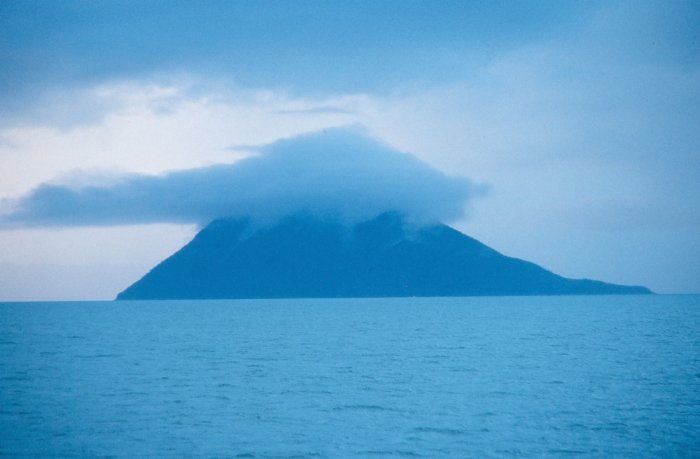
Kayak Island - Cape St. Elias

Kayak Island (Eyak: Qe'yiłteh), is located in the Gulf of Alaska, 100 km (62 mi) SE of Cordova, Alaska Malaspina Coastal Plain, on the eastern edge of Chugach National Forest. It has a land area of 73.695 km^{2} (28.454 sq mi) and no population. It is significant as the first place in Alaska a non-native set foot, and thus chosen in 1978 for the location of the commemorative Bering Expedition Landing Site.

Vitus Bering himself never went ashore. On July 20, 1741, the Bering Expedition's German naturalist George Steller landed with a watering party at a stream-head now known as the Watering Place. Steller, who in addition to being the first non-native to walk on Alaskan ground, was the first scientist to study Alaskan human, plant and animal life. Steller walked about half a mile along the beach before encountering signs of people - scraps of fish, smoldering fire. Going further, Steller came upon a cellar two fathoms deep from which he took two bundles of fish, a fire drill, arrows, tinder, and thongs of seaweed, bark, and grass, which he sent back to the ship. From there he climbed the rise what is now known as Steller Hill, before returning to the ship before dark. He wanted to stay another day, but Bering was in a hurry to leave. In 1975, a forestry official called it the "discovery point of Alaska", and The Bering Expedition Landing Site was declared a National Historic Landmark in 1978.

The island was named "Kayak" in 1826 by Lt. Sarychev of the Russian Navy, because of the fancied resemblance of its outline to the Eskimo skin canoe.

Captain James Cook visited the island on May 12, 1778, and left a bottle at the base of a prominent tree, containing a slip of paper and two small pieces of silver given to him by Richard Kaye, the chaplain of King George III. The 1779 expedition of Spanish explorer Ignacio de Arteaga y Bazán sighted the island about July 16, the feast day of Our Lady of Mt. Carmel (or Carmen), and so he named it "Nuestra Señora del Carmen" or "Isla del Carmen".

Cape Saint Elias is located on the southwest end of the island. Mount Saint Elias—about 115 miles to the ENE, and at 18,009 feet (5,489 m) the second highest mountain in both the United States and Canada—was likely named after this cape. The cape is also the site of Alaska's first confirmed tornado, which caused minor damage to the area on November 4, 1959. It was the 50th and last state to confirm their first tornado since 1950.

The Cape St. Elias Light is an important aid-to-navigation located on the island.

The bottle, paper and silver Captain Cook left on Kayak Island remain undiscovered.

== See also ==
- List of National Historic Landmarks in Alaska
- National Register of Historic Places listings in Chugach Census Area, Alaska
