= Palugvik Site =

- U.S. National Register of Historic Places
- U.S. National Historic Landmark
- Alaska Heritage Resources Survey
- Location: Address restricted, Hawkins Island
- Nearest city: Cordova, Alaska
- NRHP reference No.: 66000957
- AHRS No.: COR-001

Significant dates
- Added to NRHP: October 15, 1966
- Designated NHL: December 29, 1962

The Palugvik Site, also known as Palugvik Archeological District, is an archaeological site on Hawkins Island in Prince William Sound, near Cordova, Alaska, within Chugach National Forest. The site, first excavated in 1930, was the first to provide a view of prehistoric human habitation in Prince William Sound, the ancestral home of the Chugach people, and is one of the two primary sites for identifying the sequence of occupation in the area. The site was declared a National Historic Landmark in 1962, and listed on the National Register of Historic Places in 1966.

== Description ==
The Palugvik site is located on the rocky shore of Hawkins Island, just west of the city of Cordova. The major feature of the site is a shell midden, and was at a somewhat higher elevation at the time of its human occupation. Since that time, the site has subsided, and was recorded in the 1960s as being about 30 centimetres (12 in) below the mean high tide level for the area.

The first major archaeological survey of Prince William Sound was conducted in the 1930s by pioneering archaeologist Frederica de Laguna, at which time she led a major excavation at Palugvik. The shell midden, when first examined, measured about 16 metres (52 ft) by 32 metres (105 ft), with a deposit depth of 180 centimetres (71 in) to 240 centimetres (94 in), but this size has been greatly reduced due to erosion. The site also includes fragmented remnants of a residence, burial sites, and other artifacts. The evidence gathered dates the site from c. 500 BCE to the European contact period. The 1930 excavations yielded about 1100 artifacts. It also yielded information about the diet and hunting habits of the inhabitants, which including a significant marine diet of fish, several species of whale, as well as land-based fauna including marmot.

== See also ==
- List of National Historic Landmarks in Alaska
- National Register of Historic Places listings in Chugach Census Area, Alaska
