= Cape Saint Elias =

Headland in Alaska, United States

Coordinates: 59°48′27″N 144°35′12″W

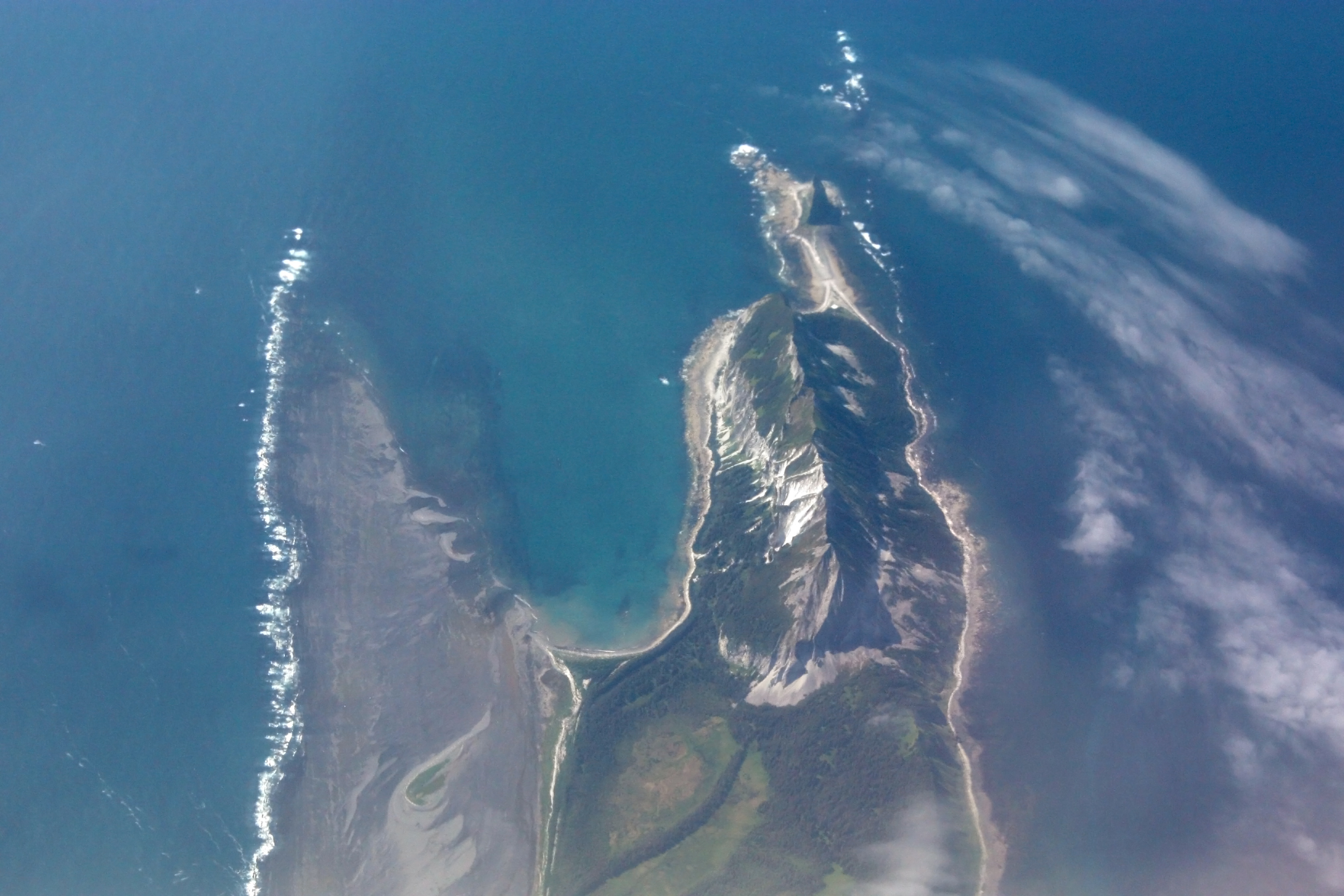
Aerial view from the northeast of Cape St. Elias and Pinnacle Rock (upper right)

Cape Saint Elias is a cape in the U.S. state of Alaska. It is located at the southwest end of Kayak Island, 104 km (65 mi) southeast of Cordova. It is commonly believed that Mount Saint Elias, the second highest mountain in the United States and Canada, is named for this landform.

The cape was named by Danish-born Russian explorer Vitus Bering on July 20, 1741, for Arab-born Elias I of Jerusalem, whose saint's day, (Eastern Orthodox liturgics), is July 20. This feature was also called "Santa Rosa" in 1779 by Don Ignacio Artega, "Español" in 1791 by Alessandro Malaspina, and "Punta de Canas," meaning "point of reeds," in 1796, by T.M. Lopez. George Vancouver named it "Hamond Point" in 1794 for Sir Andrew Snape Hamond.

In October 1913, Congress allocated $115,000 to construct a lighthouse on the cape. Construction occurred from 1915 through 1916 and a third order Fresnel Lens was put in place. At the time, this was the second such facility in Alaska.

The cape is also the site of Alaska's first confirmed tornado, which caused minor damage to the area on November 4, 1959. It was the 50th and last state to confirm their first tornado since 1950.

== Climate ==
Cape Saint Elias has a subpolar oceanic climate (Köppen: Cfc).

Climate data for Cape St. Elias Light
Month	Jan	Feb	Mar	Apr	May	Jun	Jul	Aug	Sep	Oct	Nov	Dec	Year
Record high °F (°C)	49 (9)	51 (11)	62 (17)	65 (18)	74 (23)	71 (22)	78 (26)	76 (24)	75 (24)	65 (18)	55 (13)	51 (11)	78 (26)
Mean maximum °F (°C)	42.8 (6.0)	43.1 (6.2)	46.7 (8.2)	51.3 (10.7)	58.8 (14.9)	63.3 (17.4)	67.9 (19.9)	66.5 (19.2)	63.1 (17.3)	55.3 (12.9)	48.1 (8.9)	44.1 (6.7)	69.3 (20.7)
Mean daily maximum °F (°C)	34.6 (1.4)	36.6 (2.6)	37.2 (2.9)	42.6 (5.9)	48.0 (8.9)	53.6 (12.0)	57.7 (14.3)	58.3 (14.6)	55.2 (12.9)	47.6 (8.7)	40.8 (4.9)	36.7 (2.6)	45.7 (7.6)
Daily mean °F (°C)	31.0 (−0.6)	33.2 (0.7)	33.4 (0.8)	38.3 (3.5)	43.8 (6.6)	49.6 (9.8)	53.7 (12.1)	54.5 (12.5)	51.0 (10.6)	43.4 (6.3)	37.2 (2.9)	33.2 (0.7)	41.9 (5.5)
Mean daily minimum °F (°C)	27.4 (−2.6)	29.8 (−1.2)	29.5 (−1.4)	33.9 (1.1)	39.7 (4.3)	45.5 (7.5)	49.7 (9.8)	50.7 (10.4)	46.9 (8.3)	39.2 (4.0)	33.7 (0.9)	29.8 (−1.2)	38.0 (3.3)
Mean minimum °F (°C)	16.7 (−8.5)	18.8 (−7.3)	19.4 (−7.0)	28.3 (−2.1)	34.5 (1.4)	41.1 (5.1)	45.3 (7.4)	46.3 (7.9)	40.3 (4.6)	32.0 (0.0)	23.9 (−4.5)	19.4 (−7.0)	12.5 (−10.8)
Record low °F (°C)	4 (−16)	1 (−17)	8 (−13)	17 (−8)	25 (−4)	36 (2)	30 (−1)	33 (1)	23 (−5)	13 (−11)	12 (−11)	0 (−18)	0 (−18)
Average precipitation inches (mm)	7.43 (189)	7.12 (181)	6.68 (170)	6.15 (156)	6.00 (152)	4.08 (104)	7.09 (180)	9.66 (245)	12.00 (305)	12.41 (315)	9.58 (243)	9.70 (246)	97.90 (2,487)
Average snowfall inches (cm)	22.1 (56)	18.6 (47)	13.2 (34)	4.3 (11)	0.2 (0.51)	0.0 (0.0)	0.0 (0.0)	0.0 (0.0)	0.0 (0.0)	1.6 (4.1)	7.1 (18)	19.7 (50)	86.8 (220)
Source: WRCC
