= Chilkat Oil Company Refinery Site =

- U.S. National Register of Historic Places
- Alaska Heritage Resources Survey
- Location within Alaska
- Location: Along Katalla Slough, about 2.7 miles (4.3 km) east of Katalla
- Nearest city: Katalla, Alaska
- Coordinates: 60°11′15″N 144°27′02″W
- Area: 10 acres (4.0 ha)
- NRHP reference No.: 74002320
- AHRS No.: COR-004
- Added to NRHP: September 6, 1974

The Chilkat Oil Company Refinery Site is a historic industrial site near the ghost town of Katalla, Alaska. It is located at the head of Katalla Slough, an arm of Katalla Bay, and about 20 miles (32 km) southeast of the mouth of the Copper River. The site consists of the ruined remnants of Alaska's first petroleum refinery, which operated from roughly 1911 until 1933, when it was partially destroyed by fire and abandoned. Oil had been discovered in Katalla Bay as early as 1902, and the company was formed to exploit the resource, reportedly producing more than 50,000 gallons of gasoline in 1921. Facilities at the site included a warehouse, tank house, running house, coal house, condensing house, and residence, all of which were reported to be in ruins in 1972.

The site was listed on the National Register of Historic Places in 1974.

== See also ==
- National Register of Historic Places listings in Chugach Census Area, Alaska
