= National Register of Historic Places listings in Valdez–Cordova Census Area, Alaska =

The Valdez-Cordova Census Area, Alaska, was divided in 2019. See:

- National Register of Historic Places listings in Chugach Census Area, Alaska
- National Register of Historic Places listings in Copper River Census Area, Alaska
