= Orca Bay (Alaska) =

Bay in Alaska, United States

Coordinates: 60°34′43″N 146°12′23″W

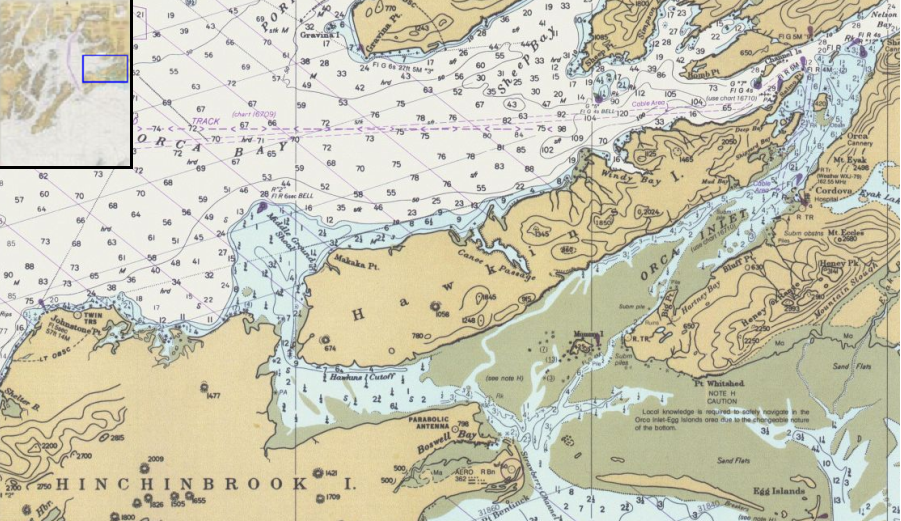
Orca Bay and Orca Inlet surround Hawkins Island, on the east side of Prince William Sound.

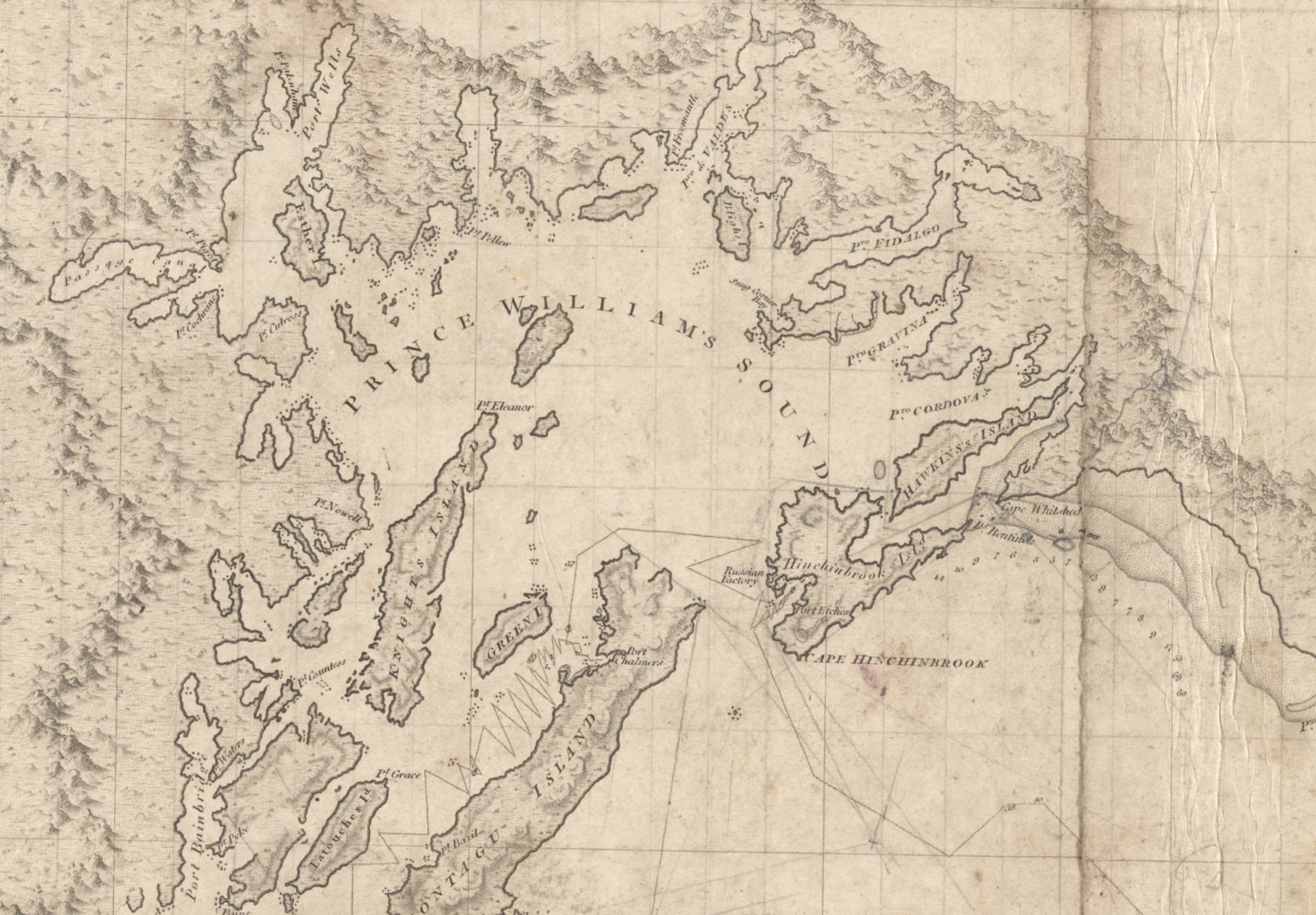
A chart of Prince William Sound from 1798 showing Orca Bay with its original name Puerto Córdova.

Orca Bay is a bay in Prince William Sound, Alaska, United States.

Orca Bay is on the north west and west sides of Hawkins Island, extending westward to Johnstone Point of Hinchenbrook Island. Its northwestern corner is demarcated by Knowles Head, between Port Gravina and Fidalgo Bay on the mainland. Its eastern end can be reached from the port of Cordova, Alaska on Orca Inlet. According to the US Board on Geographic Names, Orca Bay was named for the Orca salmon cannery of the Pacific Steam Whaling Company, which operated on the southeast shore of Orca Inlet and in turn was named for that company's ship Orca. Ultimately the name is derived from the orca or killer whale.

The bay was named Puerto Córdova by the Spanish explorer Salvador Fidalgo, in 1790, with the English name “Cordova Bay” marked on charts. It was renamed by the early twentieth century, to avoid confusion with Cordova Bay in Dixon Entrance, at the eastern extreme of the Gulf of Alaska.

The United States Navy seaplane tender USS Orca (AVP-49), in commission from 1944 to 1947 and from 1951 to 1960, was named for Orca Bay.

== See also ==
- Orca Inlet, on the east and south sides of Hawkins Island
