= St. Michael the Archangel Church (Cordova, Alaska) =

Historic church in Alaska, United States

- U.S. National Register of Historic Places
- Alaska Heritage Resources Survey
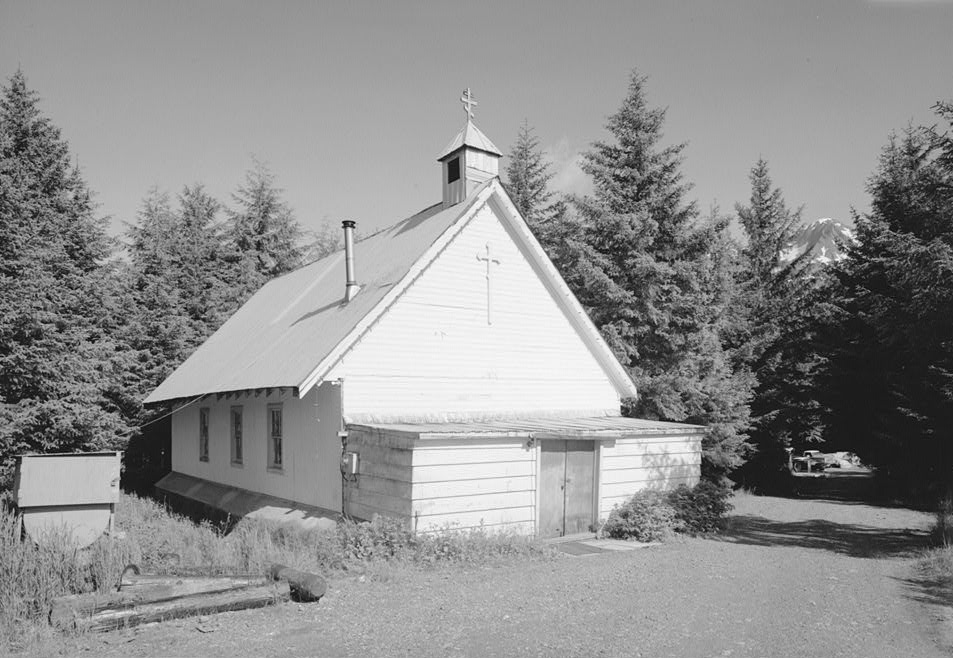

- Location within Alaska
- Location: Southern side of Lake Avenue, between 9th Street and Birch Street, Cordova, Alaska
- Coordinates: 60°32′33″N 145°44′40″W
- Area: less than one acre
- Built: 1925
- MPS: Russian Orthodox Church Buildings and Sites TR
- NRHP reference No.: 80004578
- AHRS No.: COR-021

Significant dates
- Added to NRHP: June 6, 1980
- Designated AHRS: May 18, 1973

St. Michael the Archangel Church is a historic Russian Orthodox church along Lake Avenue, in Cordova, Alaska. It is now under the Diocese of Alaska of the Orthodox Church in America.

It is a rectangular wood-frame structure with a moderately pitched roof, and a small entrance vestibule whose roof echoes the main roof line. The exterior is largely unadorned, owing to frequent windy conditions in the area. It was built in 1925 and has a modest appearance, in the generally simple style of the earlier Russian Orthodox church at Belkofski. The church interior was completely rebuilt and modernized in the 1970s.

The church was added to the National Register of Historic Places in 1980.

== See also ==
- National Register of Historic Places listings in Chugach Census Area, Alaska
