= Tornadoes of 1959 =

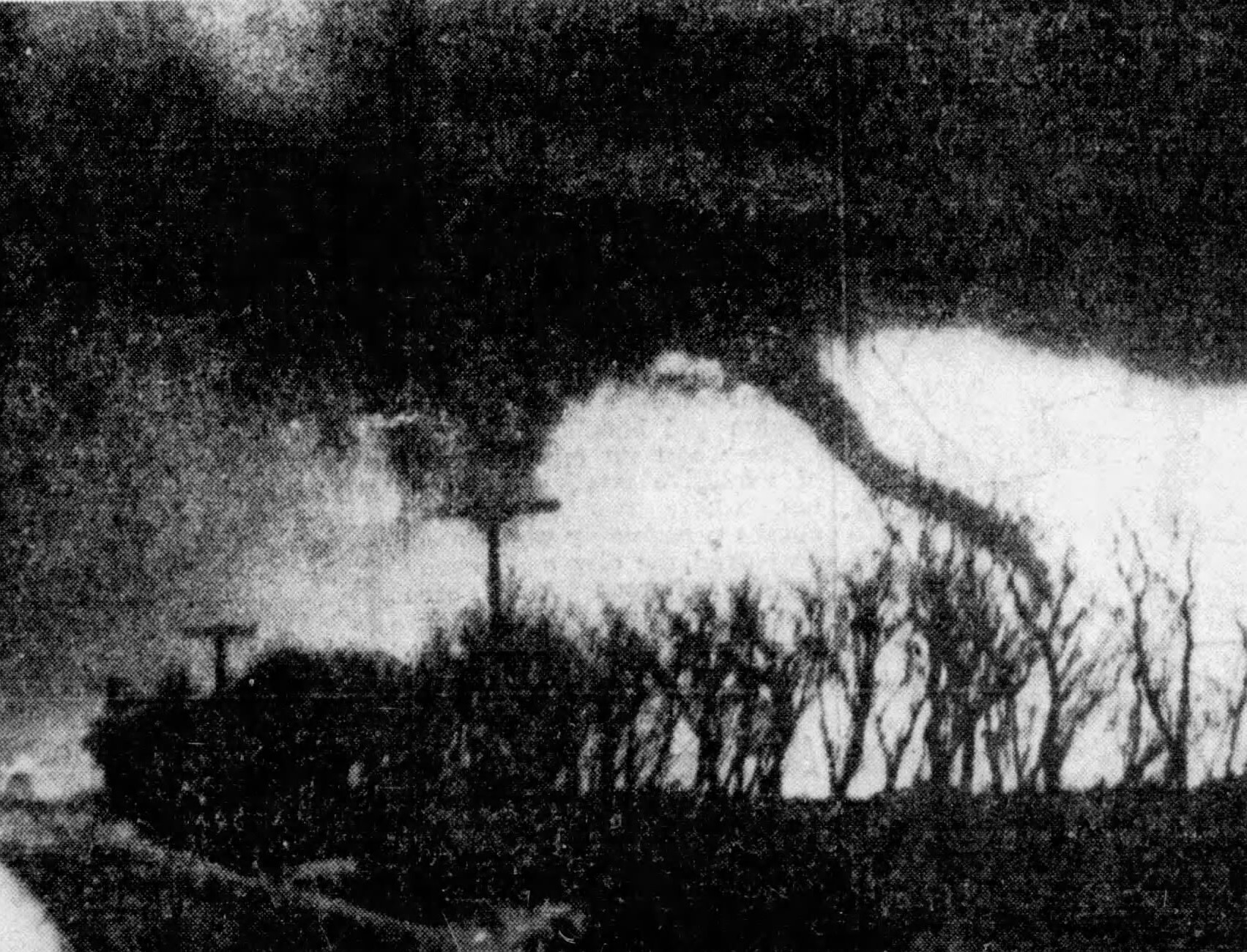
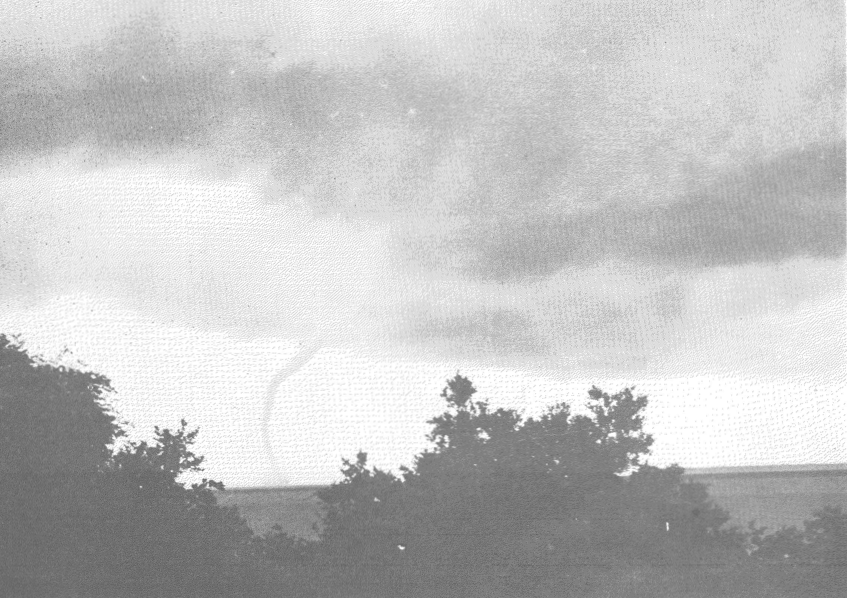
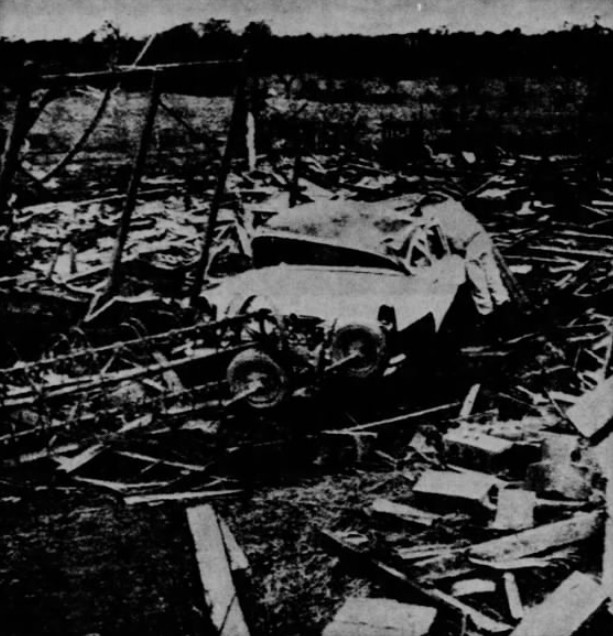
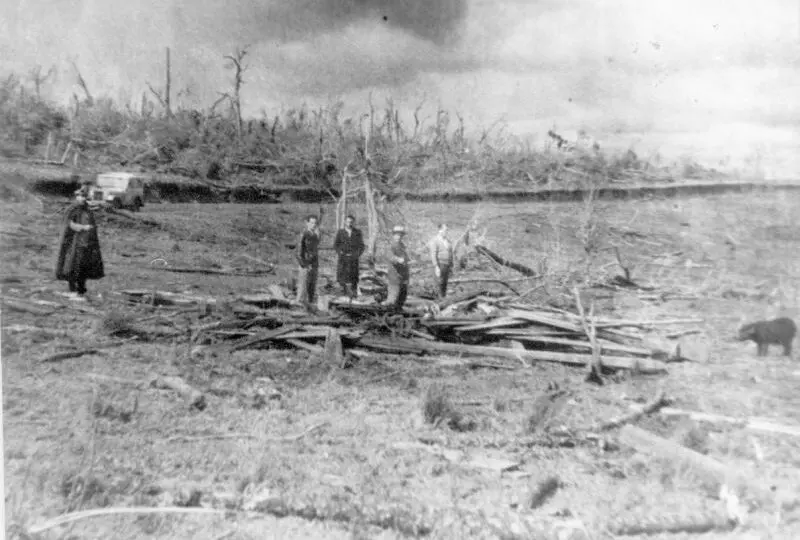
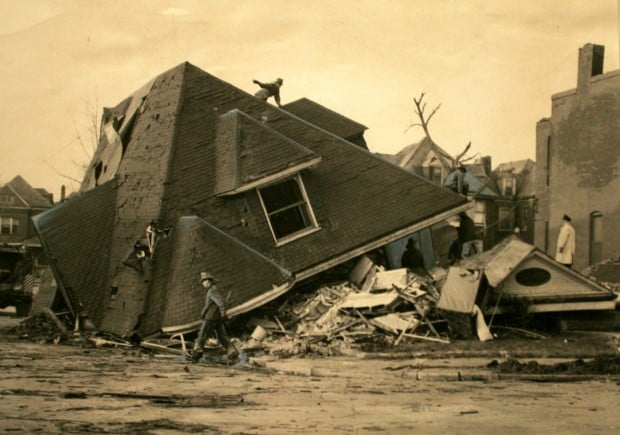
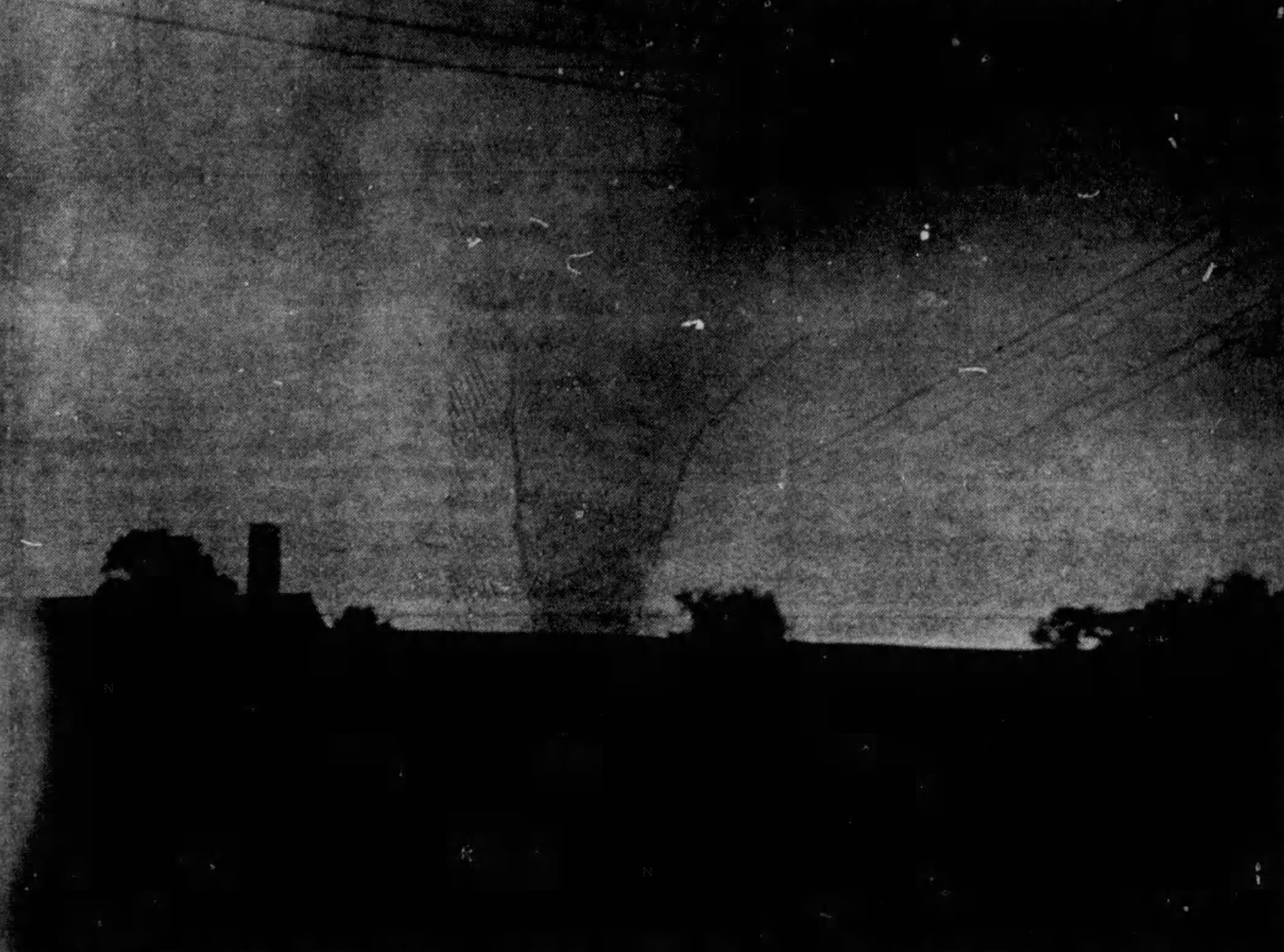
- Clockwise from top: A thin F1 rope tornado near White Oak, Oklahoma on April 17; Violent damage in Stonewall, Oklahoma after an F4 tornado on May 9; The remains of a home in St Louis, Missouri after an F4 tornado on February 10; An F2 tornado approaching Lancaster, Wisconsin on May 19; Extreme damage in Palmas, Paraná after a violent tornado on August 14; A thin tornado near Nags Head, North Carolina during Hurricane Cindy on July 10.
- Timespan: 1959
Maximum rated tornado
F4 tornado
- List
  – St. Louis, Missouri
  on February 10
  – Hillsboro, Texas
  on March 31
  – Wolcott, Kansas-Weatherby Lake, Missouri
  on May 7
  – Stonewall, Oklahoma
  on May 9
  – Adair-Panora-Dawson-Angus, Iowa
  on May 10
  – Plano, Iowa
  on May 20
  – Palmas, Brazil
  on August 14
  – Grovespring, Missouri
  on September 26
  – Chetopa, Kansas
  on September 27
- Tornadoes in U.S.: 604
- Damage (U.S.): Unknown
- Fatalities (U.S.): 58
- Fatalities (worldwide): ~158

Tornadoes and tornado outbreaks of 1959 were tornadoes that appeared primarily in the United States in that year. Most tornadoes form in the U.S., although some events may take place internationally. Tornado statistics for older years like this often appear significantly lower than modern years due to fewer reports or confirmed tornadoes.

== Events ==
Fatal United States tornadoes in 1959
- Approximate touchdown location of killer tornadoes in 1959
Summary of tornadoes
- January 21 – Kentucky (3 deaths)
- February 10 – Missouri, Illinois (21 deaths)
- March 14 – Arkansas (1 death)
- March 14 – Arkansas, Missouri (1 death)
- March 14 – Arkansas (1 death)
- March 31 – Texas (6 deaths)
- April 2 – Florida (1 death)
- May 9 – Oklahoma (7 deaths)
- May 30 – Nebraska (1 death)
- June 11 – Mississippi (1 death)
- June 26 – Wyoming (1 death)
- September 26 – Illinois (1 death)
- September 27 – Kansas, Oklahoma (1 death)
- September 30 – Virginia (1 death)
- September 30 – Virginia (11 deaths)
Total fatalities: 58

1959 had several intense outbreaks, especially during May, which had several violent tornadoes. The year was also historic as an F0 tornado was confirmed in Alaska during December. It was the first tornado ever confirmed in the state as well as the final state to confirm its first tornado since records began in 1950.

=== United States yearly total ===
Confirmed tornadoes by Fujita rating
FU	F0	F1	F2	F3	F4	F5	Total
0	145	262	155	35	7	0	604

== January ==
There were 16 tornadoes confirmed in the US in January.

=== January 20–21 ===
FU	F0	F1	F2	F3	F4	F5
0	1	7	5	3	0	0

All 16 January tornadoes touched down in an intense outbreak that struck the Southeast. It started with two weak tornadoes touching down in Mississippi on January 20. The next day was much more destructive. It started early that morning, when Alabama's lone tornado of the outbreak struck Fairview at F2 strength, causing extensive damage. Then, in Mississippi, a long-tracked F2 tornado caused major damage while just missing several towns in Sharkey and Humphrey Counties. Later, another F2 tornado hit Belmont just west of the Alabama border, injuring one. A long-tracked F3 tornado moved through Ecru, Alpine, and Geeville, and Southwestern Booneville, injuring one as well. Later, a large, 500 yd (460 m) wide F2 tornado moved directly through Adamsville, Tennessee, injuring three. A destructive F3 tornado then hit Carthage and Edinbrug, Mississippi. The final strong tornado was also the only deadly one: A devastating F3 tornado that hit Neafus, and Caneyville, Kentucky, killing three. In the end, the outbreak killed three and injured five.

== February ==
There were 20 tornadoes confirmed in the US in February.

=== February 9–10 ===
FU	F0	F1	F2	F3	F4	F5
0	1	9	3	3	1	0

A strong and devastating outbreak of 17 tornadoes hit the Great Plains, Midwest, and Southeast, mostly during the overnight hours. It started with a large, 800 yards (730 m) wide F1 tornado east of Joplin, Missouri that hit Duquesne and Duenweg, injuring one. Early the next morning, an F0 tornado caused some minor damage in the Northwestern St. Louis suburb of Southeastern Florissant, Missouri. While, this was going on, however, a violent and catastrophic F4 tornado touched down in Crescent, Missouri and tore through Northwestern Downtown St. Louis, ending south of Madison, Illinois. Around 2000 buildings were damaged or destroyed, including 16 homes that were destroyed and over 100 others that suffered major damage. There were 21 fatalities and 345 injuries.

The St. Louis tornado was the first in a slew of significant (F2+) tornadoes that occurred across the region. An F3 tornado hit Bruceville, Indiana, causing significant damage. Later, a large .25 miles (0.40 km) wide F3 tornado struck Eagle Station and Sanders, Kentucky, injuring six. One final large F3 tornado then injured six more people in rural Highland County, Ohio. In the end, the outbreak killed 21 and injured 358.

=== February 17 ===
A rare F1 tornado touched down in Fort Ross, California, causing considerable damage, but no casualties.

== March ==
There were 43 tornadoes confirmed in the US in March.

=== March 13–15 ===
FU	F0	F1	F2	F3	F4	F5
0	0	3	5	1	0	0

An outbreak of nine tornadoes struck the Great Plains and the Mississippi Valley. The first major tornado occurred on the evening of March 14, when a massive 833 yd (762 m) wide F2 tornado hit Moorefield and Charlotte, Arkansas, causing major damage. Later, another large F2 tornado hit areas north of Lonsdale, Arkansas in between Owensville and Crows, killing one and injuring seven. At the same time, another F2 tornado struck Moko, Arkansas and Lanton, Missouri, killing one and injuring 15. The strongest tornado of the outbreak then touched and reached F3 intensity as it tore through Southern Vilonia and Antioch, Arkansas, killing one and injuring three. An F2 tornado then injured one in Modoc, Illinois. The final tornado of the outbreak moved through rural Effingham County, Illinois at F2 intensity just after midnight, injuring two. In the end, the tornadoes hit four states, killing three and injuring 28.

=== March 20–21 ===
FU	F0	F1	F2	F3	F4	F5
0	2	0	4	0	0	0

An outbreak of six tornadoes hit Texas, Oklahoma, and Alabama. On March 20, twin F2 tornadoes tracked from Trenton, Texas and Ector, Texas. Later, a .5 miles (0.80 km) wide F2 tornado moved through Shelby County, Texas, lifting just yards away from the city limits of Paxton. The next day, an isolated, but strong F2 tornado caused heavy damage in Enterprise, Alabama. Despite the damage, there were no casualties from any of the tornadoes.

=== March 25–26 ===
FU	F0	F1	F2	F3	F4	F5
0	4	5	4	1	0	0

An outbreak of 14 tornadoes struck the Great Plains and the Southeast. The first strong tornado of the outbreak occurred in Oklahoma, where an F2 tornado moved through the city of Ardmore. Later, another F2 tornado struck Weatherford and Dead Women Crossing. A brief, but strong F2 tornado then caused significant damage in rural Muskogee County.

The next day, an F2 tornado caused considerable damage northeast of Versailles, Illinois. The final tornado of the outbreak was also the strongest: a large .25 miles (0.40 km) wide F3 tornado tore through Carthage and Southern Defeated and Kempville, Tennessee. Similar to the previous outbreak, despite several strong tornadoes taking place, there were no casualties.

=== March 31 – April 2 ===
FU	F0	F1	F2	F3	F4	F5
0	1	7	4	4	1	0

The trend of non-fatal outbreaks came to an abrupt end when another outbreak of 17 tornadoes struck the Midwest and the Southeast. The first tornado of the outbreak occurred on March 31 in Oklahoma, when an F2 tornado moved through areas north of Morrison. An F1 tornado then injured one north of Pawnee. Three people were then injured by an F3 tornado in Silver City.

Later, a massive, 1 mile (1.6 km) wide F3 tornado hit Western Callisburg, Texas, injuring 16. Another large, 600 yards (550 m) wide F3 tornado tore through Enos, Southern Kingston, and New Woodville, Oklahoma, injuring 10. The worst tornado then touched down, becoming a violent, 1 mile (1.6 km) wide F4 tornado that obliterated Aquilla, Vaughan, and Southern Hillsboro, Texas, killing six and injuring 31. An F3 tornado then caused major damage in Paris, Arkansas.

After only five weak F1 tornadoes touched down in Texas, Georgia, and Indiana on April 1, April 2 produced three short-lived, but destructive early-morning F2 tornadoes in Florida (possibly from the same cell). The first one hit Dade City, injuring 12. The second one struck Eastern Orlando, killing one and injuring nine. The final F2 tornado hit Mims, Florida, injuring one. In the end, the outbreak was extremely destructive, killing seven and injuring 83.

== April ==
There were 30 confirmed tornadoes in the US in April.

== May ==
There were 226 confirmed tornadoes in the US in May.

=== May 4–6 ===
FU	F0	F1	F2	F3	F4	F5
0	11	22	15	0	0	0

A massive outbreak of 50 tornadoes struck the Great Plains and the Midwest, with 46 of them occurring on May 4. The first major tornado of the outbreak was an F2 tornado that struck Sabinal, Texas. A massive, 1,200 yards (1,100 m) wide F2 tornado then hit the south side of Knippa, Texas. Later, a brief F1 tornado injured one northeast of Loma, Nebraska. An F2 tornado hit Carter, Oklahoma, injuring one. A destructive, mile-wide F2 tornado hit Sabetha and Whiting, Kansas.

Two weak tornadoes hit Minnesota and Wisconsin on May 5 before two F2 tornadoes hit Wisconsin on May 6. The first one was a mile-wide and hit Bear Creek. The second one was brief, but caused major damage northeast of Shiocton. In the end, the outbreak injured two.

=== May 8–12 ===
FU	F0	F1	F2	F3	F4	F5
0	10	21	20	7	2	0

An outbreak sequence of 60 tornadoes hit areas from New Mexico and Kansas to Alabama and Connecticut. The first major tornado of the outbreak occurred on May 8, when an F1 tornado injured one in Fritch, Texas. No tornadoes on this day exceeded F1 strength however. This would not be the case the next day. A half-mile wide F3 tornado tracked along the Neosho River and Grand Lake O' the Cherokees, striking the towns of Langley, Disney, Dennis, and Grove, Oklahoma injuring three. Later, another F3 tornado hit Watova, Oklahoma. Another F3 tornado hit Rubio, Iowa before the worst tornado of the outbreak occurred. A violent F4 tornado hit Stonewall, Oklahoma, killing seven and injuring 12.

Tornadoes continued to touch down into the overnight hours as well as the next day. An F3 tornado hit Glasgow, Lockridge and Wayland, Iowa, injuring one. Early the next morning, an F1 tornado hit the Southern St. Louis suburb of Columbia, Illinois, causing heavy damage. That afternoon, a large, long-tracked F4 tornado hit Eastern Adair, Northwestern Panora, Southeastern Dawson, and Southeastern Angus, Iowa, injuring one on its 41.1 miles (66.1 km) path. Later, a large, destructive, 667 yards (610 m) wide F3 tornado hit Austin and Southern Pflugerville, Texas. An F2 tornado injured one northeast of Sallisaw, Oklahoma. That evening, an F3 tornado struck Wheelock, Texas, injuring seven. A destructive F2 tornado touched down in Ashwaubenon, Wisconsin and moved directly through Downtown Green Bay, injuring three.

Less, but still destructive tornado activity occurred on the final two days of the outbreak. On May 11, an early-morning F2 tornado caused heavy damage southwest of Monticello, Illinois. The next day, a half-mile wide F3 tornado hit the Southern Birmingham suburb of Shannon, Alabama, injuring five. The final tornado of the outbreak then struck areas northeast Salisbury, Connecticut, causing F2 damage. In the end, the outbreak sequence killed seven and injured 34.

=== May 20–21 ===
FU	F0	F1	F2	F3	F4	F5
0	3	8	2	1	1	0

An outbreak of 15 tornadoes hit the Great Plains, Midwest, and Southeast. The worst event occurred on May 20, when a violent, quarter-mile wide F4 tornado hit the northwest side of Plano, Iowa while moving through Wayne County, injuring five. Later, an F2 tornado occurred in rural Smith County, Kansas. Another F2 tornado traveled 12 miles (19 km) through Saunders County, Nebraska, although the exact track of the tornado is unknown. Early the next morning, an F3 tornado caused considerable damage at Port Bolivar, Texas. The final tornado of the outbreak hit the Northwestern Tampa suburb of Town 'N' Country, Florida at F1 strength that afternoon. Overall, the outbreak injured five.

=== May 30–31 ===
FU	F0	F1	F2	F3	F4	F5
0	0	5	2	1	0	0

A small, but deadly outbreak of eight tornadoes hit areas from Nebraska to Connecticut. The worst tornado was an F2 tornado that hit Crofton, Menominee, and St. Helena, Nebraska, killing one and injuring two. Later, a brief but strong F3 tornado damaged areas east of Yankton, South Dakota. The final tornado took place early the next morning, when quarter-mile wide F2 tornado struck Zearing, Iowa. Overall, the outbreak killed one and injured two.

== June ==
There were 73 tornadoes confirmed in the US in June.

=== June 10–12 ===
FU	F0	F1	F2	F3	F4	F5
0	5	8	1	0	0	0

An outbreak sequence of 14 tornadoes hit the Midwest and the Mississippi Valley. On June 10, a brief, but strong F2 tornado hit Casselton, North Dakota. On June 11, an F1 tornado hit Clarksdale, Mississippi, killing one. On June 12, the final tornado, which was rated F0, injured three in Jamestown West, New York. Overall, the outbreak sequence killed one and injured three.

=== June 17 ===
FU	F0	F1	F2	F3	F4	F5
0	2	0	1	1	0	0

A destructive F3 tornado tore through the Miami Suburbs including Coral Gables, Little Gables, Western Miami, El Portal, Miami Shores, and Biscayne Park, Florida, injuring 77. Other tornadoes took place in Florida and Nebraska, including an F2 tornado that hit Limestone Creek, Florida. The tornadoes in Florida were associated with the tropical depression that later strengthened into the 1959 Escuminac hurricane.

=== June 26 ===
FU	F0	F1	F2	F3	F4	F5
0	1	2	1	0	0	0

An F2 tornado killed one and injured another east of Shell, Wyoming in the Bighorn National Forest, becoming the first fatal Wyoming tornado since modern records began in 1950. Three other weak tornadoes touched down in Wisconsin, Minnesota, and Texas.

== July ==
There were 63 tornadoes confirmed in the US in July.

=== July 28 ===
A rare F0 tornado touched down west of Utuado, Puerto Rico, causing considerable damage, but no casualties.

== August ==
There were 38 confirmed tornadoes in the US in August.

== September ==
There were 58 tornadoes confirmed in the US in September.

=== September 26–29 (Pre–Hurricane Gracie) ===
FU	F0	F1	F2	F3	F4	F5
0	4	16	12	1	2	0

A deadly outbreak sequence of 36 tornadoes struck areas from Idaho to Indiana at the end of September. It started on the morning of September 26, when an F1 tornado injured three northwest of Avenue City, Missouri. That afternoon, a violent F4 tornado tore directly through Grovespring, Missouri, although there were no casualties. Unfortunately, this was not the case in Monmouth, Illinois, where a fatal F2 tornado killed one. Later, an F2 tornado hit Northern Plano, Idaho, becoming the first of only 10 F2 tornadoes to hit the state (as of 2026, the state has no tornadoes rated EF2 and no tornado has ever reached F3/EF3+ status). At the same time, an F1 tornado struck Palatine, and Buffalo Grove and Lake Forest, Illinois northwest of Chicago, injuring 14. This was followed by a long-tracked, 667 yards (610 m) wide F3 tornado that struck Athelstan and Luxora, Arkansas, Elmot Bar, Tennessee, Fletcher Towhead, and Island Number 28, Arkansas, and Ashport, Tennessee, injuring 21. Meanwhile, in the Southern Milwaukee suburbs, an F2 tornado hit Greendale, Wisconsin, injuring three while an F1 tornado passed south of Rochester before moving through Sylvania, Sturtevant, and Northwestern Elmwood Park, injuring two.

Tornado activity slowed after that, but some strong tornadoes still touched down. On September 27, a violent F4 tornado moved through rural Craig County, Oklahoma before moving into Kansas, growing .25 miles (0.40 km), and striking Western Chetopa, killing one and injuring one. Later, an F1 tornado hit Polk, Missouri, injuring one. An F2 tornado then hit Bardolph and Southeastern Bushnell, Illinois, injuring one as well. September 28 saw an F1 tornado injure one Rich Mountain, Missouri before the outbreak ended with an isolated F0 tornado southeast of Midfield, Texas on September 29. In the end, eight states were impacted by the outbreak, which killed two and injured 47.

=== September 29–30 (Hurricane Gracie) ===
FU	F0	F1	F2	F3	F4	F5
0	0	3	0	3	0	0

An hour and 26 minutes after the previous outbreak ended, landfalling Category 4 Hurricane Gracie triggered another outbreak of six tornadoes in the Southeast. On September 30, the final three tornadoes of the outbreak were all F3 tornados that caused major damage in Virginia. The first one struck Stanardsville, killing one and injuring nine. The next one was the deadliest of the outbreak, killing 11 and injuring four in Ivy. The final one was half-mile wide and caused major damage in Pleasant Grove Park. In the end, six tornadoes were confirmed, killing 12 and injuring 13.

== October ==
There were 24 tornadoes confirmed in the US in October.

=== October 2–4 ===
FU	F0	F1	F2	F3	F4	F5
0	3	5	1	1	0	0

A small, but destructive outbreak of 10 tornadoes struck the Great Plains at the beginning of October with Dallas-Fort Worth Metroplex taking the brunt of them. Early on October 3, an F1 tornado caused heavy damage Eastern Fort Worth. The next morning, an even earlier and more destructive F1 tornado struck Joshua, Burleson, and Everman, Texas. Later that morning, an F3 tornado hit the Eastern Dallas suburbs, tearing through the towns of Mesquite, Tripp, Sunnyvale, Rockwall, Lavon and Copeville, Texas, injuring five. Additionally, an F2 tornado then injured two when it struck the town of Yuba, Oklahoma. Overall, the outbreak injured seven.

== November ==
There were 11 tornadoes confirmed in the US in November.

=== November 2–4 ===
FU	F0	F1	F2	F3	F4	F5
0	1	3	3	2	0	0

An outbreak sequence of 10 tornadoes struck the US. It started with an early-morning F1 tornado west of Prescott Valley, Arizona on November 2 before the outbreak mostly focused on Texas. On November 3, an F2 tornado damaged Corral City. Another F2 tornado then grew to mile-wide and damaged Center Point and Northern Comfort. A third F2 tornado then struck Northern Bowie. The worst tornado of the outbreak occurred just after midnight on November 4, when an F3 tornado touched down and moved through rural areas of Henderson County, before striking Leagueville and Brownsboro, injuring three. Another destructive F3 tornado later hit Northern Darco and Western Stricklin Springs.

Following the second F3 tornado, an extremely rare F0 tornado touched down in Alaska on Kayak Island that afternoon and caused some minor damage to Cape St. Elias. This was the first tornado ever confirmed in Alaska, thus making it the 50th and final state to confirm their first tornado since 1950. The outbreak ended with an F1 tornado that hit Star, Mississippi 55 minutes later. In the end, the outbreak sequence injured three.

== December ==
There were 2 tornadoes confirmed in the US in December.

== See also ==
- Tornado
  - Tornadoes by year
  - Tornado records
  - Tornado climatology
  - Tornado myths
- List of tornado outbreaks
  - List of F5 and EF5 tornadoes
  - List of North American tornadoes and tornado outbreaks
  - List of 21st-century Canadian tornadoes and tornado outbreaks
  - List of European tornadoes and tornado outbreaks
  - List of tornadoes and tornado outbreaks in Asia
  - List of Southern Hemisphere tornadoes and tornado outbreaks
  - List of tornadoes striking downtown areas
  - List of tornadoes with confirmed satellite tornadoes
- Tornado intensity
  - Fujita scale
  - Enhanced Fujita scale
