= Reception Building =

- Formerly listed on the U.S. National Register of Historic Places
- Alaska Heritage Resources Survey
- Location within Alaska
- Location: Northeastern corner of 2nd Street and Browning Avenue, Cordova, Alaska
- Coordinates: 60°32′41″N 145°45′24″W
- Area: less than one acre
- Built: 1908
- Built by: O.W. "Link" Wahn; Bill Williams
- NRHP reference No.: 80004566
- AHRS No.: COR-115

Significant dates
- Added to NRHP: April 9, 1980
- Designated AHRS: February 10, 1978
- Removed from NRHP: April 26, 2019

The Reception Building, once known as the Reception Saloon, is a historic building at the corner of 2nd Street and Browning Avenue in Cordova, Alaska. Set into a hillside, it is a wood-frame structure with two stories at the front and one at the rear. Built in 1908, it is one of the few surviving buildings associated with the early days of the city's development. The Reception Saloon was established by Owen Webster "Link" Wain, a major figure in the economic development of frontier Alaska in the early 20th century, and operated from 1908 until its closure due to Prohibition in 1918.

The building was listed on the National Register of Historic Places in 1980, and was delisted in 2019.

== See also ==
- National Register of Historic Places listings in Chugach Census Area, Alaska
