= Cordova Post Office and Courthouse =

- U.S. National Register of Historic Places
- Alaska Heritage Resources Survey
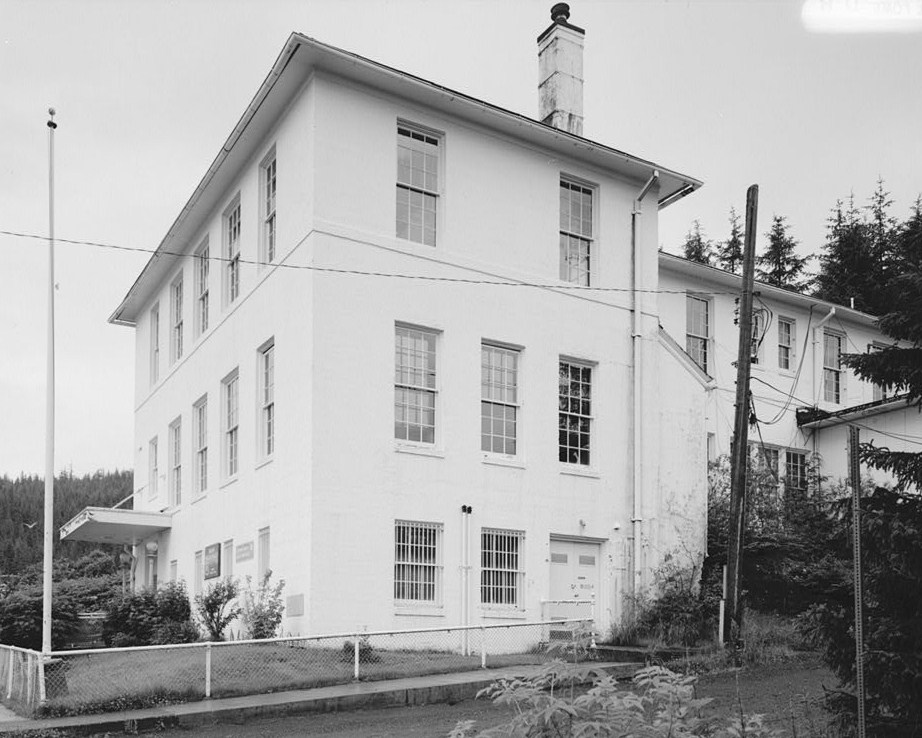
- U.S. Post Office & Courthouse

- Location within Alaska
- Location: 612 2nd Street, Cordova, Alaska
- Coordinates: 60°32′39″N 145°45′24″W
- Area: 1 acre (0.40 ha)
- Built: 1924
- NRHP reference No.: 77001571
- AHRS No.: COR-083

Significant dates
- Added to NRHP: August 2, 1977
- Designated AHRS: 1970

The Cordova Post Office and Courthouse is a historic government building at 612 2nd Street in Cordova, Alaska. It is an L-shaped building, its structure determined in part by the site, which is set into a hill. At the front it is three stories in height and five bays wide, with its main entrance in the leftmost bay, sheltered by a modern solid canopy. The exterior is finished in concrete. The interior originally had the post office on the first floor, a courtroom and judge's chambers on the second floor, and other court offices and a law library on the third floor.

The building was listed on the National Register of Historic Places in 1977, at which time it was reported to be the oldest post office building in Alaska still in use as a post office. Cordova's main post office is now at 502 Railroad Avenue, and its court is now located at 500 Water Street.

Currently, the building is utilized as the office for the Chugach National Forest's Cordova Ranger District.

== See also ==
- National Register of Historic Places listings in Chugach Census Area, Alaska
- List of United States post offices
