= Cape St. Elias Light =

Lighthouse on Kayak Island in Alaska, US

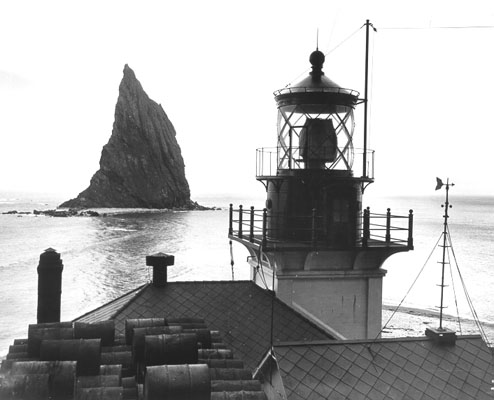
- Top of Cape St. Elias light
- Location: Cape St. Elias; Kayak Island; Alaska; United States
- Coordinates: 59°47′54″N 144°35′56″W

Tower
- Foundation: rock
- Construction: concrete tower
- Automated: 1974
- Height: 55 feet (17 m)
- Shape: square tower at one corner of fog signal building.
- Markings: art deco architecture white tower, red lantern
- Power source: solar power
- Operator: Cape St. Elias Lighthouse Keepers Association
- Heritage: National Register of Historic Places listed place

Light
- First lit: 1916
- Focal height: 85 feet (26 m)
- Lens: Third-order Fresnel lens (original), VRB-25 aerobeacon (current)
- Range: 17 nautical miles (31 km; 20 mi)
- Characteristic: Fl W 10s. obscured from 160° to 287° and from 018.5 to 027° emergency light (Fl W 6s) of reduced intensity when main light is extinguished.
- Cape St. Elias Lighthouse
- U.S. National Register of Historic Places
- Alaska Heritage Resources Survey
- Nearest city: Katalla, Alaska
- Area: less than one acre
- Built: 1915
- NRHP reference No.: 75002157
- AHRS No.: XMI-003

Significant dates
- Added to NRHP: December 18, 1975
- Designated AHRS: 1970

The Cape St. Elias Light is a lighthouse on Kayak Island in Alaska.

== History ==
Congress approved the construction of a light station at Cape St. Elias in October 1913, appropriating $115,000 for the construction. construction began in 1915 and a third order Fresnel lens was installed. In 1927 the station was equipped with radio beacon facilities, which was the second such facility in Alaska. The light was automated by the United States Coast Guard in 1974. In 1998 a solar powered Vega optic was installed, replacing the original lens, which is in the Cordova Museum in Cordova, Alaska. Cape St. Elias Lighthouse was added to the National Register of Historic Places in 1975. It is now being leased by the Cape St. Elias Lightkeepers Association, a non-profit organization dedicated to preserving, restoring and sharing the lighthouse.

It began operations in 1916, which was the year that the Alaska Engineering Commission started building the Alaska Railroad "which eventually established Southcentral Alaska as the economic hub of all Alaska". This lighthouse "proved to be an indispensable navigational aid along the shipping lanes from the contiguous American states and Southeastern Alaska to Cordova, Valdez, Seward, and Anchorage". Those ports could be notified of ships arriving, by station keeper radio that also was installed in 1916.

== Climate ==
Climate data for Cape St. Elias Light, Alaska
| Month | Jan | Feb | Mar | Apr | May | Jun | Jul | Aug | Sep | Oct | Nov | Dec | Year |
|---|---|---|---|---|---|---|---|---|---|---|---|---|---|
| Record high °F (°C) | 49 (9) | 51 (11) | 62 (17) | 65 (18) | 74 (23) | 71 (22) | 78 (26) | 76 (24) | 75 (24) | 65 (18) | 55 (13) | 51 (11) | 78 (26) |
| Mean daily maximum °F (°C) | 34.6 (1.4) | 36.6 (2.6) | 37.2 (2.9) | 42.6 (5.9) | 48.0 (8.9) | 53.6 (12.0) | 57.7 (14.3) | 58.3 (14.6) | 55.2 (12.9) | 47.6 (8.7) | 40.8 (4.9) | 36.7 (2.6) | 45.7 (7.6) |
| Daily mean °F (°C) | 31.0 (−0.6) | 33.2 (0.7) | 33.4 (0.8) | 38.3 (3.5) | 43.9 (6.6) | 49.6 (9.8) | 53.7 (12.1) | 54.5 (12.5) | 51.1 (10.6) | 43.4 (6.3) | 37.3 (2.9) | 33.3 (0.7) | 41.9 (5.5) |
| Mean daily minimum °F (°C) | 27.4 (−2.6) | 29.8 (−1.2) | 29.5 (−1.4) | 33.9 (1.1) | 39.7 (4.3) | 45.5 (7.5) | 49.7 (9.8) | 50.7 (10.4) | 46.9 (8.3) | 39.2 (4.0) | 33.7 (0.9) | 29.8 (−1.2) | 38.0 (3.3) |
| Record low °F (°C) | 4 (−16) | 1 (−17) | 8 (−13) | 17 (−8) | 25 (−4) | 36 (2) | 30 (−1) | 33 (1) | 23 (−5) | 13 (−11) | 12 (−11) | 0 (−18) | 0 (−18) |
| Average precipitation inches (mm) | 7.43 (189) | 7.12 (181) | 6.68 (170) | 6.15 (156) | 6.00 (152) | 4.08 (104) | 7.09 (180) | 9.66 (245) | 12.00 (305) | 12.41 (315) | 9.58 (243) | 9.70 (246) | 97.90 (2,487) |
| Average snowfall inches (cm) | 22.1 (56) | 18.6 (47) | 13.2 (34) | 4.3 (11) | 0.2 (0.51) | 0.0 (0.0) | 0.0 (0.0) | 0.0 (0.0) | 0.0 (0.0) | 1.6 (4.1) | 7.1 (18) | 19.7 (50) | 86.8 (220) |

== See also ==
- List of lighthouses in the United States
- National Register of Historic Places listings in Chugach Census Area, Alaska
