= Pioneer Igloo Hall Number 19 =

- U.S. National Register of Historic Places
- Location within Alaska
- Location: 621 1st Street, Cordova, Alaska
- Coordinates: 60°32′38″N 145°45′33″W
- Area: less than one acre
- Built: 1927
- Architectural style: Log
- NRHP reference No.: 12000492
- Added to NRHP: August 15, 2012

The Pioneer Igloo Hall Number 19 is a historic social club building at 621 First Street in Cordova, Alaska. It is a log structure, built in 1927–28 to resemble a typical Alaskan trapper's cabin, and occupies a prominent location overlooking the city's downtown. It was built by the local chapter of the Pioneers of Alaska (whose chapters were called "igloos") as a meeting space and community hall. The hall has been the subject of restoration and rehabilitation efforts by the local Pioneers, with statewide listing on an endangered structures list in 2012 and 2013.

The building was listed on the National Register of Historic Places in 1982.

== See also ==
- National Register of Historic Places listings in Chugach Census Area, Alaska
