= Red Dragon Historic District =

Historic district in Alaska, United States

- U.S. National Register of Historic Places
- U.S. Historic district
- Alaska Heritage Resources Survey
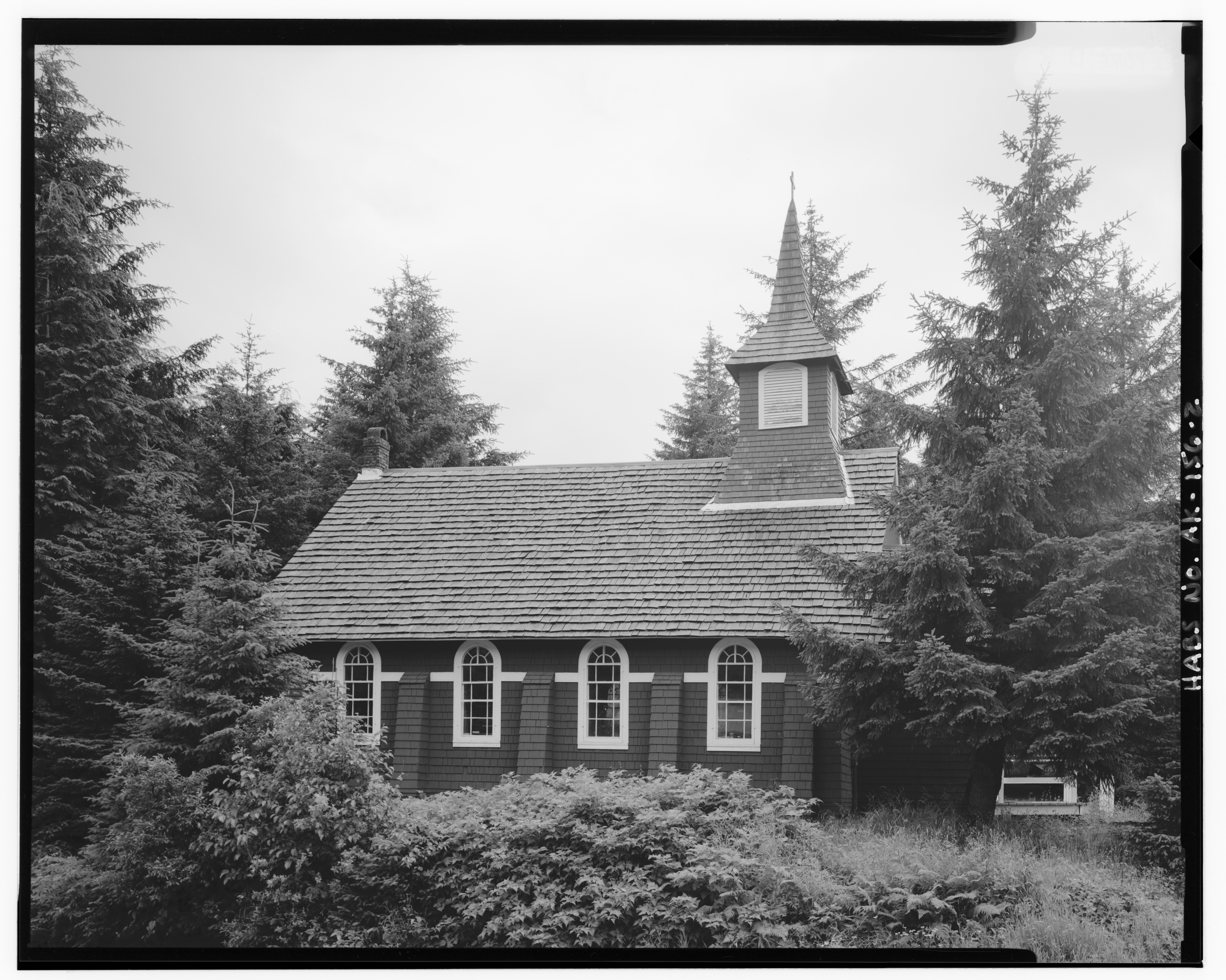

- Location within Alaska
- Location: Roughly bounded by Lake Avenue, 1st Street and 2nd Street, Cordova, Alaska
- Coordinates: 60°32′32″N 145°45′28″W
- Area: less than one acre
- Built: 1918
- Built by: Bartley Howard
- Architect: E.P. Ziegler
- Architectural style: English church architecture
- NRHP reference No.: 82004899
- AHRS No.: COR-170

Significant dates
- Added to NRHP: August 31, 1982
- Designated AHRS: April 15, 1975

The Red Dragon Historic District encompasses the historic buildings of the St. George's Episcopal mission in Cordova, Alaska. It includes two buildings: the St. George's Episcopal Church, a modest wood-frame structure completed in 1919, and the "Red Dragon" Reading Room, so named because of its traditionally bright red exterior. The Red Dragon was built in 1908, and was the second structure erected in Cordova. It has long served as a social and recreational venue for the Cordova community, and for many years also housed the city's public library.

The district was listed on the National Register of Historic Places in 1982.

== See also ==
- National Register of Historic Places listings in Chugach Census Area, Alaska
