= Orca Inlet =

Bay in Alaska, United States

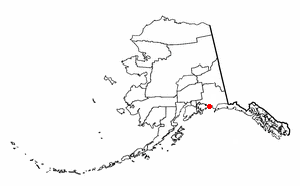
Location in Alaska

Orca Inlet is an arm of Prince William Sound in southern Alaska. The town of Cordova was founded on its coast in 1906. All marine traffic reaches the town through Orca Inlet.

== Geography ==
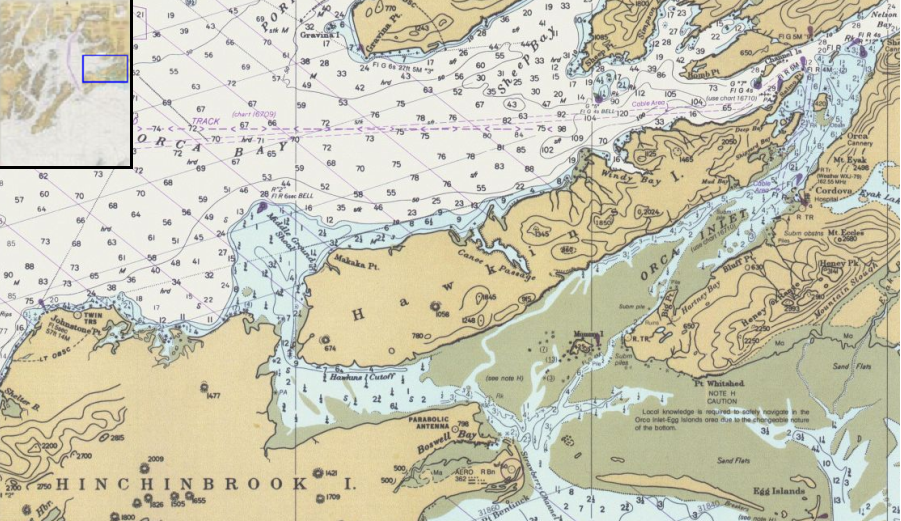
Orca Inlet and Orca Bay surround Hawkins Island

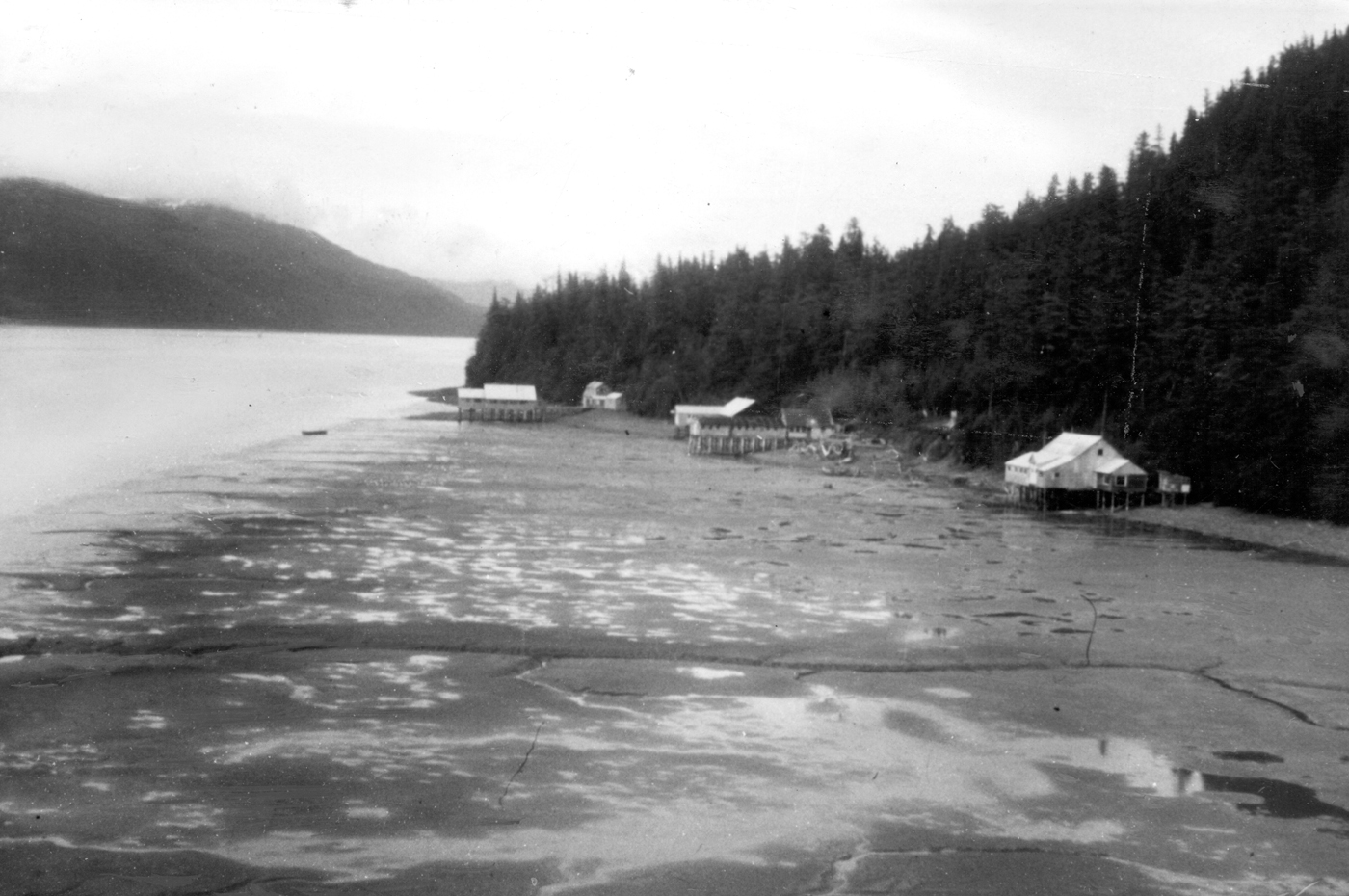
Uplifted land after the 1964 earthquake; boathouses and canneries left high and dry at high tide -USGS photo

Orca Inlet lies south and east of Hawkins Island at 60°31′25″N 145°52′46″W. The Inlet is about 16 miles (26 km) long running southwest and about 3 miles (4.8 km) wide at its widest point. The south end opens into the Gulf of Alaska while the north end joins with Orca Bay.

The city of Cordova, Alaska is situated on the southeast shore of Orca Inlet.

== History ==
Orca Inlet was listed in the Geographic Dictionary of Alaska in 1906, citing J.F. Moser's report from 1897. The Orca Cannery operated on the south shore of the inlet; there was a post office at that location from 1894. The Odiak Cannery was located 3 miles (4.8 km) southwest of Orca, at the present location of Cordova.

There were once large Pacific razor clam beds in the intertidal zones of Orca Inlet which were harvested and shipped out of Cordova. Harvests reached 3.5 million pounds (1.6 million kilograms) at its peak. Populations began to decline in the late 1950s. When the 1964 Good Friday earthquake struck the clam beds were uplifted around 6 feet (1.8 m) exposing them out of the intertidal zone. This led to moderate mortality and eventually the industry crashed.

== Geology and currents ==
Like other arms of Prince William Sound, Orca Inlet is a fjord. There are large areas on its coast with large rounded rocks as well as many cirques and hanging valleys. Glacial erosion created steep walls on the sides of the fjord. In one area the elevation rises to 1,600 feet (490 m) within 1/2 mile (0.80 km) of the coastline. The southern and central areas are filled with sediment making the area very shallow. These deposits resulted from the receded glacier that once filled the fjord as well as current inflow through the seaward end of the inlet from the Copper River and other smaller glacial streams. These deposits drift westward along the coast until they reach the entrance of Orca Inlet. Orca Inlet can serve as an entrance to Prince William Sound from the Gulf of Alaska but the shallow water limits the size of vessels that can use the route. In 1914, the southern two-thirds of the inlet was generally 12 feet (3.7 m) deep or less with a few, discontinuous channels, while the north part was 90 to 228 feet (27 to 69 m) deep.

Copper ore has been found in the area around Orca Inlet but there has been little development to mine it.

The tidal current flows southward on the flood and northward on the ebb. Mean velocity at the peak of the flood is 1.5 knots (2.8 km/h; 1.7 mph) and 0.8 knots (1.5 km/h; 0.92 mph) at the peak of the ebb.

== Gallery ==
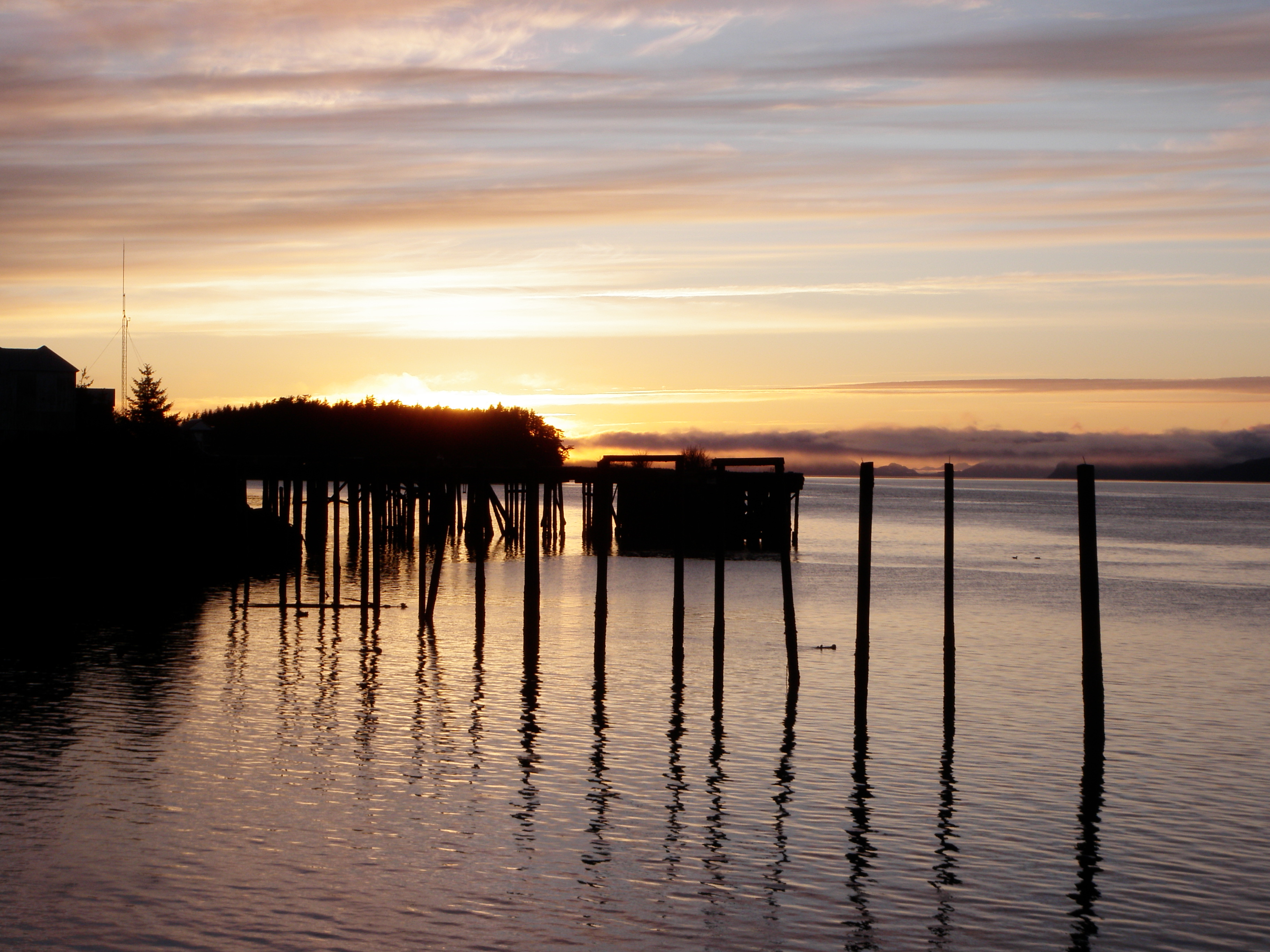
Seen from Cordova, the sun sets over Orca Inlet

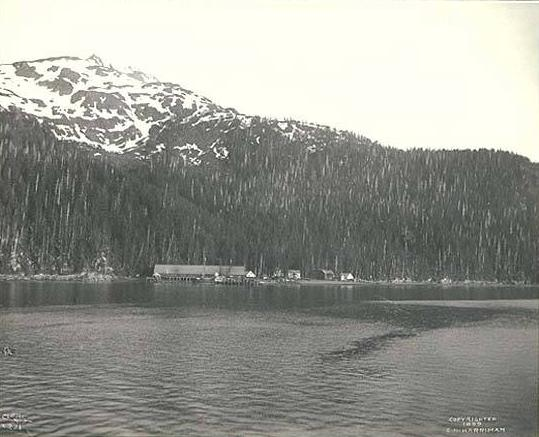
Cannery and village of Orca, about 3 miles (4.8 km) northeast of present-day Cordova, E.S. Curtis, June 1899

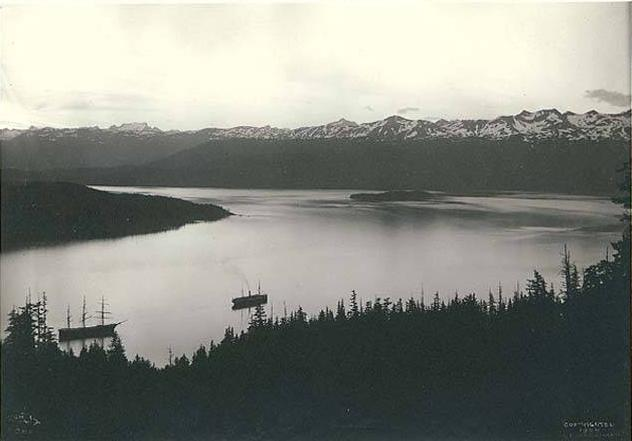
Orca Harbor (the east end of Orca Inlet) from the mountain above the village of Orca, about 3 miles (4.8 km) northeast of present-day Cordova, E.S. Curtis, June 1899

== See also ==
- Orca Bay, on the north west side of Hawkins Island
