= Hawkins Island =

Island in Alaska, United States

Coordinates: 60°31′40″N 146°02′57″W

Hawkins Island is an island in the northern part of the Gulf of Alaska in the state of Alaska, United States. It lies just west of the city of Cordova, between that city and the further offshore Hinchinbrook Island. Prince William Sound lies to the north side of the island, while Orca Inlet and the main body of the Gulf of Alaska lie to its south. Hawkins Island has a land area of 176.388 km^{2} (68.1039 sq mi) and a population of four persons was reported as of the 2000 census.
