= Katalla, Alaska =

Katalla
- Ghost town
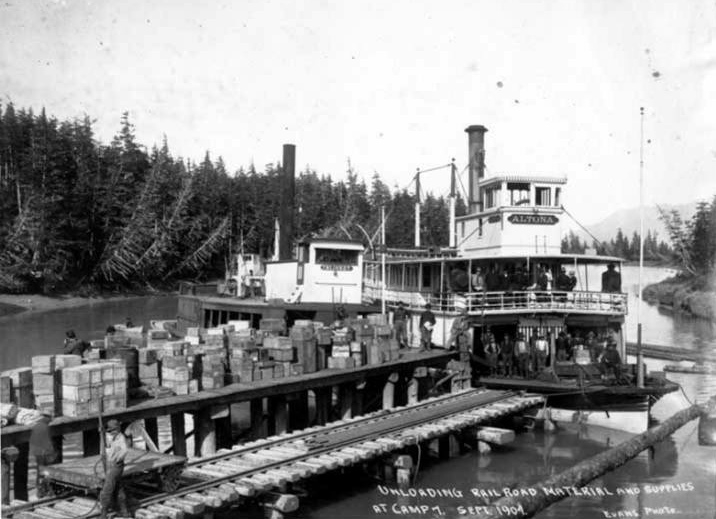
- The steamers Altona and Thlinket unloading rail supplies in Katalla, 1907.

- Location within the state of Alaska
- Coordinates: 60°11′42″N 144°31′16″W
- Country: United States
- State: Alaska
- Census area: Chugach

Government
  - State senator: Gary Stevens (R)
  - State rep.: Louise Stutes (R)
- Time zone: UTC-9 (Alaska (AKST))
  - Summer (DST): UTC-8 (AKDT)

Katalla (pronounced KA-tell-ah, sometimes spelled Catalla) is a ghost town in the Chugach Census Area in the U.S. state of Alaska, 76 km (47 mi) southeast of Cordova. The name of this town was sometimes spelled Catalla. It is now abandoned.

== Geography ==
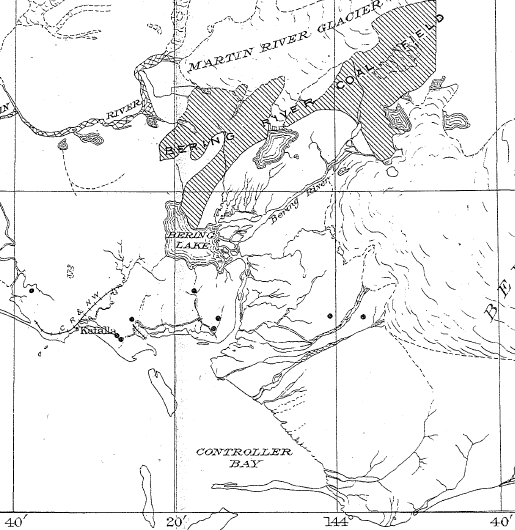
1917 USGS map depicting Katalla in relation to the rail road and the Bering River Coal Field. A black dot depicts petroleum seepage.

Katalla is located within the Chugach National Forest near Controller Bay and the Bering River.

== History ==
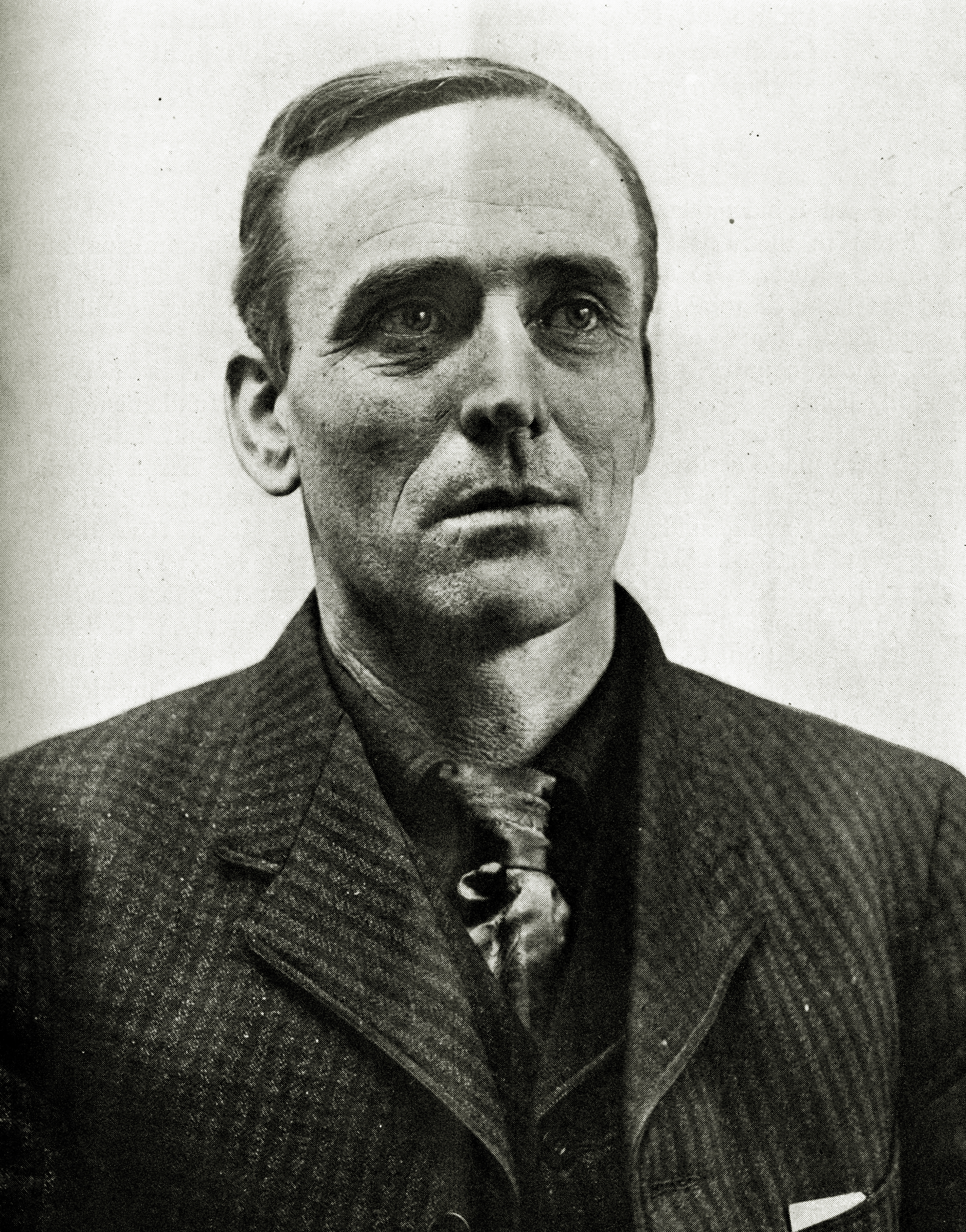
Prospector Tom White, referred to as "The Sourdough Driller" in the writings of Barrett Willoughby, was credited with discovering Katalla's oil fields and drilling the first well.

Katalla was at the center of the now-abandoned Katalla oil field. This was the first discovery of commercial quantities of oil in Alaska (1902). The town reportedly had a population of 5,000 in 1907–1908.

This was the result of the announcement that the Copper River and Northwestern Railway (CR&NW) was going to use the town's location as its access to the Pacific Ocean and the Bering River coal fields. Violent storms in the fall of 1907 destroyed the jetty being built and it was decided to move the railroad's terminus to nearby Cordova.

The famous "ship of gold" SS Portland, ran aground and sank at Katalla in November 1910, during one of these autumn storms. The town's population continued to depend on the small oil field for income until December 25, 1933, when fire damaged its refinery and operations ceased. The town's post office closed in 1943 and the town site was abandoned.

The oil and gas extraction rights for the Katalla area were granted to the Chugach Alaska Corporation by the Alaska Native Claims Settlement Act. Before that, however, at least some of the rights to the field were owned by the California-Mexican-Alaska Holding Company, which dissolved and sold its assets to the Alaska Coal, Oil & By-Products Company in 1929.

A Korean coal mining consortium resurrected potential interest in Katalla after they did coal exploration in the Bering River coal fields in the early 1980s. Interest waned as the coal reserves did not appear economically viable, and a haul route to Katalla would by necessity have to cross areas subject to slope instability and periodic glacial dam outbursts from Bering Lake.

== Demographics ==
Historical population
Census	Pop.	Note	%±
1910	188		—
1920	84		−55.3%
1930	44		−47.6%
1940	23		−47.7%
U.S. Decennial Census

Katalla first appeared on the 1910 U.S. Census as an unincorporated village. It continued to report until 1940, after which it was abandoned.
