= Guillaume Leduey =

French linguist (born 1989)

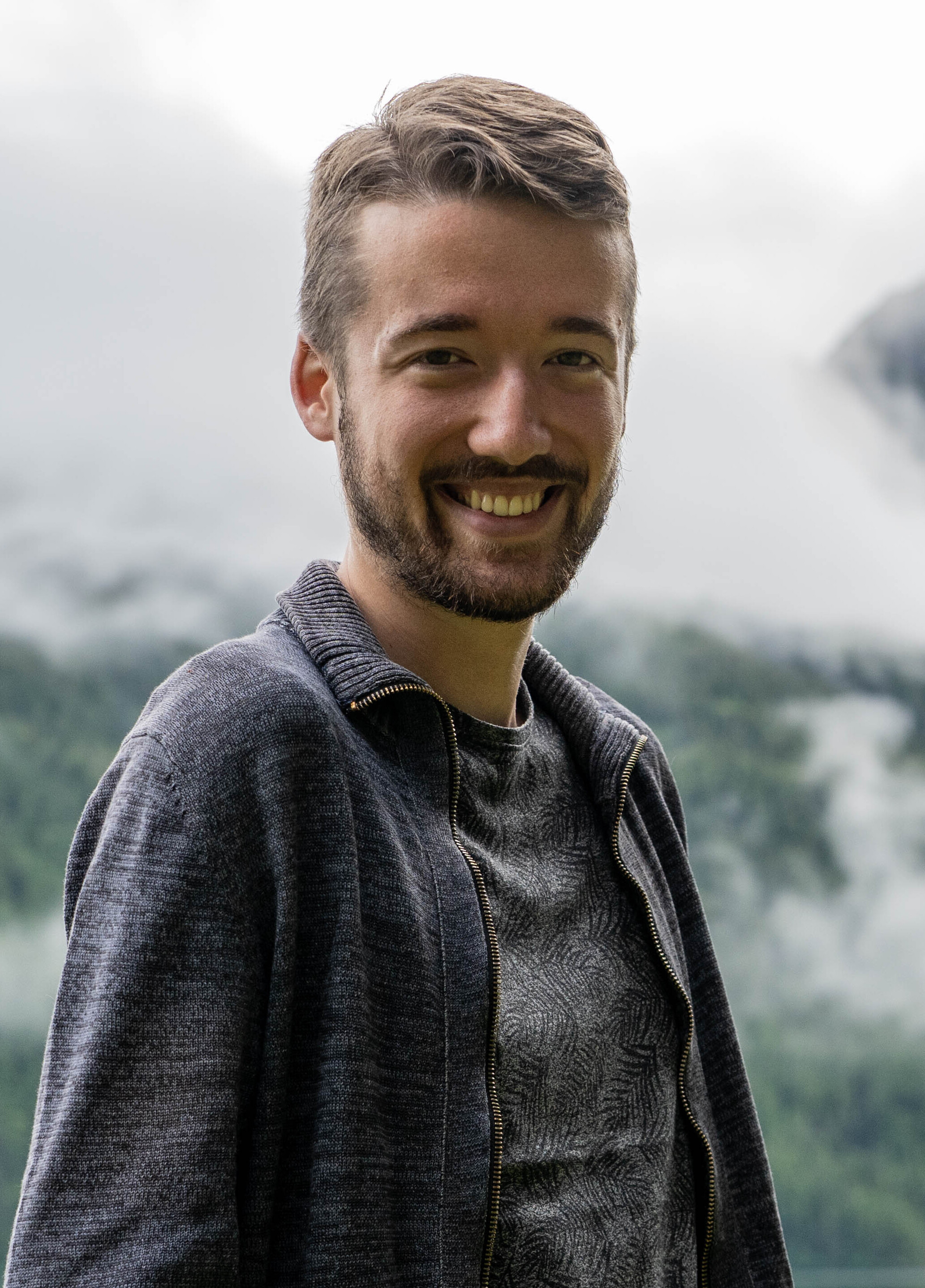
- Leduey in 2018
- Born: March 20, 1989 (age 37); Le Havre, France
- Scientific career
- Fields: Linguistics
- Academic advisors: Michael E. Krauss

Guillaume Leduey (born March 20, 1989) is a French linguist and polyglot from Le Havre, France, and also a sculptor. Leduey is known for studying the now-extinct Eyak language and active participation in the campaign to revive it.

Leduey is a polyglot, and he is able to speak five languages besides Eyak: French, English, German, Chinese, Georgian and some Lithuanian. Leduey became interested in the dying Eyak language after he learned about its last native speaker, Marie Smith Jones, on the Internet. At 12 or 13 years old he ordered Eyak text, audio materials and DVDs and started to study it.

Leduey engaged in email communication with the Eyak Preservation Council, which was conducting an Eyak language preservation project and Laura Bliss Spaan, a filmmaker of learning DVDs, and met her when she visited France. Later, Leduey contacted Michael E. Krauss, and in July 2010 he visited Cordova, Alaska, in the Eyak ancestral homelands, in order to get instructions and further training in Eyak. Under the academic assistance of Krauss, Leduey began analyzing Eyak tales. Together with Krauss, Bliss Spaan and the Eyak Preservation Council they are working to revive Eyak by publishing Eyak words and phrases on websites like Facebook and Twitter and helping Eyaks study their language. During his visit to Alaska, Leduey also studied Eyak traditions, including culinary ones.

== Links ==
- Ce que les langues disent de nous ・ Guillaume Leduey ・ TEDxBlois on YouTube
