= Point Whitshed =

Peninsula of Prince William Sound, Alaska, U.S.

Coordinates: 60.4478°N 145.8828°W

Point Whitshed (previously Witshed, Whitshet, and Punta de Orevilla) is a peninsula of Prince William Sound near Cordova in the U.S. state of Alaska.

== Geography ==
Whitshed is a low, wooded peninsula, presenting a cragged appearance to the sea, and reaching within about five miles of Point Bentinck. This intermediate five miles has been described by Johnstone as "a low, uninterrupted, barren sand as far as the eye could reach." It is an extensive flat of bluish yellow mud, covered with water during stormy days at flood tide; but at low tide no water is present. From Point Whitshed to the southward and eastward, there is a long line of piled ice, with dwarf trees marking the channel of Eyak River, extending out into the flats.

== History ==
Situated west of the mouth of the Copper River was named Witshed by George Vancouver in 1794 after Captain Witshed, R. N. It appears in the text of the original 4th edition of Vancouver's voyage, but in the accompanying atlas and in the text of the 8th edition of 1801, it is called Whitshed after Captain Whitshed. Whitshed appears to be in general use by the early 20th century. It has been erroneously printed Whitshet. The Spaniards in 1779 called it Punta de Orevilla. Fish camps were seasonally occupied by Eyak people at Point Whished.
