= Irene E. Ryan =

American aviator, engineer, geologist, government official, politician

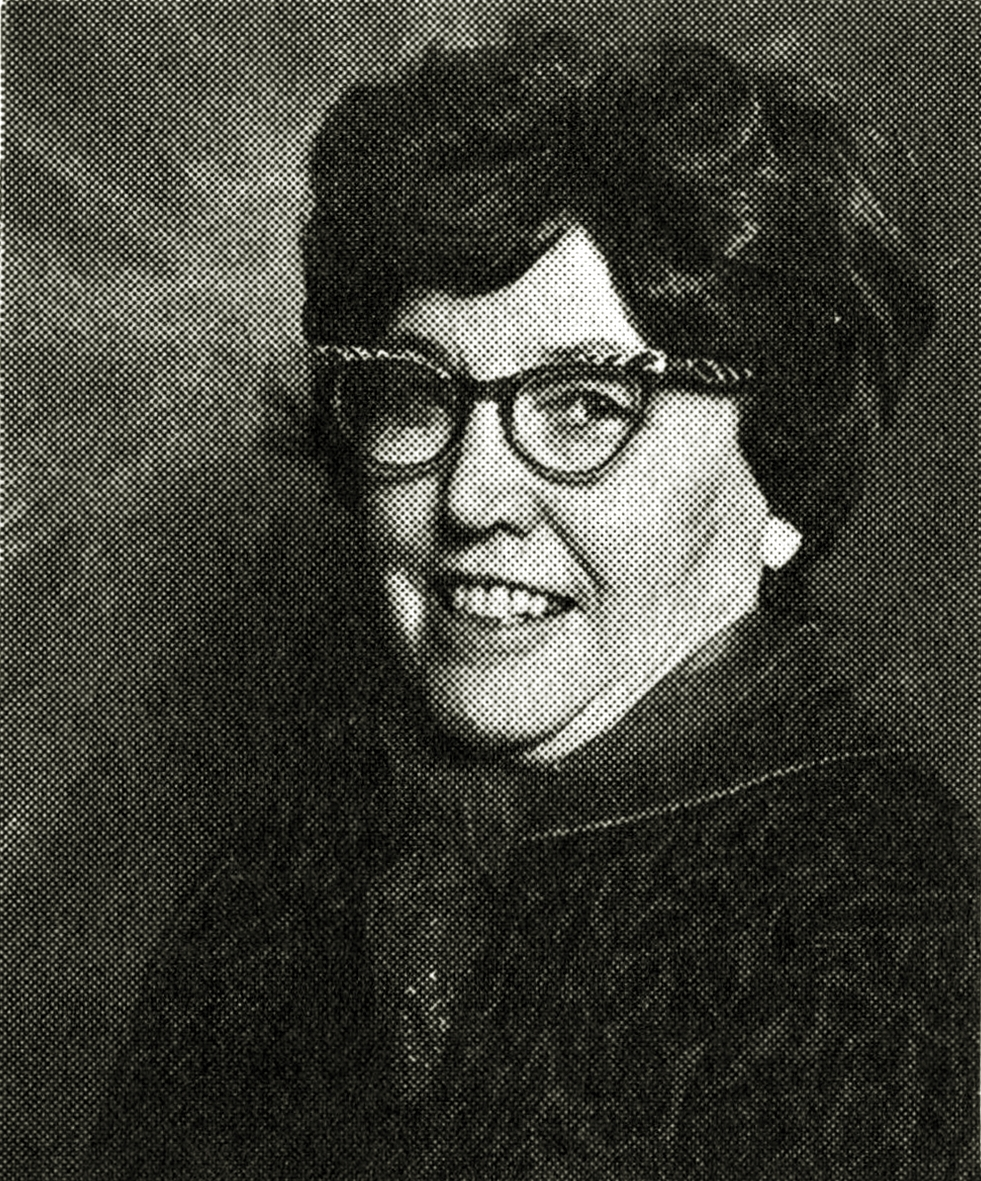
- Irene Ryan in 1973
- Born: Irene Esther Irvine; September 10, 1909; Boston, Massachusetts, US
- Died: November 23, 1997 (aged 88); Anchorage, Alaska, US
- Resting place: Angelus Memorial Park; 61.1147°N 149.8688°W
- Education: New Mexico Institute of Mining and Technology, B.S. in Geology
- Known for: Geologist, politician
- Political party: Democratic
- Spouse: John Edward "Pat" Ryan
- Children: 2
- Relatives: George Sharrock (in-law)

Irene Esther Ryan (née Irvine; September 10, 1909 – November 23, 1997) was an American geologist, aviator, and legislator during Alaska's history as both a United States territory and as a U.S. state. She was a member of the Alaska Territorial House of Representatives and of the Alaska State Senate. She was instrumental in the creation of the Alaska Oil and Gas Conservation Commission, which helped insure state revenue from oil and gas exploration carried out by outside entities.

Ryan was involved with the creation of the Anchorage International Airport. She was the first female pilot to solo in the Territory of Alaska, and the first woman to earn a geology degree from New Mexico Institute of Mining and Technology. She was inducted into the Alaska Women's Hall of Fame in 2011.

== Background and early life ==
Irene Esther Irvine was born in Boston, Massachusetts, on September 10, 1909. Her parents were Leonard Laukki Irvine and Esther Neiminen Irvine. While working in Texas, she heard stories about Alaska from an aviator uncle based in the territory. Aged 21, she relocated to Anchorage. She began flying lessons at Merrill Field east of Anchorage.

On June 23, 1932, she was certified as the first female aviator in the territory to solo. She briefly left Alaska to study at New Mexico Institute of Mining and Technology, where she earned a Bachelor of Science degree in geology, the first woman to do so at that institution. On February 19, 1938, she married fellow student John Edward "Pat" Ryan. In February 1941, she gave birth to their first child Marcella. A month later, the couple relocated back to Alaska, where the couple's other daughter Patricia was born.

== Career ==
Ryan's civilian career was largely as a consultant to Alaskan industries tied to her field of expertise. She was involved with development of the oil and gas exploration in the state, and the Skagway to Fairbanks pipeline. Ryan was responsible for the design of seventeen airports in Alaska, including Anchorage International Airport. In 1952, she invested her money in a housing project in Anchorage.

In 1955, Ryan was elected to the Alaska Territorial House of Representatives. In 1959, she became a member of the Alaska State Senate. It was during her years in the legislature when Ryan used her educational and professional background to benefit the welfare of her state. She used her influence to get the Alaska Oil and Gas Conservation Commission created in 1955, insuring the state's revenues from oil and gas exploration by outside entities. Governor William Allen Egan appointed Ryan as commissioner of the Department of Economic Development for the state of Alaska during his second term.

== Death and legacy ==
Irene E. Ryan died on November 23, 1997, aged 88, and was buried at Angelus Memorial Park in Anchorage. In 2011, she was inducted into the Alaska Women's Hall of Fame.
