= Eyak language =

Extinct Na-Dené language of US

Eyak
- Pronunciation: [ʔiːjaːq]
- Native to: United States
- Region: Cordova, Alaska
- Ethnicity: Eyak
- Extinct: January 21, 2008, with the death of Marie Smith Jones; L2: 1 fluent (Guillaume Leduey)
- Revival: early 2010s
- Language family: Na-Dené: Athabaskan–Eyak; Eyak
- Writing system: Latin

Official status
- Official language in: Alaska

Language codes
- ISO 639-3: eya
- Glottolog: eyak1241
- ELP: Eyak
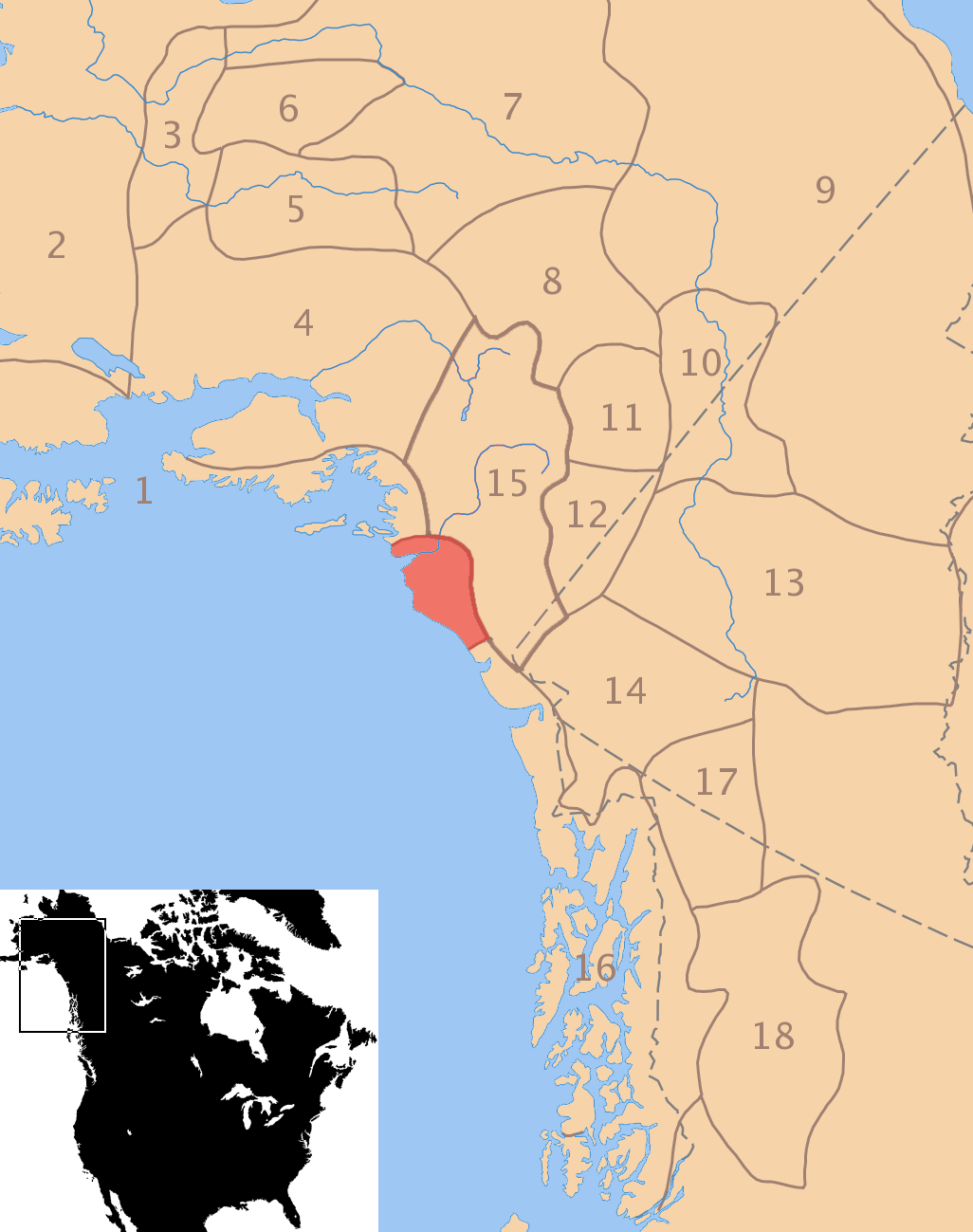
- Pre-contact distribution of Eyak

Eyak is an extinct and revived Na-Dené language, historically spoken by the Eyak people, indigenous to south-central Alaska, near the mouth of the Copper River. The name Eyak comes from a Chugach Sugpiaq name (Igya'aq) for an Eyak village at the mouth of the Eyak River. The last native speaker of Eyak was Marie Smith Jones, who died in 2008; however, Guillaume Leduey, who is engaged with the Eyak people in the revival of their language, learned the language himself to fluency.

The closest relatives of Eyak are the Athabaskan languages. The Eyak–Athabaskan group forms a basic division of the Na-Dené language family, the other being Tlingit.

Numerous Tlingit place names along the Gulf Coast are derived from names in Eyak; they have obscure or even nonsensical meanings in Tlingit, but oral tradition has maintained many Eyak etymologies. The existence of Eyak-derived Tlingit names along most of the coast towards southeast Alaska is strong evidence that the prehistoric range of Eyak was once far greater than it was at the time of European contact. This confirms both Tlingit and Eyak oral histories of migration throughout the region.

== Current status and revival ==
The last surviving native speaker was Marie Smith Jones (May 14, 1918 – January 21, 2008) of Cordova.

The spread of English and suppression of aboriginal languages are not the only reasons for the decline of the Eyak language. The northward migration of the Tlingit people around Yakutat in precontact times encouraged the use of Tlingit rather than Eyak along much of the Pacific Coast of Alaska. Eyak was also under pressure from its neighbors to the west, the Alutiiq people of Prince William Sound, as well as some pressure from the people of the Copper River valley. Eyak and Tlingit culture began to merge along the Gulf Coast, and a number of Eyak-speaking groups were absorbed by the Gulf Coast Tlingit populations. This resulted in the replacement of Eyak by Tlingit among most of the mixed groups after a few generations, as reported in Tlingit oral histories of the area.

=== Revival ===
In June 2010, the Anchorage Daily News published an article about Guillaume Leduey, a French college student with an unexpected connection to the Eyak language. Beginning at age 12, he had taught himself Eyak, utilizing print and audio instructional materials he obtained from the Alaska Native Language Center. During that time, he never traveled to Alaska or conversed with Marie Smith Jones, the last native speaker.

The month that the article was published, he traveled to Alaska and met with Dr. Michael Krauss, a noted linguist and Professor Emeritus at the University of Alaska Fairbanks. Dr. Krauss assisted Leduey with proper Eyak phonological pronunciation and assigned further instruction in grammar and morphology—including morphemic analyses of traditional Eyak stories.

In June 2011, Leduey returned to Alaska to facilitate Eyak language workshops in Anchorage and Cordova. He is now regarded as a fluent speaker, translator, and instructor of Eyak. Despite his fluency, Eyak remains classified as "dormant" as there are no native speakers. On the Expanded Graded Intergenerational Disruption Scale (EGIDS) Eyak is graded a 9 (dormant); the language serves as a reminder of heritage identity for an ethnic community, but no one has more than symbolic proficiency. Currently, Leduey provides instruction and curriculum assistance to the Eyak Language Project from France.

The Eyak Preservation Council received an Alaska Humanities Forum Grant that enabled them to start a website devoted to the preservation of the Eyak Language. Other funding supports the annual Eyak Culture Camp every August in Cordova. The Project provides countless language resources including immersion workshops, an online dictionary with audio samples, and a set of eLearning lessons, among others.

In June 2014, the Eyak Language Revitalization Project announced an online program called "dAXunhyuuga'", which means "the words of the people."

== Classification ==
Eyak is a part of the Eyak-Athabaskan language family and Na-Dené larger grouping, which includes Eyak-Athabaskan and Tlingit with a controversial but possible inclusion of Haida. The Athabaskan family covers three distinct geographic areas, forming three subgroups: Northern Athabaskan in Alaska and the Yukon; Pacific Coast Athabaskan in California and Oregon; and Southern Athabaskan, also called Apache, spoken mainly in the American Southwest, which includes Navajo. There has been extensive comparative reconstruction of a Proto-Athabaskan-Eyak (PAE). A recent proposal of a Dené–Yeniseian stock has been widely well received by linguists, linking the Dené languages to the Yeniseian languages of central Siberia. If it proves correct, it will be the first validated genetic link between Old and New World languages. Far less accepted is a possible Dené–Caucasian stock that has been pursued for decades.

== Phonology ==
The following charts are based on the material in Krauss (1965); IPA equivalents are shown in square brackets. The orthography used by Krauss is also used by the Eyak people. An alternative version uses ⟨ə ł x̣ g̣⟩ instead of ⟨A L X G⟩ for /ə ɬ χ q/, and ⟨j č š c cʼ⟩ instead of ⟨dj ch sh ts tsʼ⟩ for /t͡ʃ t͡ʃʱ ʃ t͡s t͡sʼ/ respectively.

=== Consonants ===
		Labial	Alveolar			Palato- alveolar	Velar		Uvular	Glottal
		Labial	plain	sibilant	lateral	Palato- alveolar	plain	labial	Uvular	Glottal
Stop	unaspirated	b ⟨b⟩ (Note: /b/ and /ŋ/ occur only in loanwords.)	t ⟨d⟩	ts ⟨dz⟩	tɬ ⟨dl⟩	tʃ ⟨dj⟩	k ⟨g⟩	kʷ ⟨gw⟩	q ⟨G⟩	
Stop	aspirated		tʰ ⟨t⟩	tsʰ ⟨ts⟩	tɬʰ ⟨tl⟩	tʃʰ ⟨ch⟩	kʰ ⟨k⟩		qʰ ⟨q⟩	
Stop	ejective		tʼ ⟨t’⟩	tsʼ ⟨ts’⟩	tɬʼ ⟨tl’⟩	tʃʼ ⟨ch’⟩	kʼ ⟨k’⟩		qʼ ⟨q’⟩	ʔ ⟨'⟩
Fricative				s ⟨s⟩	ɬ ⟨L⟩	ʃ ⟨sh⟩	x ⟨x⟩	xʷ ⟨xw⟩	χ ⟨X⟩	h ⟨h⟩
Sonorant		m ⟨m⟩ (Note: The nasals [n] and [m] occur in loanwords; in native words, Krauss (1965) suggests that they can be interpreted as /l/ and /w/ (respectively) followed by a nasalized vowel.)	n ⟨n⟩		l ⟨l⟩	j ⟨y⟩	ŋ ⟨ŋ⟩	w ⟨w⟩		

Aspirated stops contrast with unaspirated stops only before vowels.

All consonants may be found stem-initially, except /h/, which is interpreted as zero. /h/ has the allophone [h] only word-initially or directly following a vowel.

=== Vowels ===
Eyak has five vowel qualities /ɪ e a ə ʊ/, three of which also distinguish duration, nasalization, creaky voice (i.e. glottalization), and breathy voice (‘aspiration’ in Krauss's terminology). The vowel /ə/ only occurs as short and in modal voice, without nasalization. /a/ can also vary between [a] or [ɔ], and /e/ can vary between [e], [ɛ], or [æ]. Breathy voice vowels are all short /ɪ̤ e̤ a̤ ʊ̤/, although most of them can also be nasalized /ɪ̤̃ ã̤ ʊ̤̃/.

		Front				Central				Back			
		oral		nasal		oral		nasal		oral		nasal	
		short	long	short	long	short	long	short	long	short	long	short	long
Close	modal	ɪ	ɪː	ɪ̃	ɪ̃ː					ʊ	ʊː	ʊ̃	ʊ̃ː
Close	creaky	ɪ̰	ɪ̰ː	ɪ̰̃	ɪ̰̃ː					ʊ̰	ʊ̰ː	ʊ̰̃	ʊ̰̃ː
Close	breathy	ɪ̤		ɪ̤̃						ʊ̤		ʊ̤̃	
Mid	modal		eː			ə							
Mid	creaky	ḛ	ḛː										
Mid	breathy	e̤											
Open	modal						aː	ã	ãː				
Open	creaky					a̰	a̰ː	ã̰	ã̰ː				
Open	breathy					a̤		ã̤					

==== Writing vowels in Eyak ====
In the system developed to represent Eyak in writing, long vowels are represented by characters following the basic vowel: a colon <:> for long vowels, an apostrophe < ’> for glottalized (or creaky voice) vowels, an <h> for breathy voiced (“aspirated”) vowels and an <n> for nasalized vowels.

‘Unmodified’ (modal, oral)	Glottal (creaky voice)	‘Aspirated’ (breathy voice)	Long	Glottal long	Glottal nasal	‘Aspirated’ nasal	Long nasalized	Long glottalized nasal
i	i’	ih	i:	i:’	in’	inh	i:n	i:n’
A	e’	eh	e:	e:’				
A	a’	ah	a:	a:’	an’	anh	a:n	a:n’
u	u’	uh	u:	u:’	un’	unh	u:n	u:n’

=== Suprasegmentals ===
All syllables begin with an onset, so that no two vowels may occur consecutively. Only vowels can be the nuclei of syllables. Stems are heavy syllables, whereas affixes tend to be light.

Unlike many of the Athabascan languages to which it is related, Eyak is not tonal. It does not use variations in fundamental frequency (i.e. ‘pitch accents’) to convey contrast. Lexical stress usually falls on stems and/or heavy syllables. In sequences of heavy syllables, the stress falls on the penultimate syllable, as in qʼahdiʼlah /qʼa̤ˈtɪ̰la̤/ “goodbye”.

== Morphology ==
Eyak is an agglutinative, polysynthetic language.

=== Nouns ===
With few exceptions, Eyak nouns are morphophonemically invariable. Kinship and anatomical stems are the only noun stems that may take pronominal possessive prefixes, which are as follow:

- First person singular: si- (siya:q’e’, "my aunt [mother's sister]")
- Second person singular: ’i- (’ita:’, "your (sg.) father")
- Third person singular and plural: ’u-
- First person plural: qa:-
- Second person plural: lAX-
- Indefinite: k’u-
- Reciprocal: ’Ad-

=== Preverbals ===
Preverbals in Eyak are the category of words made up of preverbals and postpositions. The two are grouped together because one morpheme may often be used as the stem in both categories. Preverbals are individual words that occur in conjunction with the verb. These combinations may almost be said to form lexemes, especially due to the fact that preverbals are rarely if ever used in isolation in natural speech. Preverbals are nearly always unbound and are phonologically separate from the verb, contrasting with the corresponding class in Athabaskan which may be incorporated or not. One preverbal is most common, but combinations of two are equally possible, as in ’uya’ ’Adq’Ach’ k’udAdAGu’ "hot water bottle" (in it onto self something/someone is kept warm). There are more than 100 Eyak basic preverbal morphemes.

Postpositions relate directly to an object outside of the verb. Current analysis by Krauss has been phonological rather than semantic, but there is at least one semantically grouped category of postpositions to consider, that of comparatives. This grouping includes P-ga’ "like P", P-’u’X "less than P", and P-lAX "more than P" where P is any postpositional phrase. Eyak lacks conjunctions and many postpositions assume a similar function, creating subordinate clauses. These postpositions attach to the verb, the most common example being -da:X "and" or "if, when".

=== Verbs ===
Eyak verb stems take many affixes: there are nine prefix positions before the verb (many of which may be subdivided) and four suffix positions after. All positions may be filled with zero, except the stem, which can be filled by any of several hundred morphemes but not zero.

==== Verb template ====
Prefixes

1. Object
  1. Direct object: xu (1 sg.), ’i (2 sg.), ø~A (3 sg. and pl.), lAXi: (2 pl.), ’Ad(A) ~ ’Ad(u) (reflexive), ’i ~ ’i(dA) (indeterminate)
  2. Indefinite subject or object: k’u’
    - The indeterminate is used where there is no specific object (such as in intransitive verbs), while the indefinite is used where there is a specific but unspecified subject or object.
  3. Mark of semitransitive: ’~:
2. Tense/aspect/mood A (inceptive imperfect): qu’~qa’ ~ qe’ ~ qi’
3. ’i:lih ~ :lih
  - This position is filled only in a few verbs of thought or emotion, such as ilih
4. Plurality emphasizer: qA (subject and object)
5. Classificatory (nominal) and thematic (verbal) qualifiers: the most variable and characteristically Eyak affix position. gu, XA, lAXA, dA, yA, and lA may occur singly, the rest occur in combinations of two or three.
  1. GA, gu
  2. XA
  3. qi:, lAXA, ti:, ku:n, k’ush, tsin, tsi:
  4. dA, yA
  5. lA~:n
  - Only in position C. do the morphemes have specified meaning, and only nominally, for example: lAXA, "berry-like, ball-like, eye" or qi: + dA "foot". The other morphemes have unlimited, much broader meanings, but tend to concentrate in certain areas. They may be nominal classificatory or verbal thematic.
    - gu + lA is nominally classificatory and refers to liquid or viscous matter; when gu appears by itself it refers nominally to basket-roots, thread, or hair, (but not rope), as well as thematically with -L-qu, "chase".
    - XA + dA may nominally refer to matches or logs (but not sticks) or to clouds, among others. dA alone thematically refers to an unusually broad selection including but not limited to hunger, sleds, arrows, noises (only certain types), and non-solid round objects (including eggs, severed heads, and hearts).
    - This is a very limited sampling of the breadth of the meanings of the possible morphemes in position 5.
6. Tense/aspect/mood B1: GA, ø ~ A, : ~ A
7. Subject: xw (1 sg.), ø ~ y(i) (2 sg.), lAX (2 pl.), ø (all else)
8. Tense/aspect/mood B2: sA ~ s (perfective), (y)i ~ ø (inconclusive function)
9. Verb voice classifier: ø, dA ~ di, L, LA ~ Li

Verb stem

Suffixes

1. Derivational: g (habitual action), X ~ ø (progressive)
2. Aspectival: L (perfective); Derivational: k’ (customary)
3. Negative: G
4. Human subject or object of third person: inh (sg.), inu: (pl.); non-human object of imperative: uh

An artificial but grammatical example presents near-maximum affixal positions filled: dik’ lAXi:qAqi’dAxsLXa’Xch’gLG "I did not tickle your (plural, emphatically) feet." This gives:

- dik’, negative particle
- Prefix position 1: lAXi:, direct object, you pl.
- Position 4: qA, emphasizing plurality
- Positions 5C & D: qi’ + dA, pertaining to feet
- Position 6: ø, negative active perfective
- Position 7: x, 1st pers. sg. subject
- Position 8: s, perfective
- Position 9: L
- Stem: Xa’Xch’, tickle
- Suffix position 1: g, repetitive
- Position 2: L, perfective
- Position 3: G, negative

==== Tense, mood, and aspect ====
There are two moods, optative and imperative, and two aspects, perfective and imperfective. Verbs may be inceptive, 'active,' or 'neuter', such that the possibilities are as follows:

	Inceptive	Active	Neuter
Perfective	is doing, is becoming	did, became	is
Imperfective	will do, will become	is doing	is
Optative	let it do, let it become	let it do	let it become
Imperative	let it do!, let it become!	let it do!	let it be!

Morphemes in prefix position 2 modify the inceptive imperfective; in position 6 the perfective, optative, and imperative in inceptive, active and neuter; in position 8 the inceptive optative, active perfective and optative, and neuter perfective, imperfective, optative, and imperative; in suffix position 2 the inceptive, active, and neuter perfective; and in suffix position 3, negativity.

There are also three derivational modes, a repetitive, a customary, and a progressive. The infinitive takes approximately the same form as the imperative, with some variation.

== Syntax ==
The majority of the Eyak corpus is narrative, with very little spontaneous conversation (and that only when embedded in the narratives). There is a better understanding therefore of the syntax of Eyak narrative style and performance than of natural speech. The basic word order of Eyak is subject-object-verb, or SOV, as in "Johnny ’uyAqa’ts’ sALxut’L" "Johnny shot his (own) hand." Relatively few sentences, however, follow this exact pattern; it is far more common to find SV or OV. The full word order of a transitive sentence is I S O [[C P] V]:

- I, introductory sector: consists of two parts, a connective (e.g. 'and so,' 'then,' etc.) and one or more adverbs, especially temporal and spatial adverbs.
- S, subject
- O, object
- V, verb sector: includes two subsectors in addition to the verb.
  - C, complement subsector: in Eyak syntax a complement is a noun or noun phrase (e.g. not a demonstrative pronoun) and does not have the same meaning as the usual use of 'complement' in ordinary syntax. This is due to traditional classifications of Eyak.
  - P, preverbal subsector: includes preverbals (preverbs and postpositions) and pronouns.

The subject and object categories can consist of a noun, a noun phrase, or a demonstrative phrase. All constituents may be filled by zero, excepting the verb.

== Bibliography ==
- Hund, Andrew (2004). "Eyak". Encyclopedia of the Arctic. Taylor and Francis. ISBN 1-57958-436-5.
- Krauss, Michael E. (1965). "Eyak: a preliminary report". Alaska Native Language Archive. University of Alaska, Fairbanks.
- Krauss, Michael E., ed. (1982). In Honor of Eyak: The Art of Anna Nelson Harry. Fairbanks: Alaska Native Language Center. ISBN 0-933769-03-2.
- Krauss, Michael E. (2004). "Athabaskan tone". In Hargus, Sharon; Rice, Keren (eds.). Athabaskan Prosody. Current Issues in Linguistic Theory. Vol. 269. Amsterdam: John Benjamins. pp. 51–136. ISBN 90-272-4783-8. Based on an unpublished manuscript dated 1979.
- Krauss, Michael E.; Leer, Jeff (1981). Athabaskan, Eyak, and Tlingit Sonorants. Alaska Native Language Center. ISBN 0-933769-35-0.
- Kolbert, Elizabeth (June 6, 2005). "Last Words, A Language Dies". New Yorker.
