= Cordova Junior/Senior High School =

Coordinates: 60°32′26″N 145°45′32″W

Cordova Jr/Sr High School

Location
- 100 Fisherman Avenue; Cordova, Alaska 99574; United States

Information
- Type: Public
- School district: Cordova School District
- CEEB code: 020015
- Principal: Kate Williams
- Enrollment: 135 (2023–2024)
- Color(s): Silver, blue, and white
- Mascot: The Wolverine
- Website: www.cordovasd.org/CJS

Cordova Jr/Sr High School, also known as Cordova High School (CHS) is a joint junior and senior high school located in Cordova, Alaska. It serves grades seven through twelve. It is a part of the Cordova School District.
