= KCDV =

- Cordova, Alaska; United States
- Broadcast area: South Central Alaska
- Frequency: 100.9 MHz
- Branding: The Eagle

Programming
- Format: Adult contemporary

Ownership
- Owner: Bayview Communications Inc.
- Sister stations: KLAM

History
- First air date: April 19, 1997

Technical information
- Licensing authority: FCC
- Facility ID: 56492
- Class: A
- ERP: 1,200 watts
- HAAT: -127 meters
- Transmitter coordinates: 60°32′19.1″N 145°45′43.2″W

Links
- Public license information: Public file; LMS
- Website: cordovaradio.com

KCDV, The Eagle, is a commercial adult contemporary music radio station in Cordova, Alaska, United States, broadcasting on 100.9 FM. The station started broadcasting on April 19, 1997, under the management of Bayview Communications. KCDV plays a mix of music from the 1980s and onwards.

== History ==
Before KCDV started broadcasting in 1997, the main station in the Cordova area was KLAM AM, broadcasting a range of genres including 80's, classic rock and country, along with news and sport.

== Technical ==
The station broadcasts on 100.9 FM at 970 watts with a range of approximately 27 miles. KCDV broadcasts in high fidelity stereo.
