= Mount Eyak =

Ski area in Alaska, United States

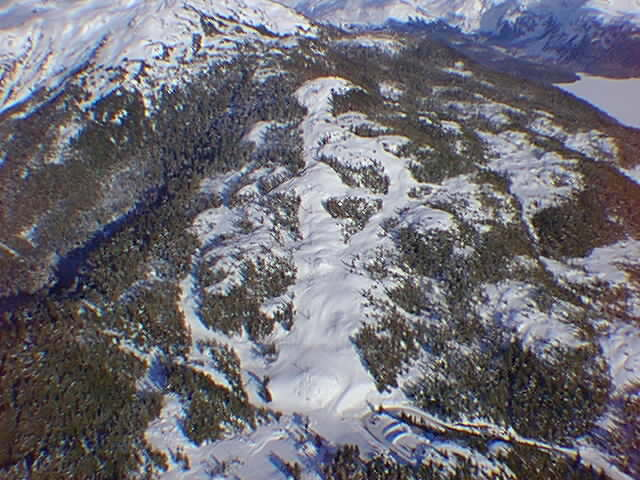
- Aerial view of Mount Eyak ski area

- Location in Alaska Mount Eyak (North America)
- Location: Cordova, Alaska
- Coordinates: 60°33′0″N 145°45′0″W
- Vertical: 849 ft (259 m)
- Top elevation: 1,261 ft (384 m)
- Base elevation: 412 ft (126 m)
- Trails: 10
- Longest run: 4,200 ft (1,300 m)
- Lift system: 2 (1 single chair, 1 rope tow)
- Snowfall: 350 inches

Mount Eyak is a ski area located in Cordova, Alaska. It is operated by the Sheridan Ski Club.

== History ==
In 1948, the Sheridan Ski Club was started and local skiers set up a rope tow near the present-day Mews Apartments. The club even had a lighted hill for nighttime skiing.

The next improvement came in 1966, when a car chassis was modified to drive the rope tow. There is still a rope tow located in the same spot but it has been upgraded numerous times over the years. The rope tow works the current "bunny hill" and transports skiers from the main lift to the rental room and the other buildings.

In 1973, the City of Cordova got a $95,000 grant from BOR and a $52,000 grant from the Roads and Trails Grant fund. These grants, plus the city's commitment of funds and the Sheridan Ski Club's contributions of approximately $29,000 and volunteer labor, were used to construct present-day facilities.

Mount Eyak is currently serviced by a single chairlift (as well as the rope tow). The chairlift was purchased from Sun Valley, Idaho, and transported by train to Seattle, then by ferry to Cordova. The Sheridan Ski Club painted the towers and repaired the chairs before the U.S. Army used its helicopters to put the towers in place in 1974. The single chair lift was originally constructed in 1939 and serviced Bald Mountain. It is the oldest working chairlift in North America and one of only two single chairs still in operation. The other is located at Mad River Glen, Vermont.

== Services ==
Services include a rental room with skis and snowboard, a heated lounge with concessions, and a first aid room. The hill provides emergency medical care with a volunteer ski patrol.
