= Cordova School District =

School district in Alaska, United States

Address
- 675 Second Street Cordova, Alaska, 99574; United States

District information
- Type: Public
- Grades: Pre-K–12
- NCES District ID: 0200060

Students and staff
- Students: 361
- Teachers: 28.01
- Staff: 66.99
- Student–teacher ratio: 12.89

Other information
- Website: www.cordovasd.org

Cordova School District (CSD) is a school district headquartered in Cordova, Alaska. It operates two schools, Mt. Eccles Elementary School and Cordova Jr./Sr. High School.
