= Angelus Memorial Park =

Cemetery in Anchorage Borough, Alaska

- Interactive map of Angelus Memorial Park

Details
- Established: 1951–1952
- Location: Anchorage, Alaska
- Country: United States
- Coordinates: 61°06′53″N 149°52′08″W
- Type: Non-profit
- Owned by: Angelus Memorial Park, Inc.
- Size: 37 acres (15 ha)
- No. of graves: >6,000
- Website: www.AngelusMemorial.org
- Find a Grave: Angelus Memorial Park
- The Political Graveyard: Angelus Memorial Park

Angelus Memorial Park, previously known as Evergreen Memorial Cemetery, is located in Anchorage, Alaska. Marie Smith Jones, last Native speaker of the Eyak language, is buried there.

== See also ==
- List of cemeteries in Alaska
