= KLAM =

- Cordova, Alaska; United States
- Frequency: 1450 kHz
- Branding: The Clam

Programming
- Format: Country/Classic rock/Talk
- Affiliations: ABC Radio Network, Coast to Coast AM

Ownership
- Owner: Bayview Communications, Inc.
- Sister stations: KCDV

History
- First air date: May 2, 1954
- Call sign meaning: Cordova's reputation for being the "Clam Capital of the World"

Technical information
- Facility ID: 56491
- Class: B
- Power: 250 watts (unlimited)
- Transmitter coordinates: 60°32′18.1″N 145°45′42.1″W

Links
- Website: KLAM Online

KLAM (1450 AM, "The Clam") is a radio station licensed to serve Cordova, Alaska. The station is owned by Bayview Communications, Inc. It airs a Classic rock/Country music and Talk radio format.

The station has been assigned these call letters by the Federal Communications Commission since 1954.

In the movie Stand By Me, KLAM is featured as a fictional radio station from Portland, Oregon.
