= Adawulcanak =

Northwestern tribal deity

Adawulcanak (Old-Man-Who-Foresees-All-the-Troubles-of-the-World) is a deity of the Northwestern tribes. He, along with Tliewatuwadjigican, are servants of the daughter of Nascakiyetl.
