= List of mayors of Cordova, Alaska =

This is a list of mayors of Cordova in the state of Alaska in the United States. The City of Cordova was incorporated on July 8, 1909.

Name	Term	Notes
George Hazelet	c. 1909	First mayor of Cordova
Will H. Chase	1910	
Austin E. Lathrop	1911–1912	Ran for city council and was named mayor by virtue of being to top vote-getter in the election. Lathrop declined any more terms as mayor, but continued serving on the council until 1914
Will H. Chase	1928, 1932, 1934	Multiple sources state he served as mayor of Cordova for 24 terms, not necessarily consecutive, though. Born in 1874 and died in 1965. Served 18 years as mayor by 1952. By 1911 he had already served as mayor in some capacity. By 1938 he had already served 12 times as mayor. Was elected mayor in 1910 along with a "practically new council."
Richard Davis	1949	
Barney Anderson	1961	
John Stotera LeFevre	1961–1963	
Melvin Soder	1965	
Arthur P. Knight	1971	
Jim Poor	1975	
Erling Johansen	1985 – 1989	
Bob Van Brocklin	1989 – 1990	Committed suicide several years after the oil spill.
Kelly Weaverling	1991–1993	First Green Party mayor in U.S.
Margy Johnson	1993–1999	First woman elected mayor of Cordova
Ed Zeine	1999 – 2000	
Margy Johnson	2001 – 2002	
Nancy Bird	2003	"... served for about 4 months as Acting Mayor in 2003."
Timothy L. Joyce	March 2004 – March 2010	
James Kallander	March 2010 – March 2013	
Jim Kasch	March 2013 – March 2016	
Clay Koplin	March 2016 – present	
