= Marie Smith Jones =

Last native speaker of Eyak (1918–2008)

- udAch' k'uqAXA'a'ch'

Eyak Nation leader

Personal details
- Born: May 14, 1918 Cordova, Territory of Alaska
- Died: January 21, 2008 (aged 89) Anchorage, Alaska
- Resting place: Angelus Memorial Park; Anchorage, Alaska
- Spouse: William F. Smith (m. 1948)
- Children: 9
- Known for: Last surviving speaker of the Eyak language; honorary chief of the Eyak Nation, and the last remaining full-blooded Eyak.

Marie Smith Jones (May 14, 1918 – January 21, 2008, 'udAch' k'uqAXA'a'ch' Eyak pronunciation: [ʔutət͡ʃ’ k’uqəχəʔaˀt͡ʃ’] 'a sound that calls people from afar') was an American woman who was the last surviving speaker of the Eyak language of Southcentral Alaska. She was born in Cordova, Alaska, was an honorary chief of the Eyak Nation and the last remaining full-blooded Eyak.

== Biography ==
Jones married a fisherman, William F. Smith, on May 5, 1948. Although she had nine children with Smith, they did not learn to speak Eyak due to the social stigma associated with it at the time. She moved to Anchorage in the 1970s. So that a record of the Eyak language would survive, she worked with linguist Michael E. Krauss, who compiled a dictionary and grammar of it. Her last older sibling died in the 1990s. Afterwards, Jones became politically active, and on two occasions she spoke at the United Nations on the issues of peace and indigenous languages. She was also active regarding environmental Indian issues, including clearcutting. Jones suffered from alcoholism earlier in her life, but gave up drinking while in her early 50s; she remained a heavy smoker until her death. She died of natural causes on January 21, 2008, at age 89 at her home in Anchorage. NPR also released an obituary where they have a clip of her reciting an Eyak prayer.

== See also ==
- Language death
- Linguistic rights
