= Eyak =

Indigenous group in Alaska

’i:ya:GdAlahGAyu:
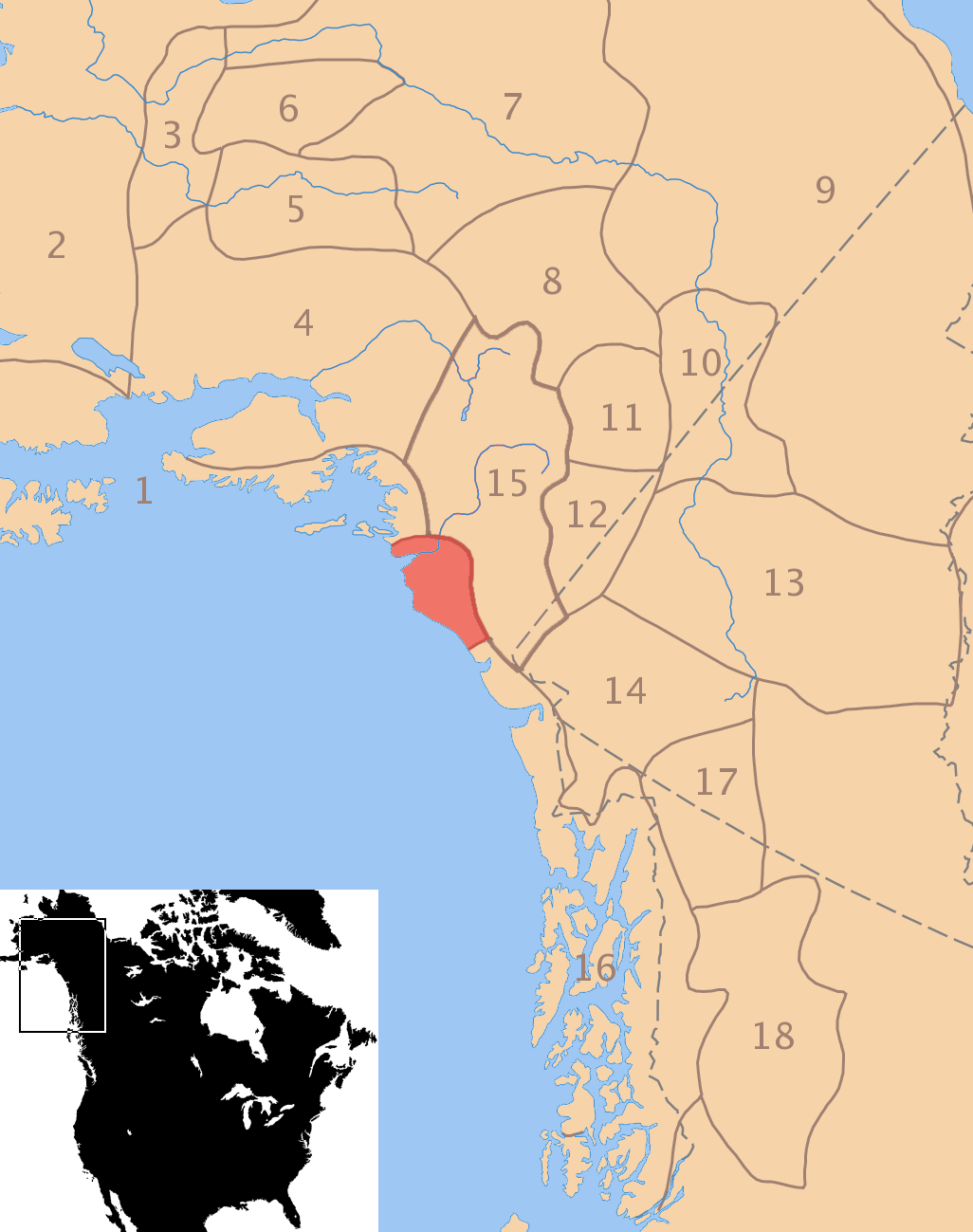
- Eyak territory in the 18th century

Regions with significant populations
- Alaska, United States: 428

Languages
- English, Eyak (historical), Tlingit (historical)

Religion
- Christianity

Related ethnic groups
- Tlingit, Ahtna, Chugach Sugpiaq

The Eyak (Eyak: ’i:ya:GdAlahGAyu: Eyak pronunciation: [ʔɪːjaːqtəla̤qəjʊː] are an Alaska Native people historically located on the Copper River Delta and near the town of Cordova, Alaska. They are Indigenous peoples of the Northwest Coast. Today, Eyak people live in Cordova, Yakutat, across Alaska, and the U.S.

Many Eyak descendants do not qualify to be tribal members in the Native Village of Eyak, a federally recognized Alaska Native tribe which was established through the Alaska Native Claims Settlement Act in 1971. This is due to the enrollment qualifications that extend tribal citizenship only to those who reside in the town of Cordova for the majority of the year.

== Name ==
In the Eyak language, their ethnonym is ’i:ya:GdAlahGAyu:. The name ’i:ya:G originally referred specifically to a single Eyak village at Mile 6, and originates from the Alutiiq language of the Chugach people. The original etymology is uncertain, but the name perhaps means "hiding spot" or "river mouth." ’i:ya:GdAlahGAyu: originally only was the name of the people living in the Mile 6 village, but was extended under English influence to refer to all Eyak people.

== Territory ==
Historical Eyak territory reached from present-day Cordova east to the Martin River and north to Miles Glacier.

There were four main villages:

- Alaganik, near Mile 21 of the present-day Copper River Highway
- Eyak, located near Mile 5.5
- unnamed, 800 yards south of Eyak
- Orca, located within present-day Cordova

In addition to these villages the Eyak would seasonally occupy fish camps at Point Whitshed and Mountain Slough.

== History ==
The Eyak initially moved out of the interior down the Copper River to the coast. There they harvested the rich salmon fishing grounds. When the Russians arrived they recognized the Eyak as a distinct culture and described their territory on their maps. They also traded with the Eyak and sent them missionaries. Because of their small population, they were often raided and their territory boundaries were under pressure from the Chugach to the west. The Tlingit on the east side, had better relations with the Eyak leading to intermarriage and the assimilation of most Eyak. The Eyak's territorial boundary was pushed further contributing to the Eyak's decline. When the Americans arrived they opened canneries and competed with the Eyak for salmon. The integration and novel diseases which were introduced by non-Native settlers led to the further decline of the Eyak.

As populations decreased the remaining Eyak began to congregate near the village of Orca. In 1880 the population of the village of Alaganik was recorded at 117 and by 1890 it had declined to 48. In 1900 total population was estimated at 60. As more settlers arrived the last village became the town of Cordova. As of 1996, there were 120 partial Eyak descendants in the town. The last full-blood Eyak, Marie Smith Jones, died on January 21, 2008.

== Language ==
The Eyak spoke a distinct language that is related to the Athabaskan languages. Pressure from neighboring ethnic groups and the spread of English resulted in a decline of the Eyak language. Marie Smith Jones (1918–2008) was the last native speaker. The linguist Michael Krauss was a renowned Eyak language specialist who worked alongside Jones and other speakers to describe it.

== Notable Eyak people ==
- Marie Smith Jones, was the last first-language speaker of the Eyak language
