= Cordova, Alaska =

City in Alaska, United States

Cordova
- City
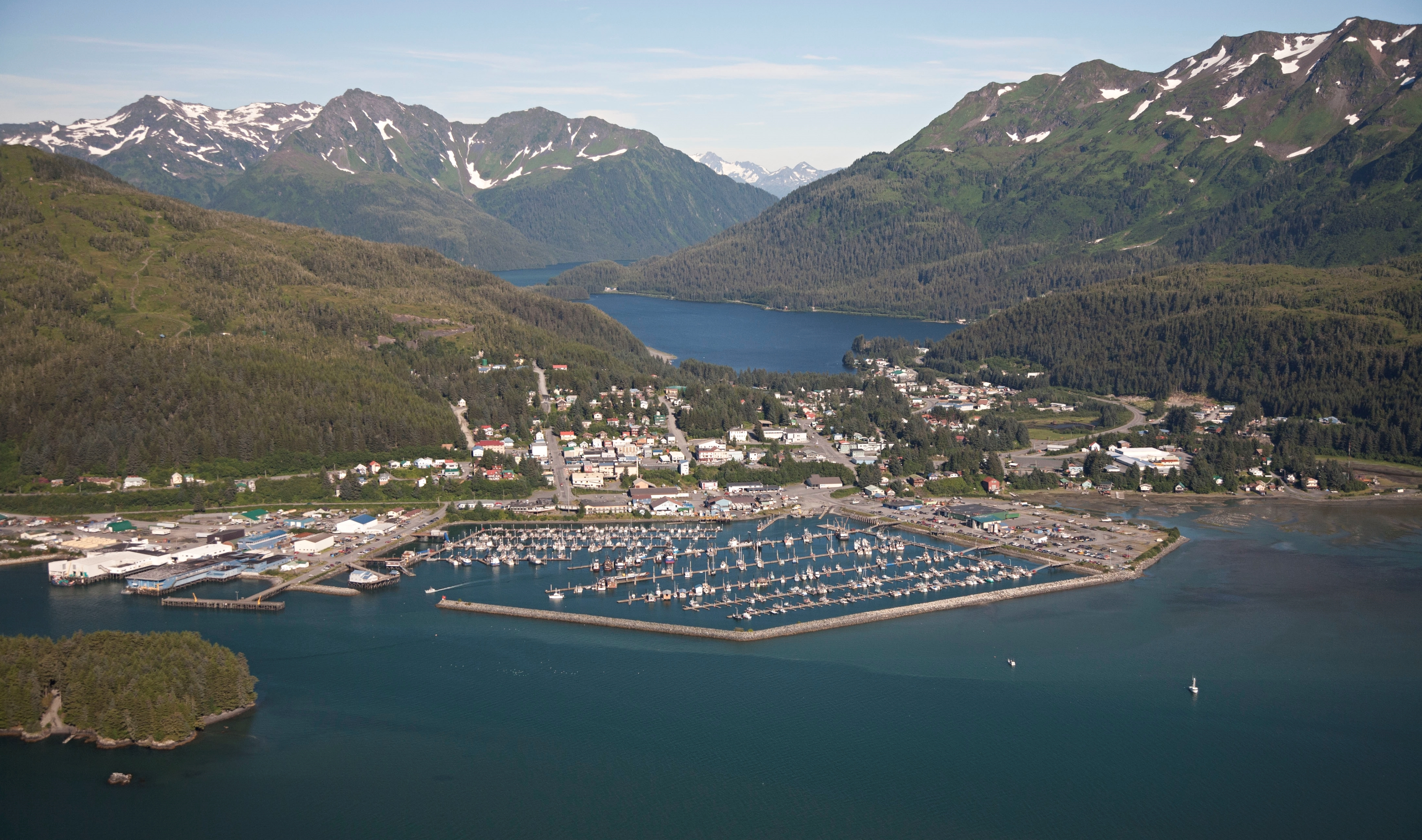
- Aerial view of central Cordova, Eyak Lake and the portion of the Chugach Mountains surrounding the city.
- Nickname: The Crossroads of Alaska
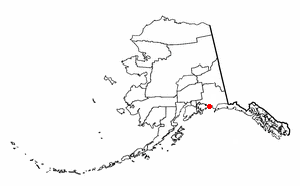
- Location of Cordova, Alaska
- Coordinates: 60°32′37″N 145°45′07″W
- Country: United States
- State: Alaska
- Census Area: Chugach
- Incorporated: July 8, 1909

Government
  - Mayor: Kristin Smith
  - State senator: Gary Stevens (R)
  - State rep.: Louise Stutes (R)

Area
  - Total: 75.14 sq mi (194.62 km^{2})
  - Land: 61.35 sq mi (158.89 km^{2})
  - Water: 13.80 sq mi (35.73 km^{2})
- Elevation: 82 ft (25 m)

Population (2020)
  - Total: 2,609
  - Density: 42.5/sq mi (16.42/km^{2})
- Time zone: UTC-9 (Alaska (AKST))
  - Summer (DST): UTC-8 (AKDT)
- ZIP code: 99574
- Area code: 907
- FIPS code: 02-17410
- GNIS feature ID: 1421215
- Website: CityofCordova.net

Cordova (/kɔːrˈdoʊvə, ˈkɔːrdəvə/ kor-DOH-və, KOR-də-və) is a port city in Chugach Census Area, (Note: The Chugach Census Area was established in 2019 by the split of the former Valdez–Cordova Census Area.) Alaska, United States. It lies near the mouth of the Copper River, at the head of Orca Inlet on the east side of Prince William Sound. The population was 2,609 at the 2020 census, up from 2,239 in 2010.

No roads connect Cordova to any other Alaskan communities (besides Eyak), so a plane or ferry is required to travel there.

== History ==
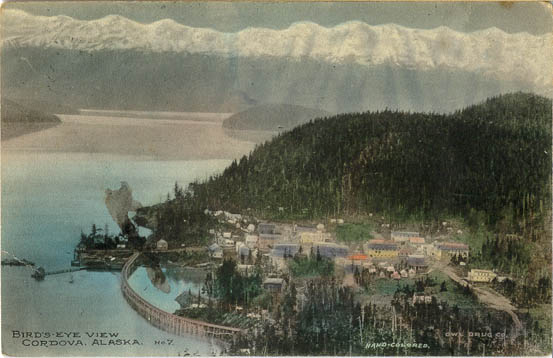
1910 postcard of Cordova, Alaska.

In 1790, the inlet in front of the current Cordova townsite was named Puerto Cordova by Spanish explorer Salvador Fidalgo. The city of Cordova was named after it, although the inlet itself was later renamed the Orca Inlet. Cordova proper was founded as a result of the discovery of high-grade copper ore at Kennecott, north of Cordova. A group of surveyors from Valdez laid out a town site and Michael James Heney purchased half the land for the terminus of the Copper River and Northwestern Railway after determining that the neighboring town of Katalla was a poor harbor. Heney and his crew held a brief ceremony to organize the town on March 26, 1906. A week later, crews arrived to begin work on the railroad. The first lots in the new town site, making up the heart of present-day Cordova, were sold at auction in May 1908. As the railroad grew, so did the town. Eventually schools, businesses, a hospital, and utilities were established. After the railroad was completed, Cordova became the transportation hub for the ore coming out of Kennecott. From 1911 to 1938, more than 200 million tons of copper ore were transported through Cordova.

In 1913, Rex Beach's The Iron Trail: An Alaskan Romance, a bestselling novel set against the construction of the Copper River and Northwestern Railway, made Cordova one of the territory's most famous place names.

On July 17, 1923, less than three weeks before his death in San Francisco, President Warren G. Harding and a large Presidential party aboard the U.S.S. Henderson visited Cordova as part of his "Voyage of Understanding" tour of Alaska. According to his biographer Francis Russell, the town was "ablaze with flags for the great occssion, even though the President and (his wife) had to ride through the waving streets in the only available transportation−an Army truck."

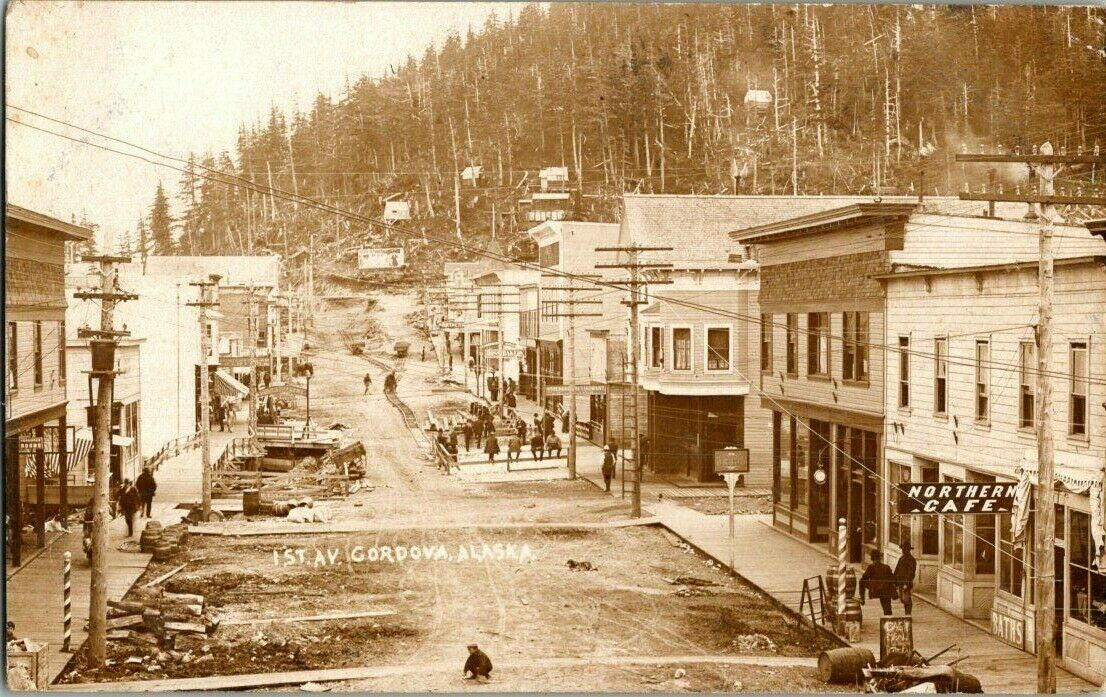
Cordova, Alaska as shown in a postcard dated January 26, 1907

The area around Cordova was historically home to the Eyak, with a population of Chugach to the west, and occasional visits from Ahtna and Tlingit people for trade or battle. The last fluent Eyak speaker Marie Smith Jones died in 2008, but the native people, as well as their traditions and lifestyle, continue to thrive in the region.

Cordova was also once the home of a booming razor clam industry. Between 1916 and the late 1950s, it was known as the "Razor Clam Capital of the World". Commercial harvest in the area reached as high as 3.5 million pounds. Returns began declining in the late 1950s, presumably due to overharvesting and a large die-off in 1958. The 1964 Good Friday earthquake effectively obliterated the industry; in some areas, the ground was thrust up by as much as six feet, exposing the already depleted clam beds. There has been no commercial harvest in the area since 1988 with the exception of a brief harvest in 1993.

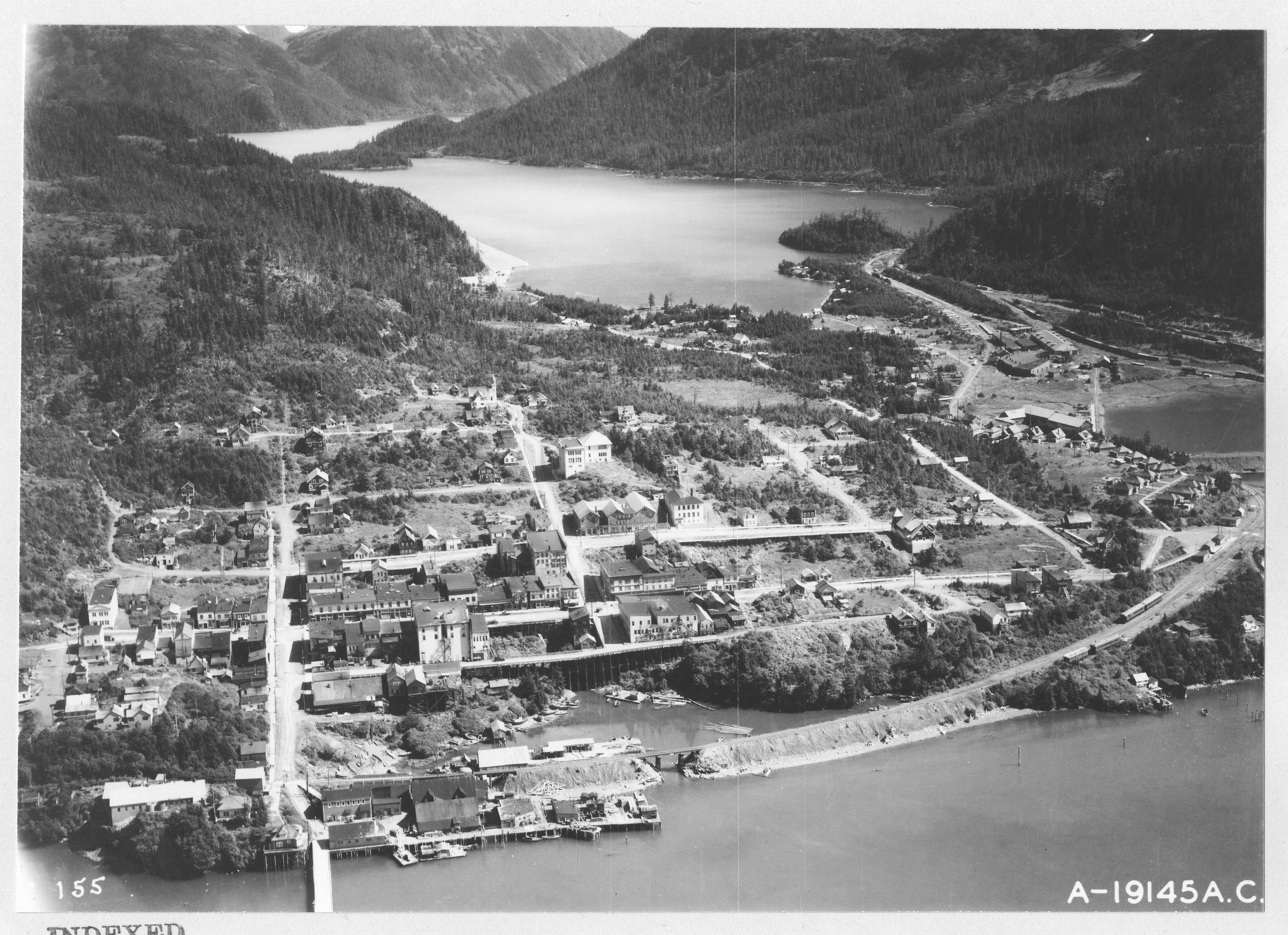
View of Cordova in 1941

In March 1989 the Exxon Valdez oil tanker ran aground on Bligh Reef north of Cordova causing one of the most devastating environmental disasters in North America. The Exxon Valdez oil spill severely affected the area's salmon and herring populations leading to a recession of the local fishing-reliant economy as well as a disruption to the area's ecology. After many years of litigation, 450 million dollars were awarded for compensatory and punitive damages.

== Demographics ==
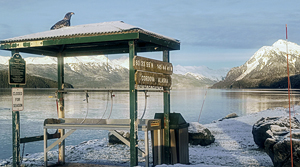
Eagle on fish cleaning station Cordova Alaska

Historical population
Census	Pop.	Note	%±
1910	1,152		—
1920	955		−17.1%
1930	980		2.6%
1940	938		−4.3%
1950	1,165		24.2%
1960	1,128		−3.2%
1970	1,164		3.2%
1980	1,879		61.4%
1990	2,110		12.3%
2000	2,454		16.3%
2010	2,239		−8.8%
2020	2,609		16.5%
U.S. Decennial Census

Cordova first appeared on the 1910 U.S. Census as an incorporated city. It incorporated the year before in 1909.

=== 2020 census ===
As of the 2020 census, Cordova had a population of 2,609. The median age was 39.4 years. 21.4% of residents were under the age of 18 and 15.9% of residents were 65 years of age or older. For every 100 females there were 111.6 males, and for every 100 females age 18 and over there were 113.0 males age 18 and over.

0.0% of residents lived in urban areas, while 100.0% lived in rural areas.

There were 1,008 households in Cordova, of which 29.5% had children under the age of 18 living in them. Of all households, 47.0% were married-couple households, 23.0% were households with a male householder and no spouse or partner present, and 20.8% were households with a female householder and no spouse or partner present. About 30.6% of all households were made up of individuals and 10.1% had someone living alone who was 65 years of age or older.

There were 1,143 housing units, of which 11.8% were vacant. The homeowner vacancy rate was 0.5% and the rental vacancy rate was 6.4%.

Racial composition as of the 2020 census
Race	Number	Percent
White	1,641	62.9%
Black or African American	10	0.4%
American Indian and Alaska Native	239	9.2%
Asian	372	14.3%
Native Hawaiian and Other Pacific Islander	7	0.3%
Some other race	41	1.6%
Two or more races	299	11.5%
Hispanic or Latino (of any race)	113	4.3%

=== 2010 census ===
As of the 2010 United States census, there were 2,239 people living in the city. The racial makeup of the city was 68.3% White, 0.4% Black, 8.7% Native American, 10.7% Asian, <0.1% Pacific Islander and 7.6% from two or more races. 4.2% were Hispanic or Latino of any race.

=== 2000 census ===
As of the census of 2000, there were 2,454 people, 958 households, and 597 families living in the city. The population density was 40.0 per square mile (15.4/km^{2}). There were 1,099 housing units at an average density of 17.9 per square mile (6.9/km^{2}). The racial makeup of the city was 71.1% White, 23.6% Alaska Native and other Native American, 10.1% Asian, 0.4% Black or African American, 1.3% from other races, and 6.7% from two or more races. Hispanics or Latinos of any race were 3.1% of the population.

There were 958 households, out of which 36.1% had children under the age of 18 living with them, 49.5% were married couples living together, 8.1% had a female householder with no husband present, and 37.6% were non-families. 30.3% of all households were made up of individuals, and 5.4% had someone living alone who was 65 years of age or older. The average household size was 2.48 and the average family size was 3.17.

The age distribution was 28.0% under the age of 18, 7.1% from 18 to 24, 32.8% from 25 to 44, 25.4% from 45 to 64, and 6.8% who were 65 years of age or older. The median age was 37 years. For every 100 females, there were 119.5 males. For every 100 females age 18 and over, there were 120.4 males.

The median income for a household in the city was $50,114, and the median income for a family was $65,625. Males had a median income of $40,444 versus $26,985 for females. The per capita income for the city was $25,256. About 4.3% of families and 7.5% of the population were below the poverty line, including 8.2% of those under the age of 18 and 6.2% of those 65 and older.

== Geography ==
Cordova is located within the Chugach National Forest at 60°32′34.1″N 145°45′36.59″W (60.542805, −145.760164). According to the United States Census Bureau, the city has a total area of 75.6 square miles (196 km^{2}), of which, 61.4 square miles (159 km^{2}) of it is land and 14.3 square miles (37 km^{2}) of it is water. The total area is 18.87% water.

=== Climate ===
Cordova has a maritime-influenced subarctic climate (Köppen Dfc) bordering on both a humid continental climate (Dfb) and a subpolar oceanic climate (Cfc), characterised by cool to mild, rainy summers and moderately cold, snowy winters. Precipitation is very heavy year round. The cool temperatures and heavy rainfall are caused by orographic lift. Westerly winds coming off the North Pacific Ocean are forced upwards by the Chugach Mountains which causes the air mass to cool and creates clouds and precipitation.

Yearly average precipitation is 148.37 inches (3,769 mm), with 125 rainy days out of the year. Snow falls mostly from December to March, and an average of 127 inches or 3.2 metres falls yearly. Winter temperatures reach lows of 15 °F or −9.4 °C and the warmest summer temperatures are around 77 °F or 25 °C.

Most official climate data is recorded at the airport, which is 11 miles from the settlement. Temperatures and precipitation vary drastically between the city and the airport, and precipitation at the city is commonly twice that of the airport.

Climate data for Cordova, Alaska (1991–2020 normals, extremes 1909–present)
Month	Jan	Feb	Mar	Apr	May	Jun	Jul	Aug	Sep	Oct	Nov	Dec	Year
Record high °F (°C)	59 (15)	58 (14)	68 (20)	74 (23)	82 (28)	90 (32)	89 (32)	86 (30)	78 (26)	72 (22)	60 (16)	66 (19)	90 (32)
Mean maximum °F (°C)	47.0 (8.3)	46.6 (8.1)	49.5 (9.7)	58.9 (14.9)	70.1 (21.2)	74.8 (23.8)	74.5 (23.6)	73.8 (23.2)	66.5 (19.2)	56.7 (13.7)	49.3 (9.6)	46.0 (7.8)	78.9 (26.1)
Mean daily maximum °F (°C)	33.7 (0.9)	36.7 (2.6)	39.1 (3.9)	46.5 (8.1)	54.1 (12.3)	59.4 (15.2)	61.6 (16.4)	61.9 (16.6)	56.4 (13.6)	47.5 (8.6)	38.4 (3.6)	35.3 (1.8)	47.5 (8.6)
Daily mean °F (°C)	26.4 (−3.1)	29.1 (−1.6)	30.8 (−0.7)	38.1 (3.4)	45.5 (7.5)	51.4 (10.8)	54.6 (12.6)	54.1 (12.3)	48.4 (9.1)	40.1 (4.5)	31.6 (−0.2)	28.9 (−1.7)	39.9 (4.4)
Mean daily minimum °F (°C)	19.0 (−7.2)	21.4 (−5.9)	22.5 (−5.3)	29.8 (−1.2)	36.8 (2.7)	43.5 (6.4)	47.6 (8.7)	46.4 (8.0)	40.3 (4.6)	32.7 (0.4)	24.8 (−4.0)	22.4 (−5.3)	32.3 (0.2)
Mean minimum °F (°C)	−2.2 (−19.0)	2.1 (−16.6)	5.3 (−14.8)	18.1 (−7.7)	27.3 (−2.6)	34.0 (1.1)	38.6 (3.7)	36.0 (2.2)	28.3 (−2.1)	19.4 (−7.0)	7.9 (−13.4)	3.2 (−16.0)	−7.1 (−21.7)
Record low °F (°C)	−30 (−34)	−33 (−36)	−24 (−31)	−9 (−23)	19 (−7)	23 (−5)	33 (1)	23 (−5)	20 (−7)	−1 (−18)	−17 (−27)	−23 (−31)	−33 (−36)
Average precipitation inches (mm)	6.22 (158)	5.95 (151)	4.69 (119)	4.48 (114)	5.41 (137)	4.58 (116)	5.70 (145)	9.93 (252)	13.21 (336)	10.88 (276)	7.16 (182)	7.97 (202)	86.18 (2,188)
Average snowfall inches (cm)	20.6 (52)	18.7 (47)	20.0 (51)	4.9 (12)	0.8 (2.0)	0.0 (0.0)	0.0 (0.0)	0.0 (0.0)	0.0 (0.0)	1.1 (2.8)	9.9 (25)	24.5 (62)	100.5 (253.8)
Average precipitation days (≥ 0.01 in)	17.3	15.6	15.4	16.5	17.2	17.2	19.2	19.7	21.1	20.8	17.9	19.7	217.6
Average snowy days (≥ 0.1 in)	8.1	7.1	7.9	3.0	0.1	0.0	0.0	0.0	0.0	1.0	5.6	8.7	41.5
Source 1: NWS
Source 2: NOAA (average snowfall/snow days 1981–2010)

== Economy ==
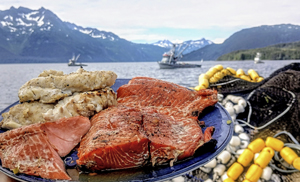
Cordova Alaska salmon seine commercial fishing boats

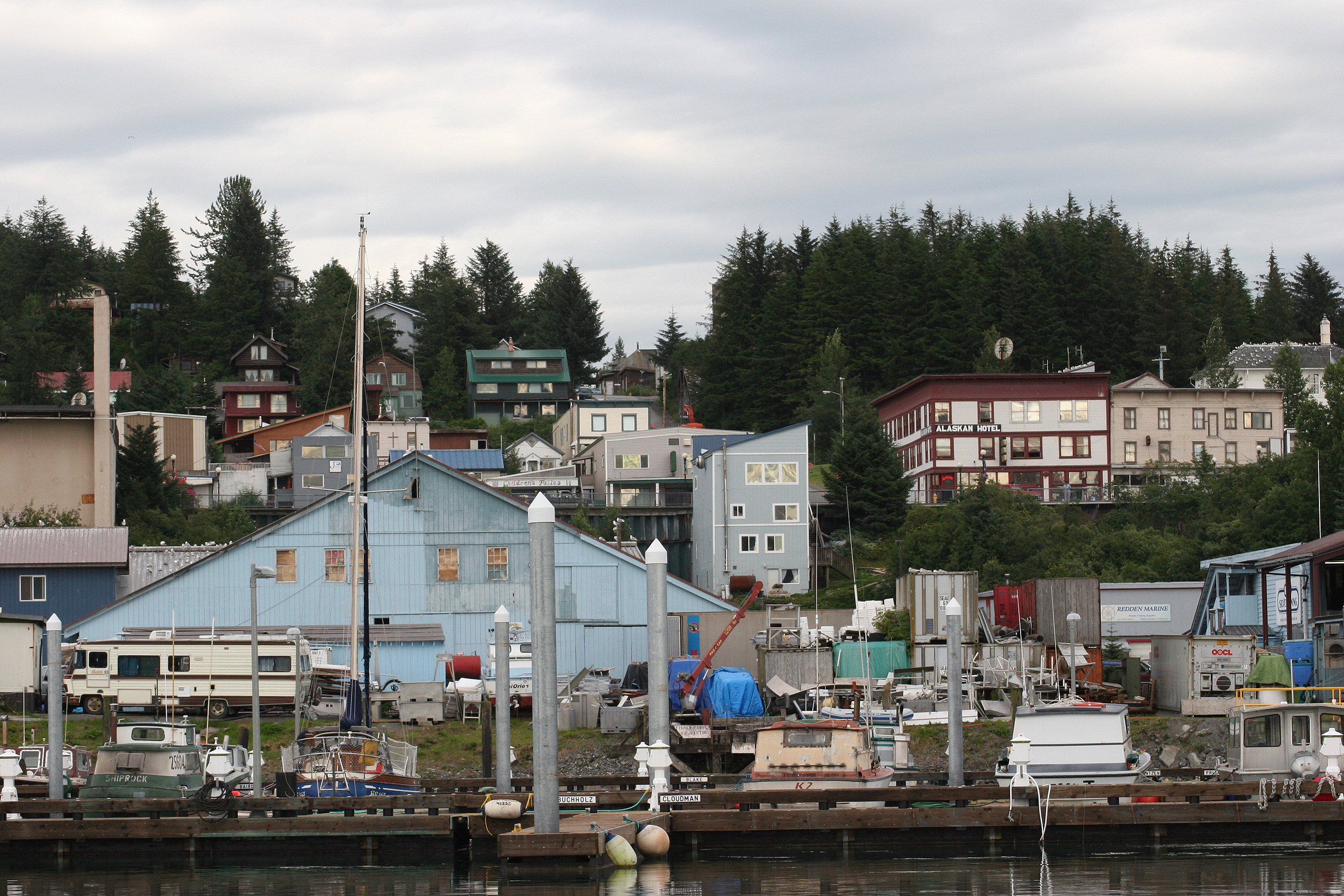
A view of the Cordova hillside from the boat harbor

Commercial fishing is the main industry in Cordova. Half of all households in Cordova have at least one person involved in commercial fishing or processing. The fishing fleet mainly fishes the Prince William Sound and Copper River Delta area. There are various fisheries in the area, the most economically important of which is the salmon fishery.

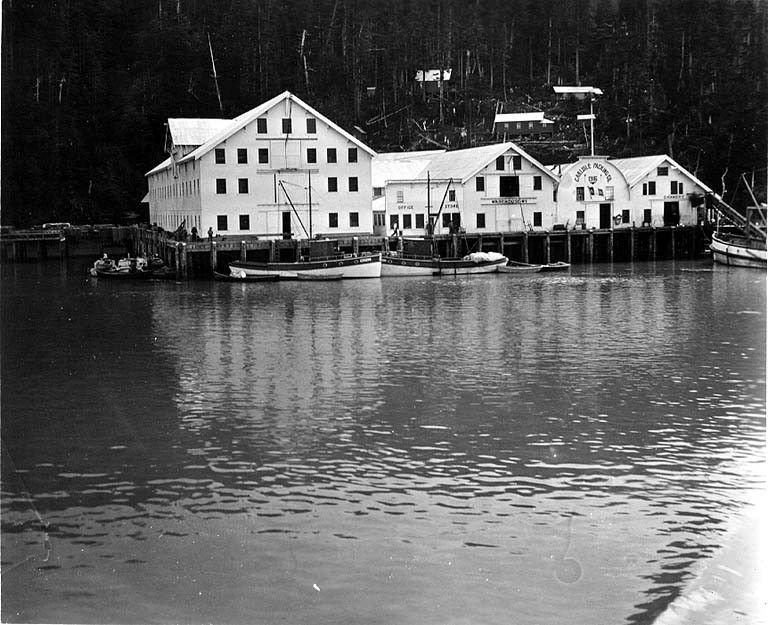
Carlisle Packing Co. cannery in Cordova, August 1917

All Pacific salmon species except for the cherry salmon are caught. Fishermen use either a purse seine, drift gillnet, or set gillnet to catch the fish. All fisheries are regulated by the Alaska Department of Fish and Game. The fisheries in Alaska have a limited entry permit system. The first fish processing plant near Cordova opened in 1887. In 2009 there were 159 purse seine, 511 drift gillnet, and 27 set gillnet permits fished in the Prince William Sound and Copper River Delta area.

== Arts and culture ==
Various festivals and celebrations take place throughout the year. The Copper River Delta Shorebird Festival, hosted by the Cordova Chamber of Commerce, takes place each year in early May. Millions of migrating shorebirds stop in the area to rest and feed before finishing their journey north. The most numerous species are the western sandpiper, least sandpiper, and dunlin. This is a popular time for avid and casual bird watchers to visit. Activities, workshops, and bird watching tours are held throughout the week.

The Cordova Iceworm Festival takes place each February. Activities include a parade, talent show, royal crowning ceremony, and various competitions such as an oyster shucking contest, ping pong tournament, and a survival suit race.

Copper River Wild Salmon Festival takes place in July at the Mt. Eyak ski area and includes various events. Salmon Jam Music Festival serves as one of the main events and a fund raiser for Cordova Arts, where local musicians perform followed by professional acts and takes place over the course of Friday and Saturday nights. Taste of Cordova, a wild food and Copper River salmon cook off, usually starts the events. Entries are made with a variety of wild, locally harvested foods and are judged by a panel of guest chefs and food writers. The Alaska Salmon Runs start Saturday morning and include a marathon, half marathon, 10k, 5k, and a 1-mile race on the Copper River Highway. Small Fry activities are educational events for children and families that take place during the races.

The Cordova Historical Museum has exhibits on the Copper River and Northwestern Railway, the local fishing industry, and Alaska Natives. They also host a juried art show called "Fish Follies".

The Ilanka Cultural Center museum features exhibits on Eyak, Alutiiq, Ahtna and Tlingit history and contemporary life – including artifacts, photographs, and oral histories. The 24-1/2-foot orca whale, Eyak, is one of only five fully rearticulated orca whale skeletons in the world.

The Cordova Ikumat Alutiiq group was formed in 1995, composed of youth and adults, and is open to anyone who wants to join; the group performs songs from the past as well as original pieces. The Ilanka Cultural Center offers traditional arts and skills still practiced including skin sewing, beadwork; mask, totem, and ivory carving; "putting up" fish and deer; berry-picking and jam-making; and subsistence and commercial fishing.

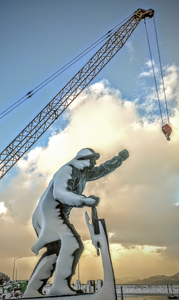
Southeasterly sculpture Joan Bugbee Jackson Cordova Alaska harbor

=== Cordova Center ===
In late 2010, clearing the site and construction of a 33,929-square-foot (3,152.1 m^{2}) community center, to be named the Cordova Center, began. The Cordova Center hosts a new library, museum, auditorium, conference and meeting space, plus city hall offices. It finally opened in the winter of 2015 for the residents of Cordova. Various events take place in the walls of this building such as community movie nights in the theater, winter bazaars, art shows, and many more.

== Sports and recreation ==
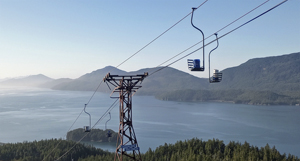
Mount Eyak ski lift Cordova Alaska

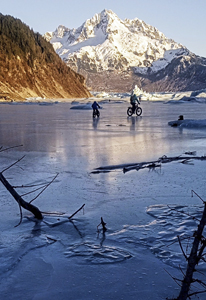
Sheridan glacier Cordova Alaska

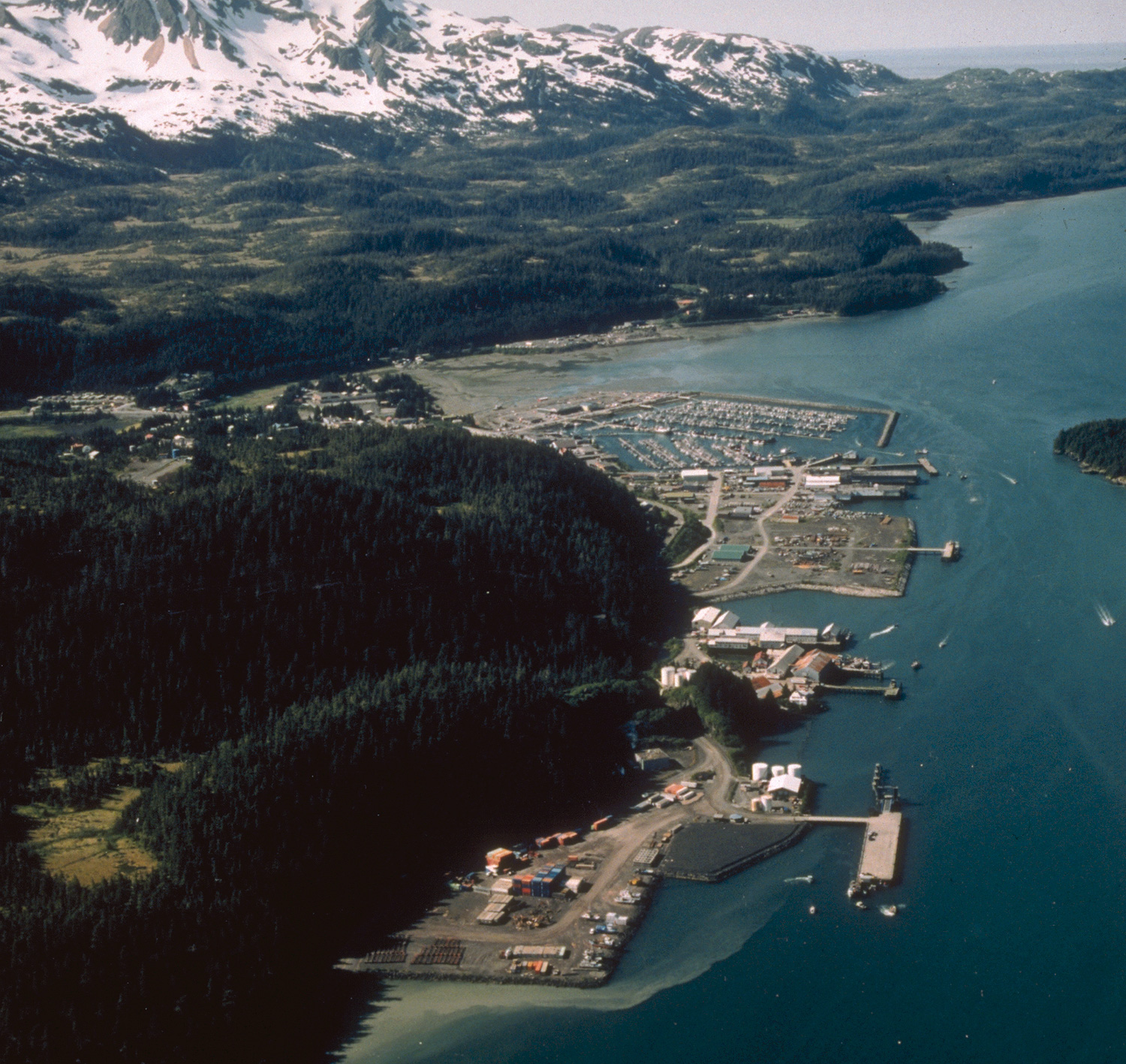
Southerly aerial view of Cordova, including the harbor area and Orca Inlet.

Skiing is a popular activity in the winter. The surrounding Chugach Mountains provide excellent back country ski slopes. The Mt. Eyak ski area operates a single chair ski lift and rope tow. It is the oldest working ski lift in North America. Snowshoeing and ice skating are very popular sports around the Cordova area when conditions are right.

Hiking is available year-round on many trails. Some are within walking distance of the city while many others are a leisurely drive away."Easy Trails" include:

- Eyak River at Copper River Highway mile 5.7
- Alaganik Slough Trail via Copper River Highway to mile 16.9; turn south on Alaganik Slough Road then follow the main road for 2.9 miles. The trail begins on the east side of the road.
- Pipeline Lakes Trail at Copper River Highway mile 21.4
- McKinley Lake Trail at Copper River Highway mile 21.6
- Saddlebag Glacier Trail via Copper River Highway to mile 24.6; turn north on firewood cutting road; trail begins one mile away at the end of the road.
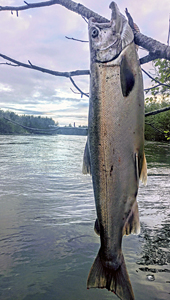
  Cordova Alaska coho salmon fishing

In the summer kayaking in Prince William Sound is popular. The Sound has more tidewater glaciers than any other region in North America. 1,900,000 acres (7,700 km^{2}) of the western Sound are designated as the Nellie Juan College Fjord Wilderness Study Area.

Indoor recreation includes the Bob Korn Memorial Pool, and the Bidarki Fitness Center, which has a gym with basketball court upstairs, a weight room, and multiple spaces with cardio training equipment

The Meals Reservoir Disc Golf Course is a public disc golf course erected in the summer of 2018, located near Meals Reservoir off Whitshed Rd.

== Government ==
The City of Cordova has a Council-Manager type government. The City Council is the legislative body and has seven seats and is presided over by the mayor (not among those seven members). The mayor is the ceremonial head of city government and has the power to veto ordinances. The city council appoints the city manager for an indefinite term (and may be removed at any time by the council). The city manager, the head of the administrative branch of the city government, executes all ordinances and laws, and administers the government of the city.

The city levies a property tax as well as a 7 percent sales tax, although there are other taxes as well such as lodging.

== Education ==
The Cordova School District operates the schools in the community. Mt. Eccles elementary school is the only public primary education facility in Cordova and had an enrollment of 206 students in 2008. Public secondary education is served by a single combined junior and senior high school. The high school had an enrollment of 205 students in 2008. The Cordova School District has 26 employed teachers. Post-secondary education is provided by the Prince William Sound College, a community campus of University of Alaska Anchorage.

== Media ==
The independently owned city newspaper, The Cordova Times, established in 1914 is published weekly and distributed every Friday.

There are three radio stations in the area. KLAM (1450 AM) began broadcasting in 1954 and generally plays classic rock, country, and news and talk shows. KCDV (100.9 FM) started in 1997 and plays top hits, '80s, and '90s music. Both stations are owned by Bayview Communications Inc. KCHU, based in Valdez operates a translator at 88.1 FM that serves Cordova public radio programming.

The Cordova area is often featured in ski films by director Warren Miller.

== Transportation ==
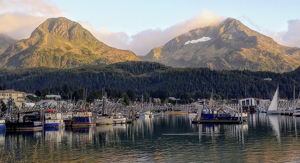
Cordova Alaska small boat harbor

Despite being on the mainland, Cordova is only accessible via boat or aircraft, as there is no road connecting the city to any other. It was previously accessible by railroad however the railway is no longer in use largely due to the 1964 Good Friday earthquake and the resulting destruction it caused to the Million Dollar Bridge. The longest road is the Copper River Highway which follows the old railbed of the Copper River and Northwestern Railway for 49.5 miles (79.7 km). The first 11 miles (18 km) east of Cordova is paved and the rest is gravel. As of the summer of 2011, vehicle traffic can only reach the 36 mile mark as changes in the river course washed out the 339 bridge. The following 13.5 miles (21.7 km) may still be accessed via a river crossing by boat. Cars and trucks can be transported to Cordova by ferry. Regular ferry service is provided by the state owned Alaska Marine Highway System to Valdez and Whittier with whistle stops (the ferry only stops if there are prior reservations) in Tatitlek and Chenega Bay. The M/V Aurora operates in Prince William Sound year round.

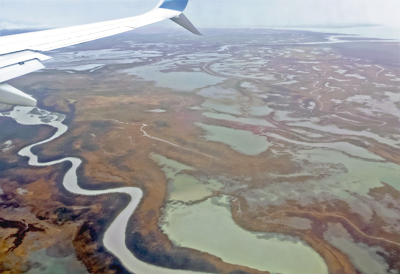
Alaska Air Copper river delta Cordova 2

Cordova has two airports. Merle K. (Mudhole) Smith Airport is a state-owned airport located 11 miles (18 km) east of the city. It has regular jet service provided by Alaska Airlines. Its main runway is 7,500 feet (2,300 m) long with an asphalt surface. The Cordova Municipal Airport is 1 mile (1.6 km) from the city and is also state owned. It is located on Lake Eyak which also has a seaplane landing area. The sole runway has a length of 1,800 feet (550 m) with a gravel surface. The municipal airport is mostly used by air taxis and personal aircraft.

== Notable people ==
- Marie Smith Jones (1918–2008), last native speaker of the Eyak language and last full blood Eyak
- Cody McKenzie (born 1987), UFC fighter

== See also ==
- Miles Glacier Bridge
- Mount Eyak
